= Bodenheimer =

Bodenheimer is a surname. Notable people with the surname include:

- Alfred Bodenheimer (born 1965), Swiss literary scholar and author
- Arie (Bode) Bodaheimer (1944–2017), Israeli writer and educator, director
- Aron Ronald Bodenheimer (1923–2011), Swiss physician, psychiatrist, psychoanalyst and author of provocative essays and books
- Edgar Bodenheimer (1908–1991), US law professor and author
- Friedrich Simon Bodenheimer (1897–1959), German-born Israeli entomologist
- George Bodenheimer (born 1958), President of ESPN Inc.
- Löb Bodenheimer (1807–1868), German rabbi
- Levi Bodenheimer, (1807–1867), German consistorial rabbi and author
- Max Bodenheimer (1865–1940), lawyer and one of the main figures in German Zionism
- Ronald Bodenheimer (born 1953), American lawyer
- Shimon Fritz Bodenheimer (1897–1959), Israeli biologist and zoologist
- Siegmund Bodenheimer (1874–1966), German-Jewish banker
- Wolf Bodenheimer (1905–1975),
- Yosef Bodenheimer (1941–2024), Israeli physicist

== See also ==
- Bodenheim (disambiguation)
