= Kydliny =

Coordinates: 49°23′17″N 13°21′24″E

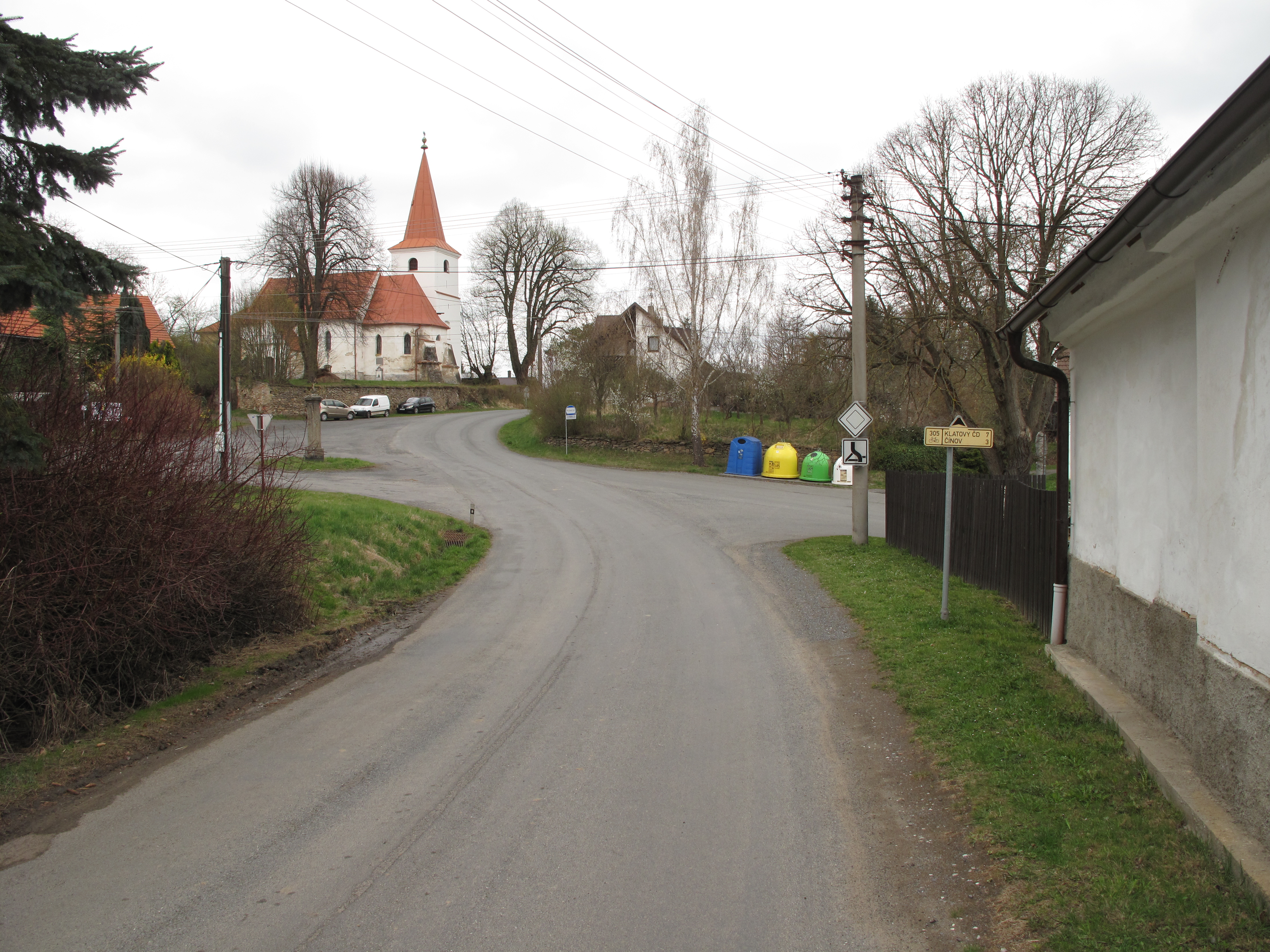
- The church of Saint Wenceslas behind the crossroads
- Interactive map of Kydliny

Kydliny is a village located about 4.5 kilometers to the west of Klatovy in the Czech Republic. It was first mentioned in 1352, and its Church of Saint Wenceslas, a cultural monument of the Czech Republic, dates back to that year. In 2011 there were 85 inhabitants and 59 houses dedicated for living.

== Gallery ==
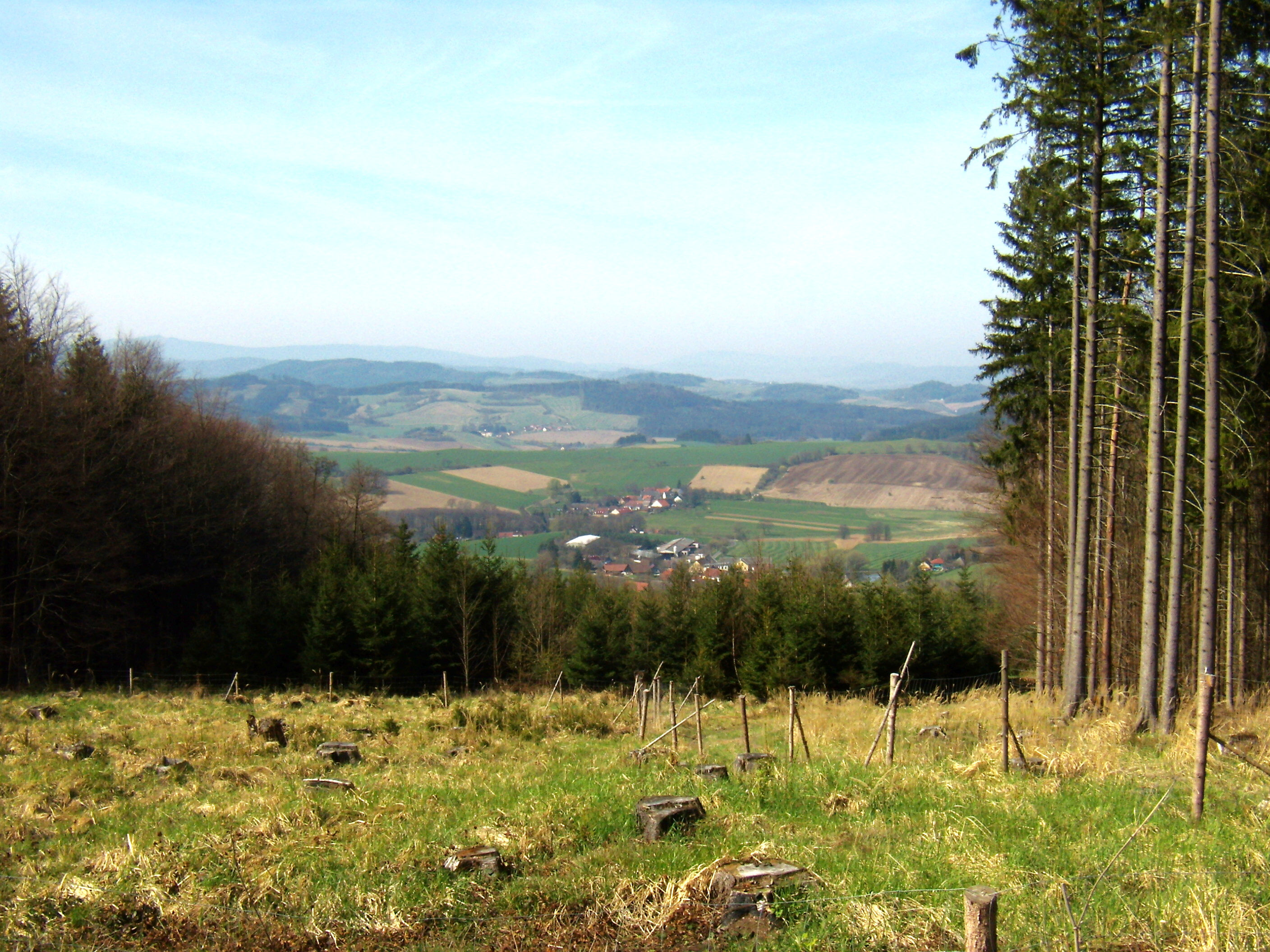
Kydliny as seen from the hill

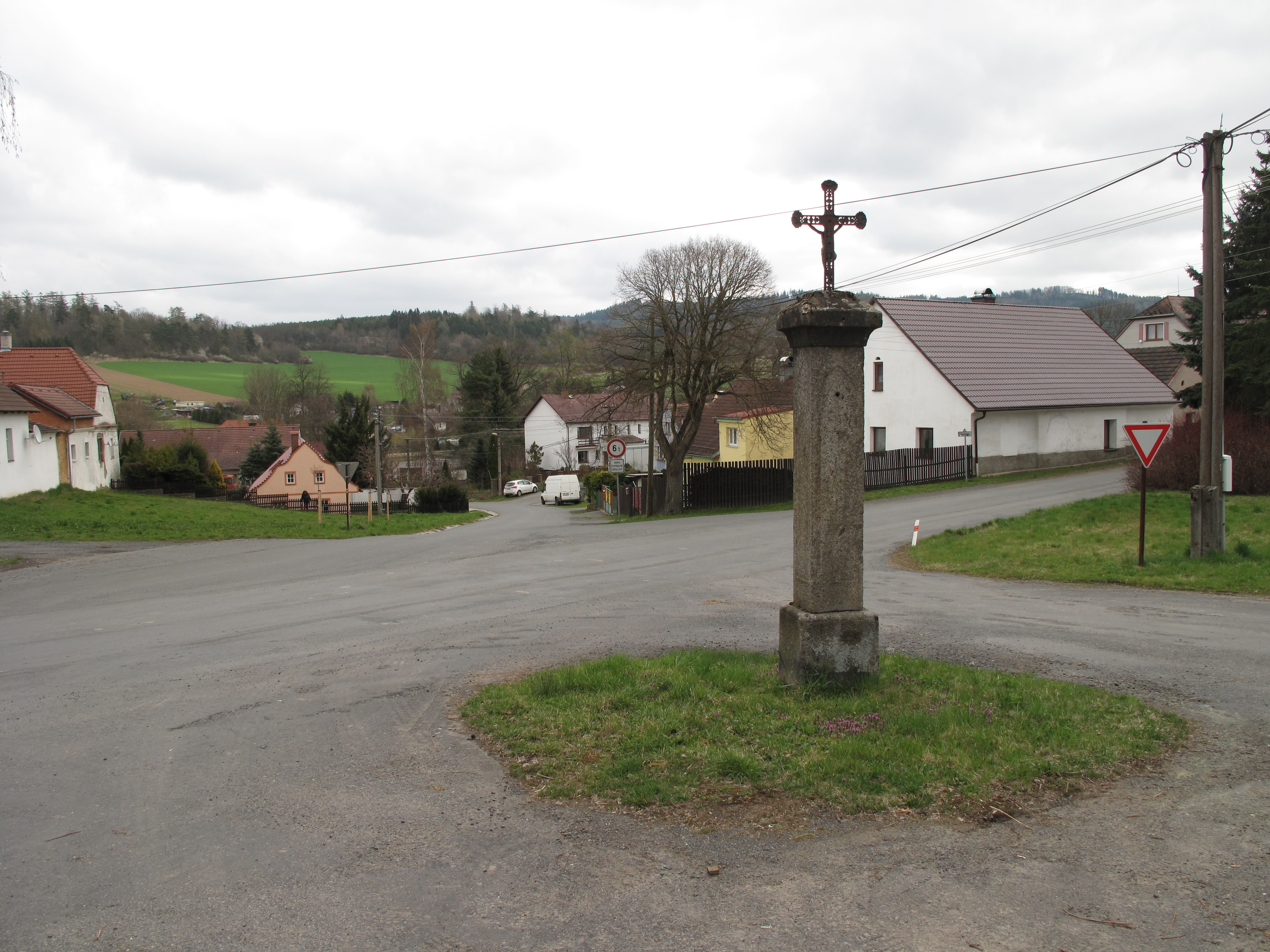
Crossroads with a wayside shrine

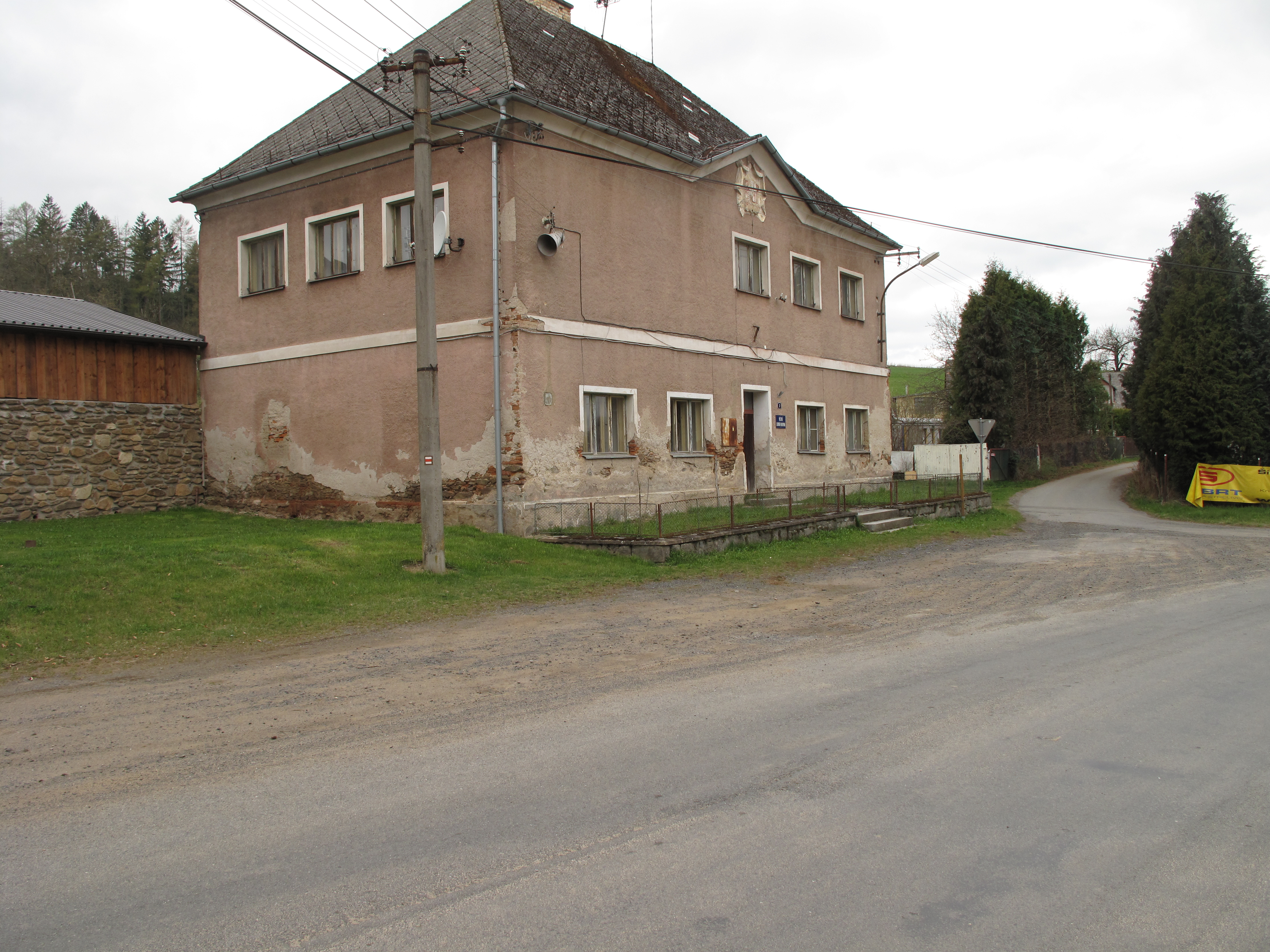
Library (as in 2022)

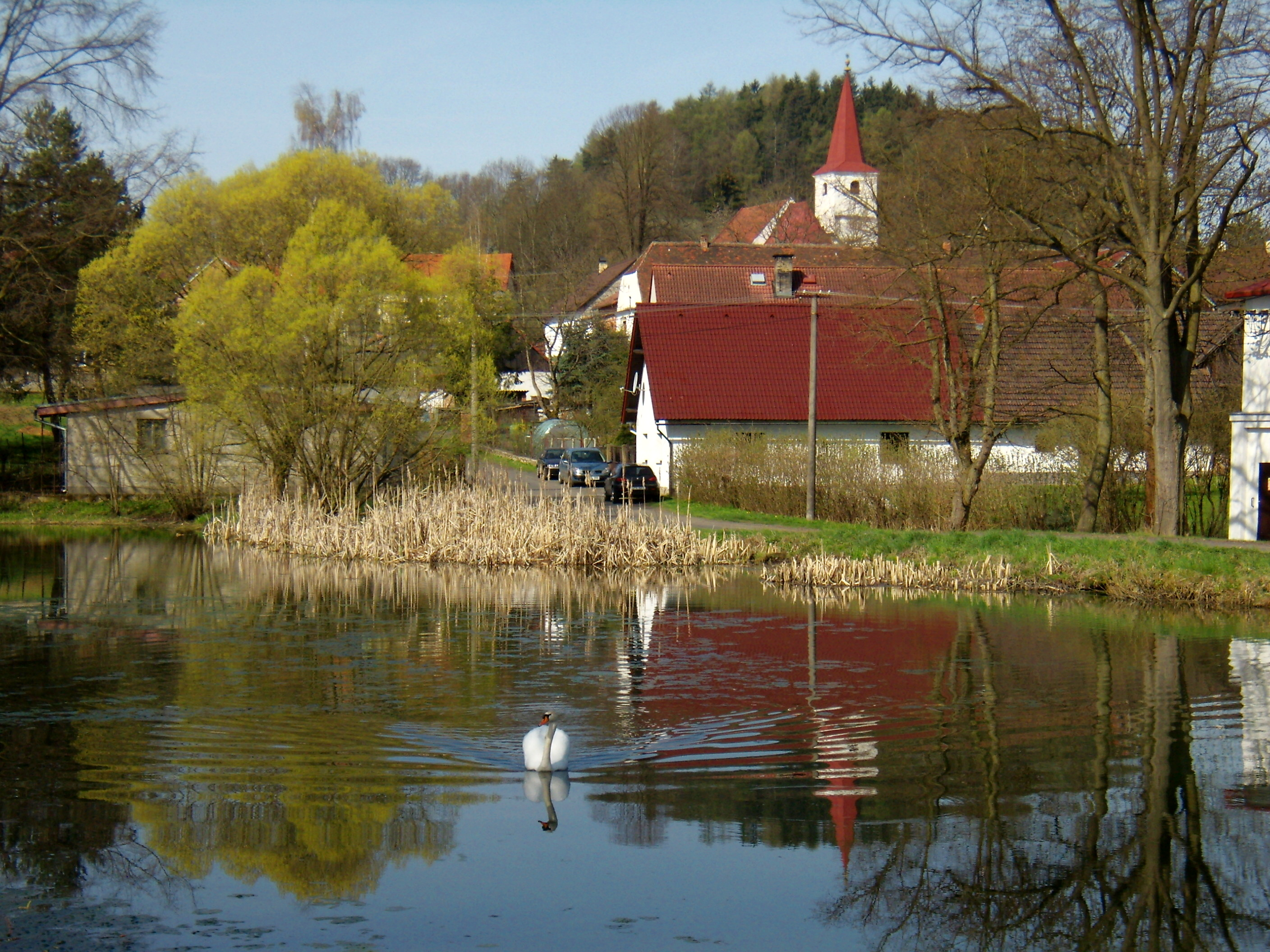
Pond with a swan
