= Chudenín =

- Municipality
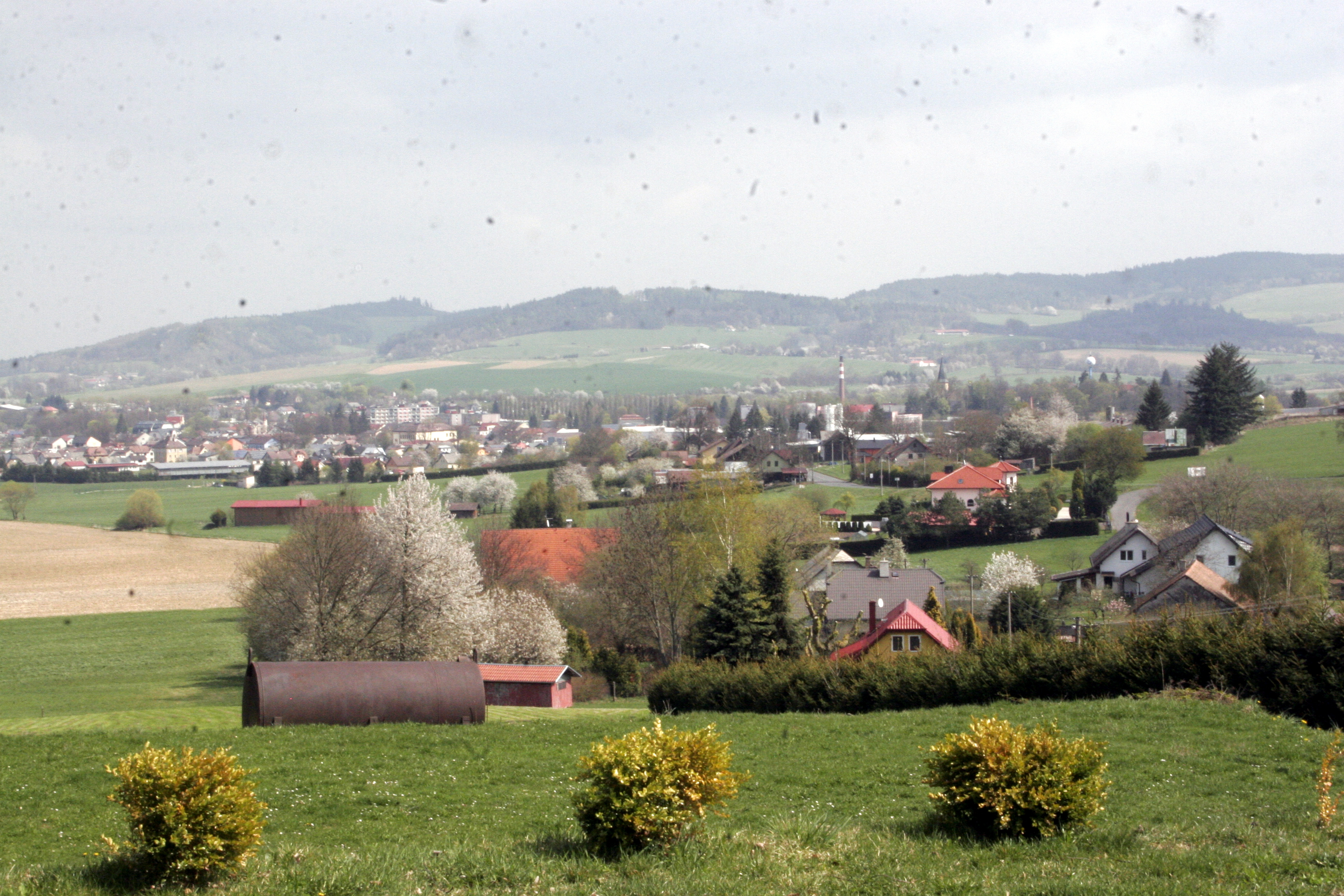
- Skelná Huť, a part of Chudenín

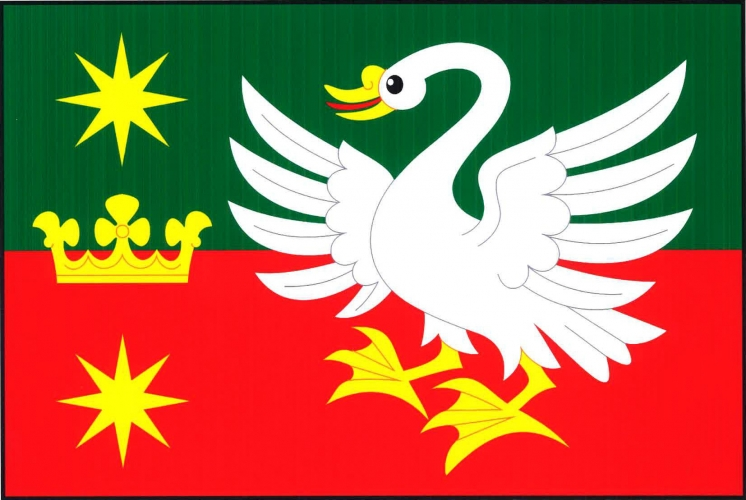
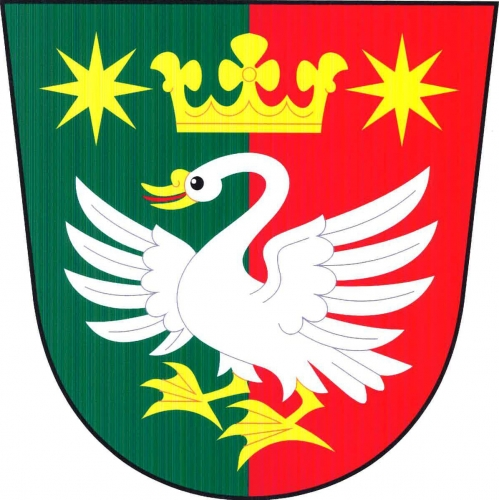
- Flag Coat of arms

- Location in the Czech Republic
- Coordinates: 49°17′35″N 13°6′3″E
- Country: Czech Republic
- Region: Plzeň
- District: Klatovy
- First mentioned: 1578

Area
  - Total: 45.85 km^{2} (17.70 sq mi)
- Elevation: 478 m (1,568 ft)

Population (2026-01-01)
  - Total: 660
  - Density: 14/km^{2} (37/sq mi)
- Time zone: UTC+1 (CET)
  - Summer (DST): UTC+2 (CEST)
- Postal code: 340 22
- Website: www.chudenin.cz

Chudenín (German: Chudiwa) is a municipality and village in Klatovy District in the Plzeň Region of the Czech Republic. It has about 700 inhabitants.

Chudenín lies approximately 18 kilometres (11 mi) south-west of Klatovy, 54 km (34 mi) south of Plzeň, and 130 km (81 mi) south-west of Prague.

== Administrative division ==
Chudenín consists of eight municipal parts (in brackets population according to the 2021 census):

- Chudenín (231)
- Fleky (25)
- Hadrava (76)
- Liščí (11)
- Skelná Huť (173)
- Suchý Kámen (3)
- Svatá Kateřina (19)
- Uhliště (55)

== Demographics ==
Historical population
Year	Pop.	±%
1869	2,790	—
1880	2,792	+0.1%
1890	2,709	−3.0%
1900	2,689	−0.7%
1910	2,789	+3.7%
1921	2,937	+5.3%
1930	2,783	−5.2%
1950	712	−74.4%
1961	804	+12.9%
1970	760	−5.5%
1980	640	−15.8%
1991	598	−6.6%
2001	612	+2.3%
2011	588	−3.9%
2021	593	+0.9%
Source: Censuses
