= Aron Freimann =

German librarian and historian

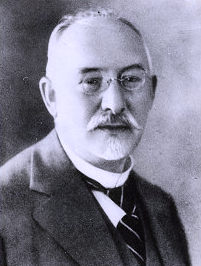
Aron Freimann

Aron Freimann (5 August 1871 at Filehne, Posen – 6 June 1948 at New York City) was a German librarian and historian. He was the son of Israel Meïr Freimann, and grandson, on his mother's side, of the chief rabbi of Altona, Jacob Ettlinger. He attended the Royal Gymnasium of Ostrowo (his father was the town's Jewish congregation rabbi) and in 1893 entered the University of Berlin (Ph. D., 1896), where he studied history and Oriental languages, devoting himself at the same time to the study of archival and library systems. Parallelly he took courses at the Rabbinical Seminary at Berlin.

From 1897 he was chief of the Hebrew department at the Stadtbibliotek Frankfurt, and under his direction the library in Frankfurt upon Main assembled one of the richest collections of Judaica and Hebraica in the world. He was forced to retire in 1933 when the Nazis came to power and immigrated to the United States in 1938. Between 1939 and 1945 he served as consultant in bibliography to the New York Public Library.

Since 1900 he was one of the editors of Zeitschrift für hebräische Bibliographie. He was the author of Die Isagoge des Porphyrius in den Syrischen Uebersetzungen (1896), and Geschichte der Israelitischen Gemeinde Ostrowo (1896). To the "Ḳobeẓ al-Yad," a collective work published by the Mekize Nirdamim Society, he contributed articles on the history of the Jews in Prague.
