= Waldenburg =

Waldenburg may refer to:

== Geography ==
- Waldenburg, Baden-Württemberg, Germany
- Waldenburg, Saxony, Germany
- Waldenburg, Silesia, today Wałbrzych, Poland
- Waldenburg, Switzerland
- Waldenburg, Arkansas, USA
- Bělá pod Pradědem (Waldenburg), Czech Republic
- Waldenburg Mountains, a mountain range in Poland

== People ==
- Louis Waldenburg

== See also ==
- Waldburg
- Wald (disambiguation)
- Waldenberg
