= Myslovice =

- Municipality
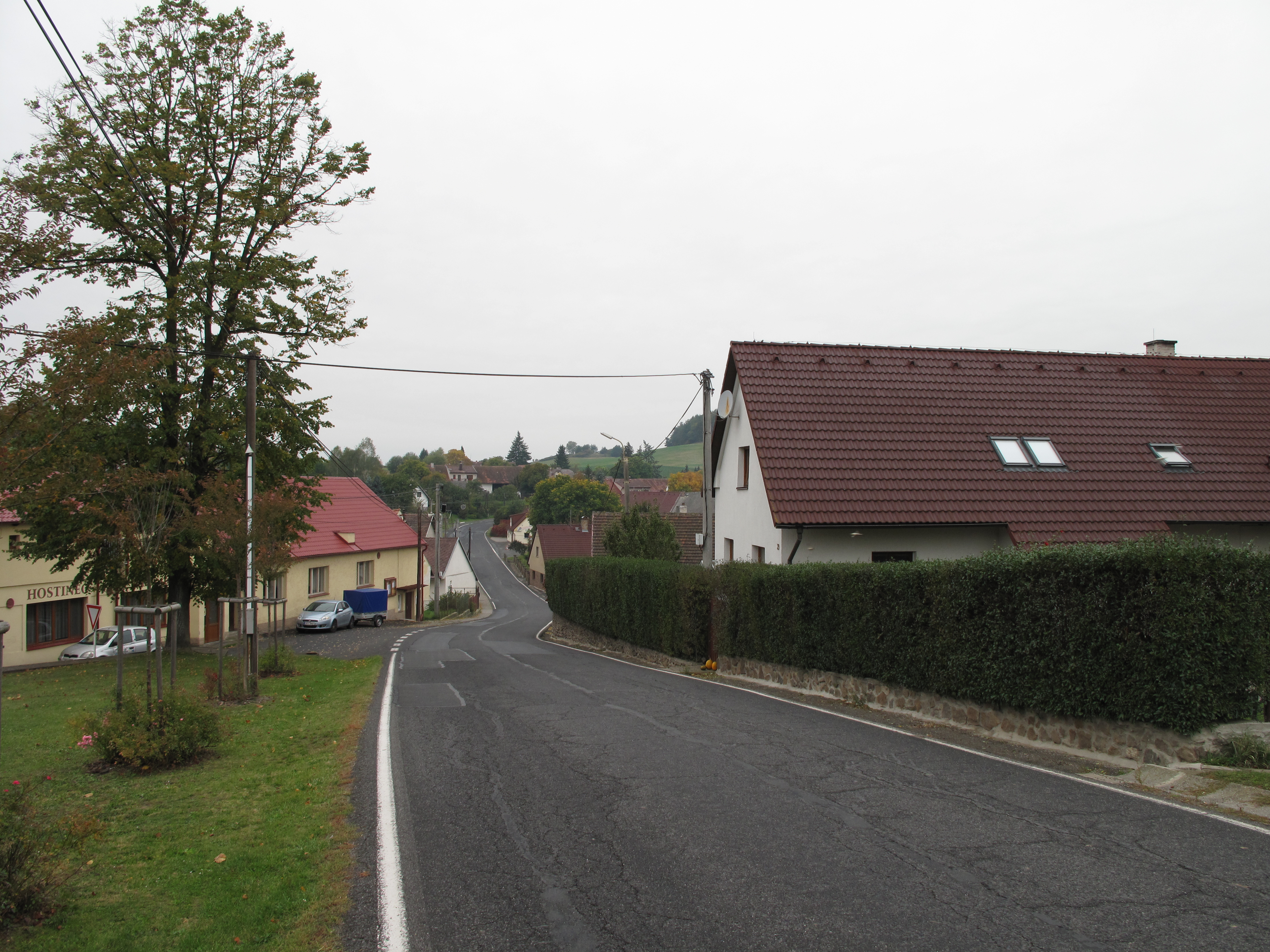
- Main street

- Location in the Czech Republic
- Coordinates: 49°24′25″N 13°23′13″E
- Country: Czech Republic
- Region: Plzeň
- District: Klatovy
- First mentioned: 1379

Area
  - Total: 4.06 km^{2} (1.57 sq mi)
- Elevation: 450 m (1,480 ft)

Population (2026-01-01)
  - Total: 128
  - Density: 31.5/km^{2} (81.7/sq mi)
- Time zone: UTC+1 (CET)
  - Summer (DST): UTC+2 (CEST)
- Postal code: 339 01
- Website: www.myslovice.cz

Myslovice is a municipality and village in Klatovy District in the Plzeň Region of the Czech Republic. It has about 100 inhabitants.

Myslovice lies approximately 8 kilometres (5 mi) east of Klatovy, 39 km (24 mi) south of Plzeň, and 107 km (66 mi) south-west of Prague.

== Demographics ==
Historical population
Year	Pop.	±%
1869	373	—
1880	330	−11.5%
1890	285	−13.6%
1900	302	+6.0%
1910	306	+1.3%
1921	304	−0.7%
1930	281	−7.6%
1950	206	−26.7%
1961	212	+2.9%
1970	171	−19.3%
1980	154	−9.9%
1991	134	−13.0%
2001	107	−20.1%
2011	119	+11.2%
2021	122	+2.5%
Source: Censuses
