= Gustav Karpeles =

Austrian critic and historian (1848–1909)

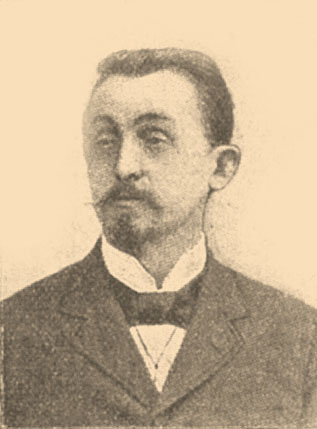
Gustav Karpeles

Gustav Karpeles (11 November 1848 in Ivanovice na Hané, Margraviate of Moravia – 21 July 1909 in Nauheim) was a German Jewish historian of literature and editor; son of Elijah Karpeles.

== Life ==
He studied at the University of Breslau, where he attended also the Jewish Theological Seminary. He embraced journalism, and was successively attached to the editorial staffs of Auf der Höhe, the Breslauer Nachrichten, the Breslauer Zeitung, the Deutsche Union, and Westermann's Deutsche Monatshefte. In 1870 he became coeditor with Samuel Enoch of the Jüdische Presse. In 1883 Karpeles settled in Berlin, where in 1890 he became editor of the Allgemeine Zeitung des Judenthums.

== Works ==
Karpeles stimulated into active life the Jewish literary societies in Germany, but made himself most widely known through his writings on Heinrich Heine. In addition to several editions of Heine's works (1885, 1887, 1888, 1902) he published the following monographs:

- "Heinrich Heine und das Judenthum" (Breslau, 1868)
- "Heinrich Heine, Biographische Skizzen" (Berlin, 1869)
- "Heinrich Heine und Seine Zeitgenossen" (ib. 1887)
- "Heinrich Heine und der Rabbi von Bacharach" (Vienna, 1895)
- "Heinrich Heine's Autobiographie" (ib. 1898)
- "Heinrich Heine: aus Seinem Leben und aus Seiner Zeit" (Leipsic, 1899).

The following are among his general writings:

- "Ludwig Börne" (Leipsic, 1870)
- "Goethe in Polen" (ib. 1890)
- "Allgemeine Gesch. der Weltliteratur" (ib. 1891)
- "Literarisches Wanderbuch" (Berlin, 1898).

He also edited the works of Schiller (Leipsic, 1895), Lenau (ib. 1896), and Eichendorff (ib. 1896).

His contributions to Jewish literature include:

- "Die Frauen in der Jüdischen Literatur" (Berlin, 1870; 2d ed., ib. n. d.)
- "Geschichte der Jüdischen Literatur" (ib. 1886)
- "Die Zionsharfe" (ib. 1889)
- "Ein Blick in die Jüdische Literatur" (Prague, 1895)
- "Jewish Literature and Other Essays" (Philadelphia, 1895)-- Available at Gutenberg.org
- "A Sketch of Jewish History" (ib. 1897).
- "Jews and Judaism in the Nineteenth Century. Translated from the German" (Philadelphia, The Jewish Publication Society of America, 1905).

Karpeles also wrote drama:

- "Deutsches Leben" and "Deutsche Liebe," comedies (1873)
- "Im Foyer" (1876)
- A dramatization of Grabbe's "Don Juan und Faust" (1877).
