= Bedřich Antonín Wiedermann =

Czech music educator, composer, organist and organ builder

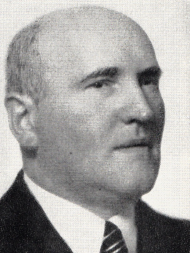
Bedřich Antonín Wiedermann

Bedřich Antonín Wiedermann (10 November 1883 – 5 November 1951) was a Czech organist, composer, teacher and organ builder.

== Life ==
Bedřich Antonín Wiedermann was born on 10 November 1883 in Ivanovice na Hané, Moravia, Austria-Hungary. He graduated from the classical lyceum in Prague, where his teacher for elective singing was the organist Josef Klička (who also taught at the Prague Conservatory). He worked briefly as a finance clerk in Kroměříž before deciding to study theology at Olomouc. During his studies in Olomouc, he was the organist and choirmaster at the St. Wenceslas cathedral. After seven semesters of study, shortly before he would have graduated, he abandoned theology and enrolled in the Prague Conservatory, where he would study from 1908 to 1910, organ with Josef Klička and composition with Vítězslav Novák. Between 1910 and 1919 he worked as a church organist, first at the cathedral in Brno, then in Prague at the Emmaus Church and at the Church of Cyril and Methodius in Karlín. At the same time, he played the viola in the Czech Philharmonic for three years. In the meantime, he also joined the faculty of the Prague Conservatory, where he would teach from 1917 to 1944 and again briefly after the war. When the Academy for Performing Arts was founded in Prague in 1946, he began teaching there, too. He died in Prague on 5 November 1951, at the age of 67.

His notable pupils were Jiří Ropek, Bedřich Janáček, and Josef Černocký. Wiedermann gained great reputation as an organist, he performed in England (1924), New York City (1924), Germany (1925), Sweden (1926), and Belgium (1935).

== Selected works ==
His compositional output comprises 350 opus numbers of varied instrumentation and vocal formations.

Organ

- Tři skladby pro varhany (Three Pieces for Organ) (1912)
- Elegie (Elegy) (1920)
- Tři chorálové předehry (Three Choral Preludes) (1919–1927)
- Míťova ukolébavka (Míťa's Lullaby) (1935)
- Ukolébavka (Lullaby) (1939)
- Pod čs. vlajkou a rudým praporem (Under the Czechoslovak Flag and Under the Red Flag) (1946)
- Pastorale dorico (1942)
- Notturno in C sharp minor (1942)
- Pastorale lydico (1945)

Violin

- Suita ve starém slohu (Suite in Old Style) - for violin and piano (1920) (orchestrated in 1939)

Songs

- Tři písně v lidovém tónu moravském (Three Songs on Themes of Moravian Folk Songs) (1913)
- Hanácke kolede (Hanakian Carols) (1936)
- Hanácky pěsničke (Hanakian Songs) (1948)

Choirs

- Dva mužské sbory (Two Male Choirs) (1935)
- Na křídech vánku (On the Wings of Breeze) (1945)

Cantatas

- Havéřská kantáta (Miner's Cantata) (1939)
- Kantáta ve starém slohu (Cantata in Old Style) (1941)

Sacred music

- Miserere ad septem voces inaequales (1907–1911)
- Missa solemnis, Missa in quadragesima (1948)
