= Kropacz coat of arms =

Polish coat of arms

Kropacz
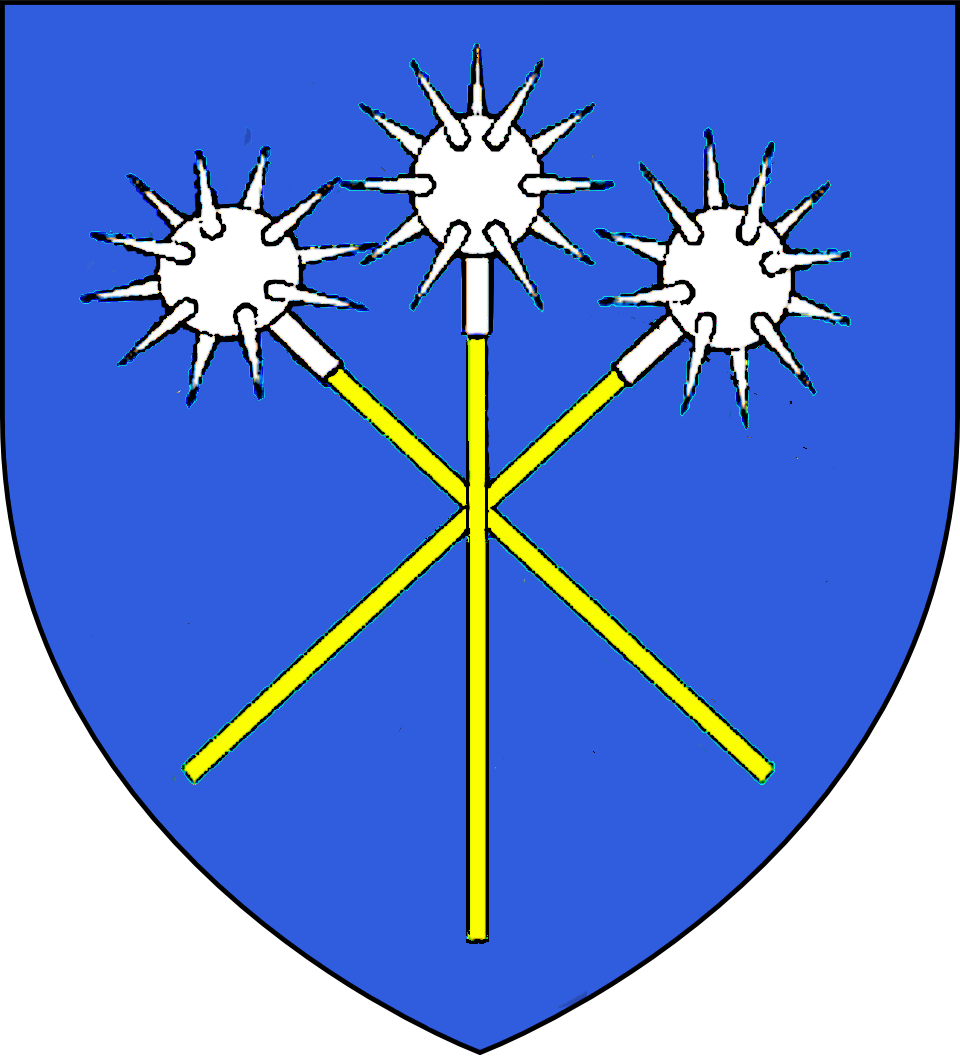
- Alternative names: Kropáč, Niewiadomski II
- Earliest mention: 1473
- Towns: Niewiadom
- Families: Kropacz, Kropáč, Niewiadomski, Nevědomský

Kropacz (Kropáč or Niewiadomski II) is a Polish coat of arms and Czech coat of arms. It was used by several knight and szlachta (cs šlechtice) families in the times of the Kingdom of Poland, Kingdom of Bohemia and Duchies of Silesia.

== History ==
6 June 1473 Wacław of Niewiadom was promoted to the lord of the Rybnik.

== Blazon ==
In a field of blue morningstar on two morningstars.

== Notable bearers ==
Notable bearers of this coat of arms include:

- Václav Kropáč z Nevědomí - owner of Rybnik (1473–1494),
- Jan Kropáč z Nevědomí and his son Mikuláš Kropáč z Nevědomí - owner of Bučovice (1494–1512)
- Jindřich Kropáč z Nevědomí - owner of Ivanovice na Hané (1503–1513),
- Albert Kropáč z Nevědomí - owner of Ivanovice na Hané (1513–1527),
- Bohuš Kropáč z Nevědomí - owner of Ivanovice na Hané (1527–1539),
- Jan Kropáč z Nevědomí - owner of Hranice (Přerov District) (1533–1572).

== See also ==
- Polish heraldry
- Heraldry
- Coat of arms
- List of Polish nobility coats of arms

== Sources ==
- Jiří J. K. Nebeský, Kropáčovsko-Leskovský erbovní vývod (Hranice), Genealogické a heraldické listy 15, 1995, č. 1-2, s. 38-48
- Tadeusz Gajl Herby szlacheckie Rzeczypospolitej Obojga Narodów, Wydawnictwo L&L, Gdańsk 2003
- www.ivanovicenahane.cz
- www.uhrice-vy.cz<
