= Bodenheim (disambiguation) =

Bodenheim is a state-recognized tourism municipality (Fremdenverkehrsgemeinde) in the Mainz-Bingen district of Rhineland-Palatinate, Germany.

Bodenheim may also refer to:

- Bodenheim (Verbandsgemeinde), a collective municipality in the German district of Mainz-Bingen, encompassing the tourism municipality

People:

- Maxwell Bodenheim (1892–1954), American poet and novelist.
- Nelly Bodenheim (1874–1951), Dutch illustrator

== See also ==
- Bodenheimer, a surname
