= Samuel Enoch =

German rabbi (1814–1876)

Samuel Enoch (October 8, 1814 – December 31, 1876) was a German rabbi.

Samuel Enoch was born in Hamburg. He attended the Johanneum Gymnasium and the Talmudic lectures of Ḥakam Isaac Bernays, entered the University of Würzburg, and also became a pupil of Rabbi Abraham Bing. He obtained his Ph.D. degree at Erlangen.

He continued his Talmudic studies with Levi Bodenheimer in Hildesheim, and R. Rohmann in Kassel; and founded in Altona a Jewish secondary school (Bürgerschule), which continued under his direction until he became (1855) rabbi of Fulda, where he remained until his death.

Enoch edited for several years, beginning 1845 and with Jacob Ettlinger, an Orthodox weekly entitled Der Treue Zionswächter (German title, Hebrew supplement Shomer Ziyyon ha-Ne'enan which was Enoch's contribution). He was also associated as editor with the Berlin Jüdische Presse, which position he occupied at his death.
