= Israel Meir Freimann =

Israel Meir Freimann (Yiddish: ישראל מאיר פריַימאן, also Israel Meier Freimann; 27 September 1830 – 21 August 1884) was a Polish-born German rabbi, philosopher and orientalist.

== Biography ==
Freimann was born on 27 September 1830 in Kraków. Born as the younger son of Eliakum Freimann and Esther Breiter, Freimann received his education from his father and in various Talmudical schools (yeshivot) in Hungary. After attending a Gymnasium (grammar school) in 1850 in Leipzig, Saxony, where he stayed with his elder brother Isak (Eisik), in 1852 he moved to Breslau, then Prussia. There he attended the Catholic Royal Matthias-Gymnasium where he took his A-levels (Abitur). Between 1856 and 1860 he studied philosophy and Oriental languages at the local Silesian Frederick William University (now Wrocław University). In 1860 Landesrabbiner Gedalja Tiktin, the Silesian provincial chief rabbi, ordained Freimann as rabbi.

In the same year Freimann took up the rabbinate of the Jewish congregation in Filehne, later changing to the same position in Ostrowo, both then in the Prussian province of Posen. In 1865 he graduated (Ph. D.) at the Ducal Pan-Saxon University (Salana) (now Friedrich Schiller University) in Jena upon Saale, then Saxe-Weimar-Eisenach. He wrote his doctoral thesis, Ein Beitrag zur Geschichte der Ophiten (A contribution to the history of the Ophites), supervised by Dean Johann Gustav Stickel.

From 7 September 1871 on he worked as rabbi for the Israelitische Gemeinde Ostrowo, thus ending a vacancy since the death of his predecessor Aron Stössel (d. 31 May 1861). Freimann served his office in Ostrowo until his death. In 1875, after Rector Zacharias Frankel's death, Freimann declined to succeed him as rector of the Breslau-based Jewish Theological Seminary of Fraenckel's Foundation. From 1874 to 1884 Freimann gave Jewish religion classes in the Royal Gymnasium of Ostrowo. He died on 21 August 1884 in Ostrowo. In 1900 his fellow townspeople named a street, the "Freimannstraße", in his honour. Freimann's successor was Rabbi Dr. Elias Plessner, son of the Preacher Salomon Plessner from Berlin.

Freimann's edition of the midrashic work והזהיר (We-Hizhir; 2 parts), to which he added the valuable commentary ענפי יהודה (ʿAnpēi Yehûdāh), is indisputable evidence of his learning. The responsa (בנין ציון [Binyan Ẓiyyon]) of his father-in-law Jacob Ettlinger contain many of Freimann's essays. With his wife Helene Ettlinger (1834–1902; mar. 1860) Freimann had eight children, Josef, Nanette (mar. Simonsohn), Isak, Esther (not mar.), Regina (wife of rabbi Jakob Freimann, her cousin), Judith (mar. Pinczower), Aron and Frida (mar. Czapski).

== Works ==
- author: Ein Beitrag zur Geschichte der Ophiten, Jena: Ducal Pan-Saxon University, Diss., 1865, 142 pp.
- editor and commentarist: Khefetz ben Yatzliakh (aka Hebrew: חפץ אלוף, Khefetz Allouph), ספר והזהיר (Sēfer: Ve-hizhir): 2 vols. with Freimann's commentary ענפי יהודה (ʿAnpēi Yehûdāh)
  - Vol. 1: 'לסדר שמות' [Le-sēder Šemōt], Leipzig: Vollrath, 1873
  - Vol. 2: 'לסדר ויקרא, במדבר' [Le-sēder Vay-yiqrā, Be-midbar], Warsaw: Баумриттер, 1880
