= Wieleń =

Town in Greater Poland Voivodeship, Poland

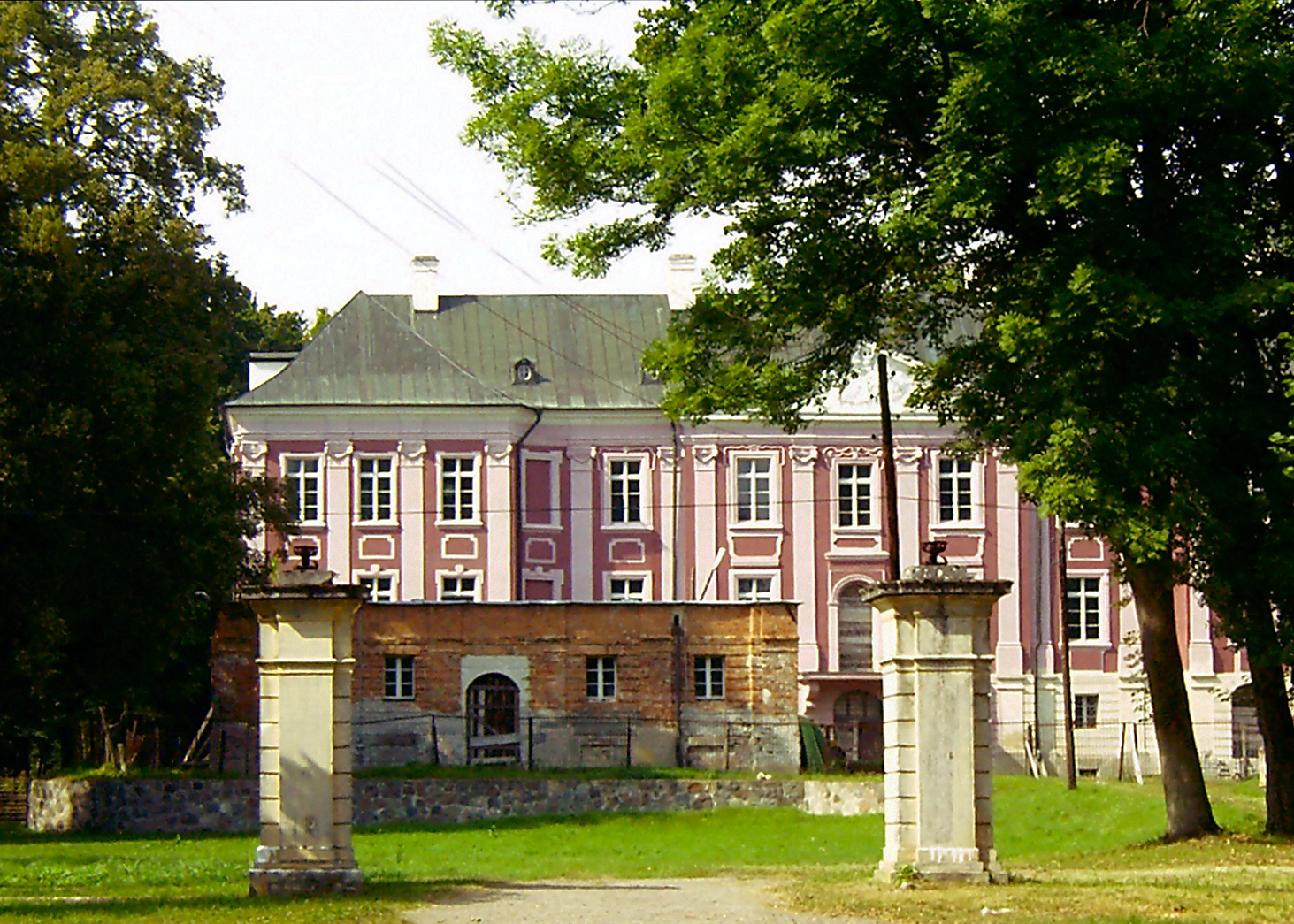
- Sapieha Palace

- Flag Coat of arms

- Location within Poland
- Coordinates: 52°53′32″N 16°10′25″E
- Country: Poland
- Voivodeship: Greater Poland
- County: Czarnków-Trzcianka
- Gmina: Wieleń

Area
  - Total: 4.32 km^{2} (1.67 sq mi)

Population (2010)
  - Total: 5,869
  - Density: 1,360/km^{2} (3,520/sq mi)
- Time zone: UTC+1 (CET)
  - Summer (DST): UTC+2 (CEST)
- Vehicle registration: PCT
- Website: http://www.wielen.pl/

Wieleń [ˈvjɛlɛɲ] is a town in Czarnków-Trzcianka County, Greater Poland Voivodeship, in western Poland. It is situated on the river Noteć.

== History ==
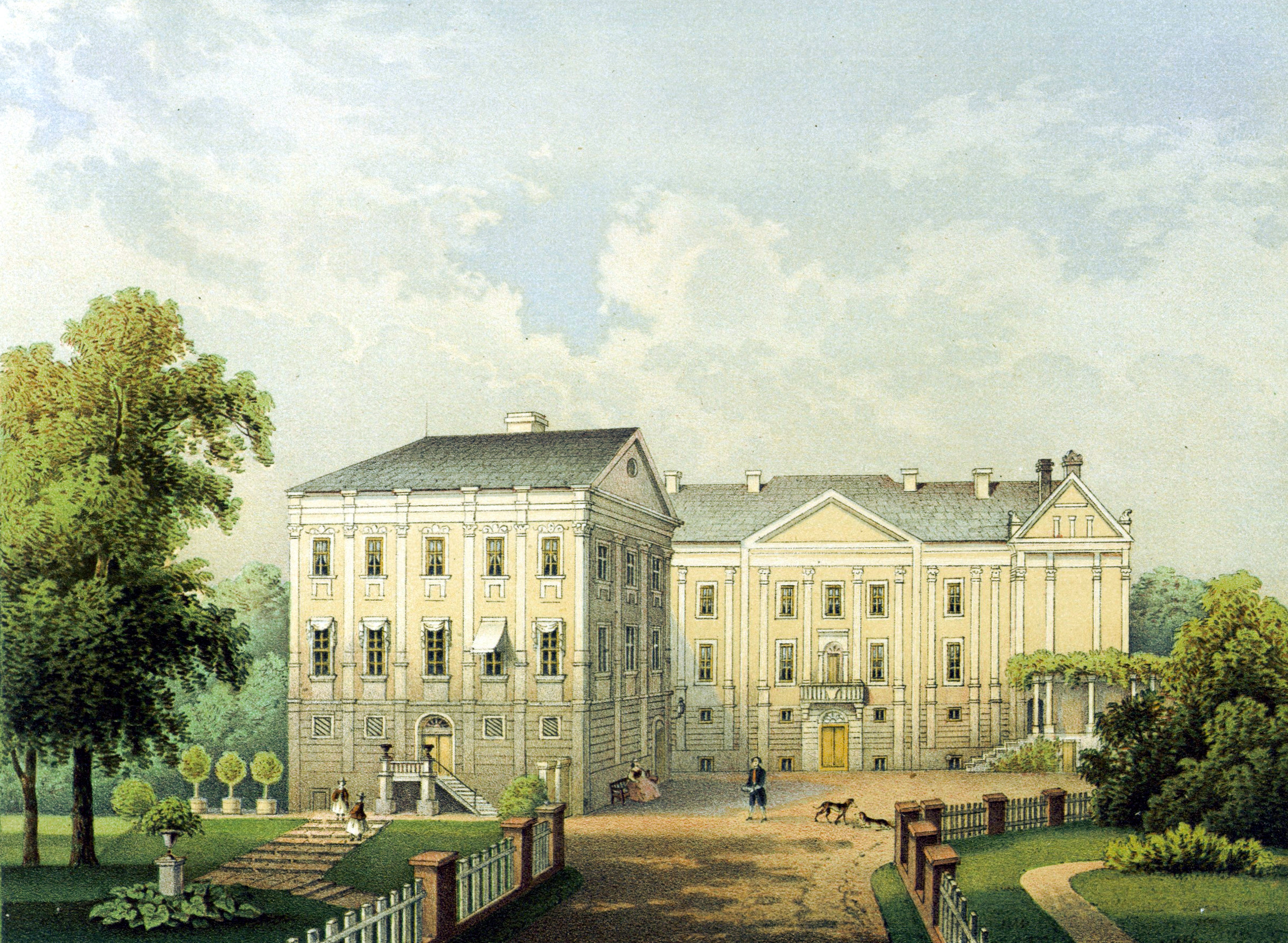
19th-century view of the Sapieha Palace, the greatest historic landmark of Wieleń

Part of Poland since the Middle Ages, Duke Władysław Odonic of Greater Poland brought the Cistercians to Wieleń in 1239. Wieleń was a private town of Polish nobility, including the Czarnkowski and Sapieha families, administratively located in the Poznań County in the Poznań Voivodeship in the Greater Poland Province of the Polish Crown. Zofia Czarnkowska erected the early Baroque Church of the Assumption of the Virgin Mary and a hospital in Wieleń, and Piotr Paweł Sapieha built a Baroque palace.

Historical population
Year	Pop.	±%
1921	2,870	—
1931	3,403	+18.6%
2010	5,869	+72.5%

As a result of the First Partition of Poland, in 1772 it was annexed by Prussia, under the Germanized name Filehne. After the successful Greater Poland uprising of 1806, it was regained by Poles and included within the short-lived Duchy of Warsaw. After its dissolution in 1815, it was re-annexed by Prussia, and from 1871 to 1919 it was also part of Germany. Until 1919, Filehne was the capital of the Filehne district in the Bromberg administrative region in the Prussian Province of Posen. According to the census of 1905, the town had a population of 4,407, of which 3,748 (85%) were Germans.

After World War I, in 1918, Poland regained independence, and the Greater Poland Uprising broke out, whose goal was to reunite the region with Poland. On January 18, 1919, the town was captured by Polish insurgents, and afterwards most of the town was restored to Poland and became part of the Poznań Voivodeship. The border between Germany and Poland ran along the Noteć river and therefore, the small part of the town lying north of the river, including the Prussian Eastern Railway station of Filehne Nord remained in Germany as part of the Netzekreis district in the Prussian Province of Grenzmark Posen-West Prussia. Gradually, new building activities began in the German part of Filehne, and people (some of whom had lost their properties in the Polish part) were successfully settled, with subsidies from the state. In 1925, only 62 inhabitants lived here, in 1933 there were 749. On December 23, 1927, the German part of Filehne became an independent municipality with the name Deutsch Filehne. In 1937, the name was shortened to Filehne.

After the joint German-Soviet invasion of Poland, which started World War II in 1939, it was occupied by Germany until 1945. Towards the end of World War II, the town was occupied by the Red Army and was restored to Poland in its entirety. The remaining German population was expelled in accordance with the Potsdam Agreement.

== Historical monuments ==
- Baroque Sapieha Palace (18th century)
- Baroque Church of the Assumption of the Virgin Mary and Saint Michael (1615–1630)
- Bismarck Tower (1902)

== Sports ==
The local football team is Fortuna Wieleń. It competes in the lower leagues.

== People ==
- Abraham Baer (1834–1894), Jewish Kantor
- Aron Freimann (1871–1948), Jewish bibliographer, historian
- Moritz Lazarus (1824–1903), Jewish philosopher
- Joseph S. Manasse (1831–1897), early settler of San Diego, California
- Louis Waldenburg (1837–1881), German physician

Residents

- Israel Meir Freimann (1830-1884), Jewish rabbi, philosopher and orientalist
- Ignacy Kozielewski, Polish teacher, soldier, poet, author of the Polish scout anthem, principal of the local Polish gymnasium in 1926–1928
- Piotr Waśko (1961-2023), Polish politician
