= Abraham Baer =

German cantor, musician, and composer

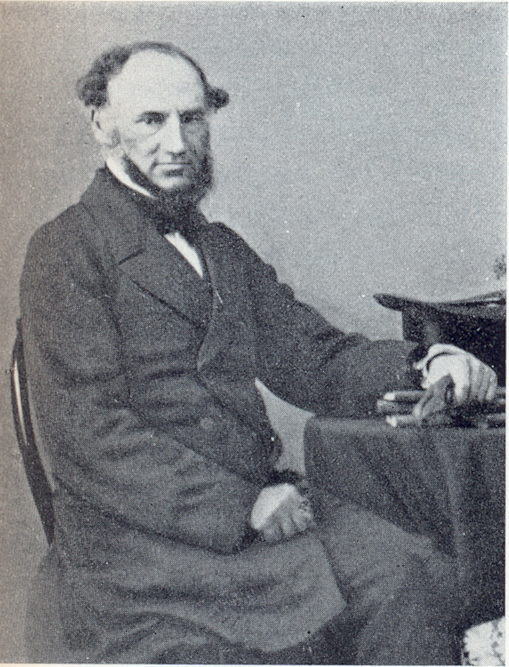
Abraham Baer

Abraham Baer (born in Filehne, Prussia, December 26, 1834; died at Gothenburg, Sweden, March 7, 1894) was a German cantor, musician, and composer. His father destined him for the rabbinate; but his love for music and the song of the synagogue caused him to choose to become a Cantor (Hazzan). At an early age he emigrated to Germany, and there under the tutelage of eminent ḥazanim prepared himself for his sacred calling. He officiated for a time at Pakosh and Schwetz in West Prussia, and at the age of twenty-three (in 1857) was called to Gothenburg. Well equipped with Hebrew and Talmudic learning, he applied himself to the acquisition of secular knowledge and the science and art of music.

His researches were especially directed to the field of Jewish traditional melodies, then but little explored. In 1871, after fifteen years of hard work, he published his work, Bā'al Tefillah, oder der Practische Vorbeter — an almost complete collection of Jewish traditional melodies, of which a second revised and enlarged edition (358 pp. folio) appeared in 1883. The work contains fifteen hundred and five melodies, in German, Polish, and Portuguese (Sephardic) versions, and is divided into four parts: (1) for the services on week-days; (2) for Shabbat; (3) for the three festivals Pesaḥ, Shabu'ot, and Sukkot; (4) for the two great holidays, Rosh Hashanah and Yom Kippur; together with an appendix containing notes on the liturgy, the reading of the Torah, and directions and formulas for writing betrothal and marriage contracts.

The collection is more complete in German and Polish melodies than in Portuguese. Occasionally a fourth version is appended, called by the compiler Neue Weise, but this seems to be his own composition or that of other contemporaneous cantors. Cantors can find therein all traditional tunes of the synagogue — most of which were theretofore to be acquired orally from older ḥazanim alone. Many of the more familiar melodies had been collected and published before Baer by Solomon Sulzer and Hirsch Weintraub; and melody No. 714, p. 160, is found even in a work published in the eighteenth century by Benedetto Marcello, called Estro Poetico Armonico, in which it appears under the head of Intonazione degli Ebrei Spagnuoli.
