= Karel Pawlik =

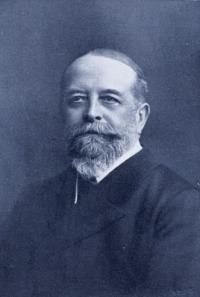
- Born: Karel Pawlík; 12 March 1849; Klatovy, Bohemia, Austrian Empire
- Died: 7 September 1914 (aged 65); Prague, Austria-Hungary
- Occupations: Obstetrician, gynaecologist

Karel Pawlík, better known as Karel Pawlik (12 March 1849 – 7 September 1914), was a Czech obstetrician and gynaecologist. He is considered one of the founders of Czech obstetrics.

== Life ==
Pawlik was born on 12 March 1849 in Klatovy. He completed his secondary education in Klatovy. He studied medicine at the University of Vienna, and surgery at Vienna General Hospital as a pupil of Theodor Billroth. He obtained his medical doctorate in 1873, and from 1877 served as assistant to Carl Braun at the university women's hospital. In 1881, he received his habilitation, and several years later was named head of the department of obstetrics at the Vienna General Polyclinic. From 1887 to 1913, he was a professor at the University of Prague. In this period, he was also Head of the Department of Gynaecology and Obstetrics at the Provincial Maternity Hospital (Czech: Zemská porodnice) in Prague.

In August 1889, he performed the first successful cystectomy on a patient suffering from papillomatosis of the bladder. He is also credited for introducing operations for cancer of the cervix uteri and for urinary incontinence. In addition, he introduced a method for freehand catheterisation of the ureters and was a pioneer of direct-vision air cystoscopy. The eponymous "Pawlik's folds" are defined as anterior columns of the vagina forming the lateral boundaries of "Pawlik's triangle" (vaginal trigone of Pawlik).

Pawlik died on 7 September 1914 in Prague. He was buried in his hometown of Klatovy.

== Published works ==
- Zwei Fälle von Sectio caesarea mit Exstirpation des Uterus, 1879 – Two cases of caesarean section with extirpation of the uterus.
- Über das Sondieren der Ureteren der weiblichen Blase aus freier Hand ohne vorbereitende Operation, 1881.
- Über die Operation der Blasenscheidenfisteln, 1882 – On an operation for vesicovaginal fistula.
- Zur Frage der Behandlung der Uteruscarcinome, 1882 – On treatment for uterine cancer.
- Exstirpation des Uterus und des Beckenzellgewebes, 1889 – Extirpation of the uterus and pelvic subcutaneous tissue.
- Über Blasenexstirpation, 1891 – On bladder extirpation.
