= Ivanovice na Hané =

- Town
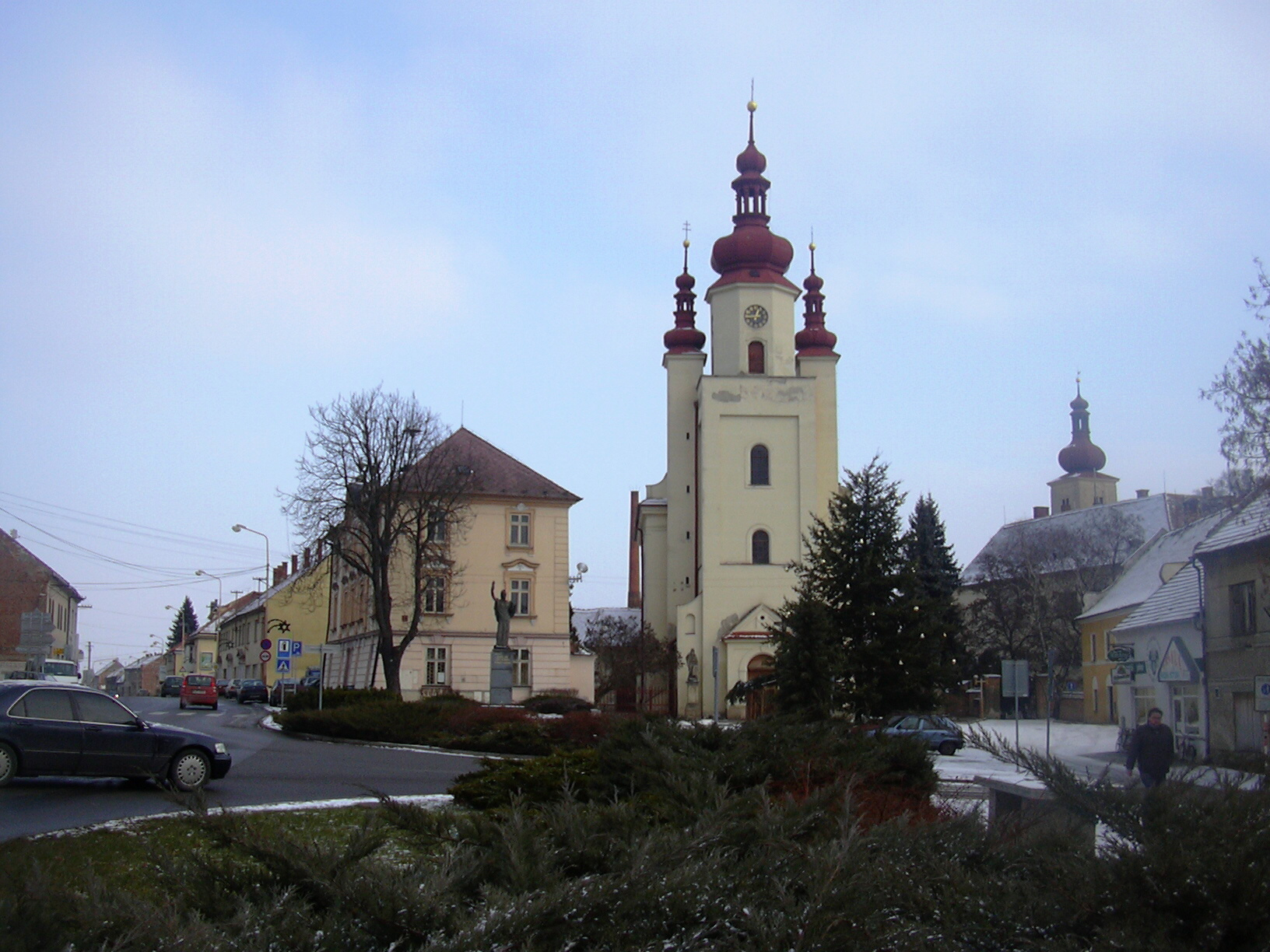
- Town square with the Church of Saint Andrew

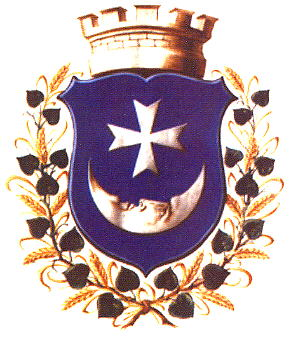
- Flag Coat of arms

- Location in the Czech Republic
- Coordinates: 49°18′20″N 17°5′36″E
- Country: Czech Republic
- Region: South Moravian
- District: Vyškov
- First mentioned: 1183

Government
  - Mayor: Vlastislav Drobílek

Area
  - Total: 21.43 km^{2} (8.27 sq mi)
- Elevation: 214 m (702 ft)

Population (2026-01-01)
  - Total: 2,996
  - Density: 139.8/km^{2} (362.1/sq mi)
- Time zone: UTC+1 (CET)
  - Summer (DST): UTC+2 (CEST)
- Postal code: 683 23
- Website: www.ivanovicenahane.cz

Ivanovice na Hané (Czech pronunciation: [ˈɪvanovɪtsɛ ˈna ɦanɛː]; German: Eiwanowitz in der Hanna) is a town in Vyškov District in the South Moravian Region of the Czech Republic. It has about 3,000 inhabitants.

== Administrative division ==
Ivanovice na Hané consists of two municipal parts (in brackets population according to the 2021 census):

- Ivanovice na Hané (2,388)
- Chvalkovice na Hané (509)

== Geography ==
Ivanovice na Hané is located about 7 kilometres (4 mi) northeast of Vyškov and 32 km (20 mi) northeast of Brno. It lies mostly in the Vyškov Gate, only the southern part of the municipal territory extends into the Litenčice Hills. The Haná River flows through the town.

== History ==
Ivanovice was founded around 950. It first appeared in the written record in 1183 as a possession of the Knights Hospitaller. They gave it various privileges in 1302 and during their rule, Ivanovice prospered. In 1425, the town was confiscated from them. It changed owners frequently in the following centuries.

During the Thirty Years' War, Ivanovice was severely damaged and lost its significance. The economic development started again in the 19th century. In 1909, Ivanovice was promoted to a town by Franz Joseph I of Austria and changed its name to Ivanovice na Hané.

In 1857, about 23 percent of the town's population was Jewish. The Jewish population declined to 64 individuals by 1930, and the remaining Jews were likely deported to the Theresienstadt Ghetto during the Holocaust. Many eventually perished in death camps to the east.

== Demographics ==
Historical population

| Year | Pop. | ±% |
|---|---|---|
| 1869 | 2,757 | — |
| 1880 | 3,184 | +15.5% |
| 1890 | 3,416 | +7.3% |
| 1900 | 3,543 | +3.7% |
| 1910 | 3,784 | +6.8% |

| Year | Pop. | ±% |
|---|---|---|
| 1921 | 3,753 | −0.8% |
| 1930 | 3,979 | +6.0% |
| 1950 | 3,342 | −16.0% |
| 1961 | 3,381 | +1.2% |
| 1970 | 3,152 | −6.8% |

| Year | Pop. | ±% |
|---|---|---|
| 1980 | 3,139 | −0.4% |
| 1991 | 2,988 | −4.8% |
| 2001 | 2,904 | −2.8% |
| 2011 | 2,844 | −2.1% |
| 2021 | 2,897 | +1.9% |

Source: Censuses

== Transport ==
The D1 motorway from Brno to Ostrava runs next the town.

Ivanovice na Hané is located on the railway lines Brno–Šumperk and Vyškov–Uničov.

== Sights ==
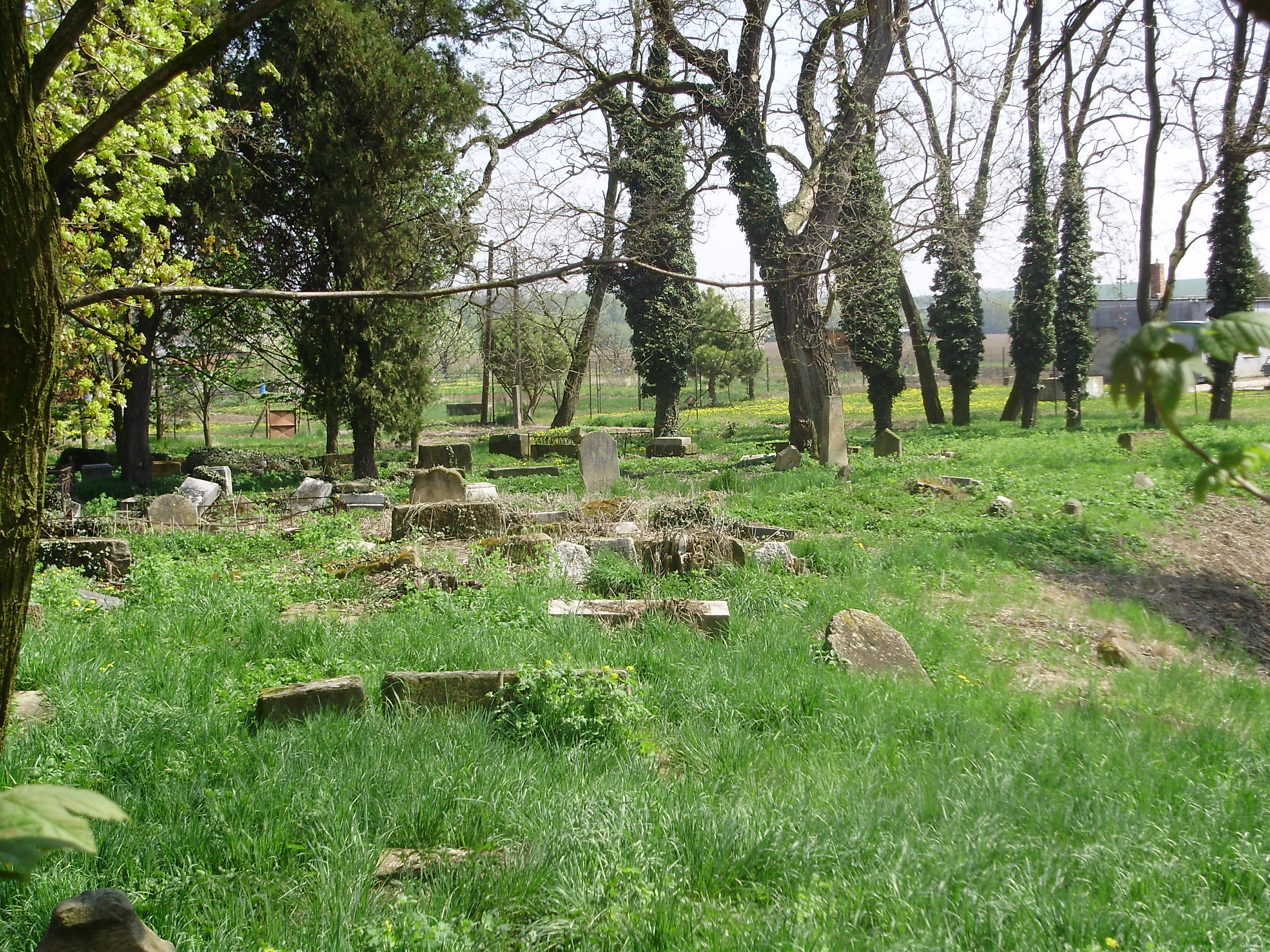
Jewish cemetery

The main landmark of the town is the Church of Saint Andrew. The Renaissance-Baroque church from the 16th and 18th centuries was built on Gothic base. The bell tower with Baroque sculptures was added in 1759.

The Ivanovice na Hané Castle was built in the Renaissance style in 1608–1611 by reconstruction of a water fortress from the 14th century. It has valuable arcade galleries. Nowadays the castle is privately owned and inaccessible.

The Jewish presence is commemorated by the former synagogue and Jewish cemetery. The synagogue is one of the most valuable buildings in the town. Nowadays it is used by the Apostolic Church. The Jewish cemetery is located on the eastern outskirts of the town. The oldest preserved tombstones are from the early 17th century.

== Notable people ==
- Gustav Karpeles (1848–1909), writer
- Bedřich Antonín Wiedermann (1883–1951), organist and composer
- Ladislav Kopřiva (1897–1971), politician
