= Louis Waldenburg =

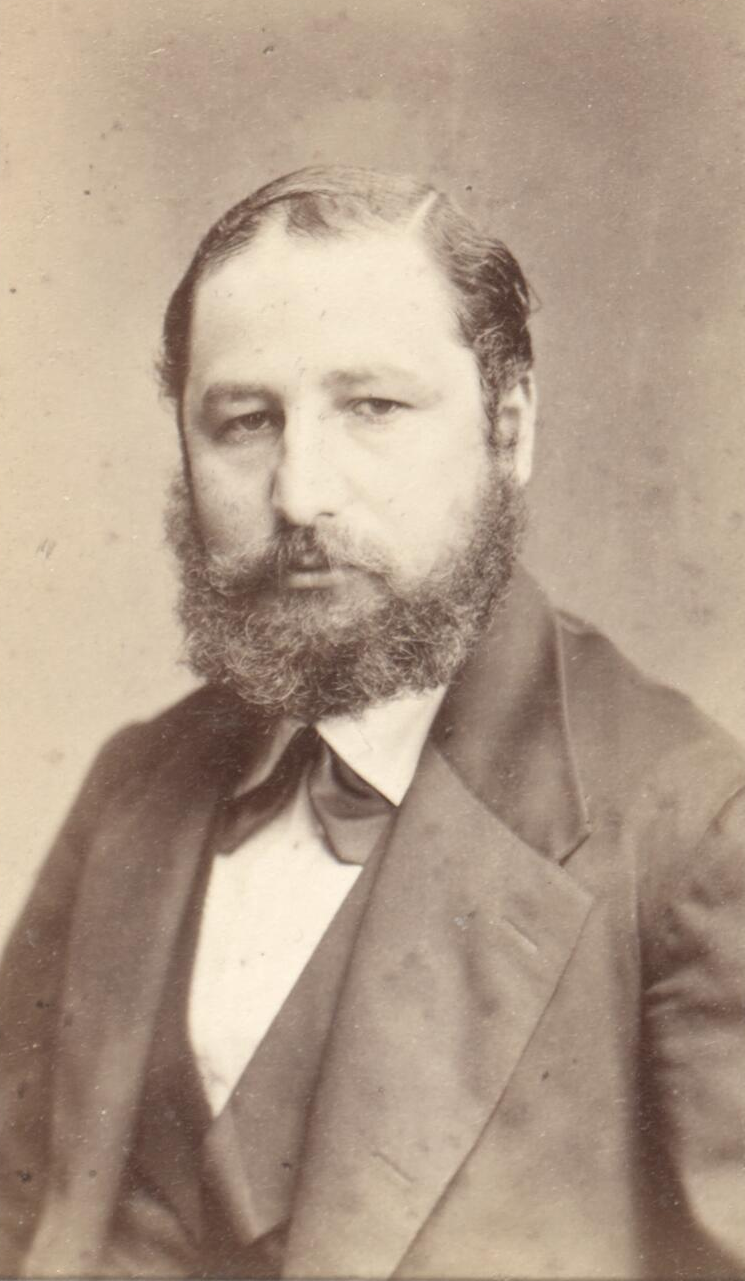
Louis Waldenburg in 1876 from an album gifted to Charles Darwin

Louis Waldenburg (31 July 1837 – 14 April 1881) was a German medical doctor who specialized in diseases of the chest and throat. He developed several instruments including an esophagoscope and an angiometer. He served as a professor at the Charité hospital in Berlin from 1871.

== Biography ==
Waldenburg was born in Filehne, Posen. He graduated from the University of Berlin (M.D. 1860) with a thesis titled "De origine et structura membranarum, quae in tubercullis capsulisque verminosis involucrum praebent". After a postgraduate course at Heidelberg he established himself in Berlin as a specialist in chest and throat diseases. From 1864 to 1868 he co-edited the Allgemeine Medizinische Central-Zeitung (General Medical Center Newspaper). In 1865 he earned the title of Privatdozent at Berlin University. In 1868 he designed a endoscope for examining the larynx and esophagus which he adapted with a mirror and telescoping tube later. From 1868 until his death he edited the Berliner Klinische Wochenschrift (Berlin Clinical Weekly). In 1871 he was appointed assistant professor, and in 1877 department physician, at the Charité hospital in Berlin.

Among Waldenburg's many works:

- "De origine et structura membranarum, quæ in tuberculis capsulisque verminosis involucrum præbent," a prize essay at the University of Berlin, 1859.
- "Über Blutaustritt und Aneurysmenbildung, durch Parasiten bedingt" ("Blood Leakage and Aneurysms Caused by Parasites"), in Archiv für Anatomie und Physiologie, 1860.
- "Über Structur und Ursprung der Wurmhaltigen Cysten" ("Structure and Origin of Worm-Containing Cysts"), in Archiv für Pathologische Anatomie und Physiologie und für Klinische Medicin, 1862.
- Lehrbuch der Respiratorischen Therapie (Textbook of Respiratory Therapy), Berlin, 1864 (second edition 1872).
- Die Tuberkulose, die Lungenschwindsucht und Scrofulose (Tuberculosis, Pulmonary Consumption and Scrofulosis), Berlin, 1869.
- Die Pneumatische Behandlung der Respirations- und Circulations-Krankheiten (Pneumatic Treatment of Respiratory and Circulatory Diseases), Berlin, 1875 (second edition 1880).

Waldenburg died in Berlin on 14 April 1881.

== Works ==
- Handbuch der allgemeinen und speciellen Arzneiverordnungs-Lehre : mit besonderer Berücksichtigung der neuesten Arzneimittel und der neuesten Pharmacopoeen (Manual of General and Special Drug Prescription, with Special Focus on the Newest Drugs and Pharmacopoeias).
  - 7. Aufl. / der Arzneiverordnungslehre von Posner, Louis und Simon, Carl Ed. Berlin : Hirschwald, 1870. Digital edition of the University and State Library Düsseldorf.
  - 8., neu umgearb. u. verm. Aufl., Berlin : Hirschwald, 1873 Digital edition of the University and State Library Düsseldorf.
