= Jacob Ettlinger =

German rabbi and author (1798-1871)

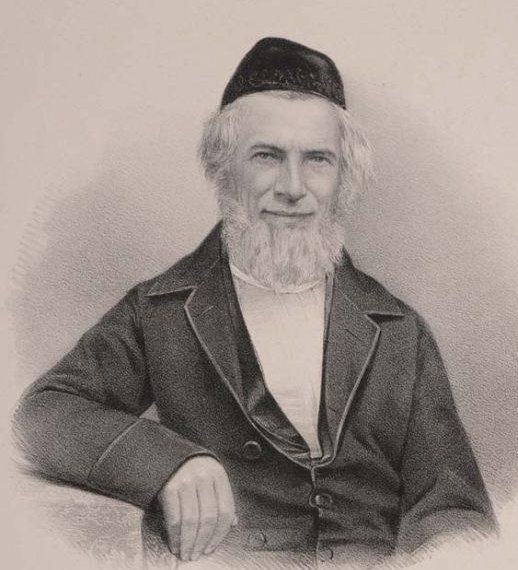
- Rabbi Jacob Ettlinger
- Born: 17 March 1798; Karlsruhe, Baden
- Died: 7 December 1871 (aged 73); Altona, Prussia
- Spouse: Nanette Wormser

Jacob Ettlinger (17 March 1798 – 7 December 1871) (Hebrew: יעקב עטטלינגער) was an Ashkenazi rabbi and author, and one of the leaders of Orthodox Judaism. He is sometimes referred to as the Aruch la-Ner (ערוך לנר), after his best-known publication.

== Biography ==
Ettlinger was born in Karlsruhe, Baden, and died in Altona, Prussia. He received his early education from his father Aaron, who was Klausrabbiner (rabbi of a small synagogue) in Karlsruhe. Aaron was also a recognized Talmudical scholar who was steeped in Kabbalah.

He then went to study under the Rabbi of Karlsruhe, Rabbi Asher Wallerstein, the son of the famed Shaagas Aryeh. Wallerstein was also the Chief Rabbi of the entire Grand Duchy of Baden. Ettlinger remained his student until the age of 18.

Ettlinger rounded off his Talmudical education in the yeshiva of Abraham Bing in Würzburg, one of the most significant Torah centers in Germany. While there, he attended the University of Würzburg, mainly studying philosophy. He was thus among the earliest German rabbis who possessed academic training. It should be pointed out, however, that he never received any formal degree.

The fact that Ettlinger stayed fervently Orthodox, even though he attended university, was considered by most to be an anomaly. Kaufmann Kohler reports that the saying was current that "Satan made him go through the university and come forth so immune and loyal, as to lure all the rest of [the] modern Rabbis to pursue those studies which caused their disloyalty to Modern Judaism".

In 1826 he was appointed Kreisrabbiner (district rabbi) of Ladenburg, with his seat in Mannheim, where he was at the same time chief prebendary (Klausprimator). This position he held until he succeeded Akiba Israel Wertheimer as Chief Rabbi of Altona, where he officiated from 1836 until his death. His ambit as Ashkenazi Chief Rabbi comprised Holstein and Schleswig and until 1864 also Denmark. In this position he became one of the most prominent representatives of German Orthodoxy.

His yeshiva was attended by a great many students preparing for the ministry, and many of them became leaders of Orthodoxy. Samson Raphael Hirsch was his disciple in Mannheim, and Azriel Hildesheimer in Altona. Five of his sons-in-law became prominent Orthodox rabbis: Joseph Isaacsohn of Rotterdam, Salomon Cohn of Schwerin, Israel Meir Freimann of Ostrowo, Moses Löb Bamberger of Kissingen and Markus Mordechai Horovitz of Frankfurt. He was the last German rabbi who acted as civil judge. Much against his will, the Danish government, to which Altona then belonged, abolished this right of the Altona Rabbi in 1863. The purity of his character and the sincerity of his religious views were acknowledged even by his opponents.

=== Death ===
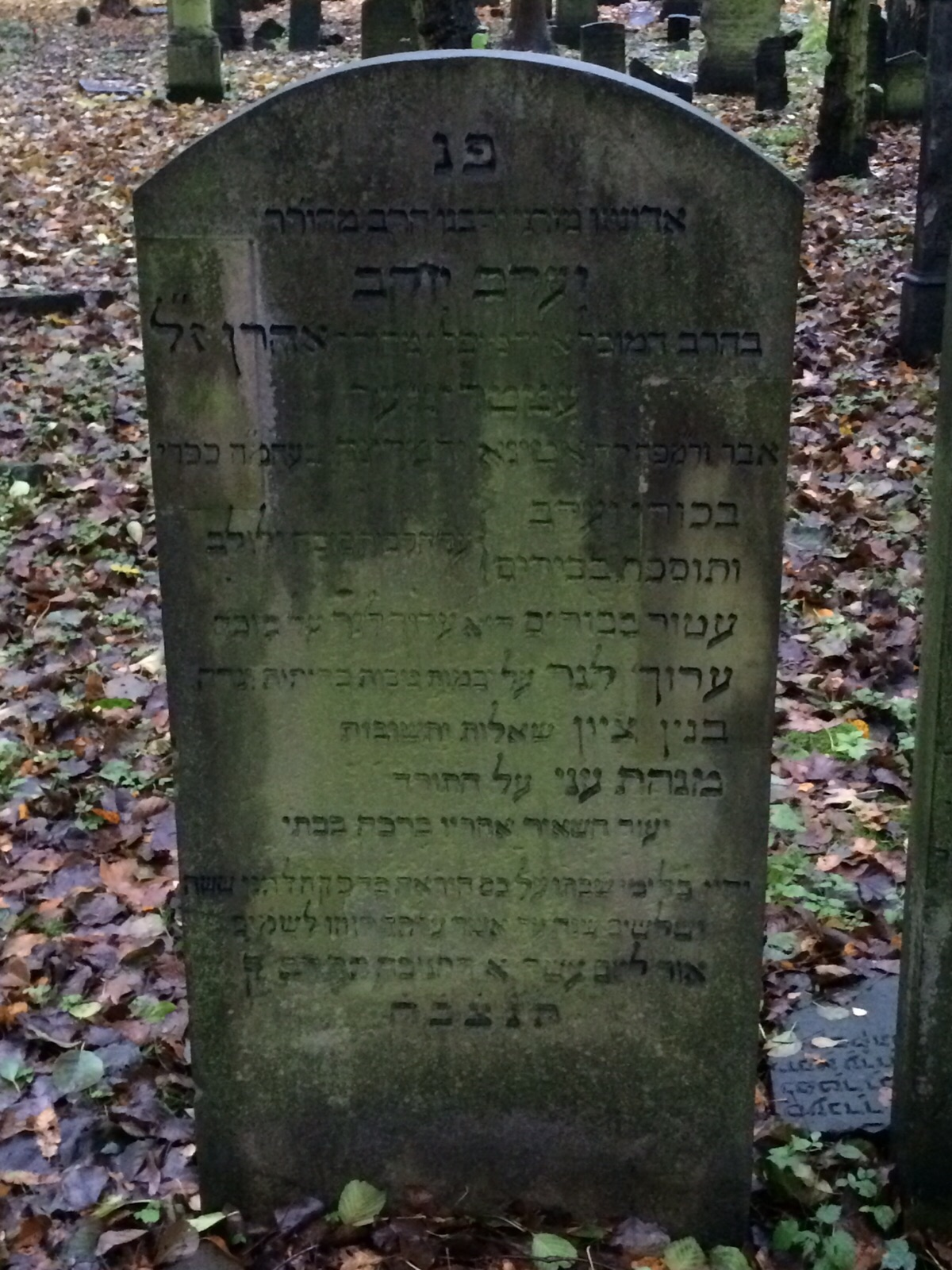
Tombstone (Matzevah) of Rabbi Jacob Ettlinger, in Hamburg, Germany

In his will, Ettlinger requested that he not be described as having been a "Tzaddik" (righteous individual), and that the inscription on his tombstone should contain merely the titles of his works and a statement of the number of years during which he was rabbi of Altona. He further asked that the four capital punishments (stoning, burning, decapitation and asphyxiation) be performed symbolically on his body.

== Views ==
=== Clashes with the Reform movement ===
Ettlinger became one of the strongest opponents of the early Reform Judaism movement, and headed a protest of 173 rabbis against the Brunswick Conference of 1844. In the following year he established the first organ of Orthodox Judaism, Der treue Zionswächter, Organ zur Wahrung der Interessen des gesetzestreuen Judenthums with a Hebrew language supplement, Shomer Tziyon ha-Ne'eman, edited by S. J. Enoch.

He was a firm defender of Orthodox tradition. A typical story is reported by Abraham Geiger, who formed Ettlinger's acquaintance as a student in 1829. At a school examination a teacher said that Joseph's brothers had acted in an unbrotherly fashion, whereupon Ettlinger rebuked him indignantly for speaking ill of the Twelve Tribes of Israel.

=== Attitude towards Kabbalah ===
Ettlinger expressed a positive view towards Kabbalah, as can be judged from his first work, Bikkurei Yaakov. In the preface, Etllinger explains that he chose the title because it had the numerical value of Jacob and Rachel, who are mystically represented in the law of the Sukkah, with which the book deals. A similar belief in the doctrines of the Kabbalah is expressed in a sermon in which he urged early burial, because as long as the body remains unburied evil spirits have power over it.

== Notable rulings ==
In his legal responsa, Ettlinger dealt with many complex halachic dilemmas, often presenting novel theories to resolve them.

In one teshuvah, he responded to Rabbi Zvi Hirsch Kalischer, who was attempting to attract support for his movement to build the Third Temple and offer sacrifices there. Ettlinger expressed strong opposition. Among his arguments was that most sacrifices would not be valid in any case. Ettlinger posited that since the Mishna states that for a sacrifice to be valid it must be offered with intent to generate reiach (literally meaning "scent"), any sacrifice offered during the period of exile will be automatically invalidated, since the Torah clearly states that God declared he would no longer "inhale" the "scent" of the offerings in the epoch of exile, thus rendering any intent of generating reiach void and farcical.

In the famed Machine Matzo Controversy, Ettlinger ruled that machine-made Matzo could be used on Passover. He writes,

"If they are disgusted with it because it is a new thing; we, the rabbis of Germany who are upright in their hearts... also distance [ourselves from] innovations regarding Torah and mitzvos as far as a bowshot away. However, what the experts and natural scholars innovate in regards to nature, why should we not accept the good from them, to strengthen the holes in our knowledge, to keep the mitzvos... as any understanding man could judge for himself."

Nevertheless, he instituted that the matzos' edges be cut off, so that they would appear round, like traditional matzos.

In 1859, Ettlinger was consulted about an incident where a man, claiming to be the prophet Elijah and acting on the word of God, defiled a married woman. Ettlinger was asked to determine whether the woman had acquired the status of an unfaithful wife, rendering her forbidden to her husband. Ettlinger began his response by stating: "I have reviewed all of the aspects, and it is very difficult to find a cure and a remedy for this plague of stupidity that would permit this woman to her husband." However, his final conclusion was that since the woman had believed she was acting under the express orders of God, she was to be looked at as if she had been physically compelled and had no choice in the matter.

== Aruch la-Ner ==
Ettlinger's work Aruch la-Ner, consisting of novellae on many Talmudical tractates, is one of the standard texts in Yeshivas around the world. This is most probably due to "the rigid intellectual discipline, and detailed analysis of Talmudic sources" that are the hallmark of this work. It is quoted extensively by scholars such as Elchonon Wasserman, Adin Steinsaltz, Boruch Ber Leibowitz, and Reuven Grozovsky.

== Works ==
His published works are:

- Bikkurei Yaakov (ביכורי יעקב), on the laws of Sukkot, Altona, 1836 (2d ed. with the addition of Tosefot Bikkurim, including glosses of Akiba Eiger and Seligman Baer Bamberger, Altona, 1858)
- Aruch la-Ner (ערוך לנר), glosses on various Talmudic treatises (on Yevamot, Altona, 1850; on Makkot and Keritot, Altona, 1855; on Sukkah, Altona, 1858; on Niddah, Altona, 1864; on Rosh ha-Shanah and Sanhedrin, Warsaw, 1873)
- Binyan Tziyon (בנין ציון), responsa, Altona, 1868; She'elot u-Teshuvot Binyan Tziyon ha-Chadashot, Wilna, 1874 (a continuation of the preceding) An edition with a new additional part from manuscripts and other sources with introductions, references, notes, indexes and biographies was published by Rabbi Yehuda Aharon Horovitz, Jerusalem, 1989 and 2002
- Minchat Ani (מנחת עני), homilies, Altona, 1874
- Mincha Arucha (מנחה ערוכה) sermons, articles and brochures translated into Hebrew by Aviezri Wolf. Edited and published by Rabbi Yehuda Aharon Horovitz, Jerusalem 2008.

He published various sermons in German, among them Antrittsrede, Gehalten in der Grossen Synagoge zu Altona, Altona, 1836; Rede beim Trauergottesdienst beim Ableben Friedrich III, Altona, 1840; and numerous articles in the Treue Zionswächter, a collection of which was published by L. M. Bamberger, Abhandlungen und Reden, Schildberg, 1899

== Bibliography ==
- Horovitz, Rabbi Yehuda Aharon: Mevo Mitoldotav "Ketzot Darkei Rabeni Yaakov Yokev Ettlinger." Binyan Zion, Jerusalem 2002, Vol. 1 P. 8 - 52.
