= Josef Klička =

Czech organist, violinist, composer, conductor and pedagogue

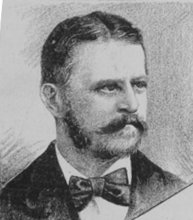
Josef Klička (1884)

Josef Klička (15 December 1855, Klatovy, Kingdom of Bohemia – 28 March 1937, Klatovy) was a Czech organist, violinist, composer, conductor and pedagogue. He produced several large organ compositions in the style of late romanticism; these have been recorded on CD.

A graduate in organ-playing from the Conservatory in Prague, Klička subsequently worked as organist and conductor and eventually became acting professor at his old school. This was from 1892 to 1895, as deputy for Dvořák, then in the USA.

Klička's son was Václav Klička (1882–1953), a harpist. Václav also taught for some years at the Prague Conservatory.

== Selected works ==
Opera

- Spanilá mlynářka (Die schöne Müllerin; The Lovely Maid of the Mill) (1888)

Chamber music

- Scherzo for 3 violins and piano, op.63

Organ

- Concert Fantasia in C minor, op.59
- Concert Fantasia in G minor
- Concert Fantasia in F♯ minor, op.36
- Concert Fantasia on the St. Wenceslas Chorale (1890)
- Fantasia on Bedřich Smetana's Symphonic Poem "Vyšehrad", op.33
- Legend in D major, op.49
- Legend in D minor, op.54
- Legend in B minor, op.98
- 10 Preludes and Fugues
