= Levi Bodenheimer =

German rabbi (1807–1867)

Levi Bodenheimer (December 13, 1807, at Karlsruhe – August 25, 1867, at Krefeld) was a German consistorial grand rabbi at Krefeld (1844–1855), in the Rhine province. He occupied the position of rabbi at Hildesheim between 1831 and 1844, at last in charge of the newly create Hildesheim Land Rabbinate (established in 1842).

Bodenheimer published:

- "Das Testament Unter Benennung einer Schenkung, nach Rabbinischen Quellen" (Krefeld, 1848)
- "Das Paraphrastische der Arabischen Uebersetzung des R. Saadja Gaon"
- The Blessing of Moses
- The Song of Moses

The last two of these were comparisons of the translations contained in Brian Walton's Polyglot, with a special reference to the Greek and Arabic variants.
