= Klatovy =

- Town
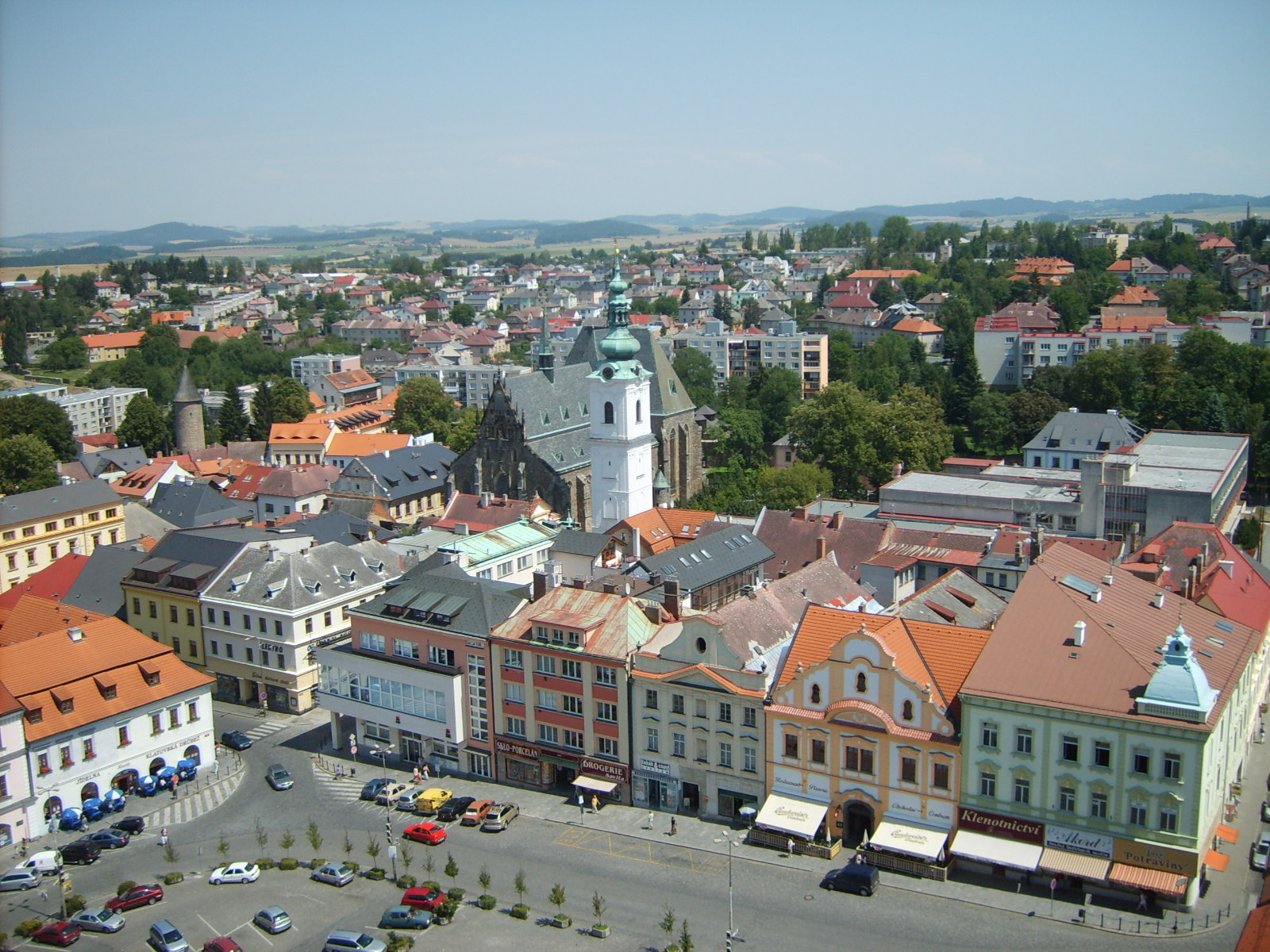
- View to the southeast

- Flag Coat of arms

- Location in the Czech Republic
- Coordinates: 49°23′43″N 13°17′42″E
- Country: Czech Republic
- Region: Plzeň
- District: Klatovy
- First mentioned: 1253

Government
  - Mayor: Rudolf Salvetr (ODS)

Area
  - Total: 80.85 km^{2} (31.22 sq mi)
- Elevation: 405 m (1,329 ft)

Population (2026-01-01)
  - Total: 22,921
  - Density: 283.5/km^{2} (734.3/sq mi)
- Time zone: UTC+1 (CET)
  - Summer (DST): UTC+2 (CEST)
- Postal code: 339 01
- Website: www.klatovy.cz

Klatovy (Czech pronunciation: [ˈklatovɪ]; German: Klattau) is a town in the Plzeň Region of the Czech Republic. It has about 23,000 inhabitants. Located on the Úhlava River, it is an industrial town and a railway junction.

Klatovy was established in the 13th century. The historic town centre is well preserved and is protected as an urban monument zone. The main landmark of Klatovy is the Church of the Immaculate Conception of the Virgin Mary and of Saint Ignatius. The complex of the Jesuit monuments, which includes the church, catacombs and a Latin school, is protected as a national cultural monument.

== Administrative division ==
Klatovy consists of 30 municipal parts (in brackets population according to the 2021 census):

- Klatovy I (1,097)
- Klatovy II (4,731)
- Klatovy III (6,616)
- Klatovy IV (4,668)
- Klatovy V (981)
- Beňovy (54)
- Chaloupky (60)
- Čínov (149)
- Dehtín (53)
- Dobrá Voda (7)
- Drslavice (109)
- Habartice (89)
- Kal (85)
- Kosmáčov (28)
- Křištín (34)
- Kvaslice (9)
- Kydliny (104)
- Lažánky (17)
- Luby (932)
- Otín (119)
- Pihovice (43)
- Sobětice (297)
- Štěpánovice (330)
- Střeziměř (67)
- Tajanov (306)
- Točník (265)
- Tupadly (176)
- Věckovice (35)
- Vícenice (108)
- Vítkovice (10)

Habartice, Kvaslice and Vítkovice, and Dobrá Voda, Křištín and Střeziměř form two exclaves of the municipal territory.

== Etymology ==
According to one theory, the name Klatovy was derived from the personal name Klát, meaning "Klát's (court)". The name Klát has then its origin in the Old Czech word klát, which meant 'stump' or 'log'. According to the second theory, the name Klatovy was derived directly from klát.

== Geography ==
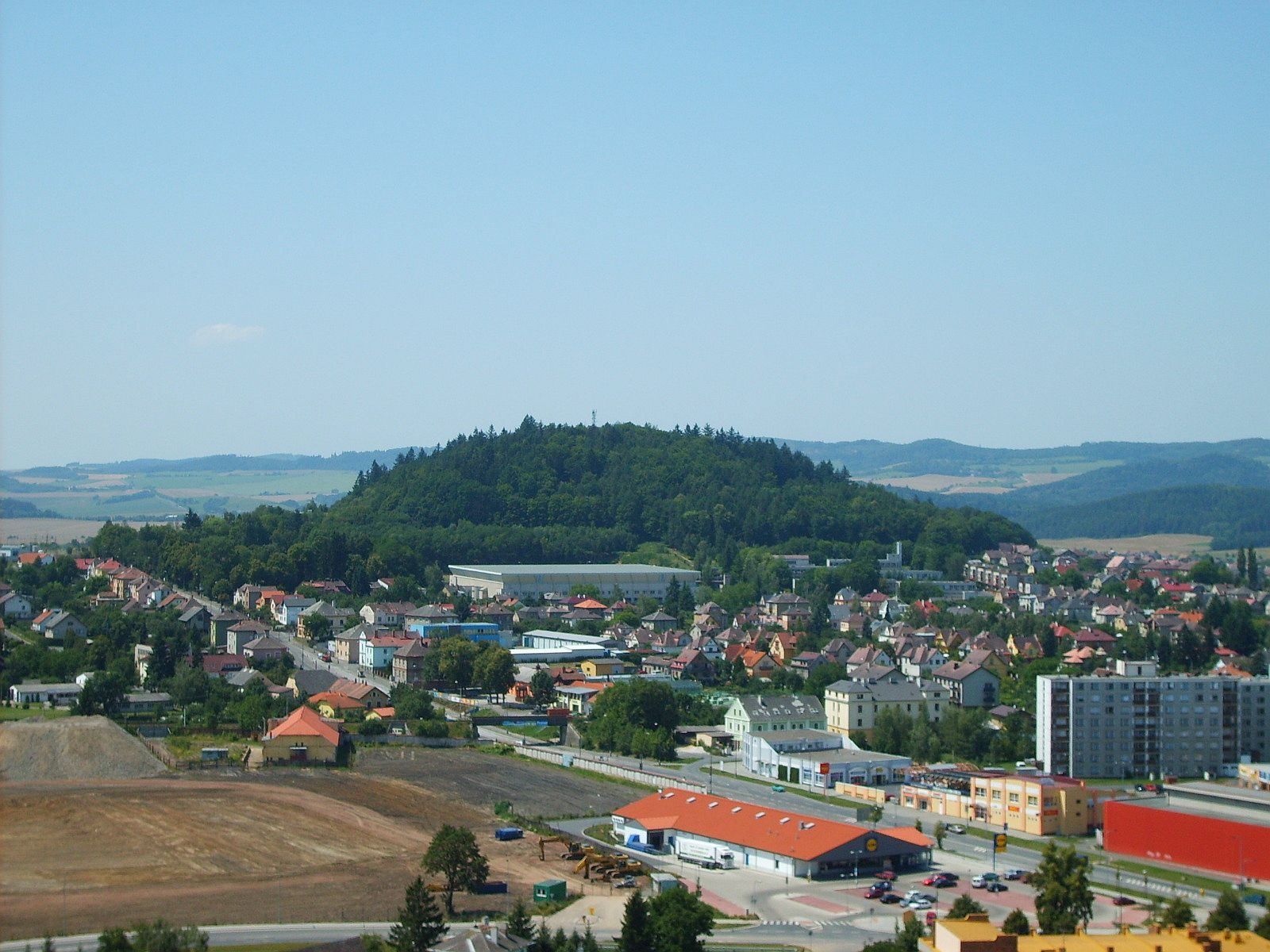
Hůrka hill

Klatovy is located about 38 kilometres (24 mi) south of Plzeň. It lies in the Švihov Highlands except for the two exclaves, which lie one in the Blatná Uplands and one in the Bohemian Forest Foothills. The highest point is the hill Boudovka at 729 m (2,392 ft) above sea level, located in the southern (Bohemian Forest Foothills) exclave. A dominant feature of the built-up area is the hill Hůrka (498 m).

The town is situated on the right bank of the Úhlava River. The stream Drnový potok, a tributary of the Úhlava, flows through the town.

== History ==
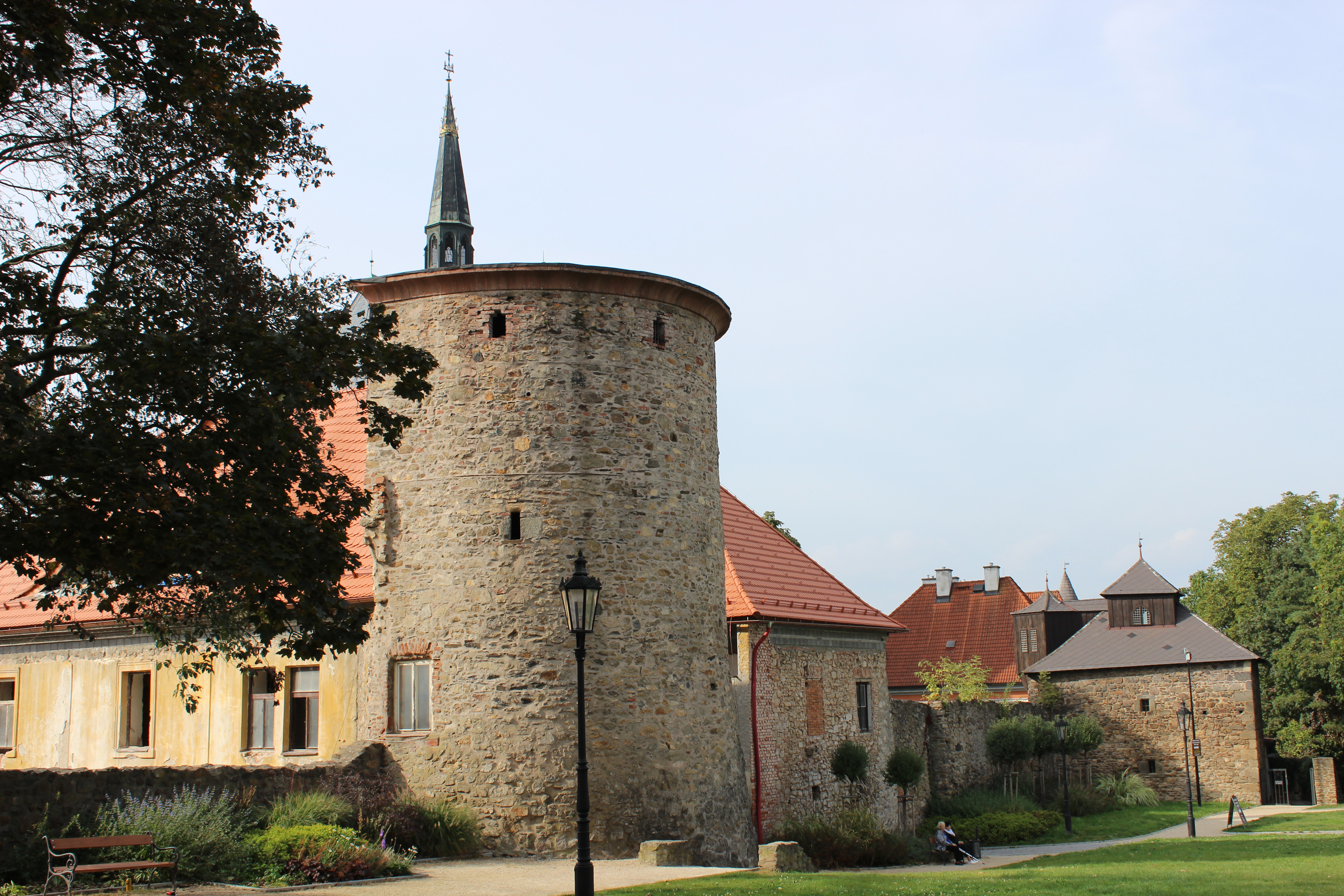
Remains of the town fortifications

The first written mention of Klatovy is from 1253, when it was a small settlement on a trade route from Bohemia to Bavaria. Between 1260 and 1263, a royal town was made from the settlement by King Ottokar II. The town walls were built and between the 13th and 16th centuries were improved. Despite the Hussite Wars and a fire in 1464, which destroyed all the suburbs, the development of the town continued. At the beginning of the 16th century, Klatovy was one of the ten most important towns in the Czech lands.

In the 16th century, Klatovy continued to flourish and many important buildings were built. But the town was damaged several fires, and the Thirty Years' War caused decline. In the mid-17th century, Jesuits came into the town and started not only building development, but also the development of education. However, in a fire in 1689 started by arsonists, all the Gothic and Renaissance monuments burned down.

In the 18th century, Klatovy became the administrative centre of the region. In the early 19th century, part of the fortifications were demolished and the town changed its architectural face. In the second half of the 19th century, Klatovy became the centre of cultural and social life. The development of trade was supported by the construction of new railway and road networks.

During World War II, Klatovy was occupied by Germany. The Germans operated a Gestapo prison in the town. In 1942, Klatovy was the centre of the resistance movement, which was harshly suppressed by the execution of 73 patriots in the Spálený Forest at the time of Reinhard Heydrich. In 1945, some parts of the town were badly damaged by bombing, and the railway station building was completely destroyed. Klatovy was liberated on 5 May 1945 by the US Army. The town's remaining German population was expelled in accordance with the Potsdam Agreement in 1945.

== Demographics ==
Historical population

Year	Pop.	±%
1869	11,964	—
1880	14,059	+17.5%
1890	14,754	+4.9%
1900	16,960	+15.0%
1910	18,620	+9.8%

Year	Pop.	±%
1921	18,085	−2.9%
1930	18,221	+0.8%
1950	17,213	−5.5%
1961	17,294	+0.5%
1970	19,087	+10.4%

Year	Pop.	±%
1980	21,744	+13.9%
1991	23,098	+6.2%
2001	23,033	−0.3%
2011	22,133	−3.9%
2021	21,579	−2.5%

Source: Censuses

== Economy ==
Historically, Klatovy is connected with the textile, leather, wood, engineering and food industries. Currently, the construction, woodworking and metalworking industries predominate. The largest employer in the town is a branch of the Rodenstock GmbH company, which manufactures spectacle lenses here. It has more than 1,000 employers.

Klatovy is famous for growing carnations. Since 1813, a large number of brightly colored varieties have been bred here, which successfully represented Klatovy at many world exhibitions.

== Transport ==
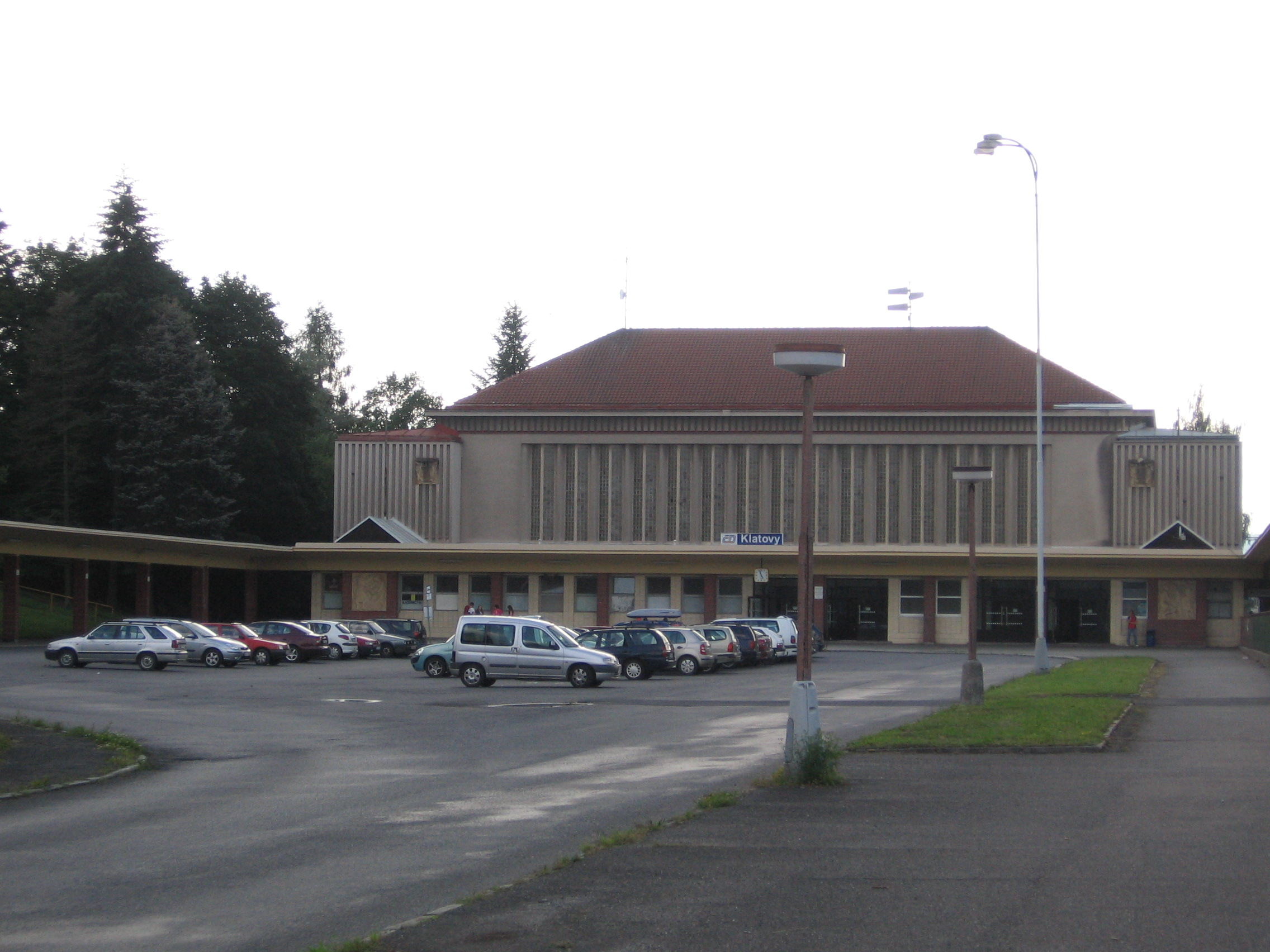
Main train station

Klatovy is a railway junction. The town has a direct connection with Prague via Plzeň. There are also regional railway lines to Železná Ruda, Domažlice and Horažďovice. The territory of Klatovy is served by five train stations and stops: Klatovy, Klatovy město, Luby u Klatov, Točník and Dehtín.

== Sport ==
The town's football club SK Klatovy 1898 is one of the oldest football clubs in the country. Nowadays it plays in the fourth tier of the Czech football system.

Klatovy is the starting point of the traditional Král Šumavy ('King of the Bohemian Forest') cycling marathon, which has been held since 1993.

== Sights ==
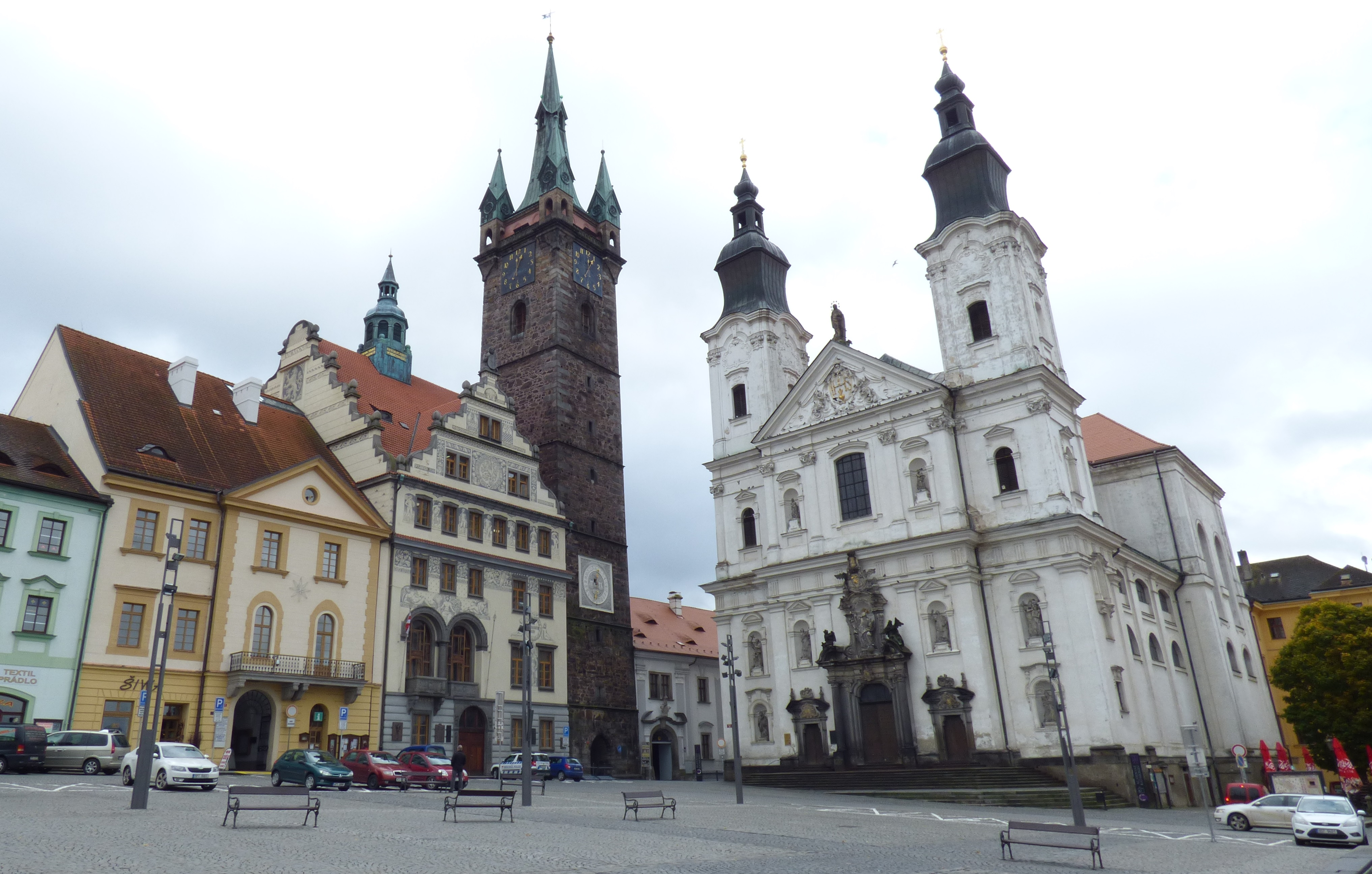
The square Náměstí Míru with the Jesuit church, Black Tower and town hall

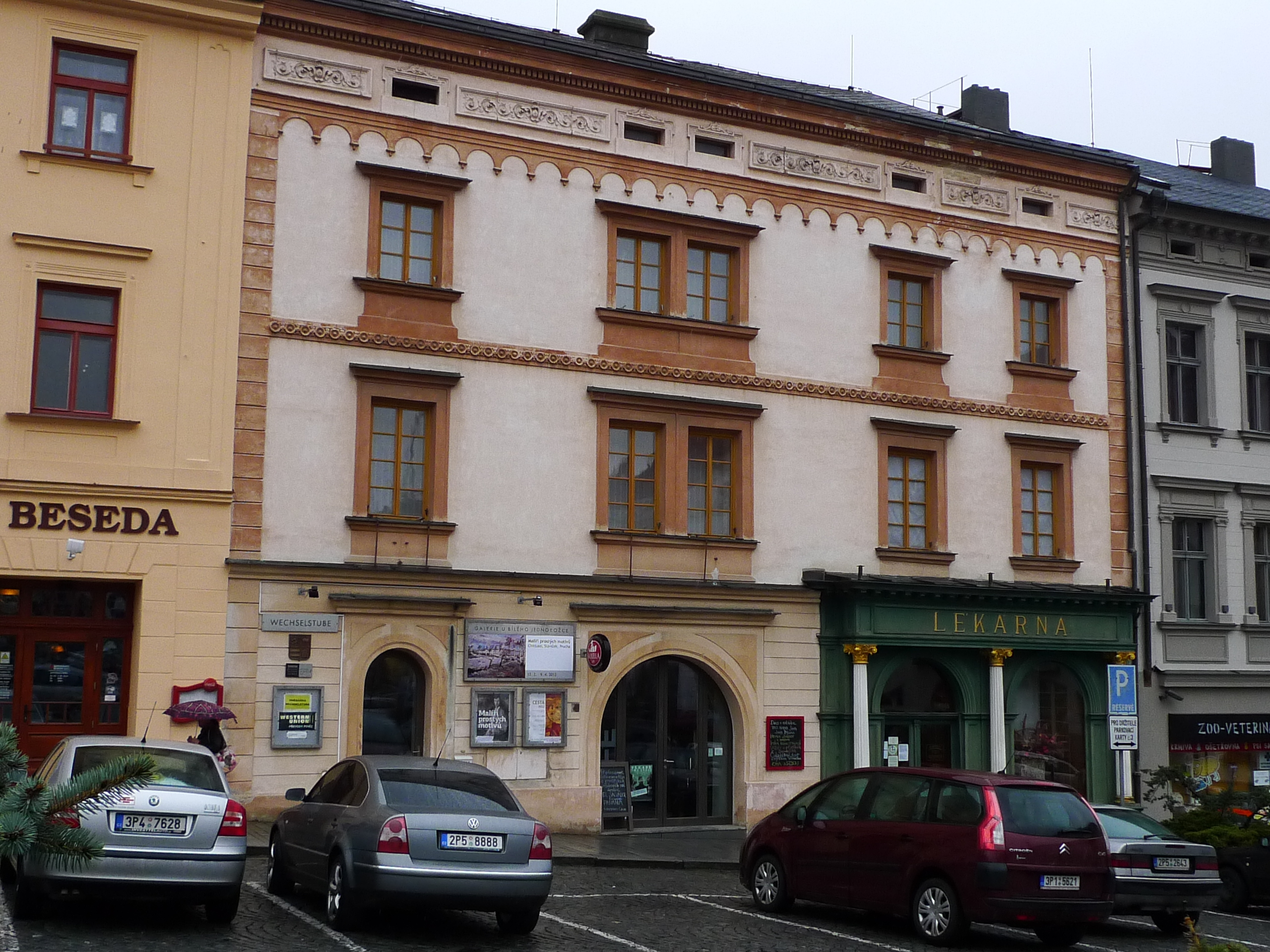
Pharmacy and gallery At the White Unicorn

The oldest part of the town surrounded by fragments of town walls is protected as an urban monument zone since 1992. The best-preserved part of the fortifications is located on the eastern side of the historic town centre, where there are two circular bastions.

One of the main landmarks of Klatovy is the Black Tower, built in 1547–1557 as a watchtower. It turned black after many fires in the history of the town. It is a five-story tower with a height of 81.6 m (268 ft) and 226 steps. Nowadays it is open to the public and serves as a lookout tower.

After the Black Tower was finished, construction of the town hall began in 1557. Many construction modifications have completely changed its appearance. The last major reconstruction in the Neo-Renaissance style took place in 1923–1925 based on the project of the architect Josef Fanta. The building still serves its original purpose.

The town museum, officially named Dr. Hostaš Museum of National History in Klatovy, is located in an Art Nouveau house built in 1905–1907.

Baroque Jesuit pharmacy called "At the White Unicorn" on the town square is now a pharmacy museum. The museum maps the history of pharmacy from 1776 until 1966, when the Jesuit pharmacy was abolished. It contains valuable equipment, mostly from the 18th century. Next to the museum is the Gallery At the White Unicorn.

=== Religious and Jesuit monuments ===
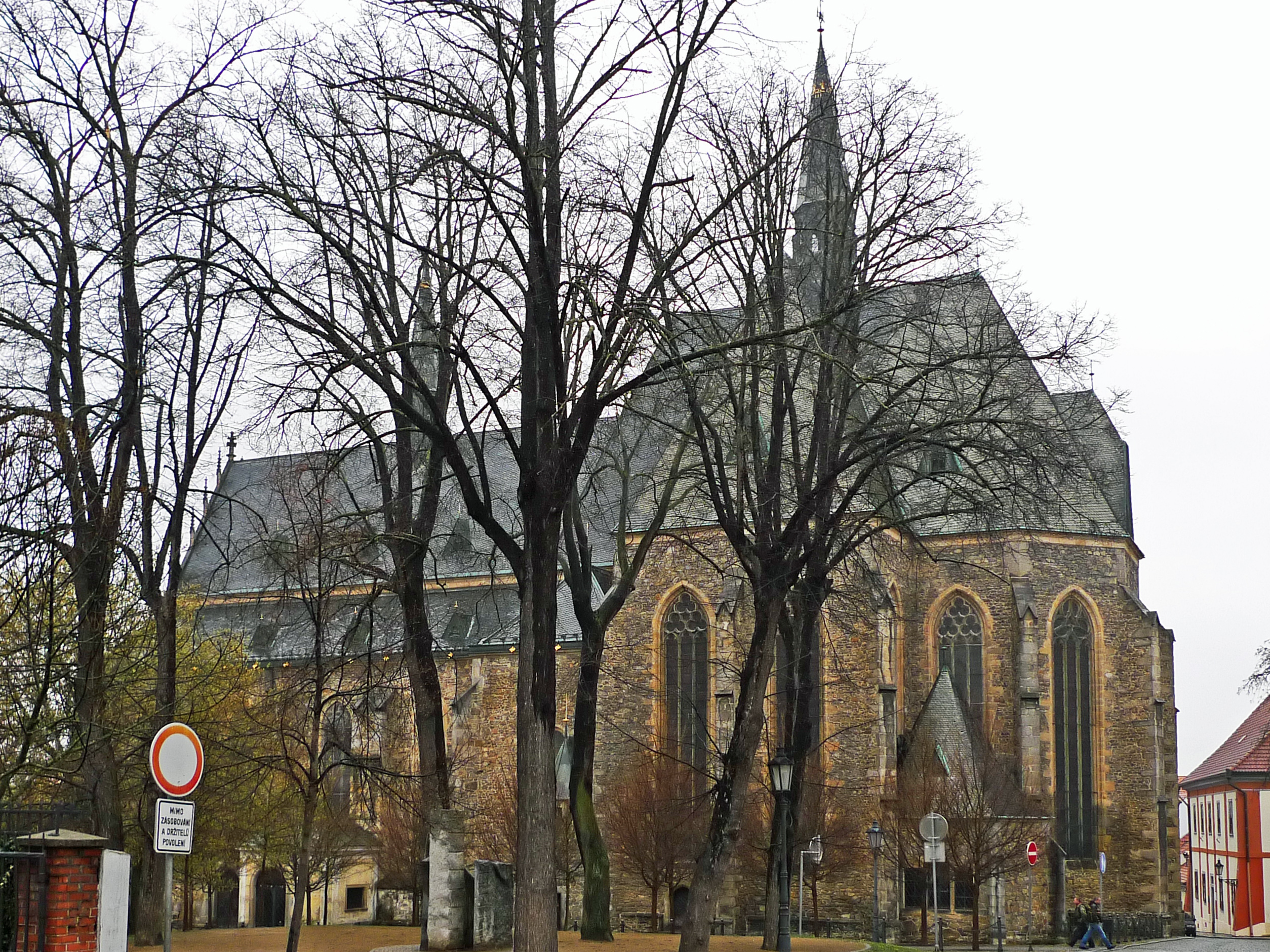
Church of the Nativity of the Virgin Mary

The Church of the Immaculate Conception of the Virgin Mary and of Saint Ignatius was built in the early Baroque style in 1655–1679 for the Jesuits. It was designed by Carlo Lurago and finished by Domenico Orsi. After it was damaged by a fire, it was reconstructed in 1826 to its current appearance. Beneath the church are extensive catacombs where the Jesuits buried members of the order from the 1670s (before the church was finished) until 1783. About 38 mummified bodies have been preserved to this day. A notable building is the former Jesuit Latin school. It was built in the Baroque style in 1719–1721 and has a Neoclassical façade. The building is used by the municipal office and the town library. Since 2026, the area of the Jesuit church, the catacombs and the Latin school is protected as a national cultural monument.

The Dominican monastery with the Church of Saint Lawrence were founded in the 14th century, but they were burned down during the Hussite Wars in 1419. They were renewed after the Thirty Years' War, but were again destroyed by a fire in 1689. The monastery complex was then finally rebuilt in the Baroque style in 1694–1709, but the monastery was abolished in 1786. Today the premises of the former monastery serves social and educational purposes. The church building, owned by the town, was reconstructed in 2000 and is used as an exhibition space.

The Church of the Nativity of the Virgin Mary was built in the Gothic style at the end of the 13th century. Renaissance and Baroque modifications were made during the building's history, then it was re-Gothised by Josef Fanta in 1898–1908. Next to the church is a separate bell tower called "White Tower", built in 1581. After a fire in 1758, it was raised and modified to its current form.

== Notable people ==
- Bohuslav Balbín (1621–1688), writer, historian and Jesuit
- Václav Matěj Kramerius (1753–1808), publisher, journalist and writer
- Josef Dobrovský (1753–1829), philologist and historian
- Franz Kiwisch von Rotterau (1814–1852), obstetrician and gynaecologist
- Josef Hlávka (1831–1908), architect
- August Breisky (1832–1889), obstetrician and gynaecologist
- Jan Ludevít Procházka (1837–1888), pianist and composer
- Johann Brotan (1843–1918), Austrian mechanical engineer
- Karel Klostermann (1848–1923), writer
- Karel Pawlik (1849–1914), obstetrician and gynaecologist
- Jaroslav Vrchlický (1853–1912), lyrical poet
- Josef Klička (1855–1937), organist, violinist and composer
- Lubor Niederle (1865–1944), archaeologist and anthropologist
- Václav Fišer (born 1947), long jumper and triple jumper
- Ivana Sekyrová (born 1971), long-distance runner
- Petr Frydrych (born 1988), javelin thrower
- Tereza Krejčiříková (born 1996), footballer

== Twin towns – sister cities ==
Klatovy is twinned with:

- Cham, Germany
- Poligny, France

== Gallery ==
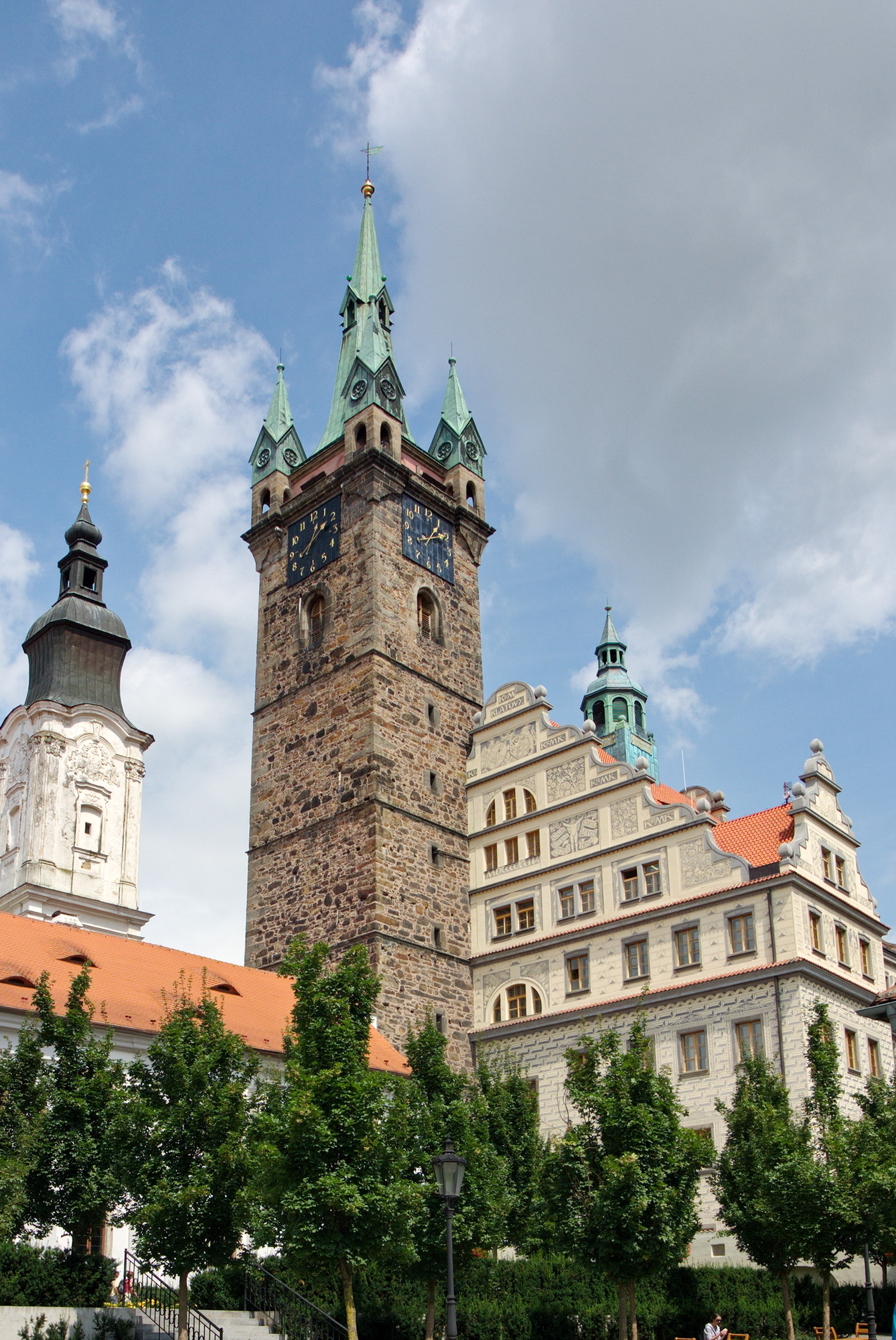
Black Tower

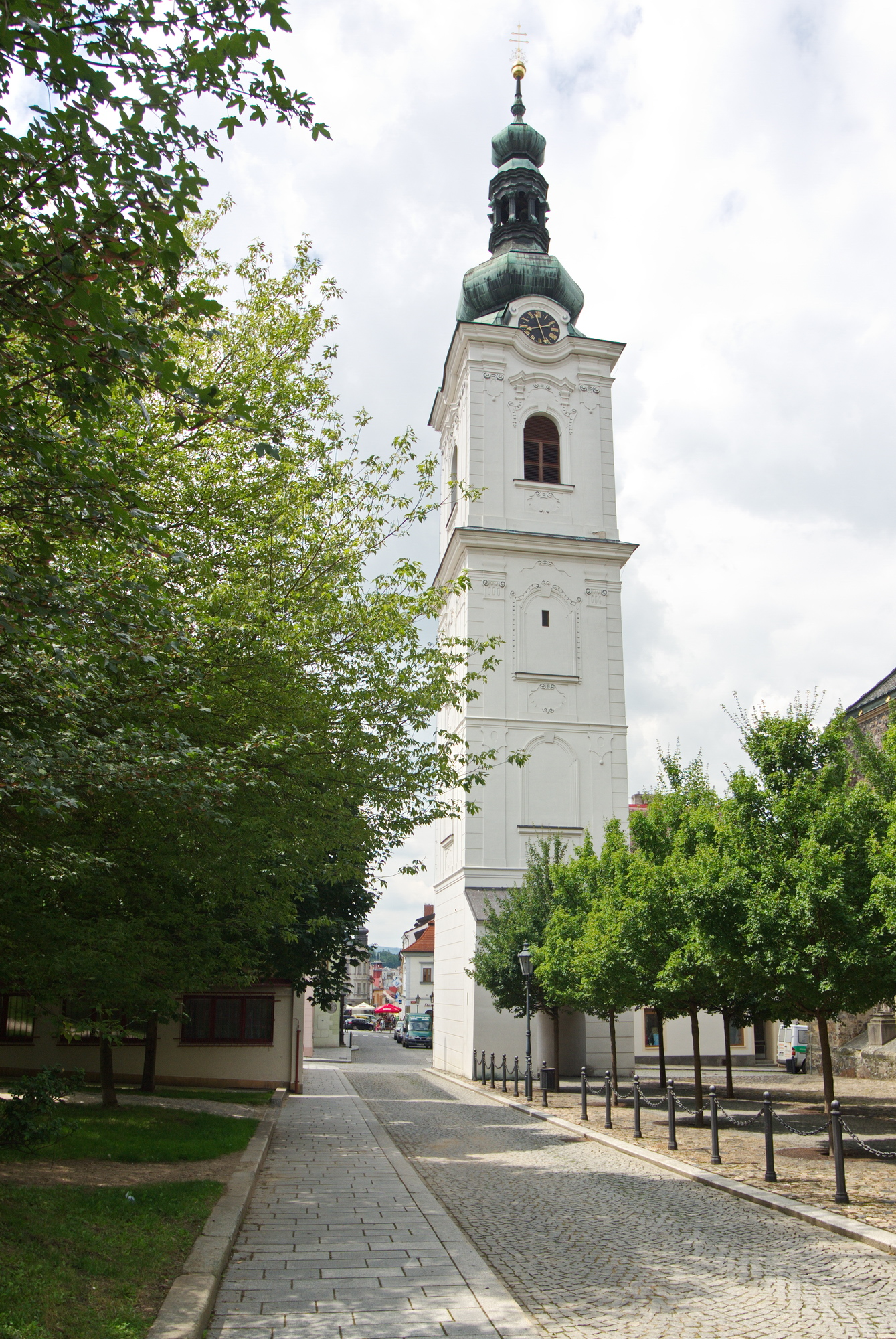
White Tower

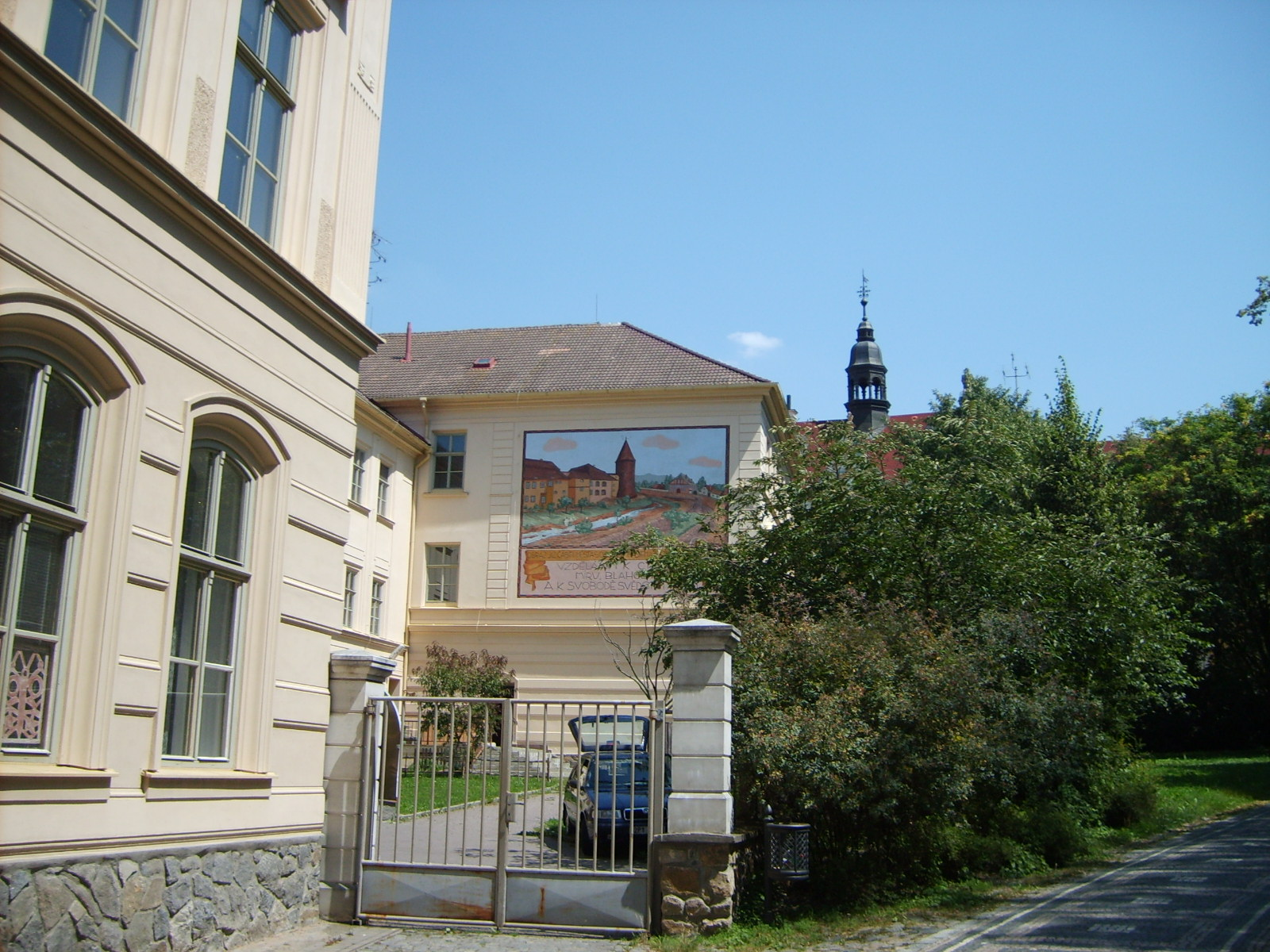
Town museum

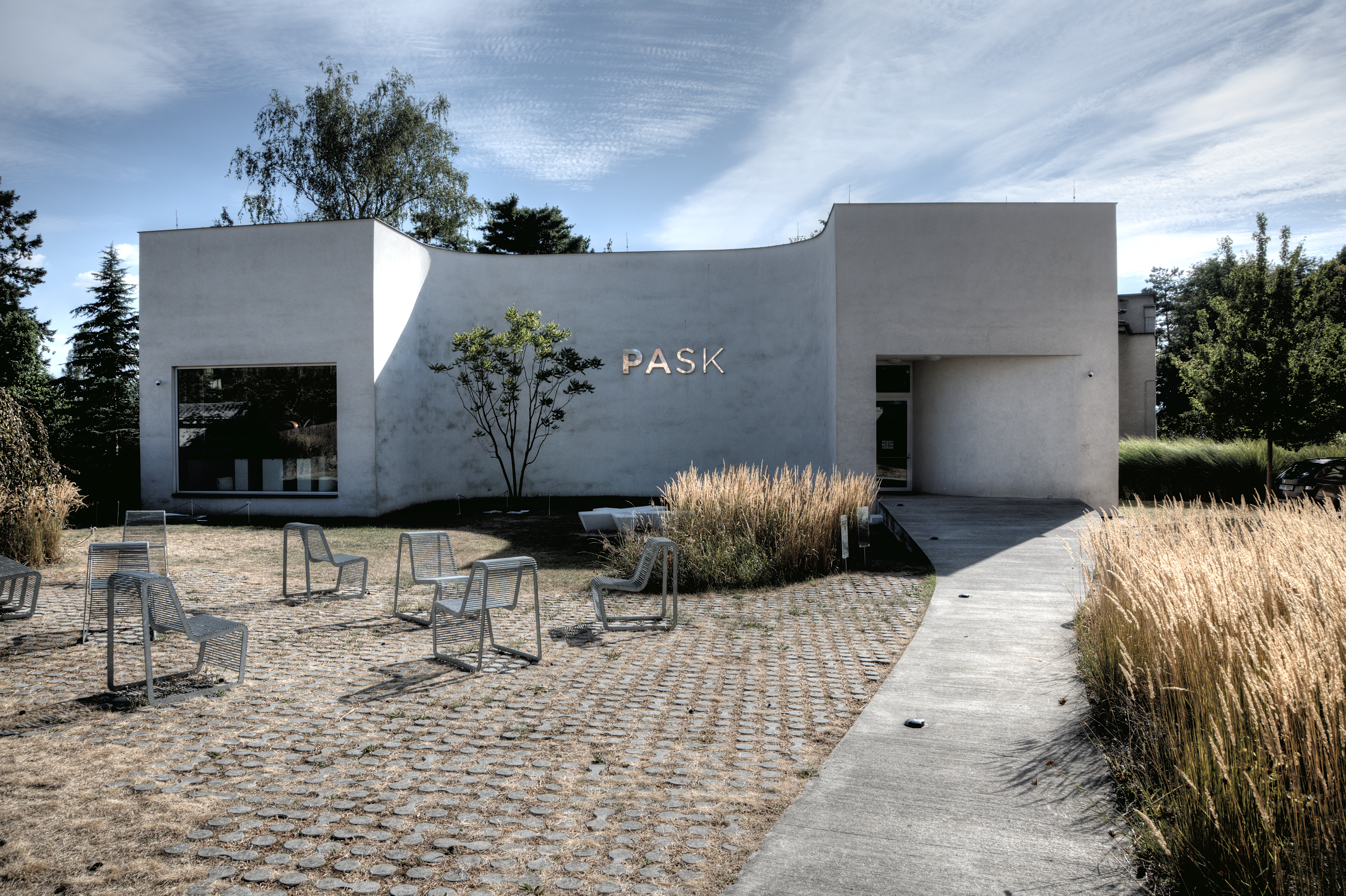
Pavilion of glass – PASK
