= Scholars of Piyyut =

Scholars of Jewish liturgical poetry

Piyyut is Jewish liturgical poetry, in Hebrew or occasionally Aramaic, composed from the fifth century CE through the end of the thirteenth century CE, and to some extent even well beyond then.

Since the 19th century, academic scholars have studied piyyut, using modern methods of history, philology, and other types of analysis. This page is a list of such scholars.

- Leopold Zunz (1794–1886)
- Samuel David Luzzatto, known as Shadal, the acronym of his initials (1800–1865)
- Ḥayyim Brody (1868–1942)
- Daniel Goldschmidt (1895–1972)
- Menahem Zulay (1901–1954)
- Hayyim Schirmann (1904–1981)
- Zvi Meir Rabinovitz (1908–1991)
- Aharon Mirsky (1914–2001)
- Joseph Marcus
- Yisrael Levin (born 1924)
- Ezra Fleischer (1928–2006)
- Jonah Fraenkel (1928–2012)
- Menahem Schmelzer (born 1934)
- Joseph Yahalom (born 1941)
- Yosef Tobi (born 1942)
- Ephraim Hazan (born 1943)
- Tova Rosen
- Binyamin Bar-Tikva
- Shulamit Elizur (born 1955)
- Tova Beeri
- Avraham Fraenkel (born 1959)
- Elisabeth Hollender
- Wout van Bekkum (born 1954)
- Naoya Katsumata
- Sarah Cohen
- Menahem Schmelzer (1934-2022)
