= Shalom Spiegel =

Professor of Medieval Jewish History

Shalom Spiegel (26 January 1899 – 24 May 1984) was the William Prager Professor of Medieval Hebrew Literature at the Jewish Theological Seminary of America from 1944 until his retirement in 1973. He is considered one of the greatest scholars of Judaica of his generation and a leading expert in medieval Hebrew literature.

Dr. Spiegel wrote about Jewish legends and the lives of the prophets. His books included "Hebrew Reborn," "Ezekiel or Pseudo-Ezekiel," "Noah, Daniel and Job" and "The Last Trial," a collection of legends about the sacrifice of Isaac.

== Biography ==
Dr. Spiegel was born in 1899 in the town of Bukovina, Romania to parents Regina and Simon Spiegel, a tobacco wholesaler. His brother was the film producer Sam Spiegel. He studied at the Israelitisch-Theologische Lehranstalt (Israelite Theological College) in Vienna and in 1922 received his doctorate from the University of Vienna. For several years he was a youth leader in Ha-Shomer ha-Ẓa'ir, a Zionist youth movement which prepared Jewish youth to live in collectives in Israel. He also taught in various schools in Israel from 1923–29. From 1929 to 1943, Spiegel taught Biblical and Post-Biblical Literature at the Jewish Institute of Religion in New York City, while also holding the position of librarian. After the death of Israel Davidson he joined the Jewish Theological Seminary of America as professor of medieval Hebrew literature in 1944.

His research concentrated on biblical and medieval Jewish literature, especially the prophets Hosea, Amos, Jeremiah, Ezekiel, and Job. He extensively researched liturgical poetry (piyyut in Hebrew) and devoted more than fifty years of research creating a definitive edition of the liturgical compositions of Eleazar Kallir. as well as the religious poetry of Kallir's predecessors and contemporaries. He collected material until his death, but never published it. In 1996 Menahem Schmelzer published a volume entitled Avot hapiyyut (The fathers of the piyyut) from the materials found in Spiegel's literary estate.

Spiegel was known for his thoroughness and eloquent writing style in both Hebrew and English.

His Hebrew Reborn of Jewish men of letters in modern times, is considered a lucid, cultural analysis of the works of the authors it surveys. He also gave attention to the biblical and the medieval periods of Jewish cultural history. The Last Trial, his study of the reworking of the story of the binding of Isaac (Akedah) in the Hebrew liturgy of the 12th and 13th centuries is a notable example of his penetrating approach.

Among the famous lectures he gave was one on the prophet Amos' view of Judaic tradition of justice in 1957. It was memorable since the audience included former President Harry S. Truman and Chief Justice Earl Warren. According to Spiegel Amos felt that justice was innate in humans and transcended other laws and considerations. He praised Chief Justice Warren as ''a worthy trustee'' of the ''precious cargo'' of human liberty. Largely due to Truman’s urging, the talk was published the following year as a small pamphlet entitled Amos versus Amaziah.

Spiegel served as chairman of the educational advisory committee to Hadassah, as secretary of the Alexander Kohut Memorial Foundation, and as a trustee of the Israel Matz Foundation. He was active in the Mekize Nirdamim Society, founded in 1862.

Spiegel was an avid writer and corresponded with the leading scholars and Jewish intellectuals of the day as well as with many of his former students and colleagues in Israel and New York City. Spiegel was also an acclaimed speaker and schools, synagogues, and congregations across the United States invited him to lecture at their institutions. Some correspondents of note include Alexander Marx, Gershom Scholem, Ben Zion Bokser, Moshe Davis, Louis Finkelstein, Louis Ginzberg, S.D. Goitein, Judah Goldin, Abraham Joshua Heshel, Saul Lieberman, Stephen S. Wise, Henrietta Szold, Israel Davidson, Mordecai M. Kaplan, E. E. Urbach, and Menahem Zulay.

== Awards and memberships ==
Dr. Spiegel received an honorary doctorate from JTS in 1973.

He was a fellow of the American Academy for Jewish Research

In 1983 he was elected to the American Academy of Arts and Sciences.

Spiegel was a member of the Society of Biblical Literature, the Oriental Society, and an honorary member of the Academy of the Hebrew Language.

== Archives ==
The Shalom Spiegel collection is located in an archive at JTS and consists of correspondence, handwritten notes, institutional records, copies of lectures, typescripts with notes, manuscripts. It is divided into six series and the following main subjects:

- Wise, Stephen Samuel (Person)
- Mekize Nirdamim Society (Organization)
- Goitein, Shelomo Dov (1900-1985) (Correspondent, Person)
- Bialik, Hayyim Nahman (Correspondent, Person)
- Marx, Alexander (Person)
- Baron, Salo Wittmayer (Correspondent, Person)
- Alexander Kohut Memorial Foundation (Organization)
- Truman, Harry S. (1884-1972) (Person)
- Scholem, Gershom (Person)
- Kohut, Alexander (Person)
- Agnon, Shmuel Yosef (Correspondent, Person)
- Finkelstein, Louis (1895-1991) (Person)
- Kaufmann, Yehezkel (Correspondent, Person)
- Jewish Theological Seminary of America. Board of Directors (Organization)
- Urbach, Efraim Elimelech (Correspondent, Person)
- Genizah (Organization)
- Zulay, Menahem (Person)
- Jewish Institute of Religion (New York, N.Y.) (Organization)
- Israel Matz Foundation (Organization)
- Kaplan, Mordecai Menahem, 1881-1983 (Person)
- Szold, Henrietta (1860-1945) (Person)
- Davidson, Israel (1870-1939) (Person)
- Lieberman, Saul (1898-1983) (Person)
- Eisenhower, Dwight D. (Dwight David) (1890-1969) (Person)
- Heschel, Abraham Joshua, 1907-1972 (Person)
- Goldin, Judah (Person)
- Bokser, Ben Zion (1907-1984) (Person)
- Davis, Moshe (Person)
- Ginzberg, Louis (1873-1953) (Person)
- Spiegel, Sam (Person)

== Shalom Spiegel Institute for Medieval Hebrew Literature ==
In 1996 JTS created the Shalom Spiegel Institute for Medieval Hebrew Literature, with an endowment funded by Dr. Spiegel's late brother, Sam Spiegel. The Institute provides fellowships to graduate students in the field, fosters international research projects, and provides access to Spiegel's research materials. Dr. Raymond Scheindlin, professor emeritus of medieval Hebrew literature at JTS, directed the Shalom Spiegel Institute of Medieval Hebrew Poetry.

Examples of the research programs are:

2018 The Shalom Spiegel Institute of Medieval Hebrew Literature Seminar in Medieval Hebrew poetry dedicated to the work of Immanuel of Rome.

2019 The Shalom Spiegel Institute Summer Seminar in Medieval Hebrew Poetry dedicated to the work of Abraham Ibn Ezra.

2023 Shalom Spiegel Institute Summer Seminar in Medieval Hebrew Poetry dedicated to the work of Shem Tov b. Joseph ibn Falaquera (ca. 1225-1295).

2024 The Shalom Spiegel Institute Summer Seminar in Medieval Hebrew Poetry dedicated to the work of Qalonymos b. Qalonymos (c. 14th century, Provence/Catalonia/Italian Peninsula)

== Selected works by Shalom Spiegel ==
The Last Trial: On the Legends and Lore of the Command to Abraham to Offer Isaac as a Sacrifice, the Akedah. New York : Schocken Books, 1967 162 pp

Hebrew Reborn: An Account of the Emergence, Revival, and Renascence of the Hebrew Language and Hebrew Letters in the Modern World. New York : Macmillan 1930 479 pp

Amos Vs. Amaziah Essays in Judaism No. 3. The Jewish Theological Seminary of America 1957

Noah, Daniel and Job: touching on Canaanite relics in the Legends of the Jews. Louis Ginzberg Jubilee Volumeon the Occasion of his Seventieth Birthday. New York: American Academy for Jewish Research, 1945

Ezekiel or Pseudo-Ezekiel? Reprinted from the Harvard Theological Review, vol 29, no 4, Oct. 1931

A prophetic attestation of the decalogue: Hosea 6:5; with some observations on Psalms 15 and 24 to Dr. Stephen Wise on his 60th birthday. Cambridge: Harvard University Press, 1934
