= VaYe'ehav Omen =

Hebrew piyyut

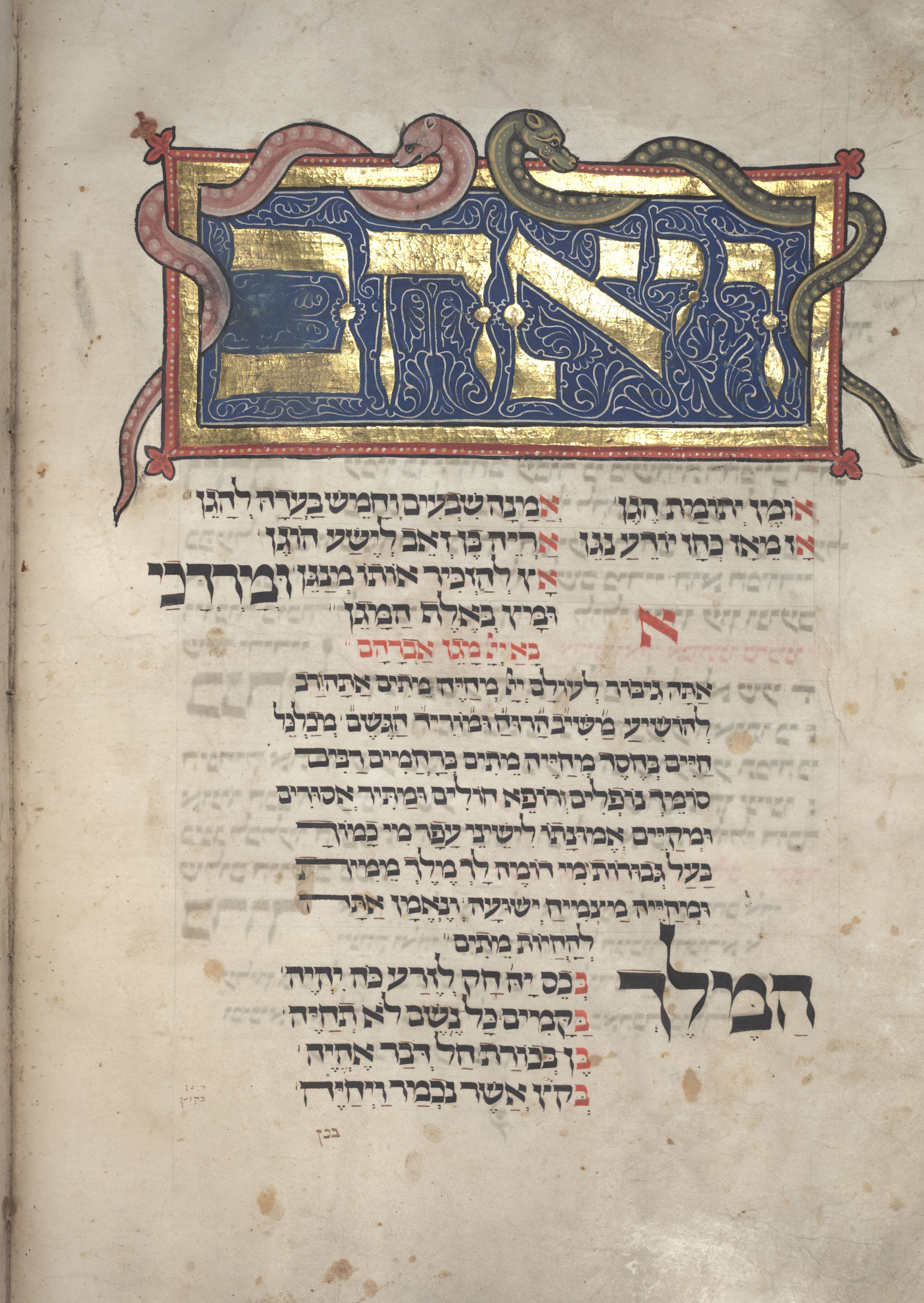
The beginning of VaYe'ehav Omen in the illuminated Leipzig Mahzor from the 14th century. The letters of the acrostics and the words forming biblical verses are emphasized, along with the concluding blessing of each Amidah benediction.

VaYe'ehav Omen in siddur Avodat Israel according to the Polish nusach (Rödelheim, 1901), edited and annotated by Seligman Baer.

VaYe'ehav Omen (Hebrew: וַיֶאֱהַב אוֹמֵן יְתוֹמַת הֶגֶן, romanized: Vayyeʾehav ʾŌmen Yěṯōmaṯ Heḡen, lit. 'And the stepfather [Mordecai] loved and raised the worthy orphan [Esther]') is a Hebrew piyyut recited during the repetition of the Amidah (known as a kerovah) on Purim, composed by Eleazar beRabbi Qallir the seventh century CE. The recitation of this piyyut was widespread during the period of the Cairo Genizah, in which many copies were discovered. The piyyut arrived in Europe and entered the Ashkenazi nusach, in which it was recited during Shacharit of Purim. Following the loss of prominence of piyyutim in the Ashkenazi rite, many communities no longer recite this piyyut. Nonetheless, it remains widely printed in siddurim.

The piyyut focuses primarily on the story of the Book of Esther, primarily based on Rabbinic midrash relating to the book. The language of the piyyut is characteristic of Qallir. Several words are used to allude to sections of the Book of Esther or midrash. His unique and innovative style includes shortening words (e.g. "הֶגֶן הנגזר" from "הגונה", or "חַל" from "חילל"), attaching pronominal letters to verbs (e.g. כְּחָז as a short form of "כאשר חזה"), and a preference to use literary epithets instead of proper names (e.g., referring to Mordecai as אוֹמֵן, "stepfather," based on Esther 2:7).

The poem rhymes and has a complex structure, containing an acrostic of the composer's full name (Hebrew: אלעזר בירבי קיליר חזק, lit. 'Elazar birebi Qallir, be strong!'), an alphabetical acrostic, and two entire verses from the Book of Esther, where a single word of each appears in each stanza in order. Each of the eighteen verses corresponds to one of the Eighteen Benedictions of the Amidah.

That no verse corresponds to the blessing "מצמיח קרן ישועה" in the Amidah is unsurprising, since this prayer was considered to be part of the Boneh Yerushalayim (Hebrew: בּוֹנֵה יְרוּשָׁלָיִם, lit. 'Builder of Jerusalem') prayer in Eretz Israel during the time of the composition of the piyyut. This fact was not always known historically, however, leading to various interpretations of the omission in later Ashkenazi rabbinic literature.

An expanded version of the piyyut was found in some copies of the piyyut found in the Cairo Genizah, which include additional verses in each stanza. These additional verses are written in a simpler style than the main verses, and therefore are probably not part of the original poem. The extra portions were likely added to the kerovah by the author in a later revision, resulting in two distinct versions. The two versions serve as a tool for researchers to analyze different styles of the author's work. In Birkat HaMinim, several long piyyutim were added to the kerovah, but their origins remain unknown.

== Historical background ==
The piyyut VaYe'ehav Omen was written in the Land of Israel, during the Byzantine period. The original purpose of the piyyut during this milieu was to diversify and expand on public prayer, and to offer the Hazzan poetic additions to the prosaic prayers. Special piyyutim were also written and added to prayer services on holidays and special religious events (for example, brit milah, fasts or wedding days). These poems typically include content related to these days.

The piyyutim intended for the repetition of the Amidah prayer are called "kerovot" (singular: kerovah). Since the Amidah prayer, on weekdays, consists of eighteen blessings, each with its own concluding signature verse, the structure of the kerovot designed for the Amidah prayers on weekdays includes eighteen sections, one for each blessing. In this way, the fixed wording of the first blessing (Blessing of the Fathers) was replaced with the first section of the piyyut, followed by the signature of the blessing "Blessed are You, O God, the Shield of Abraham." The second section is then said, instead of the fixed wording of the second blessing, followed by the signature of the blessing, and so on until the end of the prayer. This was done so that the sections of the prayer whose recitation was halakhically obligatory (mainly the signatures of the blessings of the Amidah concluding each verse) were left intact.

Special kerovot were also written for Purim, dealing with topics related to the holiday. Since Purim is halakhically defined as a weekday when the Amidah prayer is recited, the kerovot are of the 18-verse type. The remains of at least seven kerovot for Purim were discovered in the Cairo Genizah, but the kerovah VaYe'ehav Omen is the most well-known. Several copies of it were discovered in the Genizah (although the most common kerovah in the Genizah is actually a different one), but the kerovah before us received its fame from becoming a permanent part of the Purim prayer in the Ashkenazic nusach. As a result, it remains in the printed editions of the Purim prayer book and has been the subject of many commentaries.

== Language and rhyme ==
The language of the piyyut is a faithful representation of the enigmatic Qaliri style, known to characterize many of the works of Rabbi Elazar HaQalir. This kerovah is sometimes even cited as a preeminent example of this style. Shulamit Elizur lists several factors that characterize the style of the kerovah: the use of certain words to allude to entire sections of the Midrash or Megillah; its poetic language, which includes the innovation of verbs and nouns, the extensive use of abbreviated forms (examples: הֶגֶן derived from "הגונה", "נֶשֶׁם" as an abbreviation for "נשמה," and חַל instead of "חילל") and the affixing prepositional letters to verbs (for example, כְּחָז as an abbreviation for "כאשר חזה"); and the preference for the use of epithets to allude to characters, rather than using their names. All of these characteristics are expressed extensively in the kerovah (and in many Qaliri piyyutim). The use of epithets in the piyyut is very extensive in particular: Shalom Spiegel lists 75 epithets in the basic version, including ten different names for Mordechai (in the first two stanzas: Stepfather, Lion son of a Wolf, Myrrh).

The rhyme in the piyyut conforms to the strict rhyming rules of the classical piyut, called the "Qaliri rhyme" by Benjamin Harshav. These rules require in principle the identity of two of the root consonants between the rhyming words. In this rhyming scheme, similar consonants are permitted to rhyme with each other in some cases, mainly guttural consonants (אהח"ע).

== Poetic structure ==
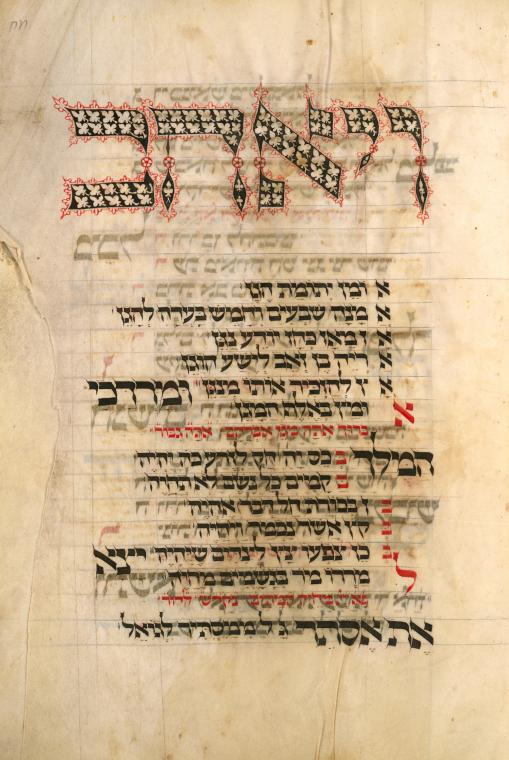
The beginning of VaYe'ehav Omen in an illuminated Mahzor from the 14th century (MS. New York 224). The piyyut was written in a way to emphasize the unique poetic structure.

The poem is notable for containing many intricate patterns within it. The first word of each stanza forms the verse Esther 2:17, and the first words of the sixth line of each stanza forms the verse Esther 8:15. The first letters of lines 2-5 and the first letters of the second words of the first lines each form an alphabetic acrostic, missing the letters צ-ת. The first letter of the second word on the sixth line (i.e., after the words forming Esther 8:15) acrostically spell the composer's name (Hebrew: אלעזר בירבי קיליר חזק, lit. 'Elazar birebi Qallir, be strong!').

=== Extended version ===
The manuscripts found in the Cairo Geniza contain many copies of the piyyut VaYe'ehav Omen, and in some of them it appears in an expanded version that includes additional verses that do not appear in the European versions. In the Geniza version, instead of one verse for each blessing of the Amidah, each blessing contains an additional four-line verse that is concatenated to the end of the main verse. The fourth line in each of the additional sections is a verse from the Bible that begins with the name of God, deals with the subject of the blessing, and then moves on to the conclusion of the prayer. The expanded version creates an additional signature of the name of the poet: אלעזר הודיה מקרית ספר, i.e. "Elazar Hodiya from Qiryat Sefer" known from other piyyutim.

The stylistic difference between the expanded verses and the main verses is striking. and they are characterized by simpler language. Although the expanded verses remain abstruse, they lack the complicated poetic forms that are found in the main verses and have a reduced reliance on the Midrash. The rules of rhyme are also less strict, and there is no strict requirement for two identical root consonants.

Shulamit Elizur has dealt with the relationship between the two versions of the kerovah, the short and the extended. She concludes that the short version, found in the European tradition and in some fragments from the Genizah, is the original version written by the poet. The evidence for this is mainly the significant stylistic differences that do not allow us to assume that the main and secondary verses were written together. In addition, the care taken to end the main verses with language that reflects the conclusion of the corresponding blessing of the Amidah indicates that the blessing's conclusion came immediately after it. She raises the possibility that the minor verses were written by a later poet, whose style differs from that of Qalir, but ultimately rejects this possibility. Poets are known to have written in more than one style, and even the Qalir one has several poetic styles. Additionally, the expanded verses are signed with his name in an acrostic. However, due to the simpler style of the expanded, Elizur speculates that they were written as a later expansion of the basic text, probably for recitation in a synagogue with a choir.

== Lack of verse corresponding to "Tzemakh David" ==
Each verse of the Piyyut VaYe'ehav Omen corresponds to one of the eighteen original benedictions of the Amidah, which were recited in Eretz Israel during the time of the composition. Consequently, there was no verse added for the Amidah prayer, Tzemakh David (Hebrew: צֶמַח דָּוִד, lit. 'sprout of David'; also known by its conclusion, Hebrew: מַצְמִיחַ קֶרֶן יְשׁוּעָה, romanized: maṣmiaḥ qeren yěšuāʿ, lit. 'Who causes the power of salvation to sprout') which was then considered to be part of the prayer Boneh Yerushalayim (Hebrew: בּוֹנֵה יְרוּשָׁלָיִם, lit. 'Builder of Jerusalem'). Indeed, Rabbi Isaiah di Trani wrote as much in his commentary on Tractate Ta'anit. Similar explanations were given by later commentaries of the Vilna Gaon, of Rabbi Moses Margolies, and of Rabbi Wolf Heidenheim. This explanation was confirmed explicitly by discoveries in the Cairo Geniza, where prayer books of the Eretz-Israel tradition were found with only eighteen benedictions.

In the Ashkenazi tradition, where the recitation of the kerovah has remained, many have understood the lack of a verse corresponding to Tzemakh David as a deliberate omission by the composer, and have tried to understand the reason. The Hasidic Rabbi Abraham Klausner wrote that the reason the poet did not create a verse for Tzemakh David was based on the fact that Mordecai was the son of Yair, son of Shimei ben Gera, the latter of whom was killed by David's command. Therefore, it would be inappropriate to include a verse for the prayer relating to David's kin. Similarly, many others, primarily adherents of the Hasidic movement, wrote that Mordechai was a descendant of King Saul, who fought against and lost his kingdom to David, and therefore it is not appropriate add a piyyut praising Mordecai onto a blessing intended for David. Others argue that since the conflict against Haman was part of the war against Amalek, and the main focus of this conflict involves Rachel's children and not the tribe of Judah, and therefore David does not relate to Mordechai's war with Haman.

On the other hand, some have written that the essence of Purim is the expectation and hope for God's salvation, and therefore in the blessing of Tzemakh David, which states, "For your salvation we have waited all day," there is no need to add any special addition to Purim, because it is essentially already connected to Purim. The anonymous commentator whose interpretation of the kerovah was printed in the Siddur Beit Yaakov (a 19th-century siddur based on the siddur of Rabbi Jacob Emden, with the addition of a lot of additional material) suggested that since the Qalir wanted to include the a word of the verses Esther 2:17, and Esther 8:15—each of which is 18 words long—in each stanza of the ppiyyut, he could not have written 19 stanzas.

== The piyyut in halakha and in minhag ==
Rabbi Natronai Gaon, in his responsum dealing with the question of saying piyyut during prayer, allows for the recitation of piyyutim if they maintain a connection with the subject of the blessing, but concludes his words: "But in kibbutz galuyot (Hebrew: קיבוץ גליות, lit. 'Ingathering of the exiles') and in uvhikkabetz betulot (Hebrew: ובהקבץ בתולות, lit. 'virgins were assembled', from Esther 2:19) and everything like them and anything similar to them is forbidden to recite, and if one says so we teach him so he will not say so." Various scholars have tried to identify which piyyutim were the subject of Rabbi Natronai's criticism. One of the widely accepted views is that the words of Rabbi Natronai are aimed at the relative "VaYe'ehav Omen". According to this hypothesis, "kibbutz galuyot" alludes to the end of the tenth verse, "נִדָּחִים מְקַבֵּץ" (at the end of the blessing of the ingathering of exiles), and "uvhikkabetz betulot" refers to the beginning of the next verse, which begins with הַבְּתוּלוֹת בְּהִקָּבֵץ שֵׁנִית ("when the virgins were assembled a second time"; Esther 2:19). If we accept this hypothesis, it is clear that Rabbi Natronai took issue with the kerovah, but it is unclear precisely what. One hypothesis holds that the criticism is not halachic, but instead takes issue with the linking of the ingathering of exiles with the ingathering of virgins for King Ahasuerus in the Book of Esther.

However, when Rabbi Gershom ben Judah (and other rabbis following him) quotes the responsum of Rabbi Natronai Gaon, the permission to say the piyyutim is quoted, but the sentence quoted above against kibbutz galuyot and uvhikkabetz betulot is absent. Marienberg-Milikowsky suggests that the omission may have been intentional since Rabbi Gershom did not want to directly oppose the position of Natronai.

=== The piyyut in Ashkenaz ===
The recitation of the piyyut VaYe'ehav Omen in Ashkenaz is well-established and widespread, and appears throughout the books of customs (minhag). The recitation of the piyyut on Purim is mentioned, for example, in the 13th century Seder of Troyes, the 13th century Book of Minhagim of Meir of Rothenburg, and in the writings of the Maharil and the Levush.

On the other hand, Rabbi Sa'adiah ben Natan Neta, a student of the Vilna Gaon, writes that the Gaon did not recite the piyyut, and as a consequence, numerous Ashkenazic communities today refrain from its recitation. Rabbi Yechiel Michel Tucazinsky notes that the custom of the perushim in Israel is not to say the kerovah, while the Hasidim recite it.

Evidence for the prominence of the piyyut VaYe'ehav Omen in the Ashkenazi rite is that it is still recited in communities that have largely rejected recitation of piyyutim throughout the year. For instance, the piyyut was recited in the Volozhin Yeshiva, the old Bet Midrash of Berlin, and today in the Beth Medrash Govoha. The Netziv justifies the recitation of the kerovah, even in communities in which piyyutim are rarely recited, on the basis of it expounding upon the miracles of Purim.

The musical tradition for reciting the kerovah on Purim is outlined by Sholom Kalib.

== Bibliography ==
- Eppenstein, Simon (1913). Beiträge zur Geschichte und Literatur im geonäischen Zeitalter (in German). Berlin: Verlag von Louis Lamm. p. 57.
