= Mekitze Nirdamim =

Israeli literary society

Mekitze Nirdamim Society
- חֶבְרַת מְקִיצֵי נִרְדָּמִים
- Formation: September 12, 1861; 165 years ago
- Founder: Eliezer L. Silbermann; Rabbi Nathan M. Adler; Michael Sachs; Samuel David Luzzatto
- Founded at: Lyck, Kingdom of Prussia
- Headquarters: Jerusalem, Israel (since 1934)
- Official language: Hebrew

Mekitze Nirdamim (Hebrew: מְקִיצֵי נִרְדָּמִים, Meḳitse nirdamim, lit. "Rousers of Those Who Slumber") is a literary society dedicated to the retrieval, preservation, and publication of medieval Hebrew texts. It was first established at Lyck, Prussia in 1861, and is now based out of Jerusalem, Israel.

== History ==
Mekitze Nirdamim was first established in Lyck, Prussia in 1861, mainly by the efforts of Eliezer L. Silbermann, editor of the Hebrew weekly Ha-Magid. The Society's first board consisted of prominent scholars and philanthropists such as Rabbi Nathan Marcus Adler, Albert Cohn, S. D. Luzzatto, Moses Montefiore, Michael Sachs, Mattityahu Strashun, and Joseph Zedner.

The organization's focus on realigning Haskalah and tradition among European Jews was met with opposition from some maskilim. By 1864, nonethelessss, the number of subscribers stood at 1,200. Among its early publications were Luzzatto's 1864 edition of Judah Halevi's Diwan, Salomon Buber's edition of the Pesikta de-Rav Kahana (1868), and parts of Isaac Lampronti's rabbinic encyclopedia Paḥad Yizhak (1864–74).

The Society became increasingly inactive during the 1870s. After Silbermann's death in 1882, Mekitze Nirdamim was successfully revived at Berlin in 1885 by Abraham Berliner, alongside Moses Levi Ehrenreich, Joseph Derenbourg, David Günzburg, Solomon Joachim Halberstam, Abraham Harkavy, Marcus Jastrow, David Kaufmann, and Mattityahu Strashun. Amid the rise of Nazism in Germany, the Society was moved to Jerusalem in 1934, under the leadership of then-president Aron Freimann. Agnon served as president of the Society from 1954 to 1970, and was succeeded by Gershom Scholem.

== Notable members ==
- Rabbi Nathan Marcus Adler
- S. Y. Agnon
- Shmuel Ashkenazi
- Yitzhak Baer
- Meir Benayahu
- Abraham Berliner
- Albert Cohn
- Joseph Derenbourg
- Moses Levi Ehrenreich
- Shulamit Elizur
- Simcha Emanuel
- Abraham Firkovich
- Ezra Fleischer
- Mordechai Akiva Friedman
- Aron Freimann
- Shelomo Dov Goitein
- David Günzburg
- Solomon Joachim Halberstam
- Abraham Harkavy
- Marcus Jastrow
- Zadoc Kahn
- David Kaufmann
- Louis Loewe
- Samuel David Luzzatto
- Sir Moses Montefiore
- Samuel Poznański
- Michael Sachs
- Hayyim Schirmann
- Gershom Scholem
- Eliezer L. Silbermann
- David Simonsen
- Mattityahu Strashun
- Samuel Strashun
- Israel Ta-Shma
- Ephraim Urbach
- David Yellin
- Joseph Zedner
- Jacob Berlinger
