= Jose ben Jose =

Early payyetan who lived in Israel in the 4th to 5th century

Jose ben Jose (Hebrew: יוסי בן יוסי) was an early payyetan who lived in the land of Israel in the 4th to 5th century CE.

In some sources he is called "Jose ben Jose the orphan", on the assumption that only an orphan would receive the same name as his father; however, this assumption is not accurate in relation to all communities at the time. Alternatively, "orphan" was a title of honor, given due to his being "alone" in his skills and accomplishments. According to one tradition, he was a kohen and was given the title of Kohen Gadol.

His poetry was rich, but written in relatively simple language. His poems have been compared to those of Yannai and Kalir, but do not have rhyme schemes and do not allude to midrash, though they do have standard meter.

Most of his poetry has been lost, but some is preserved in the contemporary Ashkenazic prayer books. Although he was from an era before poets would sign their piyyutim, the Teqiatoth (piyyutim of the special blessings of Mussaf on Rosh Hashanah) of the second day Rosh Hashanah, as well as some of the Selichot of the night of Yom Kippur are attributed to him in early Ashkenazic manuscripts. Despite this attribution, Shulamit Elizur claims that Selichot are Babylonian in origin, and if so, Jose ben Jose would not have written Selichot.

== Additional reading ==
- Aaron Mirsky (Editor), Piyute Yose ben Yose, Mosad Biali, Jerusalem 1977 (Hebrew).
