= Israel Ta-Shma =

Israeli scholar of rabbinic literature (1936–2004)

Professor Israel Ta-Shma
- ישראל תשמע
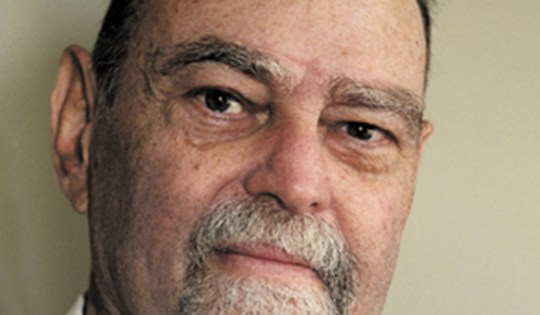
- Born: 1936; Tel Aviv, Mandatory Palestine
- Died: 4 October 2004 (aged 67–68); Jerusalem
- Occupation: Professor of Talmud
- Known for: Study of medieval Jewish culture
- Spouse: Devorah Flint
- Awards: Bialik Prize, EMET Prize, Israel Prize

Academic background
- Education: Bar Ilan University (PhD)
- Thesis: (1973)

Academic work
- Discipline: Talmud and rabbinic literature
- Institutions: Hebrew University of Jerusalem

Israel Moshe Ta-Shma (Hebrew: ישראל תשמע; 1936 – 4 October 2004) was an Israeli scholar of Talmud who served as a professor at Hebrew University of Jerusalem. He was a leader in research on Jewish manuscripts and books, while publishing important histories of rabbinic culture in pre-modern Europe. He examined how the Talmud was interpreted, especially by the Tosafists, and compared Jewish to Christian medieval thinkers. Ta-Shma received significant recognition during his lifetime, including the Israel Prize in 2003.

== Early life ==
Ta-Shma went to high school at Yeshivat haYishuv heḤadash in Tel Aviv and then studied at Hebron Yeshiva, Jerusalem. He was thought to be an illui, a Talmud prodigy, and won a prize in May 1956 and the Yaakov Herzog prize in 1964. He received semikhah as a rabbi in 1957 from Yitzhak HaLevi Herzog, then Chief Rabbi of Israel. He served in the Israel Defense Forces (IDF), 1957–1959.

He grew up in a religious Zionist home. The family name was adopted by his father after the Talmudic phrase, ta-shma (lit. come and learn), an Aramaic term that introduces an earlier text in order to advance an argument.

== Academic career ==
In 1960, Ta-Shma became a deputy editor of the Encyclopaedia Hebraica, working under Yeshayahu Leibowitz. That year he also started undergraduate studies at Hebrew University in Jerusalem, earned his M.A. in Talmud there in 1969, and completed his Ph.D at Bar Ilan University in 1973. He taught on Bar Ilan's Talmud faculty for two years before joining the Talmud faculty at Hebrew University.

Ta-Shma moved to Jerusalem in 1981 to run the Institute of Microfilmed Manuscripts at the National Library of Israel and continued there for 18 years. In 1975, Ta-Shma started a journal for the academic study of the Hebrew book, Alei Sefer (lit. leaves of book), now published by Bar Ilan University Press. He was also on the editorial board of the journal Tarbiz.

He pioneered the use of manuscripts in Jewish studies and served as the academic secretary of Mekiẓe Nirdamim (lit. "Rousers of Those Who Slumber"), an organization that supports scholarship on Hebrew medieval documents. Though best known for his books and over 150 academic articles, David Derovan noted that Ta-Shma's first publication was a collection of Jewish songs, issued by the Chief Rabbinate of the IDF for its soldiers (1960).

According to Yehudah Mirsky, "Perhaps his most arresting conclusion was that much of the early religious life of the Jews of Italy, France, and Germany developed independently of the Babylonian Talmud and its accumulating layers of commentary." From this standpoint, Rashi and his lineage of commentators, the Tosafists, were moving against the grain of their European medieval culture. Ta-Shma also argued that the particular method of Tosafists in Evreux, which paid less attention to Talmudic digressions, was due to the influence of Ashkenazi Hasidim.

Ta-Shma found similarities between medieval Jewish and Christian scholars, such as Abelard and Rabbenu Tam, in the 12th century but the resemblances dissipated by the 13th.

Ta-Shma also differentiated between two poles in medieval Jewish thought: on the one hand, the Babylonian Talmud and its Geonic and Sephardi interpreters, geared to legal codification, and, on the other hand, the Palestinian Talmud and the greater diversity Ashkenazi interpretations. He argued that medieval Germany received its Jewish learning, grounded in Palestinian Talmudic discourse, through the Byzantine Empire's center in Constantinople and Greece, with Rabbi Isaiah di Trani in Italy as a key conduit in both directions.

Beside these Jewish religious centers, Ta-Shma also explored the periphery of the Jewish diaspora in medieval Poland, Russia, and Syria.

== Awards ==
In 2002, Ta-Shma received the Bialik Prize for Jewish Thought from the city of Tel Aviv.

That same year, Ta-Shma received the EMET Prize for "For his contribution to the raising of Talmudic and Rabbinic literature research to new scientific heights." For his scholarship on rabbinic literature in the medieval period, the EMET biography states that his "research has built up a new and autonomous field of research belonging to the history of Jewish intellectual writings in the Middle Ages."

In 2003, he was awarded the Israel Prize, with the jury stating: "His uniqueness and greatness lie in his ability to blend research in halakha, culture and literature into an enriching and profound experience." They recognized his prolific writing and multidisciplinary research. The judges were Noah Aminoah (Tel Aviv University), Talmud scholar Yonah Frankel (Hebrew University) and Joseph Tabori of Bar-Ilan University.

== Personal life ==
Ta-Shma married (דבורה פלינט, Deborah Flint) and had five children.

He worked out of a separate apartment that was said to be filled to the brim with books and manuscripts.

== Works ==
- Ta-Shma, I. M. (1967). Sifre rishonim : sifre halakhah mi-bet midrasham shel ha-rishonim she-raʾu or la-rishonah ba-shanim 719-727 : reshimah bibliyografit. ha-Sifriyah she-ʻal yad ha-Yeshivah ha-merkazit le-Yiśraʾel, "Merkaz ha-Rav."
- Ta-Shma, I. M., & Posner, Rachel. (1975). The Hebrew book : an historical survey. Keter Pub. House Jerusalem.
- Ta-Shma, I. M. (1991). Minhag Ashkenaz ha-ḳadmon : ḥeḳer ṿe-ʻiyun. Hotsaʾat sefarim ʻa. sh. Y.L. Magnes, ha-Universiṭah ha-ʻIvrit.
- Ta-Shma, I. M. (1993). Rabbi Zerachiah ha-Levi of Gironai, the author of Ha-Meor [ba'al ha-Me'or]. Mossad Rav Kook.
- Ta-Shma, I. M. (1993). The open book in Medieval Hebrew literature: the problem of authorized editions. Bulletin of the John Rylands Library (2014), 75(3), 17–24. https://doi.org/10.7227/BJRL.75.3.2
- Ta-Shma, I. M. (1996). Halakhah, minhag u-metsiʾut be-Ashkenaz. Ritual, Custom and Reality in Franco-Germany 1000-1350. Hebrew University Magnes.
- Lifshitz, B., Shochetman, E., Ta-Shma, I. M., & Universiṭah ha-ʻIvrit bi-Yerushalayim. Makhon le-ḥeḳer ha-mishpaṭ ha-ʻIvri. (1997). Mafteaḥ ha-sheʾelot ṿeha-teshuvot shel ḥakhme Ashkenaz, Tsarfat ṿe-Iṭalyah. Makhon le-ḥeḳer ha-mishpaṭ ha-ʻIvri.
- Idel, Moshe, Mortimer Ostow, Ivan G. Marcus, Paul B. Fenton, and Israel M. Ta-Shma, eds. Jewish mystical leaders and leadership in the 13th century. Jason Aronson, Incorporated, 1998.
- Ta-Shma, I. M. (1999). הספרות הפרשנית לתלמוד באירופה ובצפון אפריקה: חלק ראשון: 1200-1000. Talmudic Commentary in Europe and North Africa,. Published in two parts, 1000-1200, 1200-1400. Magnes Press
- Ta-Shma, I. M. (2001). Rabi Mosheh ha-Darshan ṿeha-sifrut ha-ḥitsonit. Ṭuro Ḳoleg', ha-sheluḥah be-Yiśra'el, ha-Tokhnit le-toʼar sheni be-limude Yahadut.
- Ta-Shma, I. M. (2001). ha-Nigleh sheba-nistar : le-ḥeḳer sheḳiʻe ha-Halakhah be-sefer ha-Zohar ([Mahad. murḥevet, metuḳenet u-mushlemet].). Ha-Ḳibuts ha-meʼuḥad.
- Ta-Shma, I. M. (2003). ha-Tefilah ha-Ashkenazit ha-ḳedumah : peraḳim be-ofyah uve-toldoteha. Hotsaʾat sefarim ʻa. sh. Y.L. Magnes, ha-Universiṭah ha-ʻIvrit.
- Ta-Shma, I. M., & Hovav, Y. (2004). Keneset meḥḳarim : ʻiyunim ba-sifrut ha-rabanit bi-Yeme ha-Benayim. Mosad Byaliḳ.
- Ta-Shma, I. M. (2006). Creativity and tradition : studies in medieval rabbinic scholarship, literature and thought. Harvard University Center for Jewish Studies: Distributed by Harvard University Press.
- Roth, P. "Professor Israel Moshe Ta-Shma – Bibliography." in Ta Shma: Studies in Judaica in Memory of Israel M. Ta-Shma. ed. / P. Roth. Tevunot, 2011. p. 889-910.
