= Ehrenreich =

German language surname

Ehrenreich (German for "rich in honour") is a surname that was adopted by diverse families in Germany when surnames became legally required. Most people with this name are of Jewish heritage, but there are also people of this name with Catholic heritage. Notable people with the surname include:

- Alden Ehrenreich (born 1989), American actor
- Alfred Ehrenreich (1882–1931), American ichthyologist
- Barbara Ehrenreich (1941–2022), American writer and columnist
- Ben Ehrenreich (born 1972), American freelance journalist and novelist, son of Barbara
- Henry Ehrenreich (1928–2008), American physicist and professor
- John Ehrenreich (born 1943), American psychologist
- Martin Ehrenreich (born 1983), Austrian football defender
- Moses Levi Ehrenreich (1818–1899), Polish-Italian rabbi
- Ron Ehrenreich (born 1950), American credit union officer and teacher
