= Moses Reicherson =

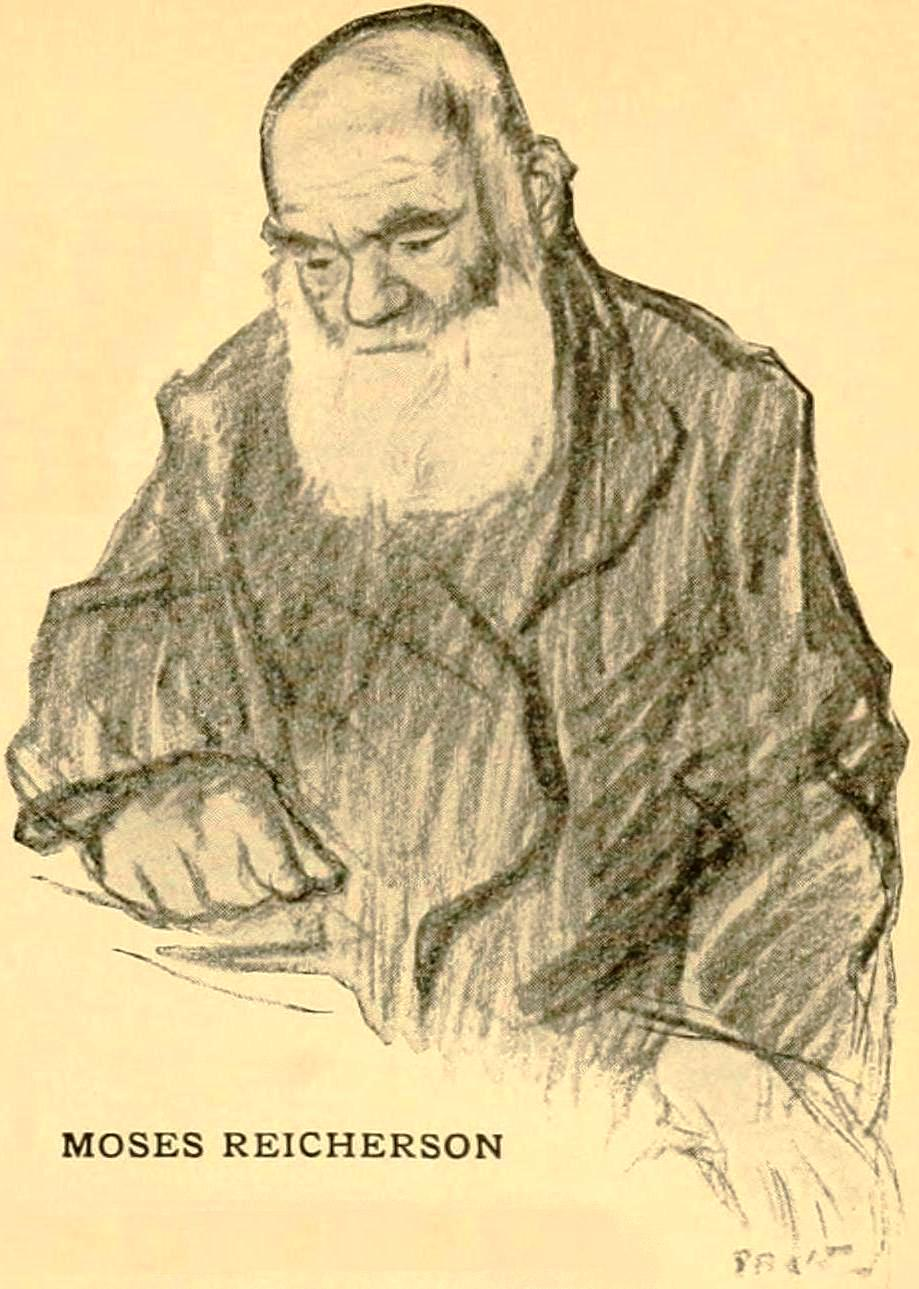
- Portrait of Reicherson by Jacob Epstein
- Born: 5 October 1827; Vilnius, Vilna Governorate, Russian Empire
- Died: 3 April 1903 (aged 75); New York, New York, United States
- Writing career
- Language: Hebrew

Moses Reicherson (Hebrew: משה בן־דוד הכהן רייכערסאָהן, romanized: Moshe ben-David ha-Kohen Reikhersohn; 5 October 1827 – 3 April 1903) was Hebrew grammarian, translator, biblical commentator, and poet.

== Selected biography ==
Reicherson was born in 1827 in Vilnius, where he was a childhood friend of J. L. Gordon.

After studying Talmud, Hebrew, and European languages, he became a Hebrew teacher and a proofreader and editor for publishing houses. In 1890 or 1892 he emigrated to New York to be near his son, where he lived in poverty. He worked as a melamed at the Uptown Talmud Torah in Harlem, becoming its principal by 1901.

Reicherson died in New York in 1903.

== Work ==
The literary activity of Reicherson was chiefly in the field of Hebrew grammar. He wrote: Ḥelkat ha-nikkud, on Hebrew punctuation (Vilna, 1864); Ḥelkat ha-pe'alim veha-milot, on Hebrew verbs and particles (Vilna, 1873); Yad la-nikkud, a compendium of the rules of Hebrew punctuation for beginners (appended to the prayer book Ḥinnuk tefillah; Vilna, 1880); Dikduk ḥaberim, on the elementary rules of Hebrew grammar (appended to the same prayer book; Vilna, 1883); Ma'arekhet ha-dikduk, a compendium of Hebrew grammar (Vilna, 1883; it was translated into Yiddish by its author and published in the same year); Ḥelkat ha-shem, on the Hebrew noun (Vilna, 1884); Tikkun meshalim, a translation of the fables of the Russian writer I. A. Krylov (Vilna, 1860); and Mishle Lessing ve-sippurav, a translation of Lessing's fables (New York, 1902).

Along with essays on linguistics in American and European Hebrew journals like Ner ma'aravi, Ha-pisgah, Ha-Ivri, and Ha-teḥiya, Reicherson published poetry in Joshua Mezaḥ's literary magazine Gan peraḥim.

He also wrote He'arot we-tikkunim la-divan, notes on the diwan of Judah ha-Levi (Lyck, 1866). He left a number of works in manuscript, including: Dibre ḥakamim ve-ḥidotam, on Talmudic aggadot; commentaries on the Pentateuch, on the Books of Samuel, Kings, Isaiah, Ezekiel, the Twelve Prophets, Psalms, Job, and Proverbs; a prayer book, Tefillah le-Moshe; a work on Hebrew syntax; and fables, original as well as translations from Gellert.

== Bibliography ==
- Ḥelkat ha-nikkud. Vilna: Defus Shmuel Yosef Fin ve-Avraham Tzvi Rozenkrantz. 1864. hdl:2027/uc1.$b406542.
- Judah ha-Levi (1866). He'arot ve-Tikkunim la-Divan. Lyck: Mekitze Nirdamim.
- Ḥelkat ha-pe'alim veha-milot. Vilna: Defus H. Dvorzetz. 1873.
- Yad la-nikkud. Vilna. 1880.
- Dikduk ḥaberim. Vilna. 1883.
- Ma'arekhet ha-dikduk. Vilna: Defus ve-hotsa'ot ha-almanah veha-aḥim Romm. 1883. hdl:2027/hvd.hwmkly.
- Ḥelkat ha-shem; o, yad va-shem. Vilna: Defus Rozenkrantz ve-Shriftzetzer. 1884.
- Krylov, Ivan (1892) [1860]. Tikkun meshalim. Basni I.A. Krylova. Vilna: Defus Avraham Tzvi Rozenkrantz ve-Menaḥem Mendil Shriftzetzer. hdl:2027/hvd.hwn6q5.
- Lessing, Gotthold Ephraim (1902). Mishle Lessing ve-sippurav. New York.
- Giller, Pinḥas, ed. (2015) [1895]. Be'ur Moshe: be'urim al ḥamishah ḥumshe Torah. New York: Fryd.
