= Goldschmidt-Fraenkel Machzor =

Goldschmidt-Fraenkel Machzor, formally known as Machzor According to the Customs of the Ashkenazim in All Their Branches: Including the Western Ashkenazic Rite, Polish Rite and former French Rite is a critical edition of the piyyutim (liturgical poems) found in the Ashkenazic and French prayer books. Daniel Goldschmidt initiated this project, and after his death his son-in-law Yonah Fraenkel continued it. This project includes collecting manuscript versions of the piyyutim used in the aforementioned customs, including those piyyutim recited today, as well as those piyyutim recited in the past which did not make it to the age of printing. The machzor includes a commentary to all the piyyutim.

== Editing and publishing ==
Goldschmidt published the Rosh Hashanah and Yom Kippur volumes in 1970 under the title "Machzor for the High Holidays". He died in 1972, while working on "Machzor for Sukkot, Shemini Atzeret and Simchat Torah." The machzor was eventually published by his son-in-law, Professor Yonah Fraenkel, in 1981. Professor Fraenkel continued the project, publishing the Passover machzor (1993) and Shavuot machzor (2000). This completed the work on the Ashkenazic machzor for the major holidays.

As a continuation of the holiday machzor project, Fraenkel began working on a machzor for the Sabbaths of circumcision and marriage, but died in 2012 before completing the work. The family turned to Dr. Gabriel Wasserman to finish the work on the machzor for the Sabbaths of circumcision and marriage, and it was published in 2025.

== Content and importance of the Machzor ==
In addition to the piyyutim, the machzor also includes the standard prayers, without a full critical edition or commentary (although sometimes includes variant texts). This is so that it should not be just an academic book but can also be used by the public for prayer.

The machzorim are considered in piyyut research to be the most important critical edition of the Ashkenazic machzor. Part of the importance stems from the fact that before the publication of the machzor, most French piyyutim were unpublished and unknown to many, because the French rite was never printed as an independent siddur or machzor.

Shulamit Elizur, in her review of the Passover machzor (which touches on the earlier volumes as well) writes about the indispensability of these volumes for piyyut study, despite having several critiques on how the editor could have done things better.
