= Jewish Theological Seminary Library =

Library of the New York seminary

Coordinates: 40.81170°N 73.95971°W

The Jewish Theological Seminary Library is one of the largest Jewish libraries in the world. Founded in 1893, it is located at the Jewish Theological Seminary of America in New York City, New York, and holds over 400,000 volumes, as well as extensive rare materials collections, including the world's largest collection of Hebrew manuscripts. Its holdings have been described as "the most impressive compilation of Jewish historical materials outside of Jerusalem." The library is an affiliate of the Columbia University Libraries.

== History ==
The library of the Jewish Theological Seminary was founded in 1893 through donations from private individuals including Cyrus Adler, Mortimer L. Schiff, Felix M. Warburg, Louis Marshall, Mayer Sulzberger, and Elkan Nathan Adler. The Jewish Museum was founded at the library in 1904 through a gift from Sulzberger of over 400 pieces of Jewish ceremonial art, and it would stay at the seminary for more than four decades. Alexander Marx served as its librarian from 1903 to 1953. On his arrival the library contained 5,000 and three manuscripts; under his direction it would grow into one of the most significant collections of Judaica in North America, coming to hold 165,000 books and over 9,000 Hebrew, Samaritan, Aramaic, and Yiddish manuscripts by the time of his death.

On April 18, 1966, the library caught fire, destroying some 70,000 volumes, including forty Torahs. The library's rare books and manuscripts collection was kept in a separate area and so was unharmed. The library was moved to a temporary location and reopened in September of that year, and would stay there until a new building for the library was completed in 1983.

The library was once named the Ivan F. and Seema Boesky Family Library, after stockbroker Ivan Boesky, who had attended classes at the Jewish Theological Seminary and been a major donor to the institution. Following his indictment for insider trading in 1986, his name was stripped from the library at his request.

The library's practice of deaccessioning duplicate items and rare items that are not deemed as necessary for the Jewish Theological Seminary's "core mission"—e.g., Latin incunabula—has garnered controversy. One of its rarer possessions—a pinkas, or journal, which belonged to a rabbi from Tiberias who had toured Europe around the early 19th century—was discovered at an auction in 2021, raising concerns around the "lack of transparency around the sale of the manuscript" among Judaica librarians and consultants. The library as of 2026 has sold numerous rare manuscripts in private hidden sales without providing any details of what has been sold. The items sold include invaluable autograph manuscript codices by the kabbalists Elazar Azikri, author of the famous hymn Yedid Nefesh, and Jacob Tsemah; the great Talmudist Solomon Luria; the Hasidic rebbe Hayim ben Solomon Tyrer of Czernowitz; and major rabbinic figures such as Yair Bacharach, Joseph Colon, and Josiah Pinto; and the letter collection of Moses Hayim Luzzatto.

== Collection ==
The Jewish Theological Seminary Library holds over 11,000 Hebrew manuscripts, making it the largest such collection in the world. Additionally, it has 43,000 fragments from the Cairo Geniza, over 500 ketubahs, and 4,000 rare and significant broadsides published from the 16th to 20th centuries.
