= Eleazar beRabbi Qallir =

Byzantine Jewish poet

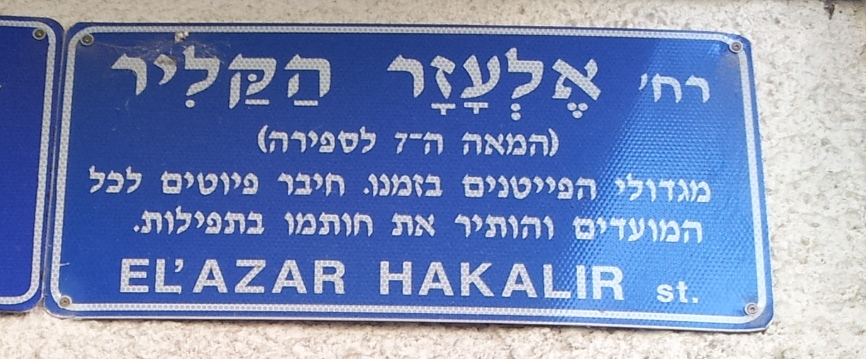
Street named after Qallir in Tel Aviv.

Eleazar beRabbi Qallir (Hebrew: אלעזר בירבי קליר, romanized: ʾElʿāzār beRibbi Qallir; c. 570 – c. 640), also known as Eleazar HaKalir, (Note: Other variants of his name include Eleazar ben Qillir, Kalir, and ha-Kaliri.) was a Byzantine Jewish poet whose Hebrew-language liturgical verses or piyyuṭim are sung during significant religious services, especially in the Nusach Ashkenaz rite, as well as in the Italian Nusach and well as the Romaniote rite. In particular, he wrote hymns for the Three Pilgrimage Festivals, for special Shabbats, for weekdays of festive character, and the fast days.

== Biography ==
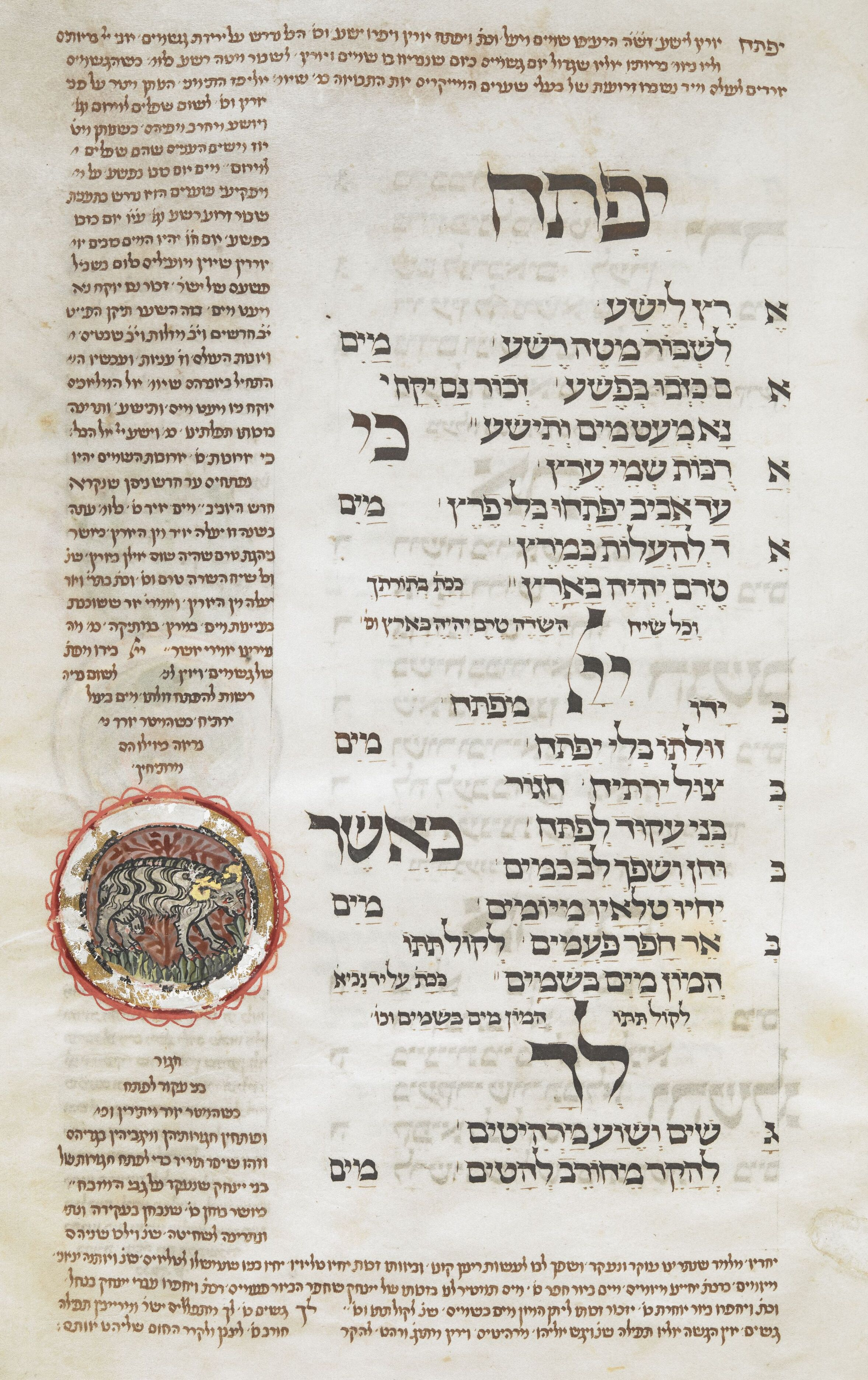
Tripartite Mahzor, ca. 1322, British Library, piyyut יפתח ארץ לישע by Qallir. The mahzor emphasizes some of the poetic patterns, such as the fourfold alphabetical acrostic, the incipits which form Deuteronomy 28:12 and Isaiah 55:10, and the word מים ending every first and third verse.

Although his poems have had a prominent place in printed ritual and he is known to have lived somewhere in the Near East, documentation regarding details of his life has been lost to history, including the exact year and circumstances of his birth and death. He is said to have been the disciple of another 6th-century composer of piyyuṭim, Yannai, who, according to a certain legend, grew jealous of Eleazar's superior knowledge and caused his death by inserting into his shoe a scorpion whose sting proved to be fatal.

Samuel David Luzzatto, however, dismisses this legend because Yannai's piyyuṭim are still recited. Luzzatto argues that if Yannai was a murderer then there is no way Yannai's piyyuṭim would be so popular. Additionally, argues Luzzatto, Gershom ben Judah mentions Yannai and uses honorifics, something Gershom would not have done if the legend were true.

In the acrostics of his hymns he usually signs his father's name, Qallir, but three times he writes Qillir. In some of them, he adds the name of his city, Kirjath Sepher. Eleazar's name, home, and time have been the subject of many discussions in modern Jewish literature. Italy, Lower Mesopotamia, and Palestine have been claimed by different scholars as his native land. Some legends concerning his career have been handed down.

Nathan ben Jehiel derives the name "Qallir" from Koine Greek: κόλλυρα, romanized: a small cake, and reports that the poet obtained his name from a cake inscribed with Biblical verses that was given him to eat as a talisman for wisdom when he began to go to school. His scholarship having been attributed later to that talisman, he was called "Eleazar the Cake." While such a custom is known to have existed among Jews and Syriac Christians, others claim that the explanation put forward by ben Jehiel is not acceptable since Qallir is not the name of the poet but that of his father.

Another interpretation holds that the name was derived from the poet's or his father's hometown: the Italian city Cagliari, Calais, Cologne, Callirrhoë in the Transjordan, or Edessa in Syria (F. Perles). Others see in it the Latin name Celer (Joseph Derenbourg). Kirjath Sepher has been identified with the biblical place in Judea of the same name (Wolf Heidenheim), with Sippar on the Euphrates (Filosseno Luzzatto), and with Cagliari (Civitas Portus), in Italy.

The theory that he lived in Italy is based upon the premise that he wrote double qerovoth (קרובא, special piyyuṭim) for Jewish holidays; although Tosafot and Asher ben Jehiel assert that he did not write any for the extra festival days celebrated in the Diaspora.

His time has been set at different dates, from the second century, to the tenth or eleventh century. Based on Saadia Gaon's Sefer ha-galuy, some place him in the 6th century. Older authorities consider him to have been a teacher of the Mishnah and identify him either with Eleazar ben Arach or with Eleazar ben Simeon He has been confounded with another poet named Eleazar ben Jacob, and a book by the title of Kevod Adonai was ascribed to him by Moses Botarel.

The earliest references to Qallir seem to be in a responsum of Natronai ben Hilai (c. 853), in the Sefer Yetzirah commentary of Saadia Gaon, and in his "Agron", as well as in the writings of Jacob Qirqisani.

Modern research points to the probability that he and his teacher were Palestinian Jews. Since Yannai is known to have been one of the halakhic authorities of Anan ben David, the alleged founder of Karaite Judaism, he must therefore have lived a considerable time earlier than Anan. Qallir's time may thus be fixed with some probability as the first half of the 7th century. From a linguistic point of view, it would seem that he lived in the Land of Israel at the end of the sixth century.

Qallir's hymns became an object of study and of Kabbalistic exegesis, as his personality was a mystery. It was related that heavenly fire surrounded him when he wrote the Vehahayot in Kedushah for Rosh Hashanah; that he ascended to heaven and there learned from the angels the secret of writing alphabetical hymns.

A peculiar development of the Qallir legend is seen in the story that Saadia Gaon found in Qallir's tomb a recipe for making amulets in the form of cakes. On a piyyuṭ found in the Mahzor Vitry and ascribed by Henrik Bródy to Qallir, see Max Weisz.

== Poetic style ==
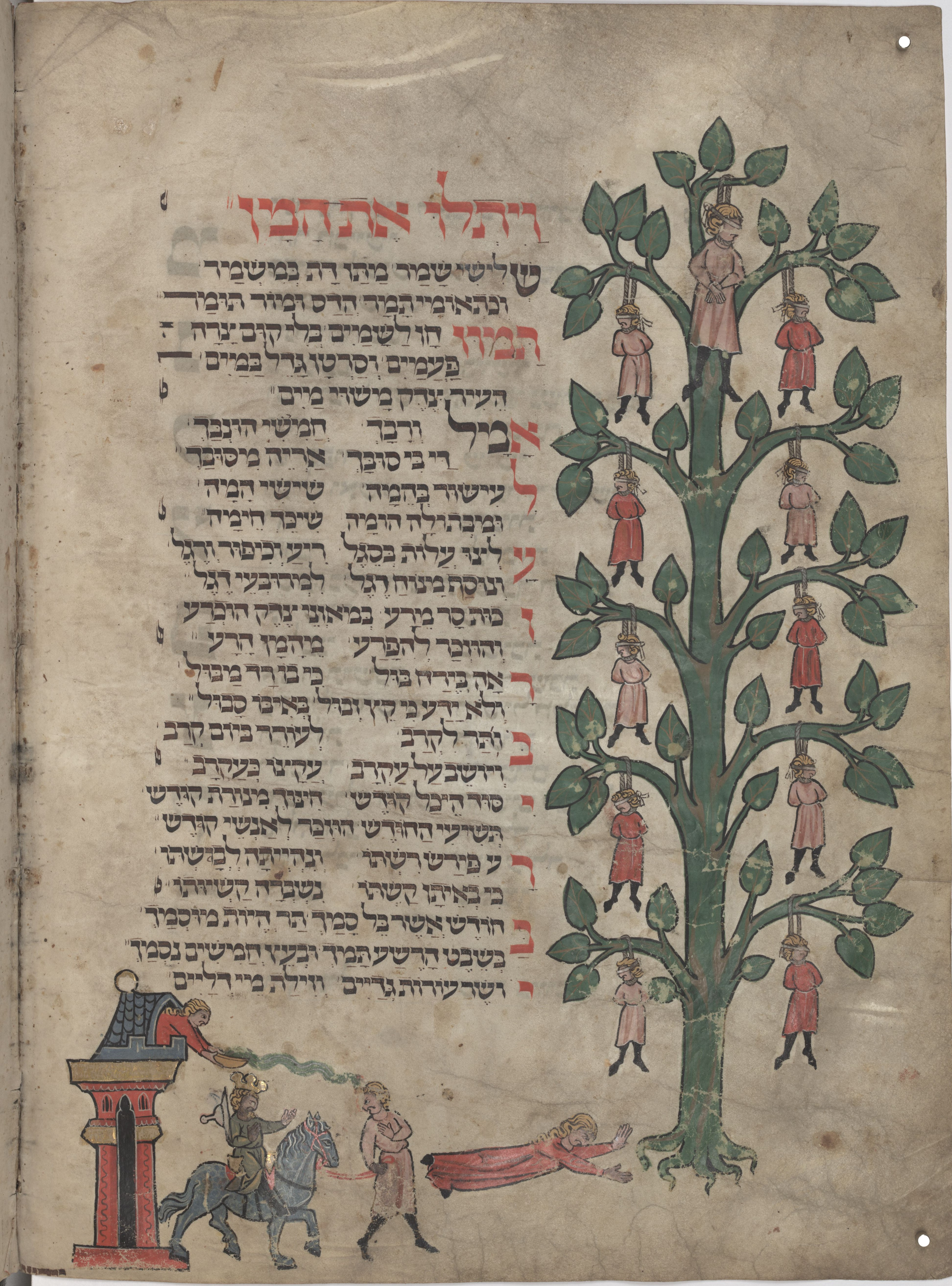
from a Purim piyyuṭ by Qallir, hanging of the sons of Haman, Leipzig Mahzor

The "Kallir style" had a profound influence on the poets who succeeded him in Palestine and the Near East. He made radical innovations in diction and style while employing the full range of Mishnaic Hebrew. It may be that the stories of Yannai growing jealous of him are based in fact because the patterns of rhyme, acrostic, repetition, and refrain in his piyyuṭim are much more complex than those of his master.

His use of neologisms and other oddities has earned him a reputation as an enigmatic writer, to the point where some have criticized him for being obscure and having a corruptive influence on Hebrew. He was, however, capable of writing in simple and direct language, as poems like his Epithalamium demonstrate.

Joseph Solomon Delmedigo warns the student against Qallir's writings because "he has cut up the Hebrew language in an arbitrary way".

Qallir was the first to embellish the entire liturgy with a series of hymns whose essential element was the aggadah. He drew his material from the Talmud, and from midrashic compilations, some of which latter are now probably lost, thus preserving some otherwise forgotten aggadic traditions. Qallir used the early Hekhalot literature of the Merkabah mystics, and traces of their ideas and language appear in his poetry. His language, however, is not that of his sources, but Biblical Hebrew, enriched with daring innovations. His predilection for rare words, allegorical expressions, and aggadic allusions make his writings hard to understand – some describe him as a "Hebrew version of Robert Browning". His linguistic peculiarities were followed by many a succeeding payṭan; and they influenced to some extent even early prose, especially among Karaites.

With the awakening of linguistic studies among the Jews and with the growing acquaintance of the latter with Arabic, his linguistic peculiarities were severely criticized (e.g., by Abraham ibn Ezra, a criticism which centuries later influenced the maskilim in their disparagement of Qallir); but the structure of his hymns remained a model which was followed for centuries after him and which received the name "Kaliric", (or "Kalliri").

== Works ==
While some of his hymns have been lost, more than 200 of them appear in various machzors. Twenty-odd of the kinnot of Tisha B'Av were composed by him too.

Elazar HaQallir was responsible for writing several long piyyutim, known as kerovot, which are recited as part of the repetition of the Amidah on holidays. For example, the piyyut VaYe'ehav Omen is the kerovah for Purim. The tradition of reciting kerovot was followed in the Land of Israel during the Byzantine period, and continues in many Ashkenazi communities to this day.

Although most of Qallir's work remains unpublished, Shulamit Elizur has published four volumes of his poetry for Rosh Hashanah, Yom Kippur, Sukkot and Shemini Atzeret, respectively, and continues to work on his work.

=== Translations ===
Translations of some of his hymns into German are found in Leopold Zunz, in Sachs's edition of the siddur, and in Gustav Karpeles' Zionsharfe and by Jenny Marmorstein. The works that are recited in the Italian Nusach were translated into Italian by Menachem Emanuel Hartom. In the 19th century some were rendered into English by Nina Davis and by Mrs Henry Lucas, other English translations of his work can be found in Abraham Rosenfeld's Tisha B'av Compendium, the various volumes of Service of the Synagogue (the "Routledge" mahzor) and Artscroll.

== Commemoration ==
In Tel Aviv, Elazar HaKalir street near the city hall is named after him. Likewise, in the Jerusalem neighbourhood of Sha'arei Hesed, a street is named after him.
