= Jewish Theological Seminary Library fire =

- Date: April 18, 1966
- Time: 10:15 AM
- Location: Broadway and 122nd Street in Morningside Heights, Manhattan, New York City; 40°48′42.8″N 73°57′38.3″W

The Jewish Theological Seminary Library fire was discovered on Monday, April 18, 1966, at 10:15 AM when smoke was seen pouring from one of the small upper windows of the Jewish Theological Seminary Library tower at Broadway and 122nd Street in Morningside Heights, Manhattan, New York City.

The tower, with only few small windows, was the perfect environment for a major conflagration. There were no floors separating one level from another, only steel library stacks surrounded by catwalks. The tower was like an oven and the fire spread quickly. Extinguishing it was extremely difficult, with only one entrance and stairwell from the bottom and limited window access.

Fire Chief Alfred Eckert dispatched masked firefighters to the highest floor that could be safely reached. The firefighters spread canvas tarpaulins over as many shelves of books as they could, while hook and ladder trucks sprayed water through the highest openings in the tower, cascading down to the fire below. The fire was declared under control at about 7:00 PM, nine hours after it was discovered.

Menachem Schmelzer, the librarian at the time, joined Gerson Cohen, the future chancellor of the Jewish Theological Seminary of America, and the fire chief, for the initial foray into the damp, charred stacks. The fire had been confined primarily to the upper stacks, which housed mostly second and third copies of books, although some important recent acquisitions had also been kept there. But the water had caused enormous damage and the growth of mold threatened to do more.

After rejecting several methods for drying the water-soaked books, the suggestion was brought to Rabbi David Kogen, then-vice chancellor of the Seminary, to place paper towels between the pages of every book to absorb the moisture. Volunteers of all ages were recruited from around the neighborhood and Jewish day school students were brought in to help. The paper toweling was supplied by local retailers and manufacturers.

Some 70,000 volumes were destroyed in the fire and many more were damaged. The library's rare books and manuscripts, which were stored elsewhere, were spared.

The library's book collection was rebuilt with the help of donations from private and institutional libraries. The books were moved to a prefabricated building in the JTS courtyard that remained until a new library building was completed in 1984.

The library now exceeds 380,000 volumes. With the assistance of the Horace W. Goldsmith Foundation, 35,000 books that were saved from the fire and placed in high-density storage are being restored and catalogued.

== See also ==
- List of destroyed libraries
