= Joseph Yahalom =

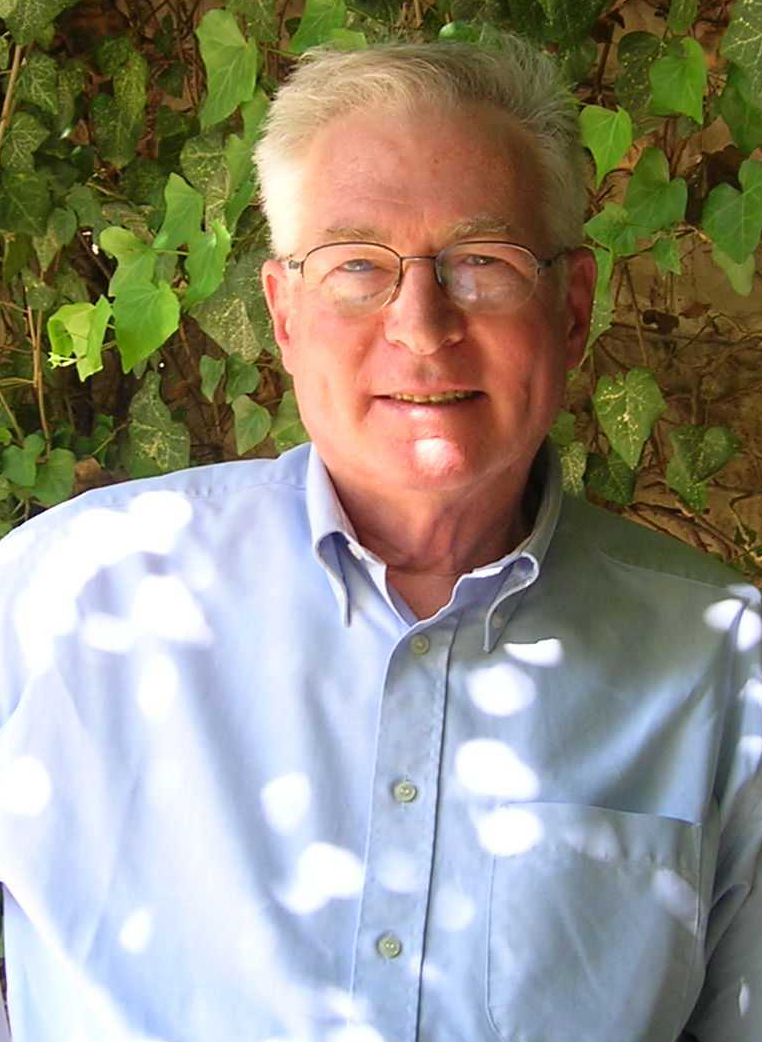
Joseph Yahalom, 2008

Joseph Yahalom (Hebrew: יוסף יהלום; born April 11, 1941) is a professor of Hebrew literature at the Hebrew University of Jerusalem. Since 1983, he has been a member of the Academy of the Hebrew Language.

== Biography ==
Joseph Yahalom was born in Haifa. In 1960, he graduated from Lifshitz College of Education in Jerusalem. In 1962, he completed his B.A. in Hebrew Language and Literature at the Hebrew University. In 1967, he was awarded an M.A. in Hebrew Language from the Hebrew University. In 1973, he completed his Ph.D. at the Hebrew University.

Yahalom is married to Shlomit and has five children, among them physicist Prof. Asher Yahalom and Tamludic scholar Prof. Shalem Yahalom. They live in the Nayot neighborhood of Jerusalem.

== Academic career ==
Yahalom has taught at the Hebrew University of Jerusalem since 1974. He also taught at Harvard University in Boston, the Jewish Theological Seminary in New York, University of Pennsylvania and Yale University. In 1978, he was a research Fellow at the Taylor-Schechter Genizah Unit at Cambridge. He also held a fellowship at the Katz Center for Advanced Judaic Studies from 1998 to 1999. In 1986, he was the editor of Tarbitz Quarterly published by Hebrew University's Institute of Jewish Studies. In 1991, he served as chair of the Hebrew University Department of Hebrew Literature.

Yahalom is the author of numerous books and articles on Hebrew poetry, from Byzantine Palestine (5th century CE) to the early modern period. Much of his work explores the connections between Hebrew poetry and the literature of the other groups living in the same time and place, for example, the link between piyyut and Syriac and Greek Christian hymns; between Hebrew poetry from Spain and the emerging romances in European languages; and between early modern mystical Hebrew poetry in the Ottoman Empire and Turkish songs. He also has written extensively about the bilingual (Hebrew and Arabic) culture of Judah Al-Harizi.

== Awards and recognition ==
- 1970 - Warburg Prize
- 2003 - Ben-Zvi Prize for Life Achievement in the Study of Palestinian Jewry
- 2011 - Giving a Diamond: Essays in honor of Joseph Yahalom on the occasion of his seventieth birthday, edited by Wout van Bekkum and Naoya Katsumata, Leiden: Brill
- 2012 - Bialik Prize

== Published works ==
=== Books ===
In English:

- Ottoman Melodies — Hebrew Hymns: A 16th Century Cross-Cultural Adventure, Hungarian Academy, Budapest 1995, 208 pp (with A. Tietze).
- Palestinian Vocalised Piyyut Manuscripts in the Cambridge Genizah Collections, Cambridge University Press 1997, 187 pp. + 16 plts.
- Avodah: An Anthology of Ancient Poetry for Yom Kippur, (with M.D. Swartz), Pennsylvania 2005, 390 pp.

In Hebrew:

- Yehuda Halevi: Poetry and Pilgrimage
- Poetry and Society in Jewish Galilee of Late Antiquity
- and others

=== Articles ===
- Andalusian poetics and the work of El'azar ben Ya'aqov of Baghdad.. In: Hispania Judaica Bulletin, 4 (2004) 5-21
- Angels do not understand Aramaic: On the literary use of Jewish Palestinian Aramaic in late antiquity.. In: Journal of Jewish Studies, 47,1 (1996) 33-44
- The Aramaic "Alfabetin": From Eretz-Israel to Italy. In: Materia Giudaica, 3 (1997) 56-60
- The context of Hebrew imitations of "muwassahat" in Egypt.. In: Poesía estrófica, (1991) 357-366
- Diwan and odyssey: Judah Halevi and the secular poetry of medieval Spain in the light of new discoveries from Petersburg.. In: Miscelánea de Estudios Árabes y Hebraicos, 44, Sección de Hebreo (1995) 23-45
- The drama of Joseph and his brothers in piyyut literature.. In: Studies in Arabic and Hebrew Letters, (2007) 249-260
- From the material to the spiritual: Scriptural allusions and their development in Judeo-Arabic liturgical poetry. In: Prayers That Cite Scripture, (2006) 101-119
- The journey inward : Judah Halevi between Christians and Muslims in Spain, Egypt, and Palestine.. In: Hebrew Scholarship and the Medieval World, (2001) 138-148
- Judah Halevi: Records of a visitor from Spain. In: The Cambridge Genizah Collections, (2002) 123-135
- Love's labours won: The materialization of love in Hebrew girdle poems. In: Circa 1492, (1992) 189-204
- Lyric and liturgy in the Gabirolian tradition.. In: Zutot, 2 (2002) 41-55
- New clues from an encounter with Old Spanish. In: Jewish Studies at the Turn of the Twentieth Century, I (1999) 561-567
- Paradox in late antique Jewish poetry. In: Jewish Studies in a New Europe, (1998) 886-905
- "Piyyut" as poetry. In: The Synagogue in Late Antiquity, (1987) 111-126
- The poetics of Spanish piyyut in light of Abraham Ibn Ezra's critique of its pre-Spanish precedents. In: Abraham Ibn Ezra y su tiempo, (1990) 387-392
- The Sepphoris synagogue mosaic and its story. In: From Dura to Sepphoris, (2000) 83-91
- Synagogue inscriptions in Palestine - a stylistic classification.. In: Immanuel, 10 (1980) 47-56
- Syriac for dirges, Hebrew for speech: Ancient Jewish poetry in Aramaic and Hebrew.. In: The Literature of the Sages, II (2006) 375-391
- The Temple and the city in liturgical Hebrew poetry. In: The History of Jerusalem, (1996) 270-294
- Tensions between Sephardic traditions and Ottoman influences in Jewish literary activity. In: Between History and Literature, (1997) 207-216

== See also ==
- Jewish literature
