= Yannai (Payetan) =

Byzantine Galilee payyetan; late fifth-early sixth century

Yannai (Hebrew: יניי or ינאי) was an important payyetan who lived in the late fifth-early sixth century in the Galilee in Israel (Byzantine-Palestina Syria). Sometimes referred to as the "father of piyyut," his poetry marks the beginning of the Classical Period of piyyut that ranged from the fifth-eighth centuries. He was the first poet of piyyut to sign his name in an acrostic, to use end-rhyme, and to write for weekly services (not just for the High Holidays and particular festivals). According to Laura Lieber, the liturgical form most associated with Yannai is the qedushta, which embellishes the first 3 blessing of the Amidah (a part of the Jewish prayer service).

Although Yannai was renowned and influential during his time (he influenced the poet Eleazar ben Kalir), by the Middle Ages, much of his poetry had disappeared from the prayer book. Excepting a few poems, Yannai's work was essentially lost until its rediscovery in the Cairo Genizah. Medieval rabbi Ephraim of Bonn records a story in which Yannai became jealous of the great success of his student Eleazar ben Kalir, and killed him by hiding a scorpion in his sandal, and for this reason Yannai's piyyutim are not recited in prayers. However, Ephraim himself cast doubt on the reliability of the story. Modern scholarship does not accept the historicity of the story, due to both chronological considerations, and the fact that Yannai was praised by many later figures.

In terms of textual editions, in the early twentieth century, Mahzor Yannai and Menahem Zulay's "Liturgical Poems of Yannai" were published. Z.M. Rabinowitz's critical edition of Yannai has become the foundation for contemporary studies of the text. Recently, Laura Lieber's critical translation and study of Yannai's poems has opened Yannai's poems up for study to scholars working more broadly on ancient Judaism, Christian liturgy, late antiquity, and early Byzantine history.

It is speculated that he may have composed the famous Unettaneh Tokef prayer. In 1938, Zulay published poems of Yannai collected from Geniza fragments.

The following are a few example of his piyyutim:

- אוני פטרי רחמתים: A ḳerovah which was probably originally written for the Sabbath on the triennial cycle beginning "ve-yehi ba-hatsi ha-layala", but which is recited in the Western Ashkenazic rite for Sabbath ha-Gadol. It includes the piyyut אז רוב נסים הפלאת בלילה, which made its way into the Passover Haggadah.
- שיר השירים אשירה נא לידידי : A shiv'ata for the seventh day of Pesaḥ. The middle portion is missing. It is designated as דרמושה (this reading must be substituted for the senseless לרמושה in the superscription), i.e., "bolt" or "beam" (δρόμος, otherwise called רהיט), and forms a sort of textual variation of Song of Songs, following the conception and interpretation of that book in the Midrash.
- תעו אז בפתרוס: A silluḳ for Sabbath Shim'u, i.e., the second Sabbath before Tisha b'Av.

Yannai, like his predecessor Jose ben Jose, is not as obscure in his vocabulary and in his metaphors as is Kalir, who is said to have been Yannai's pupil.
