= Jonah Frankel =

Israeli author and scholar of Hebrew literature

- יונה פרנקל
- Born: August 3, 1928; Munich, Germany
- Died: September 2, 2012 (aged 84); Jerusalem, Israel
- Occupations: Author, Professor of Hebrew literature
- Known for: He specialized in the study of Midrash and Aggadah in the Talmud.
- Awards: Bialik Prize (1993); Israel Prize (2000)

Academic background
- Education: Hebrew University of Jerusalem

Academic work
- Discipline: Hebrew Literature
- Sub-discipline: Aggadah and Midrash
- Institutions: Hebrew University of Jerusalem

Jonah Frankel, (Hebrew: יונה פרנקל) also spelled Yonah Frankel, (1928–2012) was an author, Hebrew literature professor and Israel Prize laureate.

== Biography ==
Jonah Frankel was born in Munich in 1928 and emigrated to Israel in 1937 to escape the Nazis. In high school, he studied at the Yeshiva of Kfar Haroeh. He then went on to study Hebrew Literature and Talmud at the Hebrew University, and in 1968, he completed his PhD in Talmud. He was a Professor Emeritus of Aggadah and Midrash in the Department of Hebrew Literature at the Hebrew University of Jerusalem. He has been described as "an expert in the study of Midrashic Aggadah".

Professor Frankel's main contribution to research was the innovative approach he introduced to the study of the Aggadot of the Talmud. Until his time, these stories were typically viewed either as historical sources or as folklore. Frankel established a new school of thought, treating the Talmudic Aggadah through the methods of literary criticism, independent of the historical or cultural context in which they were written. He focused on the idea and message behind each Aggadah, conducting a scholarly comparison of different versions of Aggadic texts found in various sources. His influence has been immense, and to this day, Talmudic Aggadot are studied in literature departments at universities.

He was also a scholar of piyyut, and he continued the project of the Goldschmidt-Fraenkel Machzor, started by his father-in-law, Professor Daniel Goldschmidt.

== Published works ==
- Darkhei Ha-Aggadah VeHa-Midrash (The Ways of the Midrash and the Aggadah), a two volume set, is an encyclopedic guide to the study of Midrash and Aggadah in broader Jewish culture.
- Time and its role in the aggadic story (Jewish civilization university series)

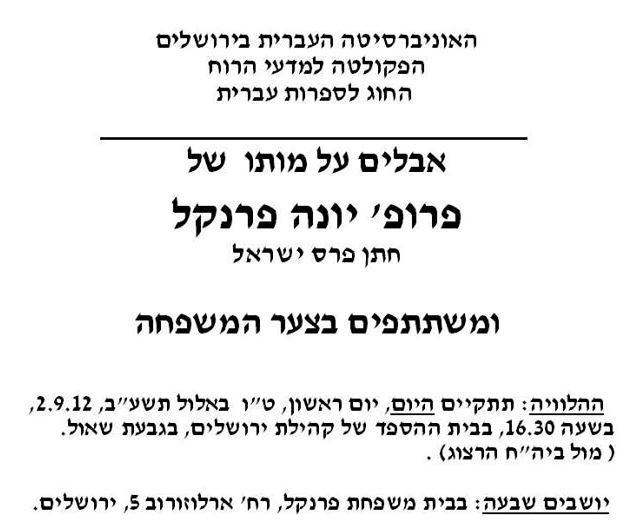
Jonah Frankel Death Notice Poster

== Awards and honors ==
- In 1993, Jonah Frankel received the Bialik Prize for significant accomplishments in Hebrew literature.
- In 2000, Jonah Frankel won the Israel Prize in Talmudic research, for his work on interpreting midrash and aggada.
- In 2006, Magnes Press published a volume of studies in honor of Jonah Frankel, titled Higayon L'Yona: New Aspects in the Study of Midrash, Aggadah and Piyut, In Honor of Professor Yona Fraenkel. The book, edited by Galit Hasan-Rokem and others, features contributions from prominent scholars including Daniel Boyarin, Ezra Fleischer and Moshe Halbertal.
