= Moses Levi Ehrenreich =

Italian rabbi

Moses Levi Ehrenreich (1818 in Brody, Galicia – December 27, 1899 in Rome) was an Italian rabbi, who became chief rabbi at Rome.

== Life ==
Having graduated from the gymnasium of Brody, Ehrenreich, attracted by the reputation of Samuel David Luzzatto, went to Padua to study at the Istituto Rabbinico, where he received the rabbinical diploma on 10 May 1845. He immediately began teaching at Görtz, where he became friendly with Isaac Reggio, whose daughter Helena he later married.

After a short stay at Trieste, he became rabbi at Modena, and in 1861 rabbi at Casale, Piedmont. In 1871 he was teacher to the families of Guastalla and Malvano at Turin, and in 1882 he was called to the principalship of the Talmud Torah in Rome, shortly afterward becoming chief rabbi of Rome. It was through his efforts and under his direction that the Collegio Rabbinico Italiano was reopened in 1887. In 1894 old age compelled his retirement from the rabbinate.

== Works ==
His chief literary work consisted of the part he took of the translation of the Bible into Italian under the direction of Luzzatto, for which he translated Hosea, Micah, Daniel, Ezra and Nehemiah. He also wrote a biography of his father-in-law, Isaac Reggio. He was a member of the committee of the society of Meḳiẓe Nirdamim from its reestablishment in 1885.
