= Israel Davidson =

American writer and publisher

- Born: May 27, 1870; Jonava, Lithuania
- Died: 1939; Great Neck, New York, United States
- Education: Columbia University
- Occupations: Writer, publisher
- Known for: Otsar ha-shirah veha-piyut (Thesaurus of Mediaeval Hebrew Poetry)

Israel Davidson (May 27, 1870 – 1939) was an American writer and publisher. He was of Lithuanian Jewish heritage. He has been recognized as one of the leading American Hebrew writers in his era. His magnum opus was the four volume Otsar ha-shirah veha-piyut = Thesaurus of Mediaeval Hebrew Poetry (NY, 1924–1933).

Davidson was born in Jonava, Lithuania. He studied in yeshivas in Jonava, Volozhin, and Slobodka. In 1898, he immigrated to New York, worked a few occupations before earning a Ph.D. from Columbia University. He died in Great Neck, New York in 1939.

== Works ==
- The Jew in English Fiction. New York: A. H. Rosenberg, 1895.
- The Genesis of Hebrew Periodical Literature. New York: Kohn & Pollock, 1900.
- Parody in Jewish Literature. New York: Columbia University, 1907.
- Saadia’s Polemic Against Ḥiwi al-Balkhi: A Fragment. Edited by Israel Davidson. New York: Jewish Theological Seminary of America, 1915. ISBN 9780524080542
- Otsar ha-shirah veha-piyut (Thesaurus of Mediaeval Hebrew Poetry). 4 vols. New York, 1924–1933.
- Rhymes in Hebrew Poetry. Edited by Ismar Elbogen. Philadelphia: Dropsie College, 1940.
