= Menahem Schmelzer =

Hungarian-American Jewish librarian and writer

Menahem Hayyim Schmelzer (Hebrew: מנחם חיים שמלצר; 18 April 1934 – 10 December 2022) was a Hungarian-American Jewish librarian and writer.

He was the Albert B. and Bernice Cohen Professor Emeritus of Medieval Hebrew Literature and Jewish Bibliography at the Jewish Theological Seminary of America. He began his career at JTS in 1961 and was Librarian from 1966 to 1987.

A master of piyyut (Jewish liturgical poetry) and of Jewish liturgy, he was a preeminent specialist in medieval Hebrew literature and published extensively on Ashkenazi piyyut. He was known for his depth of knowledge in the field of Hebrew manuscripts and Jewish bibliography, whose "astounding command" of the details of the collection made him the 'go-to' person on questions of Jewish bibliography for researchers around the world.

== Biography ==
Menahem Schmelzer was born in April 1934 in the Hungarian village of Kecel to parents Ferenc and Margit. His father was a winemaker and his mother a homemaker. During the war his father was sent to a MUSZ labor camp (Hungarian: munkaszolgálat). He, his brother and his mother were sent to a ghetto and later deported to Auschwitz. He and his family survived the Holocaust when their train, which was bound for Auschwitz, was diverted to the Strasshof labor camp near Vienna, as part of the Kastner deal.

After the war the Schmelzers moved to Budapest where Menahem studied in high school and several yeshivot. He later studied Semitic languages (Arabic, Persian, Egyptology, and Assyriology) and ancient history at Eötvös Loránd University in Budapest and at the Jewish Theological Seminary—University of Jewish Studies, where he came under the influence of Professor Alexander Scheiber, whose works on liturgical poetry, Geniza manuscripts, and Hebrew booklore played an important influence.

He left Hungary after the Communist uprising in 1956 and moved to Switzerland where he studied Bible and Arabic at Basel University, concurrently serving as librarian of the Jewish community. He moved to Denmark where he trained as a Judaica librarian in the Simonsen Collection of the Royal Library of Denmark in Copenhagen, receiving a librarian’s degree from the State Library School and an M.A. from the University of Copenhagen.

In 1960–61, he worked briefly at the Thomas Mann archive in Zurich, and then in the manuscript division of the Jewish National and University Library in Jerusalem.

He moved to New York in 1961 to work in the JTS library and to serve on its faculty; he became associate librarian in 1963 and Librarian in 1966, the first professionally trained librarian in the history of this renowned research library. He served in that capacity until 1987. In April 1966, a fire broke out in the library stacks; the fire and the water used to extinguish it destroyed and damaged a large part of the circulating collection and rendered the tower that housed the stacks unusable. The books and offices were moved into a temporary structure for seventeen years, while a new library was designed, constructed, and put into operation under Schmelzer’s supervision.

He retired from JTS in 2003 after serving as Librarian of JTS’s renowned Judaic collection, as provost, and as a member of the faculty.

He was awarded a doctorate of Hebrew Letters from JTS in 1965 for his dissertation on the poetry of Isaac Ibn Ghiyyath, which he wrote under the supervision of Professor Shalom Spiegel.

In addition to writing numerous articles and reviews for scholarly journals, Schmelzer was associate division editor of the “Modern Jewish Scholarship” section of Encyclopaedia Judaica. He lectured at the Leo Baeck Institute, Yeshiva University, and the Hungarian Academy of Sciences.

Schmelzer died on 10 December 2022 in his home. He was 88 years old.

== Fellowships and appointments ==
In 1992, he received a Guggenheim Fellowship.

In 1999, he received an honorary degree from the Spertus Institute of Jewish Studies in Chicago.

He was appointed distinguished visiting senior scholar at the Kluge Center in the Library of Congress in 2004.

He became a fellow of the AAJR in 2009.

He received an honorary doctorate from JTS in 2010 as well as The Alexander Scheiber Prize by Hungary’s Ministry of Education and Culture.

In 2023 the American Library Association issued a memorial resolution in his memory citing the significant contributions and accomplishments of Menahem Schmelzer over the course of his career.

== Bibliography ==
=== Selection of books ===
- Menahem H. Schmelzer, Studies in Jewish Bibliography & Medieval Hebrew Poetry. New York and Jerusalem: Jewish Theological Seminary of America, 2006. 548 pp
- Shalom Spiegel, Menahem H. Schmelzer, ed. Avot hapiyyut. New York and Jerusalem: Jewish Theological Seminary of America, 1996, 434 pp.
- Menahem H. Schmelzer, Guides to the perplexed in the wilderness of Hebraica: From historical to contemporary bibliographies and catalogs of Hebraica. Harvard College Library, 1996. 23 pp
- Menahem H. Schmelzer, The Rothschild Mahzor: Florence, 1492. New York: Jewish Theological Seminary of America. 1984, 57 pp.
- Menahem H. Schmelzer, A Májmúni Kódex [Mosé Májmúni Törvénykódexe]: A Budapesti "Misné Tóra" legszebb lapjai. Library of Hebrew Union College-Jewish Institute of Religion, 1984
- Menahem H. Schmelzer, ed. Poems of Isaac Ben Abraham Ibn Ezra (Hebrew) New York and Jerusalem: Jewish Theological Seminary of America, 1979, 171pp.
- Alexander Marx, Menahem H. Schmelzer ed. Bibliographical Studies and Notes on Rare Books and Manuscripts in the Library of the Jewish Theological Seminary of America. Jewish Theological Seminary of America and Ktav Publishing House, 1977, 591 pp

=== Selection of articles ===
- Menahem Schmelzer, "The Dispute over a Rabbinic Appointment to a Synagogue in Seventeenth-Century Buda," in Moshe Bar-Asher, et al., eds., Professor Meir Benayahu Memorial Volume, vol. 1: Studies in Talmud, Halakhah, Custom, and Jewish History (Jerusalem: Yad ha-Rav Nissim, 2019), 651-660 (Hebrew)
- Menahem Schmelzer, "Rabbi Hajim Szofer prédikációi," in Bacher Vilmos emlékelőadások, 1989-2013: ünnepi kötet Komoróczy Géza 80. születésnapjára (Budapest: Magyar Hebraisztikai Társaság, 2017), 243-247 (Hungarian)
- Menahem Schmelzer, "Poems in Praise of Books by David Ben Joseph Ibn Yahya," in Yaron Ben-Naeh, Jeremy Cohen, Moshe Idel, and Yosef Kaplan, eds., Studies in Jewish History Presented to Joseph Hacker (Jerusalem: Shazar, 2014), 322-335 (Hebrew)
- Menahem Schmelzer, "Scheiber's Beloved Books," in Máté Hidvégi, ed., Alexander Scheiber and the Bibliography of His Writings (Budapest: OR-ZSE, 2013), 135-139
- Menahem Schmelzer, "Löw Immánuel és Scheiber Sándor," in Babits Antal, ed., Papírhíd (Budapest: Logos Kiadó, 2013), 187-197 (Hungarian)
- Menahem Schmelzer, "Avigdor Aptowitzer’s Letters to Shalom Spiegel," Tarbiz, vol. 81 (2013): 459-468 (Hebrew)
- Menahem Schmelzer, "Die Braginsky Collection," in Emile G.L. Schrijver, et al., eds., Schöne Seiten: Jüdische Schriftkultur aus der Braginsky Collection (Zurich: Scheidegger and Spiess, 2011), 17-21
- Istvan Daniel Loewinger and Menahem Schmelzer, "Report on the State of Jewish Communities in Western Hungary, 22 September 1955," in Zsuzsanna Toronyi, ed., Zsidó közösségek öröksége [=The Inheritance of Jewish Communities] (Budapest: Magyar Zsido Okleveltar, 2010), 93-113 (Hungarian)
- Menahem Schmelzer, "A Piyyut for Weddings by Kalonymus ben Judah," in Joel Roth, et al., eds., Tiferet le-Yisrael: Jubilee Volume in Honor of Israel Francus (New York: Jewish Theological Seminary of America, 2010), 275-288 (Hebrew)
- Menahem Schmelzer, "Moritz Steinschneider: An Appreciation," Quntres, vol. 1, no. 1 (February 2009): 23-39
- Menahem Schmelzer, "Review of ‘Avodah: An Anthology of Ancient Poetry for Yom Kippur’, by Michael D. Swartz and Joseph Yahalom," AJS Review, vol. 31, no. 1 (April 2007): 178-180
- Menahem Schmelzer, "The Liturgy of the Prato Haggadah," in Naomi M. Steinberger, ed., The Prato Haggadah (New York: Jewish Theological Seminary, 2007), 53-67
- Menahem Schmelzer, "The Bishop of the Moravian Church and Berlin’s Hebrew Printing Press," in David Golinkin, et al., eds., Torah li-Shamma: Essays in Jewish Studies in Honor of Professor Shamma Friedman (Jerusalem: Schechter Institute, 2007), lxx-xcii
- Menahem Schmelzer, "Herbert Zafren (1925-2005): Remembrances," Judaica Librarianship, vol. 12 (2006): 7-8
- Menahem Schmelzer, "Wedding Piyyutim by the Early Sages of Ashkenaz," in Ephraim Hazan and Joseph Yahalom, eds., Studies in Hebrew Poetry and Jewish Heritage in Memory of Aharon Mirsky (Ramat-Gan: Bar-Ilan University, 2006), 173-185 (Hebrew)
- Menahem Schmelzer, “Low Henrik Jakab, Egy Magyar Maszkil Lord Byron Kain-Janak Heber Forditoja,” in Hetven év: emlékkönyv Schweitzer József születésnapjára / Seventy Years: Memorial Volume for Dr. Joseph Schweitzer’s Birthday (Budapest: Budapesti Zsidó Hitközség, 1992), 121-126 (Hungarian)
- Menahem Schmelzer, “Hebrew Printing and Publishing in Germany, 1650–1750: On Jewish Book Culture and the Emergence of Modern Jewry,” Leo Baeck Institute Yearbook, no. 33 (1988): 369-383
- Menahem Schmelzer, Studies in Jewish Bibliography and Medieval Hebrew Poetry, “Two Philosophical Passages in the Liturgical Poetry of Rabbi Isaac Ibn Giat,” P.233-238: JTSA Press, 2011.
- Menahem Schmelzer, "Two Philosophical Passages in the Liturgical Poetry of Rabbi Isaac Ibn Giat" in Of Scholars, Savants, and their Texts, Editor Ruth Link-Salinger, Peter Lang, New York, 209-216.
- Menahem Schmelzer, "The Piyyutim of Isaac Ibn Giat" in Cairo Geniza Studies, Mordechai A. Friedman, Editor, Tel-Aviv University, 1980, 89-95
- Menahem Schmelzer, "A Short Avodah by R. Isaac Ibn Giat" in The A.M. Haberman Memorial Volume, Zvi Malachi, Editor, Tel Aviv University, 1983, 159-160.
- Menahem Schmelzer, "Five Zulatot of Isaac Ibn Giat" in Papers on Medieval Hebrew Literature Presented To A.M. Haermann on the occasion of his 75th birthday, Zvi Malachi, Editor, The Tel-Aviv University, 1977, 329-342

=== Articles in honor of Menahem Schmelzer ===
- David Sclar, "A Personal Reflection on the Life and Work of Menahem Schmelzer (1934–2022)," Judaica Librarianship, vol. 23 (2024): 211-214
- Hermann (Imre) Schmelzer and Jozsef Schweitzer, "Honoring Menahem Hayyim Schmelzer: A Biographical Profile of A Great Scholar and Librarian," in Shmuel Glick, et al., eds., Meḥevah le-Menaḥem: Studies in Honor of Menahem Hayyim Schmelzer* (Jerusalem: Schocken, 2019), 5-21
- Shmuel Glick, Evelyn M. Cohen, Angelo M. Piattelli, et al. eds. *Meḥevah le-Menaḥem: Studies in Honor of Menahem Hayyim Schmelzer*, (Jerusalem: Schocken, 2019)
- Debra Reed Blank, ed. "The Experience of Jewish Liturgy: Studies Dedicated to Menahem Schmelzer*, (Leiden: Brill, 2011)
