= Joseph Zedner =

German Jewish bibliographer and librarian

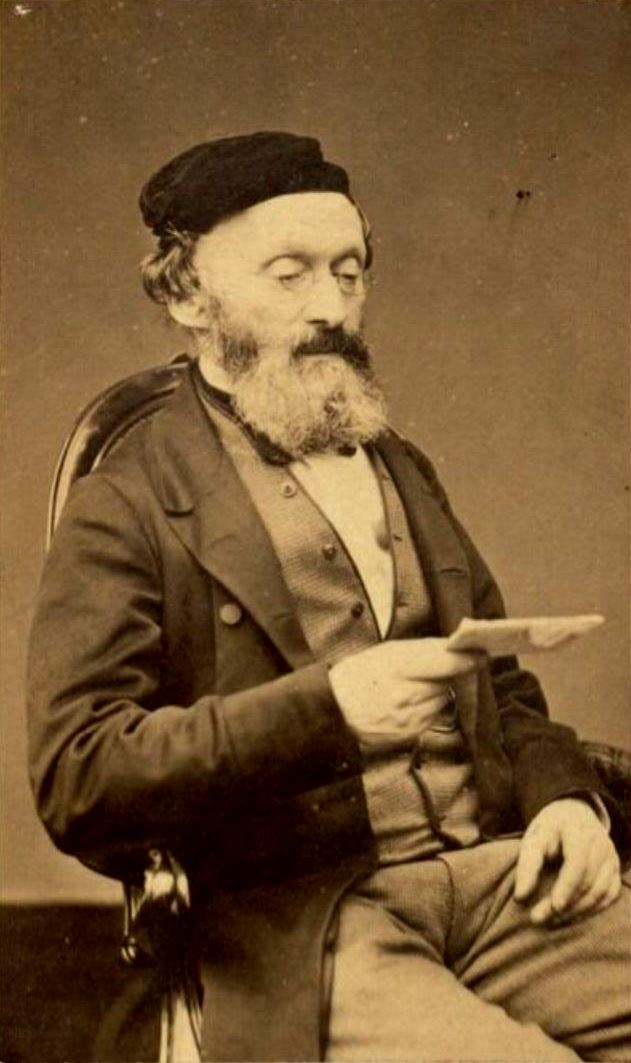
- Born: 10 February 1804; Groß-Glogau, Silesia, Prussia
- Died: 10 October 1871 (aged 67); Berlin, Prussia, Germany
- Occupations: Bibliographer and librarian

Joseph Zedner (10 February 1804 – 10 October 1871) was a German Jewish bibliographer and librarian.

After completing his education, he acted as teacher in the Jewish school in Strelitz (Mecklenburg), where the lexicographer Daniel Sanders was his pupil. In 1832 he became a tutor to the family of the book-seller A. Asher in Berlin, and later engaged in the book-trade himself; but being unsuccessful he accepted in 1845 a position as librarian of the Hebrew department of the British Museum in London. There he remained until 1869, when ill health compelled him to resign and to retire to Berlin, where he spent the last two years of his life. Shortly after his appointment, the British Museum acquired the library of the bibliophile Heimann J. Michael of Hamburg, which Zedner catalogued.

== Works ==
Zedner was the author of the following works:

- Auswahl Historischer Stücke aus Hebräischen Schriftstellern vom Zweiten Jahrhundert bis in die Gegenwart, mit Vocalisiertem Texte, Deutscher Uebersetzung und Anmerkungen (Berlin, 1840)
- Catalogue of the Hebrew Books in the Library of the British Museum (London, 1867)
- Ein Fragment aus dem Letzten Gesange von Reineke Fuchs (Berlin, 1871), a poetical satire on Napoleon III.

He contributed to Asher's edition of the Travels of Benjamin of Tudela (London, 1840), and wrote poems on two collections of portraits (Ehret die Frauen, and Edelsteine und Perlen, Berlin, 1836–45). While in London, he published a second edition of Ibn Ezra's commentary on the Book of Esther, to which he wrote an introduction entitled "Wa-Yosef Abraham."
