= Wout van Bekkum =

Dutch historian

Wouter Jacques "Wout" van Bekkum (born 21 May 1954) is a Dutch professor emeritus of Middle East Studies at the University of Groningen. His expertise lies in the field of Semitic languages and cultures, especially the different varieties of the Hebrew language and Hebrew poetry from Late Antiquity until pre-modern times.

== Career ==
Van Bekkum was born on 21 May 1954 in Winschoten. His mother was Jewish and the only one of her family to return from Auschwitz concentration camp. Hearing this story at age twelve sparked his interest in Judaism. During his life van Bekkum committed himself to the Jewish heritage and community in Groningen. His mother also noticed his interest in foreign scripts and stimulated his interest in the field, which made him abandon his plans to become an English teacher. This led to him starting a study of Semitic languages and cultures at the University of Groningen in 1972. When he started in 1972 he was the only student who applied for the program. He studied until 1979 and for the final year of his study he did a one-year program at the Hebrew University of Jerusalem. After completing his studies he was a student assistant in Hebrew and Judaeo-Arabic Linguistics for one year before being appointed as assistant-teacher in Modern Hebrew in 1980. Van Bekkum kept this position until 1986. In that year he started as lecturer of Classical, Rabbinic, Medieval and Modern Hebrew. In 1988 he earned his doctor title in Medieval Hebrew Poetry at the University of Groningen with a thesis titled: The Qedushta'ot of Yehudah according to Genizah Manuscripts. In 2000 he was appointed as full professor of Middle Eastern studies. During his career he was mostly focused on medieval Jewish poetry and Hebrew and Judeo-Arabic linguistics, specializing in piyyut. After the student number and satisfaction dropped for the academic program, the academic program was in risk of being scrapped. Van Bekkum designed a new curriculum and managed to revitalize the program and attract more students.

In 1996, aside from his work at the University of Groningen, he also started working as professor occupying an endowed chair (Dutch: bijzonder hoogleraar) of Modern Jewish history at the University of Amsterdam. He remained in function in Amsterdam until 2001.

Van Bekkum was elected a member of the Royal Netherlands Academy of Arts and Sciences in 2003. In 2019 during the Medieval Hebrew Poetry Colloquium in Leuven, Belgium, he was honored with a Festschrift, edited by Joachim Yeshaya, Elisabeth Hollender, Naoya Katsumata, The Poet and the World, Festschrift for Wout van Bekkum on the Occasion of His Sixty-Fifth Birthday, Studia Judaica 107, De Gruyter Berlin, 339 pages. On 24 April 2020 he was appointed Officer in the Order of Orange-Nassau. Van Bekkum took up emeritus status in 2020.

== Main publications ==
van Bekkum, W. J. (1998). Hebrew Poetry from Late Antiquity. Liturgical Poems of Yehudah. Critical Edition with Introduction & Commentary. (vol. 43 ed.) Leiden: Martinus Nijhoff/Brill.

van Bekkum, W. J. (2007). The Secular Poetry of El 'azar ben Ya'aqov ha-Bavli. Baghdad, Thirteenth Century, on the basis of Manuscript Heb. IIA, 210.1. EJM 34. Leiden-Boston: Brill.

van Bekkum, W.J. (2023). The Religious Poetry of El'azar ben Ya'aqov ha-Bavli. Baghdad, Thirteenth Century. EJM 94. Leiden-Boston: Brill.

van Bekkum, W. J., & Katsumata, N. (2011). Giving a Diamond, Essays in Honor of Joseph Yahalom on the Occasion of His Seventieth Birthday. (Tome XLIX ed.) Leiden-Boston: Brill.

van Bekkum, W. J. (1996). Deutung und Bedeuting in der hebraïschen Exegese. Frankfurter Judaistische Beiträge, 23, 1 - 13.

van Bekkum, W. J. (1998). Lights of Sion and Lights of Edom. Dutch Studies published by NELL, 1-2, 109 - 120.

van Bekkum, W. J. (2002). Reconstruction of Yiddish Colloquial in Winschoten. In K. Siewert (Ed.), Aspekte und Ergebnisse der Sondersprachenforschung II (pp. 197 - 208). (Sondersprachenforschung; No. 7). Wiesbaden: Harrassowitz.

van Bekkum, W. J. (2008). Qumran Hymnology and Piyyut: Contrast and Comparison. Revue de Qumran, Numéro 91(Tome 23), 341 - 356.

van Bekkum, W. J. (2009). Discussing Cultural Influences: Text, Context, and Non-Text in Rabbinic Judaism. Journal of the American Oriental Society, 129(1), 139–141.

van Bekkum, W. J. (2011). The Future of Ancient Piyyut. In M. Goodman, & P. Alexander (Eds.), Rabbinic Texts and the History of Late-Roman Palestine (pp. 217 - 233). Oxford: Oxford University Press.

van Bekkum, W. J. (2012). Hebrew Poetry. In S. Cushman, & R. Greene (Eds.), The Princeton Encyclopedia of Poetry and Poetics (pp. 601 - 610).

van Bekkum, W. J. (2013). Leopold Zunz and Jewish Hymnology. European Journal of Jewish Studies, 7.2, 187 - 197.

van Bekkum, W., & Katsumata, N. (2017). Between Convention and Innovation: A Study of Thematic and Literary Features of Three Sedarim for Wayyosha of the tenth and eleventh centuries . Journal of Jewish Studies, 68(2), 324–345.
