= Hayyim Schirmann =

Israeli historian

- חיים שירמן
- Born: 19 October 1904; Kiev, Russian Empire
- Died: 14 June 1981 (aged 76); Paris, France
- Occupations: Scholar, professor
- Awards: Israel Prize (1957)

Academic background
- Education: Semitic linguistics, Berlin University (1930)

Academic work
- Discipline: Medieval Jewish poetry
- Sub-discipline: Medieval Spanish and Italian Jewish poetry
- Institutions: Hebrew University of Jerusalem

Hayyim (Jefim) Schirmann (Hebrew: חיים שירמן; October 19, 1904 – June 14, 1981) was an Israeli scholar of medieval Spanish and Italian Jewish poetry.

== Biography ==
Hayyim Schirmann was born in Kiev in the Russian Empire. He studied in his home country until 1919. His family then moved to Germany. he received a degree in Semitic linguistics from Berlin University in 1930.

== Academic career ==
Schirmann joined the Schocken Institute for Study of Medieval Hebrew Poetry in 1930, and emigrated to Mandate Palestine, now Israel, in 1934 when the Institute relocated there.

He began lecturing in medieval poetry at the Hebrew University of Jerusalem in 1942, and became a professor there in 1954. Schirmann continuing his work at the university until 1968. He died in Paris in 1981.

Schirmann was also a violinist. He published essays on music and drew parallels between music and Jewish literature in his literary works.

== Awards and recognition ==
In 1957, Schirmann was awarded the Israel Prize, for Jewish studies.

== Published works ==
- Die hebräische Übersetzung der Maqamen des Hariri (Schriften der Gesellschaft zur Förderung der Wissenschaft des Judentums 37). Frankfurt am Main: J. Kauffmann 1930.
- מבחר השירה העברית באיטליה [Anthology of Hebrew Poetry in Italy]. Berlin: Schocken 1934.
- השירה העברית בספרד ובפרובאנס [Hebrew Poetry of Spain and Provence]. 2 vols. Jerusalem 1954/56.
- תולדות השירה העברית בספרד המוסלמית [The History of Hebrew Poetry in Muslim Spain. Edited, Supplemented and Annotated by Ezra Fleischer.] Jerusalem: Magnes 1995. ISBN 965-223-914-3
- תולדות השירה העברית בספרד הנוצרית ובדרום צרפת [The History of Hebrew Poetry in Christian Spain and Southern France. Edited, Supplemented and Annotated by Ezra Fleischer]. Jerusalem: Magnes 1997. ISBN 965-223-963-1
