= Alexander Marx =

American historian, bibliographer and librarian

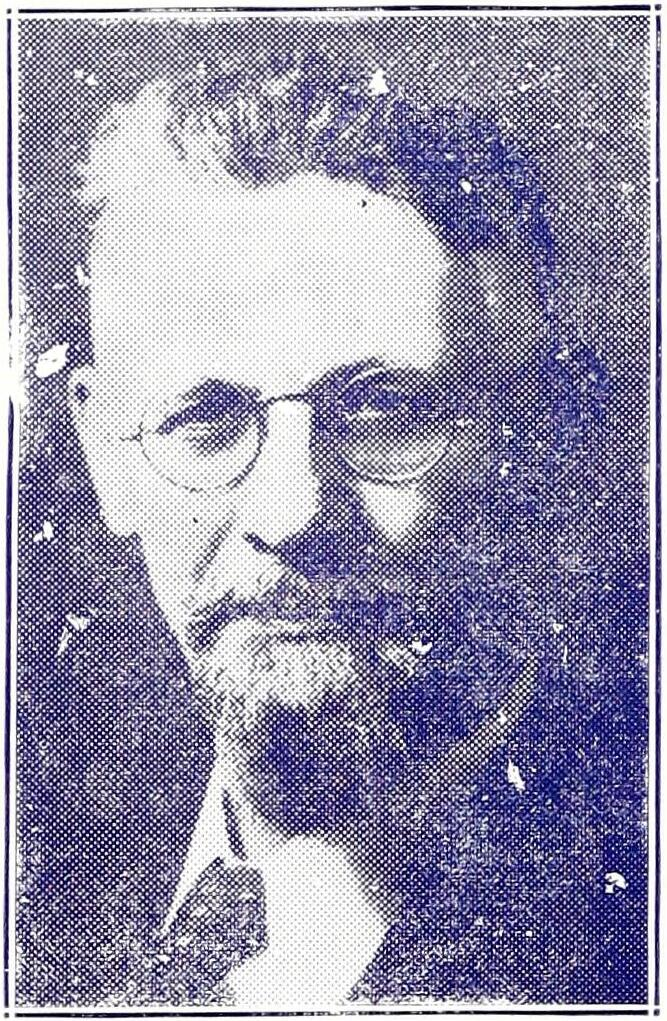
Marx c. 1938

Alexander Marx (1878–1953) was an American historian, bibliographer and librarian.

== Biography ==
Born in Elberfeld, Germany, son of George Marx, a banker, and Gertrud Marx-Simon, a published poet. Alexander Marx grew up in Königsberg (East Prussia). He spent a year in a Prussian artillery regiment where he excelled in horsemanship. Later he studied at the University of Berlin and at the Rabbiner-Seminar (Berlin), marrying in 1905 Hannah the daughter of R' David Zvi Hoffmann, rector of the Seminar. In 1903, Marx accepted Solomon Schechter's invitation to teach history at the Jewish Theological Seminary of America and be its librarian. Marx came to Jerusalem in the 1950s to give Ben Gurion the prize from the J.T.S. His siblings include Moses Marx, another librarian, and Esther Marx, wife of S.Y. Agnon.

== Works ==
Marx published articles in many languages and was at home in both classical and Semitic languages. Marx contributed monographs and articles to journals on a wide variety of subjects, published two volumes of collected essays (Studies in Jewish History and Booklore (1944); Essays in Jewish Biography (1947)), and with Max L. Margolis wrote A History of the Jewish people (Jewish Publication Society of America, 1927, 1962). This pioneering work, stressed economic and social life, organization and legal status. It offers the reader a soundly researched, authoritative, and objective Jewish history in one volume.

In later years he also served as a member of the publications committee of the Jewish Publication Society of America.

== As librarian ==
The Jewish Theological Seminary Library on his arrival in 1903 contained 5,000 volumes and 3 manuscripts. At his death it possessed 165,000 books and over 9,000 Hebrew, Samaritan, Aramaic, and Yiddish manuscripts, comprising the largest Judaica collection in the world. Much of Marx's research in early Jewish printing remains unpublished.
