= Machzor =

Prayer book used by Jews on holidays

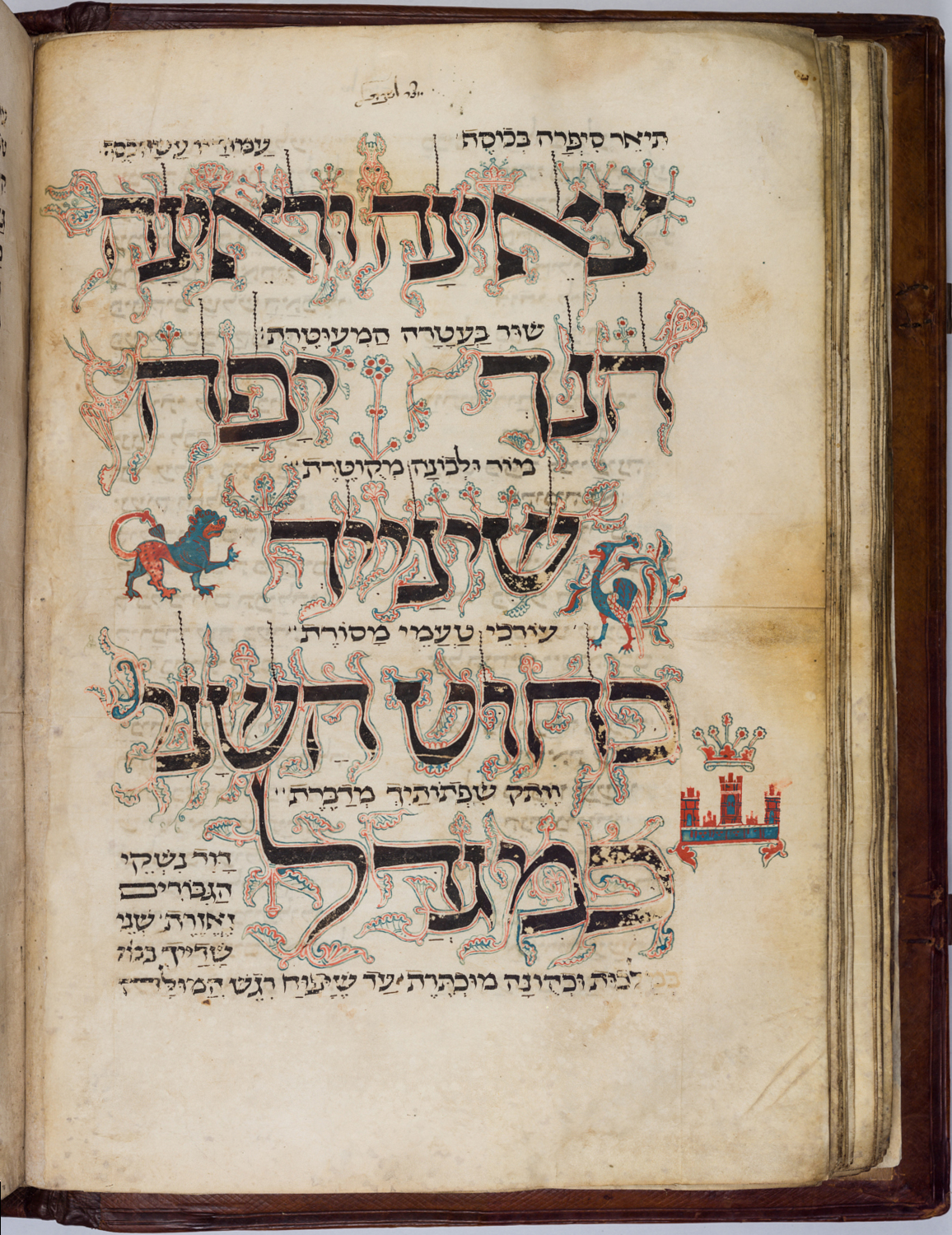
Amsterdam Machzor, written in Cologne c. 1250, is one of the earliest illuminated manuscripts of Ashkenazi origin. Joods Historisch Museum

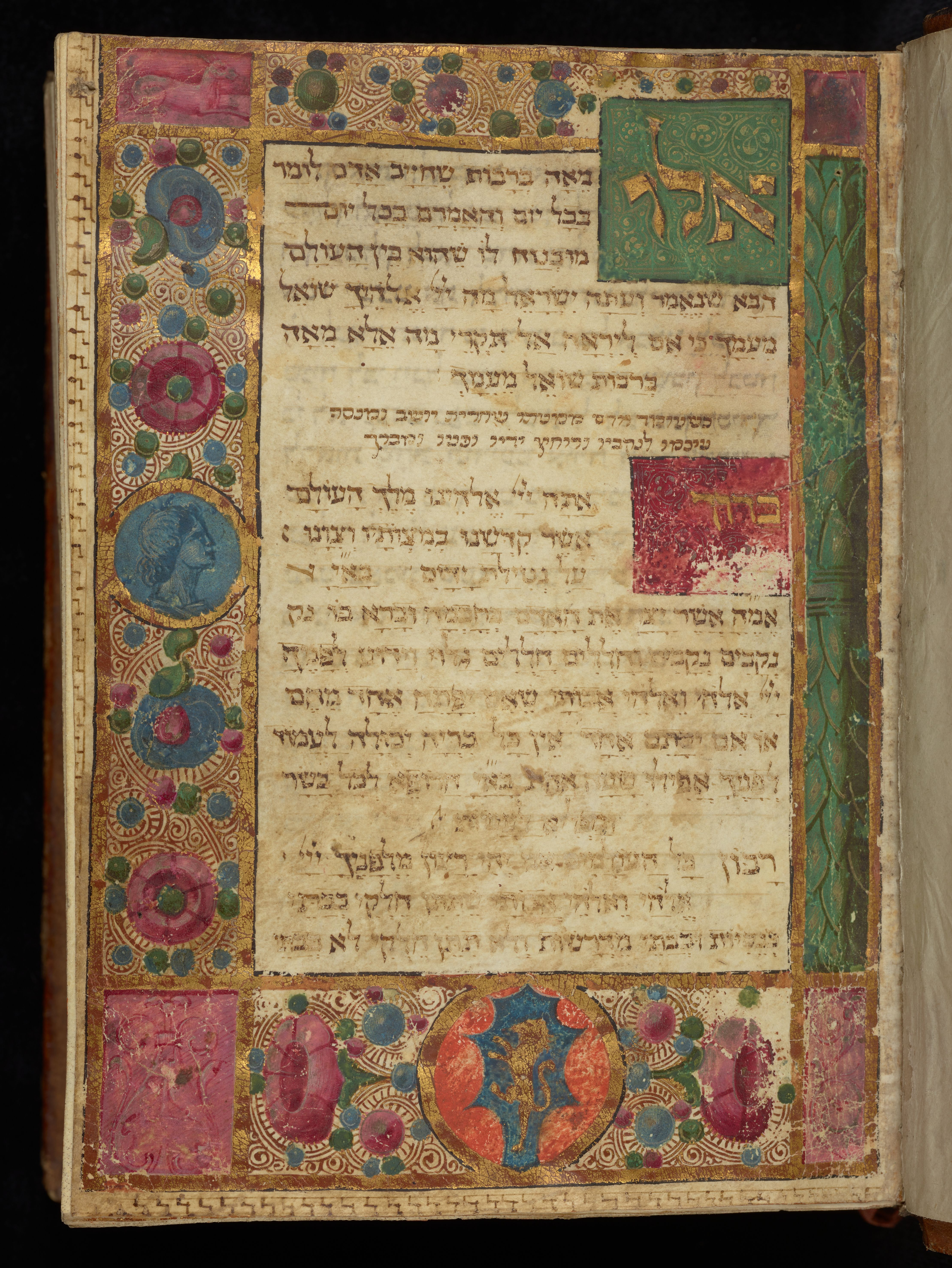
Mahzor written on parchment in Hebrew in an Italian square script and dated to the 14th or 15th century. Chester Beatty Library

The machzor (Hebrew: מחזור, pronounced [maχˈzoʁ], sometimes spelled mahzor, amongst other romanizations; plural: machzorim, [maχzoˈʁim]) is the prayer book which is used by Jews on the High Holy Days of Rosh Hashanah and Yom Kippur. Many Jews also make use of specialized machzorim on the three pilgrimage festivals of Passover, Shavuot, and Sukkot. The machzor is a specialized form of the siddur, which is generally intended for use in weekday and Shabbat services.

The word machzor means "cycle"; the root ח־ז־ר means "to return". The term machzor originally referred to a book containing prayers for the entire year, including weekdays and Shabbat as well as holidays. Later (first in Ashkenazi communities) a distinction developed between the siddur, which included weekday and Shabbat prayers, and the machzor, which included festival prayers. Nevertheless, the original type of Machzor containing all of the prayers for the year continued to be used (even if less common) at least into the 20th century.

== Origins and peculiarities ==
Some of the earliest formal Jewish prayerbooks date from the tenth century; they contain a set order of daily prayers. However, due to the many liturgical differences between the ordinary, day-to-day services and holiday services, the need for a specialized variation of the siddur was recognized by some of the earliest rabbinic authorities, and consequently, the first machzorim were written incorporating these liturgical variations and additions.

The machzor contains not only the basic liturgy, but also many piyyutim, which are liturgical poems specific to the holiday for which the machzor is intended. Many of the prayers in the machzor, including those said daily or weekly on the Sabbath, have special melodies sung only on the holidays. Most machzorim contain only text and no musical notation; the melodies, some of which are ancient, have been passed down orally.

== Popular versions ==
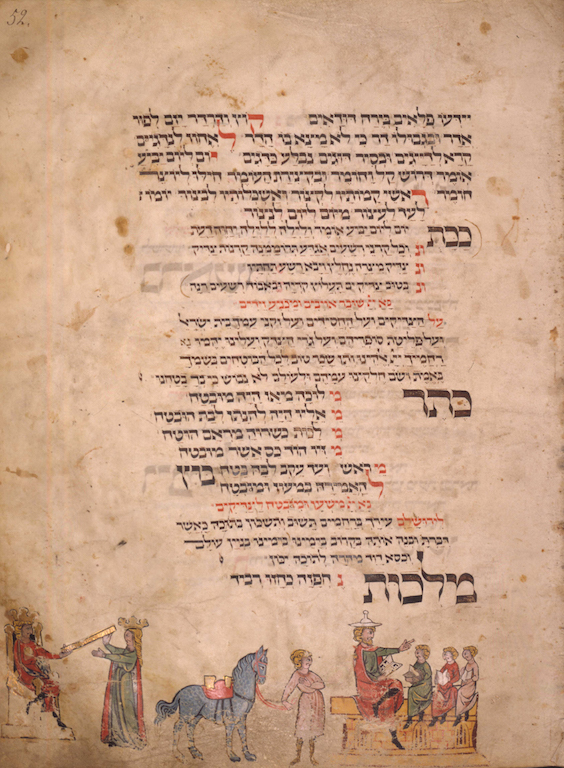
Leipzig Mahzor, 1310

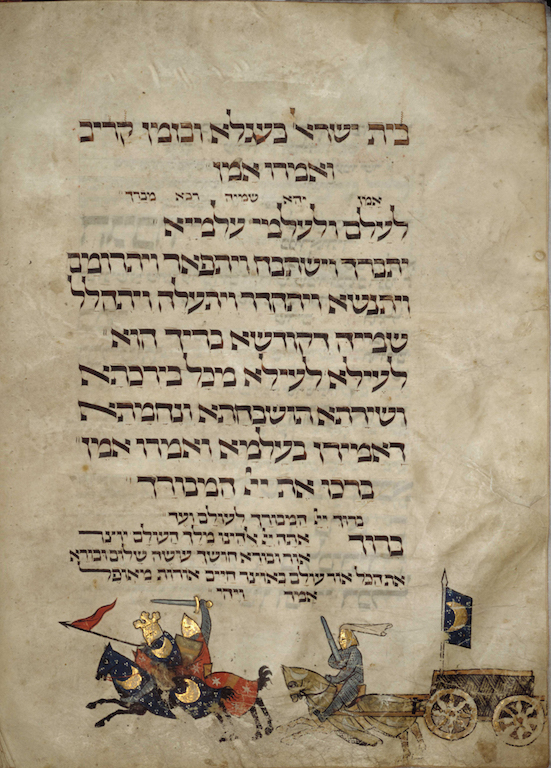
Leipzig Mahzor

- Koren Sacks Machzor Series – A growing body of Hebrew-English holiday prayer books that fuses the translation and commentary of Chief Rabbi Jonathan Sacks with the unique design and layout of Koren Publishers Jerusalem. The liturgy includes a modern English translation and features prayers for the State of Israel, Israel's Defense Forces, Welfare of the Government and the Safety of the American Military Forces. The Koren Sacks Rosh Hashanah machzor was released in 2011 and was named a 2011 National Jewish Book Award finalist by The Jewish Book Council. The Koren Sacks Yom Kippur machzor was released in 2012 and the Koren Sacks Pesah machzor was released in March 2013. The Jewish Press calls the introduction to the Koren Sacks Pesah machzor "a thematic and theological entree to the very essence of Passover." The vast majority of the piyyutim are contained in an appendix in the back of the volume and are not translated.
- ArtScroll Machzor – Very popular machzor published by ArtScroll and used both in the Haredi and Modern Orthodox Jewish community. The text has English translations, commentary, scriptural sources, and choreography (when to sit, stand, bow, etc.) Many versions are available. It contains all of the piyyutim of Minhag Polin (except for Selichot of Shacharit, Musaf and Mincha on Yom Kippur), but some of the piyyutim have been moved to an appendix in the back and do not contain translation.
- Machzor HaShalem: High Holiday Prayerbook – Edited by Philip Birnbaum. This book only went out of print around 2000, after having been used for more than 50 years, well before Koren, Artscroll, and Harlow. Many congregations still pray according to their existing stock of it, particularly in the Modern Orthodox Jewish community, and for a time in some Conservative/Masorti synagogues. The text has English translations, commentary, scriptural sources. It eliminates the vast majority of the piyyutim for the 3 Festivals, and omits some of the piyyutim for the high holidays.
- Rödelheim machzorim - Edited by Wolf Heidenheim, these machzorim first came out in the early 19th century. They were printed hundreds of times, and they are still used in many Yekkish communities. There are versions of the machzor according to the Western Ashkenazic rite, as well as according to Minhag Polin; the former was also published with an English translation.
- Goldschmidt-Fraenkel Machzor - This is an "academic" machzor. It includes piyyutim found only in manuscripts, reconstructs customs of Ashkenazic and French communities in the Middle Ages, and contains critical notes and commentaries on all of the piyyutim. The series currently contains 5 volumes for the five major Festivals Additional volumes for the piyyutim of special Shabbatot in preparation by the Goldschimdt/Fraenkel family.
- Machzor: High Holiday Prayerbook – Edited by Conservative Rabbi Morris Silverman, this book became the de facto Conservative Jewish machzor for 30 years. The text has explanatory notes, meditations, and supplementary readings. It is still in use in some congregations today. Published by the Prayer Book Press.
- Machzor for Rosh Hashanah and Yom Kippur – Edited by Jules Harlow, the official machzor of Conservative Judaism from the early 1970s until 2009. 816 pages. This text has much less commentary and instruction than other machzorim published in the 20th century. The editors focused on the translation, feeling in most places it would be sufficient. It has somewhat fewer poems than other traditional and Conservative machzorim. The translations are more poetic and less literal. In 2009 the Rabbinical Assembly and the United Synagogue of Conservative Judaism announced a new successor volume, Machzor Lev Shalem, intended to replace this edition.
- Machzor Lev Shalem – The new official machzor of the Conservative movement. This prayerbook presents a complete liturgy, restoring many traditional prayers that had not been included in the Silverman or Harlow editions, yet also offers options to use the creative liturgical developments presenting the theology and gender equality of non-Orthodox Judaism. It contains a variety of commentaries from classical and modern-day rabbis, gender-sensitive translations, and choreography instructions (when to sit, stand, bow, etc.). It offers more literal translations of the prayers than previous non-Orthodox machzorim. English transliterations are offered for all prayers and lines recited aloud by the congregation. The page layout surrounds prayers with a variety of English commentaries and readings, as one finds in classical rabbinic commentaries. This book was designed to be used by Conservative, non-denominational and Traditional-Egalitarian synagogues and chavurot, and by leaving out certain texts and choosing the options to be included, it also can be used in Orthodox or Reform congregations.
- Machzor Hadash – A machzor edited by two Conservative rabbis, Sidney Greenberg and Jonathan D. Levine, using gender-neutral translations; it is used by Conservative, non-denominational and Traditional-Egalitarian synagogues and chavurot.
- Kol Haneshama: Prayerbook for the Days of Awe, published by the Reconstructionist Press. This is the official machzor of the Reconstructionist movement.
- Gates of Repentance: The New Union Prayerbook – The official prayerbook of the Reform movement in Judaism from 1978 to 2015. While significantly smaller and less complete than any of the above books, this prayerbook features a wider range of excerpts and selections from the traditional machzor than any other Reform work in the 20th century. It features a rich variety of English commentaries, readings and transliterations. The original version was published in 1978, and a gender-neutral edition was published in 1996. Published by the Central Conference of American Rabbis.
- Days of Awe - the High Holy Days prayer book of the UK Movement for Reform Judaism. Its eighth edition was published in 1985 and the first edition in 1840.
- Machzor Ruach Chadashah – Published by the Union of Liberal and Progressive Synagogues (UK) in 2003.
- Mishkan HaNefesh – This Reform Jewish High Holy Days prayer book was released in 2015; it is intended as a companion to Mishkan T'filah. Mishkan HaNefesh can be translated as "sanctuary of the soul." It includes a version of the High Holy Days prayer Avinu Malkeinu that refers to God as both "Loving Father" and "Compassionate Mother." Other notable changes are replacing a line from the Reform movement's earlier prayerbook, Gates of Repentance, that mentioned the joy of a bride and groom with the line "rejoicing with couples under the chuppah [wedding canopy]", and adding a third, non-gendered option to the way worshippers are called to the Torah, offering mibeit, Hebrew for “from the house of,” in addition to the traditional “son of” or “daughter of.”

== See also ==
- Jewish holidays
- Jewish prayer
- Mahzor of Worms, a thirteenth-century illuminated Machzor
- Simhah ben Samuel of Vitry#Machzor Vitry
