= Michael Sachs (rabbi) =

Prussian rabbi (1808–1864)

Rabbi Michael Sachs
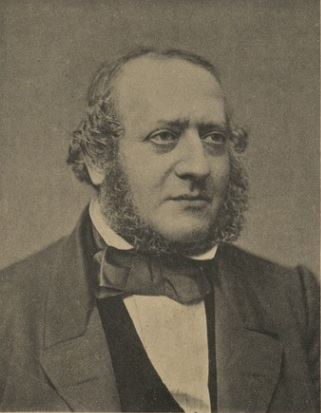
- Michael Sachs

Personal life
- Born: 3 September 1808 Groß-Glogau, Silesia, Prussia
- Died: 31 January 1864 (aged 55) Berlin, Prussia, Germany
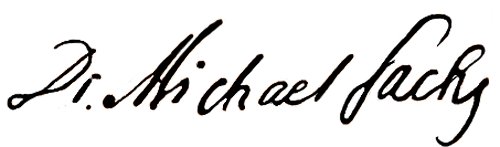
- Signature

Religious life
- Religion: Judaism

Michael Yechiel Sachs (Hebrew: מיכאל יחיאל זַקש; 3 September 1808 – 31 January 1864) was a Prussian rabbi from Groß-Glogau, Silesia.

== Life ==
He was one of the first Jewish graduates from the modern universities, earning a Ph.D. degree in 1836. He was appointed Rabbi in Prague in 1836, and in Berlin in 1844. He took the conservative side against the Reform agitation, and so strongly opposed the introduction of the organ into the Synagogue that he retired from the Rabbinate rather than acquiesce.

Sachs was one of the greatest preachers of his age, and published two volumes of Sermons (Predigten, 1866–1891). He co-operated with Leopold Zunz in a new translation of the Bible. Sachs is best remembered for his work on Hebrew poetry, Religiöse Poesie der Juden in Spanien (1845); his more ambitious critical work (Beiträge zur Sprach- und Alterthumsforschung, 2 vols., 1852–1854) is of less lasting value. He turned his poetic gifts to admirable account in his translation of the Festival Prayers (Machzor, 9 vols., 1855), a new feature of which was the metrical rendering of the medieval Hebrew hymns. Another very popular work by Sachs contains poetic paraphrases of Rabbinic legends (Stimmen vom Jordan und Euphrat, 1853).

== Publications ==
- Sachs, Michael, Die religiöse Poesie der Juden in Spanien, Berlin: Veit, 1845.
- Sachs, Michael, Stimmen vom Jordan und Euphrat: ein Buch fürs Haus, Frankfurt upon Main: Kauffmann, 1891
- Sachs, Michael, Predigten, edited by David Rosin from the bequest of Sachs, Berlin: Gerschel, 1866-1869.
- Sachs, Michael, Beiträge zur Sprach- und Alterthumsforschung: aus jüdischen Quellen: 2 parts, Berlin: Veit, 1852 and 1854.
