= Shulamit Elizur =

Scholar of ancient and medieval Jewish poetry

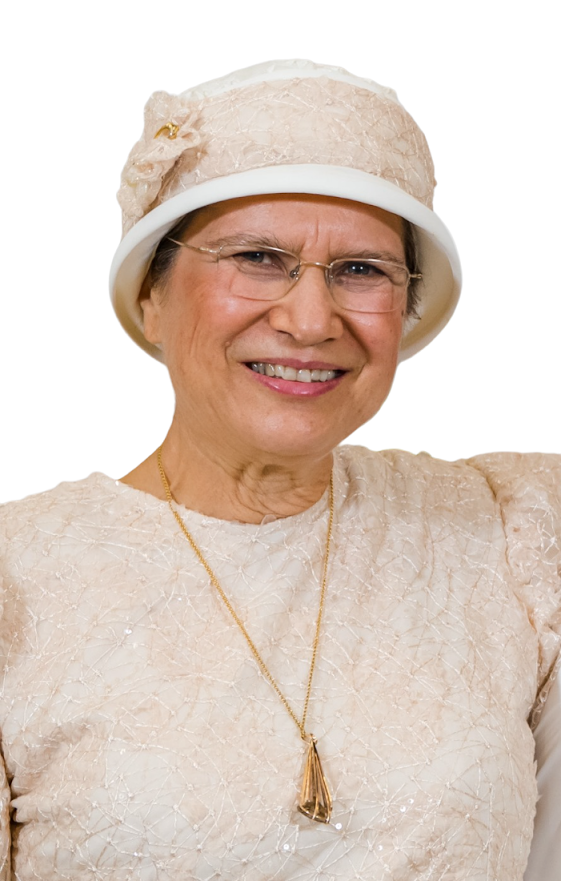
- Born: April 6, 1955; Jerusalem, Israel
- Occupation: Professor of Hebrew literature

Academic background
- Education: Hebrew University of Jerusalem
- Doctoral advisor: Ezra Fleischer

Academic work
- Discipline: Hebrew Literature
- Sub-discipline: ancient and medieval piyyut
- Institutions: Hebrew University of Jerusalem Israel Academy of Sciences and Humanities

Professor Shulamit Elizur (Hebrew: שולמית אליצור), born April 6, 1955, is a scholar of ancient and medieval piyyut (Hebrew poetry). She is the head of the Fleischer Institute for the Study of Hebrew Poetry, a member of the Academy of the Hebrew Language, a member of the editorial board of the Mekize Nirdamim publishing house and a member of the Israel Academy of Sciences and Humanities.

== Early life and education ==
She was born in Jerusalem, to Leah and Meir Hovav. She received her bachelor's degree at the Hebrew University of Jerusalem, in the departments of Hebrew language and Hebrew literature. She then entered directly into a doctoral program under the tutelage of Ezra Fleischer, in which she wrote her dissertation on the piyyutim of a paytan named Eleazar b. Qilar; she proved that this poet was a completely different individual from the famous poet Eleazar b. Qallir ("the Qalliri"). She later published this dissertation, including the full surviving corpus of Eleazar b. Qilar, as a book in 1988.

== Career ==
Elizur has been teaching at the Hebrew University for many years and has published nearly one hundred articles in the field of ancient and medieval piyyut for a scholarly audience. In 1999, she wrote a book for a more general Hebrew-reading audience, A Poem for Every Parashah (שירה של פרשה), for which she won the prestigious Rabbi Kook Prize. She is the only woman ever to receive this prize since it was started in 1943. She has also won the Ben-Zvi Prize.

== Publications ==
In addition to publishing the corpus of R. Eleazar b. Qilar, she has published the work of many other forgotten paytanim of the first- and second-millennium Middle East:

- Binyamin bar Yehuda (Mekize Nirdamim, 1988);
- Yosef Ha-levi ben Khalfun (Magnes Press, 1994);
- Yehoshua bar Khalfa (Yad Ben-Zvi, 1994);
- Pinhas Ha-kohen (World Union of Jewish Studies, 2004);
- and most recently, Yedutun Ha-levi He-haver (in the jubilee volume for Mordecai Akiva Friedman, 2010).

She has also published two volumes (for Rosh Hashanah and Yom Kippur respectively, with other volumes in preparation) of small portions of the immense corpus of Eleazar b. Qallir.

She has also published Sod Meshalshei Kodosh which traces the historical development of the Qedushta genre of Piyyut.
