= Ezra Fleischer =

Romanian-Israeli Hebrew-language poet and philologist

- עזרא פליישר
- Born: 7 August 1928; Timișoara, Romania
- Died: 25 July 2006 (aged 77); Jerusalem, Israel
- Occupations: Hebrew-language poet, philologist
- Known for: Hebrew liturgical poetry, Hebrew philology
- Notable work: Studies on early Hebrew piyyut
- Awards: Israel Prize (1959); Herzl Award (1971); Bialik Prize (1986); Rothschild Prize (1992)

Ezra Fleischer (Hebrew: עזרא פליישר; 7 August 1928 – 25 July 2006) was a Romanian-Israeli Hebrew-language poet and philologist known for his pioneering research on early Hebrew piyyut and medieval Jewish liturgy. Fleischer received the Israel Prize for Literature Studies in 1959 for his contributions to Hebrew poetry and philology.

Born in Timișoara, Romania, Fleischer was active in Hebrew literary circles as a young poet before immigrating to Israel in the 1950s. He later became a professor at the Hebrew University of Jerusalem and headed the Genizah Research Institute, where he produced foundational studies on medieval Hebrew texts and liturgy.

Fleischer’s work is widely credited with reshaping modern scholarship on early Hebrew poetry, and his publications remain central to the study of Jewish liturgy.

== Biography ==
Fleischer was born in 1928 in Timișoara, in the Banat region of western Romania, and studied in the Jewish school that his father, Judah Loeb Fleischer, had founded in 1918.

After World War II, Fleischer was active in the Bnei Akiva movement in Romania and was imprisoned for his Zionist activities. While in prison, he wrote a Hebrew poem entitled Massa Gog (משא גוג), which included a prediction about the downfall of communism. The poem was smuggled out of Romania and published in Israel under a pen name, where it caused somewhat of a "literary sensation". Further books of poetry followed in Romania, all under a pen name.

In 1960, Fleischer emigrated to Israel, where he researched medieval Hebrew literature. He received a doctorate from the Hebrew University of Jerusalem, where he also subsequently lectured until 1997.

He was also the director of the Genizah Research Institute for Hebrew Poetry of the Israel Academy of Sciences and Humanities. His student Shulamit Elizur has succeeded him in this position.

His published work, mostly on poetry and prayer, covers a wide range of ancient and medieval Jewish life from Andalusia and Amsterdam to Syria and Cairo. He also wrote extensively about Judaism's encounter with Islam and Christianity. At the beginning of his career in 1966, Fleischer published a comprehensive and profound critique on Menahem Zulai's book, The paytanic school of Rav Saadia Gaon, wherein Zulai had brought together and summarized his research on Rabbi Saadia Gaon. According to Professor Yosef Tobi, Fleischer occasionally found that there exists a direct influence from Saadia upon Spanish works, such as the integration of philosophical ideas in the liturgical poems composed by Joseph ibn Abitur and Solomon ibn Gabirol, the structure of the Spanish azharot and keter malkhut of Ibn Gabirol, the assignment of biblical verse as a linguistic model in poetry and alternating rhyme scheme (ABAB). However, in all these assertive statements, there is still some ambivalence and uncertainty, seeing that Fleischer is careful to point out that "the secular Hebrew poetry of Spain is not a continuation of pre-Spanish secular poetry, but rather a new formation in terms of its virtues and character: a faithful reflection, in principle, of Arabic secular poetry."

== Awards ==
- In 1959, Fleischer was awarded the Israel Prize, for literature, primarily for his poem Massa Gog.
- In 1971, he was given the Herzl Award for literature.
- In 1986, Fleischer was awarded the Bialik Prize for Jewish thought.
- In 1992, he was awarded the Rothschild Prize, for Jewish studies.

== Festschriften ==
- Ezra Fleischer Memorial Volume, ed. Shulamit Elizur [=Kobez Al Yad, vol. 25 (XXXV)] (Jerusalem: Mekizei Nirdamim, 2017; Hebrew)
- In Memory of Ezra Fleischer, ed. Mordechai Akiva Friedman (Jerusalem: Israel Academy of Sciences and Humanities, 2010; Hebrew)
- Knesset Ezra: Literature and Life in the Synagogue – Studies Presented to Ezra Fleischer, eds. Shulamit Elizur, Moshe David Herr, Gershon Shaked, and Avigdor Shinan (Jerusalem: Ben-Zvi, 1994; Hebrew)

== See also ==
- List of Israel Prize recipients
- List of Bialik Prize recipients
