= Yedid Nefesh =

Jewish liturgical poem

Yedid Nefesh (Hebrew: יְדִיד נֶפֶש, lit. 'beloved of the soul') is the title of a piyyut and zemer (Jewish hymn). It is usually sung on Shabbat.

== Origin ==
This poem is commonly attributed to the sixteenth-century Sephardic kabbalist Rabbi Elazar ben Moshe Azikri (1533–1600), who first published it in Sefer Charedim (published in Venice 1601). Still, Azikri did not claim authorship of it, and there have been other suggested authors (e.g., Judah Halevi or Israel ben Moses Najara). Azikri's philosophy centred around the intense love one must feel for God, a theme evident in this piyyut (see references). The first letters of each of the four verses make up the four-letter name of God, known in English as the tetragrammaton. Various different textual readings appear in contemporary siddurim; the version printed in Siddur Rinat Yisrael and some other siddurim is the text that appears in Sefer Charedim.

== Traditions ==
There is a custom to sing 'Yedid Nefesh' between Mincha (afternoon prayer) on Friday and the beginning of Kabbalat Shabbat (literally: receiving or greeting the Sabbath—a collection of psalms usually sung to welcome in the Shabbat Queen. It is mentioned in the ArtScroll siddur. This custom is believed to have begun in the second half of the 20th century.

It is sung by many Jews during seudah shlishit (the third meal on Shabbat; the first is on Friday night, the second on Saturday lunch, and the third on Saturday before nightfall).

Many Hasidic Jews say or sing it every morning before beginning the pesukei dezimra section of Shacharit in order to arouse their love of God in preparation for the pesukei dezimra in Nusach Sefard siddurim.

== Text ==
The words are as follows:

Transliteration	English translation	Original Hebrew
	Verse 1
Yedid Nefesh av haraḥaman,	Beloved of the soul, the Father of Compassion,	יְדִיד נֶפֶשׁ אַב הָרַחְמָן
meshokh 'avddekha el retzonekha,	draw Your servant to Your Will;	מְשׁוֹךְ עַבְדְּךָ אֶל רְצוֹנֶךָ
yarutz 'avddekha kk'mo ayyal,	Your servant will hurry like a hart	יָרוּץ עַבְדְּךָ כְּמוֹ אַיָּל
yishttaḥave mul hadarekha,	to bow before Your majesty;	יִשְׁתַּחֲוֶה מוּל הֲדָרֶךָ
kee ye'erav lo yedidotekha,	to him Your friendship will be sweeter	כִּי יֶעֱרַב לוֹ יְדִידוֹתֶךָ
minofet tzuf v'khol ṭa'am.	than the dripping of the honeycomb and any taste.	מִנוֹפֶת צוּף וְכָל טָעַם
	Verse 2
Hadur nae ziv ha'ōlam,	Majestic, Beautiful, Radiance of the universe,	הָדוּר נָאֶה זִיו הָעוֹלָם
nafshi ḥolat ahavatekha,	my soul pines [lit: is sick for] for your love.	נַפְשִׁי חוֹלַת אַהֲבָתֶךָ
anna el na refa na lahh,	Please, O God, heal her now	אָנָּא אֵל נָא רְפָא נָא לָהּ
beharot lahh no'am zivakha,	by showing her the pleasantness of Your radiance;	בְּהַרְאוֹת לָהּ נֹעַם זִיוֶךָ
az teetiḥazzeiq v'teetrapei,	then she will be strengthened and healed,	אָז תִּתְחַזֵּק וְתִתְרַפֵּא
v'hayta lahh simḥat 'olam	and eternal gladness will be hers.	וְהָיְתָה לָהּ שִׂמְחַת עוֹלָם
	Verse 3
Vatiq yehemu na raḥamekha,	Enduring One, may Your mercy be aroused	וָתִיק יֶהֱמוּ נָא רַחֲמֶיךָ
v'ḥusah nna 'al bein ahuvekha,	and please take pity on the son of Your beloved,	וְחוּסָה נָּא עַל בֵּן אֲהוּבֶךָ
kee ze kamme nikhsof nikhsaftti,	because it is so very long that I have yearned intensely	כִּי זֶה כַּמֶּה נִכְסוֹף נִכְסַפְתִּי
lir'ot b'teef'eret 'uzekha,	to see speedily the splendour of Your strength;	לִרְאוֹת בְּתִפְאֶרֶת עֻזֶּךָ
anna elleh ḥamedah leebee,	only these my heart desired,	אָנָּא אֵלֶּה חָמְדָה לִבִּי
v'chusa nna v'al tit'allam.	so please take pity and do not conceal Yourself	חוּסָה נָּא וְאַל תִּתְעַלָּם
	Verse 4
Higgale na ufros ḥavivi 'alai,	Please, my Beloved, reveal Yourself and spread upon me	הִגָּלֶה נָא וּפְרוֹשׂ חֲבִיבִי עָלַי
et sukat sh'lomekha,	the shelter of Your peace;	אֶת סֻכַּת שְׁלוֹמֶךָ
ta'eer eretz mikh'vodekha,	illuminate the Earth with Your glory,	תָּאִיר אֶרֶץ מִכְּבוֹדֶךָ
nagila v'nism'cha bakh.	that we may rejoice and be glad with You;	נָגִילָה וְנִשְׂמְחָה בָךְ
Maheir ehov kee va mo'ed,	hasten, show love, for the time has come,	מַהֵר אֱהוֹב כִּי בָא מוֹעֵד
v'ḥonneinu keemei 'olam.	and show us grace as in days of old.	וְחָנֵּנוּ כִּימֵי עוֹלָם

== Notes on the text ==
The text above is the "conventional" text appearing in most Ashkenaz liturgies (including the ArtScroll siddur, with minor changes) down to our day. There have been, over the centuries, many variants in different published prayerbooks. The conventional text differs from the text first printed in 1601, and both the conventional and the 1601 texts differed from Azikri's manuscript (both the manuscript and the 1601 printing were in unvocalized Hebrew).

Verse 3, line 2: בּן אהובך (bein ahuvekha), translated here as "the son of Your beloved" is, in other translations of the same text, rendered as "your beloved son" (or child) or "your loving son". Some Sefardic/Mizrahi prayerbooks rewrite this phrase as עם אהוּבך (am ahuvakh), "your beloved people" (e.g. The Orot Sephardic Shabbat Siddur, ed by Rabbi Eliezer Toledano (1995) p. 571). But the first printing and Azikri's manuscript both have bein ahuvekha.

In 1985, the Rabbinical Assembly of Conservative Judaism included a version of the hymn in Siddur Sim Shalom based on the author’s autograph manuscript, found in the library of the Jewish Theological Seminary. Rabbi Azikri's manuscript of this song (viewable on opensiddur.org) varies in several spots from the conventional text. The Hebrew and English text used in the Koren Sacks Siddur (2009) followed this manuscript—although the Authorised Daily Prayer Book (4th ed. 2006, pages 576–577) translated and annotated by Jonathan Sacks used the conventional printed text. The significant changes include: Verse 2, line 6, שׁפחת shifḥat 'your maidservant' replacing simḥat 'gladness, joy', and the pronoun "her" with "your", so the line would read "She will be your maidservant for eternity," mirroring the phrasing in Deuteronomy 15:17, והיה לך עבד עולם 'he will be your slave forever', but in feminine. This was also the reading found in the first publication in 1601 and in Siddur Sim Shalom.

Verse 3, line 4, both the manuscript and first printing omit m'heirah 'speedily', but in line 6 חוּשׁה ḥushah 'hasten' in the manuscript and 1601 publication was replaced in the later printings by v'ḥusah 'take pity'.

Verse 3, line 5, both the manuscript and the 1601 printing had אנא אלי An[n]a Eli instead of Eileh, so the line changes from "These are my heart's desire" to "Please, My God, [You are] my heart's desire". So the manuscript says, for verse 3 lines 4 & 5, "O, my Lord, [You who are] my heart's desire, hurry please." But the conventional printings (such as ArtScroll) have it, "My heart desired only these, so please have pity."

The 1601 printing indicated that the last line of each verse (in the printing above, the fifth and sixth lines of each verse) was to be repeated. Jacobson mentions an earlier (apparently circa 1870) prayerbook that similarly attempted to restore the text according to the 1601 printing, which met with such condemnation (mostly over the substitution of "maidservant" for "gladness", though both the 1601 printing and Azikri's manuscript support this) from influential Hasidic rabbis that the editor was forced to print replacement pages with the conventional (if erroneous) text.

Azikri's handwritten manuscript of this poem was discovered by Meir Benayahu in the library of Jewish Theological Seminary of America in the mid-20th century. As a result, the siddur Rinat Yisrael (Ashkenaz ed. by Rabbi Shlomo Tal, 1977), p. 189, the Koren-Sacks, and the Siddur Sim Shalom, used the same Hebrew text as the handwritten original. In a subsequent commentary to his prayerbook, Rabbi Tal published a photocopy of that handwritten original (Tal, Ha-Siddur Be-histalsheluto, 1984, page 68). Tal also noted that a few earlier prayerbooks (Livorno 1910 and Jerusalem 1953) also printed versions that restored "maidservant" from the 1601 edition.
