= Seudah shlishit =

Third meal eaten on the Shabbat

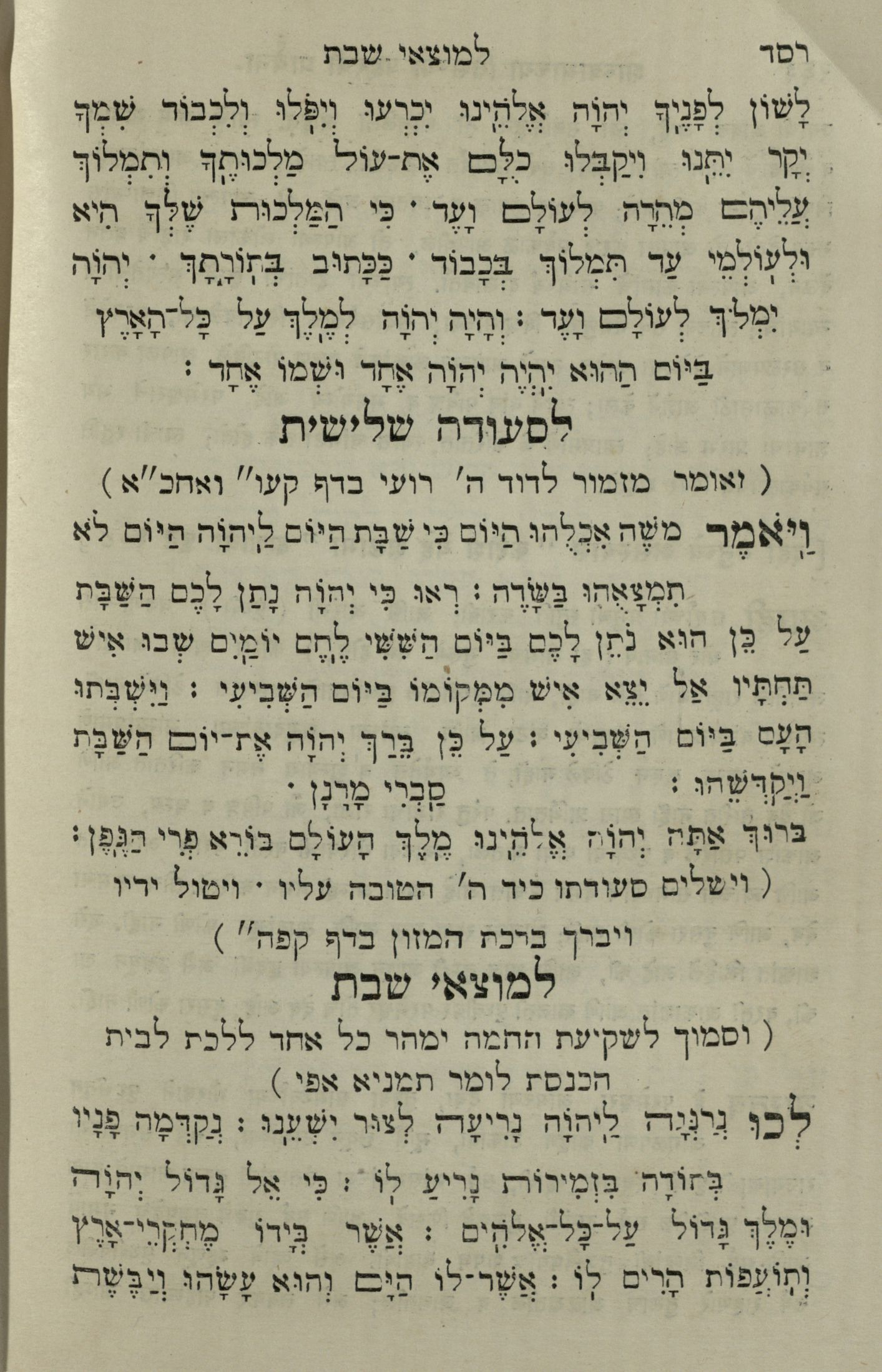
Jewish Prayer Book (Siddur) in Hebrew, including the blessing for Seudah shlishit

Seudah shlishit (Hebrew: סעודה שלישית, romanized: səʿuḏah šəlišiṯ third meal) or shaleshudes (Yiddish, an elided form of Hebrew: שָׁלֹשׁ סְעֻדוֹת, romanized: šāloš sǝʿuḏot, lit. 'three meals') is the third meal customarily eaten by Sabbath-observing Jews on each Shabbat. Jews are obligated to eat three meals on Shabbat according to the Talmud, and the seudah shlishit/shaleshudes is that third meal, eaten before the Sabbath ends at nightfall. The practice of eating three meals is homiletically attached to Ex. 16:25, in which the word for day, hayom, appears three times with reference to the manna that fell in a double portion on Friday.

== Practices ==
According to Jewish law (Halakha), the meal is to be eaten in the afternoon. It is usually the smallest of the three meals, often consisting of foods such as salads, herring, and gefilte fish in Ashkenazi custom and tuna, harissa, and fruits in Mizrahi and Sephardi customs. According to the Arba'ah Turim, it is also to be eaten on Jewish holidays.

It has special significance because it is a mitzvah ("commandment") to eat three meals on the Sabbath. In Hasidic communities, this mitzvah is carried out with great enthusiasm as the Hitveadut. In some Hasidic circles, this third meal continues hours after the Sabbath has officially ended concluding with Birkat HaMazon over the same cup with Havdalah giving rise to the tradition of Melaveh Malkah. The lights might be turned off, either by a timer, or by a person after the Sabbath has ended. Some have a custom to rise and "accept the Kingdom of Heaven", by reciting Ein Kamocha ("The Lord is King, the Lord was King, the Lord will always be King") and the Shema Yisrael.

While most poskim (Jewish legal decisors) encourage people to eat bread at this meal, most agree that eating cake or fruit will minimally suffice. However, many Jews of the Hasidic Chabad community have a custom specifically to refrain from eating bread at this meal, as do some German Jews.

Special Sabbath songs that are often sung at this meal include Bnei Heichala (a Kabbalistic hymn by Rabbi Isaac Luria), Mizmor L'David (23rd Psalm), and Yedid Nefesh (a piyyut, or liturgical poem, composed by 16th century Kabbalist rabbi Elazar ben Moshe Azikri). Some also finish the morning hymn Baruch Adonai Yom Yom, starting either from the words B'vo'o M'Edom or Y'tzaveh Tzur Chasdo. Many recite the "Acceptance of the Kingdom of Heaven" before the last verse of this hymn. Some sing other Sabbath morning hymns, and some Kabbalistic hymns for the third meal, such as Kel Mistater. During the meals from Passover until Rosh Hashanah, many recite Pirkei Avot during the meal, one or two chapters per week, so as to finish three times.

Although according to some opinions one is required to recite kiddush at this meal, most say it is not necessary. However, some have either maintained the recitation of kiddush as a custom, or merely partake of some wine or grape juice in order to recite the blessing, but do not consider it as the recitation of kiddush. Others have no particular custom as to the partaking of wine or grape juice at this meal.

== Shabbat meals ==
The Talmud (tractate Shabbat 117b) states that a Jew must eat three meals on the Sabbath day, based on a derivation from a Biblical passage referring to Shabbat. Some rabbinic commentators conjecture that this three meal requirement was instituted in order to lend a special measure of honor to Shabbat, since the normative practice at the time was to eat two meals in the course of a normal weekday: one during the day and one at night.

Later rabbinic sources list great spiritual rewards for eating this third meal and state that it is equivalent to all the meals combined. Indeed, while sometimes called seudah shlishit, or "third meal," it is often called shalosh seudos, "three meals" for its significance.

While not described as a required act, it has become common practice today. In commemoration of the double portion of manna that fell for Shabbat, it is customary to have two loaves of bread at each meal. Among European Jewry this bread often takes the form of challah, while Middle Eastern Jews and Sephardi Jews normally use their own traditional breads or regional breads. Some Ashkenazi Jews will eat Matza.

== See also ==
- Shabbat meals
- Seudat mitzvah
- Melaveh Malkah
