= C. Peter R. Gossels =

American attorney (1930–2019)

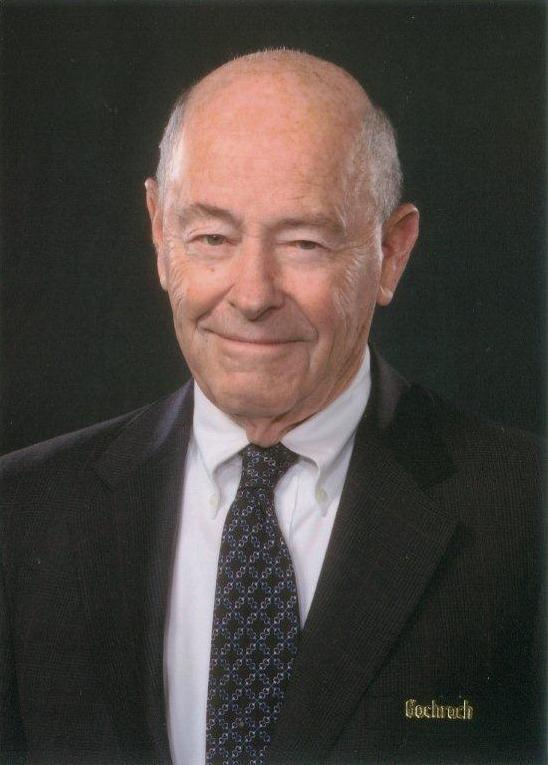
- Born: August 11, 1930; Berlin, Germany
- Died: October 25, 2019 (aged 89); Newton, MA
- Occupation: Attorney
- Employer: Weston Patrick
- Spouse: Nancy Lee Tuber
- Children: 3

C. Peter R. Gossels (August 11, 1930 – October 25, 2019) was an attorney practicing in Massachusetts. He was a contributor to professional journals and co-editor of a number of Jewish prayer books, including Vetaher Libenu, the first siddur to use nonsexist, inclusive language, published in 1980.

== Early life ==
Gossels was born in Berlin, Germany on August 11, 1930. He and his younger brother, Werner F. Gossels, were sent to France by their mother, Charlotte Lewy Gossels, and were placed at the Chateau de Chabannes in the Creuse in 1941 by Oeuvre de Secours aux Enfants in Creuse. The boys were given visas through the American Friends Service Committee who worked with the American Jewish Joint Distribution Committee to bring them to the United States in September 1941. Gossels was featured in the 2001 Emmy-winning film, Children of Chabannes, produced and directed by his daughter, Lisa R. Gossels. The documentary tells the story of how the people of Chabannes, a small village in occupied France, saved the lives of 400 Jewish refugee children, including the two Gossels boys.

== Career ==
Gossels attended Boston Latin School before graduating from Harvard College and Harvard Law School. He served in the United States Army from October 1954 until July 1956.

Gossels moved to Wayland, Massachusetts in 1961. After serving as a member of the Finance Committee of the Town of Wayland, Massachusetts between 1966 and 1968, and as Wayland's Town Counsel for eleven years, Gossels was elected Moderator of the Town of Wayland in 1982. He served as moderator until 2011. During this time, he implemented the first system of electronic voting to be used at New England town meeting.

=== Legal career ===
He was admitted to the Massachusetts Bar in 1955, the U.S. District Court, District of Massachusetts in 1957, the U.S. Court of Appeals, First Circuit in 1957, and the Supreme Court of the United States in 1965. Gossels first law firm position was with Sullivan and Worcester as a trial lawyer. In 1965, Gossels became a partner in the firm of Zelman, Gossels and Alexander. Gossels served as Chair of the Section on International Legal Practice of the Boston Bar Association between 1962 and 1967. In that capacity, he organized and produced The New England Conference on Legal Problems of Doing Business Abroad, which attracted large audiences each year. In 1970, he worked with Michael Dukakis, soon-to-be Governor of Massachusetts, to create and enact the first system of no-fault automobile insurance protection in the United States. Gossels joined the Boston law firm of Weston Patrick in 1972.

He co-authored the report of the Boston Bar Association Work Group on cost and time efficiencies in the Massachusetts courts in 2005. Gossels published articles in the Boston Bar Journal and Massachusetts Lawyers Weekly.

Gossels served as Chair of the Fee Disputes Committee of the Boston Bar Association from 2000 to 2010, and as a hearing officer for the Massachusetts Board of Bar Overseers from 2006 to 2012. He earned the highest “A.V.” rating from the publishers of the Martindale Hubbell Law Directory.

== Other activities ==
From 1998, Gossels hosted an annual two-hour cable television program in Wayland, Massachusetts, “Ask the Candidates – Live!” which allowed voters to ask questions to public office candidates in Wayland, Massachusetts. Gossels was included among Boston's Top Rated Lawyers, according to the Boston Globe 2012 and 2014 ratings.

Gossels served on the National Commission on Worship of the Union for Reform Judaism between 1976 and 1981.

While serving as president of Congregation Beth El of the Sudbury River Valley in Sudbury, Massachusetts (1977–1979), Gossels served as co-editor with his wife Nancy Lee Gossels and Joan S. Kaye of the first egalitarian Jewish prayer book (or siddur) Vetaher Libenu published in 1980. The book featured nonsexist, inclusive language and revised the traditional Hebrew translation of "Barukh atah Adonai Eloheinu, melekh ha'olam," or "Praised are You, Adonai our God, Ruler to the Universe," to "Holy One of Blessing, Your Presence Fills Creation." Gossels also served as co-editor of Chadesh Yamenu an egalitarian machzor for Rosh HaShana (1997) and Canfay HaShachar (2003), a siddur for weekday morning prayers.

In May 2019, Gossels travelled to Berlin together with 11 family members to unveil the Silent Bell Board, a memorial plaque for 83 former Jewish residents, in front of the house once owned by his grandparents Lewy and also his home between 1936 and 1939 at 35 Käthe-Niederkirchner-Straße (formerly Lippehner Straße). On October 15, 2019 he also spoke about this during the event “Neighbors through Time: Lippehner 35 - the Forgotten History of a Berlin House” at Brandeis University, together with Simon Lütgemeyer, an architect and current resident of that building who had created the plaque following his research.

In September 2019 Gossels published the book "Letters From Our Mother". It "contains the letters that the author’s mother, Charlotte Lewy Gossels, had written to her two young sons in France after she had worked for a year to obtain visas from the French government to help them escape from Nazi Germany in 1939. Unable to obtain a visa for herself, she was deported to Auschwitz from Berlin early in 1942. The book describes the fate of the brothers’ family, how the children managed to survive the defeat of the French army by the German invaders, who occupied France, the care they received from Oeuvre de Secours aux Enfants and their rescue by members of the American Friends Service Committee, who obtained visas for these Jewish brothers to come to the United States in 1941. The book tells the story of the education these young German refugees received, their marriages, the families they created and the contributions they made to their American communities and society. It is the story of the two young immigrants, who fled for their lives . . . and it is the story of America." (Amazon).
