= Morris Silverman =

American rabbi and author

Morris Silverman (1894–1972) was a Conservative rabbi and writer.

== Biography ==
Silverman was born on November 19, 1894, in Newburgh, New York, the son of Lena (née Friedland) and Simon Silverman, who were Russian Jewish immigrants. He edited the High Holiday Prayer Book, popularly known as the "Silverman Machzor" in 1939, which became the official prayer book for Rosh Hashanah and Yom Kippur for the United Synagogue of America, the institutional arm of the Conservative movement in the U.S., for over half a century. He published it through his publishing company, Prayer Book Press, now a subsidiary of Media Judaica.

Silverman edited the Sabbath and Festival Prayer Book, which was the official prayer book for the Conservative movement until the late 1980s.

Silverman's primary literary output was liturgical books, many of which he co-wrote with his son, Rabbi Hillel E. Silverman, including Siddurenu, a prayer book for school children, a prayer book for summer camps, and a haggadah for the Passover Seder.

Silverman was the long-time rabbi of the Emanuel Synagogue, a Conservative synagogue in West Hartford, Connecticut.

He came from a family of Jewish clergy and writers. His wife, Althea H. (née Osber), wrote many children's books, and his son, Hillel, also a rabbi, is an author.. His grandson is actor Jonathan Silverman. His great-nephew, Richard Sillman, was perhaps the youngest (among the first pioneers) cable TV directors in the United States.

== Awards ==
Silverman was a 1953 recipient of the George Washington Honor Medal from Freedoms Foundation at Valley Forge for Editorial.
