= Melaveh Malkah =

Meal customarily held by Jews after Shabbat

Melaveh Malkah (also, Melave Malka or Melava Malka) (Hebrew: מלווה מלכּה, lit. "Escorting the Queen") is the name of a meal that, as per Halakha, is customarily held by Jews after the Sabbath (Shabbat), in other words, on Saturday evening. The intent of the meal is to figuratively escort the "Sabbath Queen" (the traditional metaphor for Shabbat in Jewish liturgy) on her way out via musical performances, singing and eating, as one would escort a monarch upon his departure from a city. This meal is alternatively called "the fourth meal."

== Sources ==
The source for the custom is found in the Babylonian Talmud:

A man shall always set his table after Shabbat — even though he needs but a ke'zayit of chamin [meaning, even though he is quite full and satisfied.

This custom is also referred to as Se'udata d'David Malka Meshicha (Aramaic: סעודתא דדוד מלכא משיחא), "The meal of David, King Messiah." King David asked God when he would die and God revealed to him that he would die on a Shabbat. From that time on, David made a meal for the members of his household at the conclusion of each Shabbat to thank God that he was still alive.

== Kabbalistic reasons ==
According to the Yaakov Chaim Sofer, the luz bone — which is located at the base of the skull where the knot of the head tefillin is placed, and which God will use to "reconstruct" a person at the time of the resurrection of the dead — is nourished solely from the meal of Melaveh Malkah (Kaf Hachayim 300:1-2).

Rabbi Isaac Luria is claimed to have said that the 'additional soul' (Hebrew: נשמה יתרה) which is given to each Jew for the duration of each Shabbat does not leave a person until after the Melaveh Malkah. For this reason, many people refrain from work and remain in their Shabbat clothes until after Melaveh Malkah.

The eating of the Melaveh Malkah meal is said to be a segula for easy childbirth, as well as for injecting blessings of health, wealth and spiritual gain into the following week.

== Conducting the meal ==
Melaveh Malkah is a mitzvah that is incumbent on both men and women. After the conclusion of Shabbat and the saying of Havdalah, a fresh tablecloth is spread and candles are lit for the meal of Melaveh Malkah. The meal should be eaten as close to the end of Shabbat as possible, although in cases of need one may delay it until later, but preferably no later than midnight. Some Hasidic rebbes would eat Melaveh Malkah on Sunday morning, but they would make sure to eat some food on Saturday night.

Ideally, only food that was specifically prepared for the Melaveh Malkah meal should be served, rather than leftovers from Shabbat. One may fulfill the mitzvah by eating as little as a ke'zayit of bread. Some say that if one is not hungry, he may fulfill the custom of Melaveh Malkah by drinking a cup of fresh-brewed tea or coffee, or by eating a piece of cake or fruit.

Those seeking to beautify the mitzvah prepare a special dish for this meal. The Talmud tells of the household of Rabbi Abbahu, in which they would slaughter a calf at the conclusion of each Shabbat and Rabbi Abbahu would eat one of its kidneys. When his son grew up, he asked why an additional calf had to be slaughtered after Shabbat especially for the Melaveh Malkah, when they could instead save the kidney from the calf that they regularly slaughtered for their Shabbat meals? His advice was well taken, and a bit of the Shabbat meat was set aside for the Melaveh Malkah. But then a lion came and devoured the calf, so that nothing was gained by the suggestion. This story appears in the Talmud to show that it is proper to beautify the mitzvah by preparing a special dish in honor of the Melaveh Malkah meal, and to not be satisfied with eating leftovers from the Shabbat foods.

Special songs have been composed for singing at this meal, the most popular of which welcomes the coming of the Prophet Elijah, who will announce the advent of the Messianic age.

Melaveh Malkah has become a popular venue for Saturday-night get-togethers among friends and larger group social events. Many Jewish organizations hold Melaveh Malkahs for hundreds of guests as a fundraising event.

== See also ==
- Shabbat meals
- Seudah shlishit
- Seudat Chiyat HaMatim
- Seudat mitzvah
