= Mishkan T'filah =

Jewish prayer book

Mishkan T'filah משכן תפלה
- Mishkan T'Filah Hardcover Edition
- Language: English and Hebrew
- Genre: Prayer Book
- Publisher: Central Conference of American Rabbis
- Publication date: 2007
- Pages: 712 (Shabbat, Weekdays + Festivals Edition)
- Preceded by: Gates of Prayer, the New Union Prayer Book

Mishkan T'filah—A Reform Siddur is a prayer book prepared for Reform Jewish congregations around the world by the Central Conference of American Rabbis (CCAR). Mishkan T'filah (משכן תפלה) is Hebrew for "Dwelling Place for Prayer" and the book serves as a successor to Gates of Prayer, the New Union Prayer Book (GOP), which was released in 1975. In 2015, CCAR released the complementary Mishkan HaNefesh machzor for the High Holy Days. CCAR also produces a host of print and electronic materials to supplement the Mishkan T'filah book.

== Development ==
=== Problems with Gates of Prayer ===
Gates of Prayer was criticized as being a non-cohesive collection of prayers, resulting in a prayer book that was too large, and for its retention of masculine pronouns. To address these issues, some congregations prepared their own prayer materials (often with edits to neutralize gender) or continued use of the Union Prayer Book.

A project to address these concerns and increase the poeticism of a future prayerbook was initiated in 1981. Israeli poet T. Carmi was brought in to provide guidance on post-biblical Hebrew texts that could be incorporated into the Reform liturgy. The "Carmi Project" generated hundreds of possibilities, many of which would later be integrated into Mishkan T'filah.

=== Proposals for new design ===
A three-year study called "Lay Involvement and Liturgical Change" started in 1985 as part of an effort to better understand the changing spiritual needs of Reform worshipers. Diverse groups of volunteers were asked to keep journals regarding their experiences in prayer services as part of gaining insights into what worked well in the existing GOP prayer book, to prepare standards for evaluating new options and to start preparations for creating a revised siddur. The research found that the themed services touted as a benefit of the GOP did not meet the needs of all worshipers in aiming too narrowly at one group within the congregation and that the traditional responsive readings were found to limit participation. Feedback showed that congregants wanted accurate and meaningful translations of prayers, accompanied by a transliteration and commentaries that would provide additional insights into the text without distracting from it.

=== Winning design ===
The CCAR received 18 submissions in response to requests for proposals to meet the standards specified based on the input gathered. Two proposals were selected, with one from Rabbi Elyse Frishman of the Barnert Temple in Franklin Lakes, New Jersey, who was able to provide insight on Jewish texts on liturgy and worship, who was named to serve as editor of the new siddur. In Frishman's concept, each pair of pages would feature the Hebrew text with a translation and transliteration on the right page and additional readings on the left from such authors as Yehuda Amichai and Langston Hughes.

This would allow those seeking a more traditional God-centric prayer service to stay on the right side of the book, while others could choose to focus on readings and meditative style poetry on the left. All would conclude with a common chatimah, a one-line conclusion, before moving on to the next page.

In an interview with The Times of Israel, Frishman noted changing religious and political feelings within Reform Jewish communities including an increased emphasis on social justice. With the prayer book, one of the greatest challenges was finding "a balance between wanting to embrace anyone and everyone who walks through our doors and making our worship service distinctly Jewish."

Judith Abrams, who submitted a second proposal and who provided expertise in rabbinic source materials, was named as consulting editor, and Rabbi Peter Knobel chaired the editorial committee.

=== Testing and distribution ===
Galley proof copies were sent to 300 congregations for three years of field testing, with thousands of recommendations made for improving the original work. By 2006, pre-sales of the new prayer book were over 75,000 copies.

== Modifications ==
Page 6, an example of the style commonly found on the book's right hand side.

Following a trend amongst newer schoolbooks and many other designs, Mishkan T'filah makes extensive use of white space. The book also uses large and colored fonts to emphasize important information or the start of a prayer. In the top corner, a navigation guide uses bold to show what prayer one is turned to and how far along this is in the service. This appears in English translation or transliteration on the left-hand pages.

While the increased use of Hebrew shows a trend toward the traditional content of the siddur, Mishkan T'filah's modifications include the elimination of references to God in the masculine pronoun "He". Mentions of the Patriarchs, Abraham, Isaac and Jacob are paired with the Matriarchs, Sarah (wife of Abraham), Rebecca (wife of Isaac), and Rachel and Leah (the wives of Jacob). As in traditional Hebrew texts, Mishkan T'filah reads from right cover to left, a format that was available only as an option in Gates of Prayer.

Musical changes included an increase in combined English and Hebrew tunes. The book includes many songs from the Jewish singer Debbie Friedman.

Rabbi Lawrence A. Hoffman characterized Gates of Prayer as characteristic of a service economy, offering many different choices for individual theological preferences; Its multiple service selections could meet each person's need, but only one could be used for a particular service. By contrast, Mishkan T'filah offers multiple options on the same page, allowing differing perspectives on prayer to be accommodated simultaneously.

Mishkan T'filah includes the Prayer for the Welfare of the State of Israel.

== Other editions ==
=== Youth and Children's Editions ===
CCAR publishes the children’s edition of Mishkan T’fillah—aimed at the kindergarten through second grade demographic. It includes many illustrations and prayers for Shabbat, the Torah, and weekdays.

The youth edition is intended for grades 3–5 and their families. It also includes illustrations but the prayers and readings are more comprehensive. The youth edition contains all the major prayers for a Shabbos Bar/Bat Mitzvah service. It also has sections for festival prayers, blessings for life, and a Jewish song appendix. Notes are provided at the bottom of many pages to guide the Hebrew learning process. Gates of Prayer, Mishkan T'filah's predecessor, also featured children and youth variants.

=== World Union ===
A World Union for Progressive Judaism edition of Mishkan T'filah was developed and published in 2010. It reflects the more traditional approach often taken by English-speaking Progressive Jewish communities outside the United States of America.

This edition of Mishkan T'filah is also sensitive to the experiences of Jews living in the Southern Hemisphere (particularly Australia, New Zealand and South Africa) where traditional liturgical seasonal references relating to the Land of Israel are out of step with local weather cycles.

The World Union edition was edited by a team led by Rabbi Jonathan Keren-Black from the Leo Baeck Centre for Progressive Judaism in Kew East, Victoria, Australia

=== Pulpit Edition ===
The pulpit edition comes in a jumbo sized 3-ring binder and is designed for conducting or preparing services. Sheet music and audio files for Mishkan T'filah can be found on the URJ owned Transcontinental Music Partners Store. Unlike the High Holy Day Shirei Mishkan HaNefesh song book, there is no formal book of musical accompaniments for Mishkan T'fillah.

=== Travelers Edition ===
The Union for Reform Judaism released an edition for those who travel. This compact, paperback version Mishkan T'filah integrates weekday and Shabbat services into an easily transportable volume while still remaining faithful to the style and spirit of Mishkan T'filah. Also includes Festival liturgy. A similar compact edition, Mishkan T'filah for Gatherings is also sold or may be rented from the CCAR.

=== Journal edition ===
The journal edition is stylized like a marble notebook but still keeps most content of the standard version. Additionally, it has thought provoking writing prompts and some blank pages for readers to create their own verses.

=== Mishkan T’Filah for the House in Mourning ===
This noticeably shortened edition of Mishkan T'filah is designed for conducting a memorial service. Rather than borrowing copies of standard prayer books from the pews, many synagogues maintain a dedicated set of memorial service books, such as this edition, which are managed by a member of a caring committee. The books are then temporarily taken to the home of whoever is in mourning for shiva services.

=== Non-Transliterated ===
A version of the book omitting transliterations from Hebrew to English is available and comes in a different color cover. This version is commonly used in religious schools where there is a desire for bar and bat mitzvah students to become comfortable reading the Hebrew alphabet. The edition still contains most English passages and translations,

=== Large Print and Braille ===
For people with visual impairments, a large print edition of the book was put out. A braille version was also released although its production was delayed slightly after Jewish charity that was originally going to work on the project had a funding shortfall. The braille edition was eventually created by a different organization.

== Electronic supplements ==
=== EBook and Apps ===
In recognition of the digital age, CCAR Press has made Mishkan T'filah available for purchase as an ebook. Most versions can be found on the stores of Apple iBooks, Amazon Kindle, B&N Nook, and Google Play Books. CCAR also released the iT'filah app for iOS and Android devices however this was subsequently reorganized into a series of apps.

=== Visual T'filah ===
For congregations, the Visual T’filah™ computer program was developed to offer a more engaging screen companion in prayer services. Visual T’filah is also available in children and holiday editions. To assist in deployment of the Mishkan T'filah product line, CCAR offers webinars.

=== Significance and criticism ===
Compared with other religions or branches of Judaism, the Reform movement is notable in its embrace of technology. For example, while nearly all Orthodox congregations have websites and some social media presence, Orthodox and Conservative leaders would seldom encourage their members to read Shabbat prayers off a mobile app due to the traditional interpretation of Jewish law prohibiting lighting fires on Shabbat or holidays to extend to anything involving electricity (which could inadvertently create a spark). But in line with more progressive views towards Shabbat observance in the Reform movement, CCAR does publish an eBook version of Miskan T'filah presumably to be used on Shabbat or holidays. Likewise, many congregations use the Visual T’filah slideshow program in their sanctuaries during Shabbatot or holidays.

According to Oren Golan, author of Digital Judaism: Jewish Negotiations with Digital Media and Culture, Reform Judaism “has cultivated an open approach towards modernity that consists of an integration of new media into the everyday practices of believers and clergy.” While this breaks with traditional norms, it has allowed the movement to reach a broader audience and “validate (the digital consumers') sense of belonging to a Jewish community.”

In a review of Mishkan T'filah for an Interfaith Families blog, Rabbi Adam Morris stated "I can sincerely say that it is a helpful and useful road map during a Shabbat service." However, in an allusion to the significant demographic and cultural changes affecting organized religion in the United States, Morris went on to argue it will take more than a nice book to get the Reform movement "toward the next paradigm."

== Companion books ==
=== Mishkan HaNefesh ===
In 2015 the High Holy Days prayer book Mishkan HaNefesh was released; it is intended as a companion to Mishkan T'filah. Mishkan HaNefesh can be translated as "sanctuary of the soul." It includes a version of the High Holy Days prayer Avinu Malkeinu that refers to God as both "Loving Father" and "Compassionate Mother." Other notable changes are replacing a line from the Reform movement’s earlier prayerbook, "Gates of Repentance," that mentioned the joy of a bride and groom specifically, with the line "rejoicing with couples under the chuppah [wedding canopy]", and adding a third, non-gendered option to the way worshippers are called to the Torah, offering “mibeit,” Hebrew for “from the house of,” in addition to the traditional “son of” or “daughter of.” Several other versions of Mishkan HaNefesh (ex. youth, large print...) have also been put out.

=== Mishkan HaLev ===
Mishkan HaLev is the official prayer book for the Hebrew month of Elul. Elul coincides with August and September and is considered a time of preparation for the High Holy Days. This book features services for Erev Shabbat during Elul and Selichot.

=== Divrei Mishkan T'filah: Delving into the Siddur ===
This 280-page book published in 2018 serves as a commentary to Mishkan T’filah. It contains essays from Rabbi Richard Sarason, PhD, which seek to explore the history, significance, and challenges to prayer within and outside the Mishkan T'filah service. A similar guide to the machzor, Divrei Mishkan HaNefesh was also published.
