= Seudat mitzvah =

Obligatory festive meal

A seudat mitzvah (Hebrew: סעודת מצוה, "commanded meal"), in Judaism, is an obligatory festive meal, usually referring to the celebratory meal following the fulfillment of a mitzvah (commandment), such as a bar mitzvah, bat mitzvah, a wedding, a brit milah (ritual circumcision), or a siyum (completing a tractate of Talmud or Mishnah). Seudot fixed in the calendar (i.e., for holidays and fasts) are also considered seudot mitzvah, but many have their own, more commonly used names.

== Seudat brit milah ==
Attendance at a brit milah (circumcision ceremony) and its subsequent seudah is of such great significance that Moshe Isserles ("the Rama") notes a Talmudic saying that one who is invited but does not participate in the seudat brit milah is ostracized by God. For this reason, people are generally not invited, but merely informed of the brit's time and location. Talmudic sages have compared a brit to a korban (Temple sacrifice), and eating at a seudat brit milah to eating a Temple sacrifice. Hasidic Jews generally insist on serving meat at a seudat brit milah since most Temple offerings were meat. Sharing a meal is considered a bonding experience celebrating the covenant between God and the Jews.

== Seudat Pidyon Haben ==
Unlike other seudot mitzvah in which the meal (seudah) follows the act or ceremony which warrants the festive meal, the pidyon haben or redemption ceremony for a first-born Jewish male child is part of the meal. The ceremony is led by a kohen, who ritually washes his hands, recites the blessing over bread, and partakes of some bread before beginning the ceremony. The ceremony, which follows a traditional text, is a verbal exchange between the kohen and the father of the child. The kohen asks the father if he prefers to keep his money or pay the equivalent of five silver shekels to redeem his child. The father chooses the latter option and hands over the money, as well as recites a special blessing ("al pidyon haben"). Then the kohen verbalizes the redemption, blesses the child, and says the traditional blessing over a cup of wine, which he then drinks. The seudat mitzvah continues with all guests in attendance washing for bread and partaking of the festive meal.

While attending the seudah for a pidyon haben, the Vilna Gaon was asked whether it was true that all the Torah's commandments are alluded to in Bereishit, the first portion of the Torah. After the Gaon affirmed this, he was asked where the commandment of pidyon haben was alluded to and the Gaon replied that it was in the word Bereshit, the Hebrew initials which stand for Ben Rishon Achar Sheloshim Yom Tifdeh or "a firstborn son after thirty days redeem".

== Seudat Bar Mitzvah ==
Solomon Luria noted that the occasion of a youth becoming obligated to obey the 613 commandments is to be celebrated with a religious feast, usually including a sermon the youth has prepared. It is customary at a bar mitzvah meal for parents to give thanks and praise to God for giving them the merit to raise a child to be a bar mitzvah and to educate him in the ways of Torah and the commandments. Rabbi Ovadiah Yosef holds that a Bat Mitzvah is also a seudat mitzvah.

== Seudat Siyum Masechet ==
Based on the Talmud and Midrash, the seudah celebration upon the completion of a Talmudic tractate is considered a seudat mitzvah. This seudah is made to rejoice over the accomplishment, and also to motivate and inspire others to do the same. Chaim Elazar Spira, the Munkacser Rebbe", observed in his work Sha'ar Yissachar that the evil inclination does not want to see this type of shared joy, noting that one of the names of the evil inclination, "Samael", may be seen as an acronym for Siyum Masechet Ain La'asot, or "do not make a siyum".

== Seudat Hoda'ah ==
Seudat Hoda'ah (Hebrew: סעודת הודיה) literally means a meal of thanksgiving.

At a public meal that is given to recognize the good – Hakarat HaTov – the beneficiary gives something to others – the ability to say blessings – Brachot.

== Seudat nissuin ==
During the festive meal, seudat nissuin, following a Jewish wedding, guests participate in the mitzvah (commandment) of L'Sameach Chatan v'Kallah, to bring joy to the groom and bride. The emphasis of the celebration is on entertaining the newlyweds. At Orthodox wedding meals, men and women dance separately – sometimes separated by a mechitza ("divider") – for reasons of tzniut (modesty). At the end of the seudat nissuin, Birkat HaMazon (Grace After Meals) is recited, and the Sheva Berachot (seven blessings) that were recited under the chupah (wedding canopy) are repeated.

== Seudat havra'ah ==
Seudat havra'ah is the "meal of consolation" or comfort provided for a mourner upon his or her return from the cemetery following interment of the deceased. It usually consists of foods symbolic of life such as boiled eggs and lentil soup. The Talmud states that the lentil stew Jacob was preparing (Genesis 25:29), and for which Esau sold his birthright, was the seudat havraah for his father Isaac who was beginning to sit shiva for his father Abraham.

== Seudat Shabbat and Seudat Yom Tov ==
These include three meals on the Sabbath, as well as two (dinner and lunch) on each festival day making four each (outside Israel) for Shavuot, Rosh HaShana, Sukkot, two each for Shemini Atzeret and Simchat Torah, eight (outside Israel) for Passover. The Passover Seders are seudot mitzvah. Except for Seudah Shlishit (the "third meal" of Shabbat) all of these meals are preceded by Kiddush (the blessing, made over wine, recognizing the holiness of the day). If one recites Kiddush, Jewish law states that one must immediately eat the seudah in the same place that he heard/recited Kiddush. At Shabbat meals, it is customary to sing Zemirot (songs), learn Torah (as at meals in general) and discuss the week's portion of Scripture.

== Seudah HaMafseket ==
Seudah HaMafseket is the "separating meal" eaten before the fasts of Yom Kippur and Tisha B'Av.

The pre-Yom Kippur meal is a festive meal, which may include meat, such as Kreplach.

At the pre-Tisha B'Av meal it is forbidden to eat meat, wine, or more than one cooked food. Alcoholic beverages should be avoided. The meal is eaten sitting on the ground or a low seat. It is customary to eat a hardboiled egg, and also a piece of bread dipped into ashes, and to say, "This is the Tisha B'Av meal." During the meal, three men should not sit together so they will not have to recite the Grace after Meals as a group. None of these restrictions apply when Tisha B'Av occurs on Shabbat or Sunday.

== Seudat Purim ==
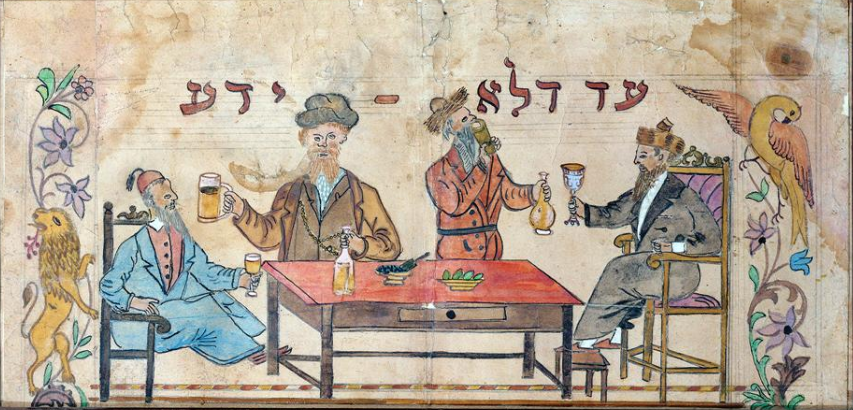
Purim painting, untitled. Safed, Israel, 19th century. Hasidic Jews celebrating Purim with a Sephardic Jew (left). The inscription is part of a passage from the Talmud urging Jews to imbibe enough alcohol so that they will not know the difference between the phrases "cursed is Haman" and "blessed is Mordechai."

On Purim day, typically toward evening, a festive meal called Seudat Purim is held, with wine as a prominent beverage, where drunkenness is not uncommon. The custom of drinking at this meal stems from a statement in the Talmud attributed to a rabbi named Rava that says one should drink on Purim until he can "no longer distinguish between arur Haman ('Cursed is Haman') and baruch Mordechai ('Blessed is Mordecai')." The reason Rava instituted the custom of drinking may have been as a critique of treating Mordecai as a hero, instead of a villain. Another view is that these phrases have the same numerical value, and some authorities, including the Be'er Hagolah and Magen Avraham, have ruled that one should drink wine until he is unable to calculate these numerical values.

This saying was codified in the Rif, Rosh, Tur, Shulchan Aruch (Orach Chayim 695), and is interpreted simply (as explained above) by the Chatam Sofer. This interpretation of the Talmudic statement, or the acceptance of the statement itself, is disputed (for various reasons) by the Ba'alei Tosafot (based on the Jerusalem Talmud), Maimonides, Rabbeinu Ephraim, Ba'al HaMa'or, Ran, Orchot Chaim, Be'er Hagolah, Magen Avraham, Taz, Rema, Vilna Gaon, Maharsha, Rashash, Tzeidah LaDerech, Hagahot Maimoniyot, Ra'avyah, Korban N'tan'el, Bach, Maharil, P'ri M'gadim, Kol Bo, Chochmat Mano'ach, Mishnah Berurah (by the Chafetz Chaim), and others. These authorities all advocate drinking wine in some quantity, but all (excepting Hagahot Maimoniyot and Ra'avyah) discourage the level of drunkenness suggested by the Chatam Sofer. The Rema says that one should only drink a little more than he is used to drinking, and then try to fall asleep (whereupon he certainly will not be able to tell the difference between the two phrases indicated by the Talmud). This position is shared by the Kol Bo and Mishnah Berurah, and is similar to that of Maimonides.

== See also ==
- Shabbat meals
- Seudah Shlishit
- Melaveh malkah
- Psalm 100
- Hakarat HaTov
