= Vetaher Libenu =

Jewish prayerbook

Vetaher Libenu (Purify Our Hearts), is a siddur published by the lay people of Congregation Beth El of the Sudbury River Valley, in Sudbury, Massachusetts, to serve the needs of that Reform Congregation. It is the first siddur to use non-sexist, inclusive language and to refer to God using feminine and masculine pronouns.

== History ==
The first edition of Vetaher Libenu was published in 1975 by the lay people serving as the Ritual Committee of Congregation Beth El of the Sudbury River Valley, Sudbury, Massachusetts, led by C. Peter R. Gossels and Nancy Lee Gossels, its editors. This siddur was intended to fill “a gap between the forms of prayer that they desired, and the Union Prayer Book” used by Reform congregations at the time, by restoring much of the traditional liturgy and offering translations that tried to capture in English the meaning of the original Hebrew. The committee also included many original poems, meditations and prayers composed by people on the committee.

In 1979, the Ritual Committee decided to revise the entire siddur by "changing the masculine and feudal epithets for God [and] . . . to use language that would reestablish the dignity of women and have meaning for our children as well." According to the introduction in Vetaher Libenu, the committee used the Book of Genesis 1:27 as a proof text to use masculine and feminine pronouns when referring to God. This verse can be translated from Hebrew as, “And God created human kind in God’s image; male and female God created them.”

The committee substituted neutral terms, such as “God,” Creator” and “Holy One,” for masculine metaphors “Lord” and “King.” The committee also introduced, for the first time, the matriarchs, Sarah, Rebekah, Rachel and Leah, into the liturgy, a practice adopted by all Reform siddurim since Vetaher Libenu's publication, as well as by some Conservative siddurim. The “most controversial change,” according to Nancy Gossels in a Boston Globe interview, “was the decision to use feminine pronouns in the Psalms in order to broaden and enrich the awareness and understanding of God, who is neither male nor female.”

As stated by the siddur's editors in the Introduction, the committee was inspired by Martin Buber’s I and Thou to compose liturgy that addressed God most often as "You," rather than "He" or "She," in order to encourage a more personal bond between the reader and his or her God.

Published in 1980, the second edition of Vetaher Libenu, edited by Nancy Lee Gossels, Joan S. Kaye, and C. Peter R. Gossels, was the first non-sexist Jewish prayer book ever published. In addition to the innovations described above, Nancy Lee Gossels and Joan S. Kaye revised the traditional Hebrew translation of Barukh atah Adonai Eloheinu, melekh ha’olam, or “Praised are You, Adonai our God, Ruler to the Universe,” to “Holy One of Blessing, Your Presence Fills Creation.” This invocation is now used by many Reform congregations. The book was copyrighted in 1980.

== Religious significance ==
The publication of Vetaher Libenu was recognized as a significant event by The Wall Street Journal, which announced the news on its front page. Major newspapers in the United States and Canada ran articles describing the event. Publication of Vetaher Libenu and its historic contents was also announced and discussed on numerous TV and radio stations. Vetaher Libenu was reviewed in many publications, including: Worship 60, Sh'ma, Reform Judaism, Conservative Judaism, and Genesis 2.

Since 1980, Vetaher Libenu has been “reviewed, cited, studied, copied and used by thousands of theologians, journalists, and laypeople. The book has been reprinted more than 14 times, and “thousands of copies sold worldwide to Christians as well as Jews.”

== Historical significance ==
Unlike traditional Jewish prayer books, a “rabbi was not part of the committee that created it.” The rabbi of Congregation Beth El, author Rabbi Lawrence Kushner, did not participate in the process to revise the prayer book.

Twenty percent of the orders for the Jewish prayer book have come from Christians.

The original poetry in Vetaher Libenu has been copied, translated and anthologized in books across the world and used at prayer services by Jews and Christians. Some of these books include: Sarah's Daughters Sing, Singing the Living Tradition, Esther erhebt hire Stimme, Kol HaNeshamah, Celebrating the New Moon, The Torah: A Woman's Commentary, and Gebete von und fur Frauen aus Geschichte und Gegenwart.
