= Shabbat meals =

Three meals eaten by Shabbat-observant Jews on Shabbat

Shabbat meals, or Shabbos meals (Hebrew: סעודות שבת, romanized: Seudot Shabbat, Seudoys Shabbos) are the three meals eaten by Shabbat-observant Jews: the first on Friday night, the second on Saturday during the day, and the third late on Saturday afternoon. The Hebrew word for "meal" is seudah, with the plural version being seudos or seudot. Therefore, the Friday night and Saturday daytime meals are often referred to as seudot or seudos. The third meal, held on Saturday afternoon, is called either shalosh seudos, seudah shlishit, or shaleshudus.

== Friday Night Meal ==
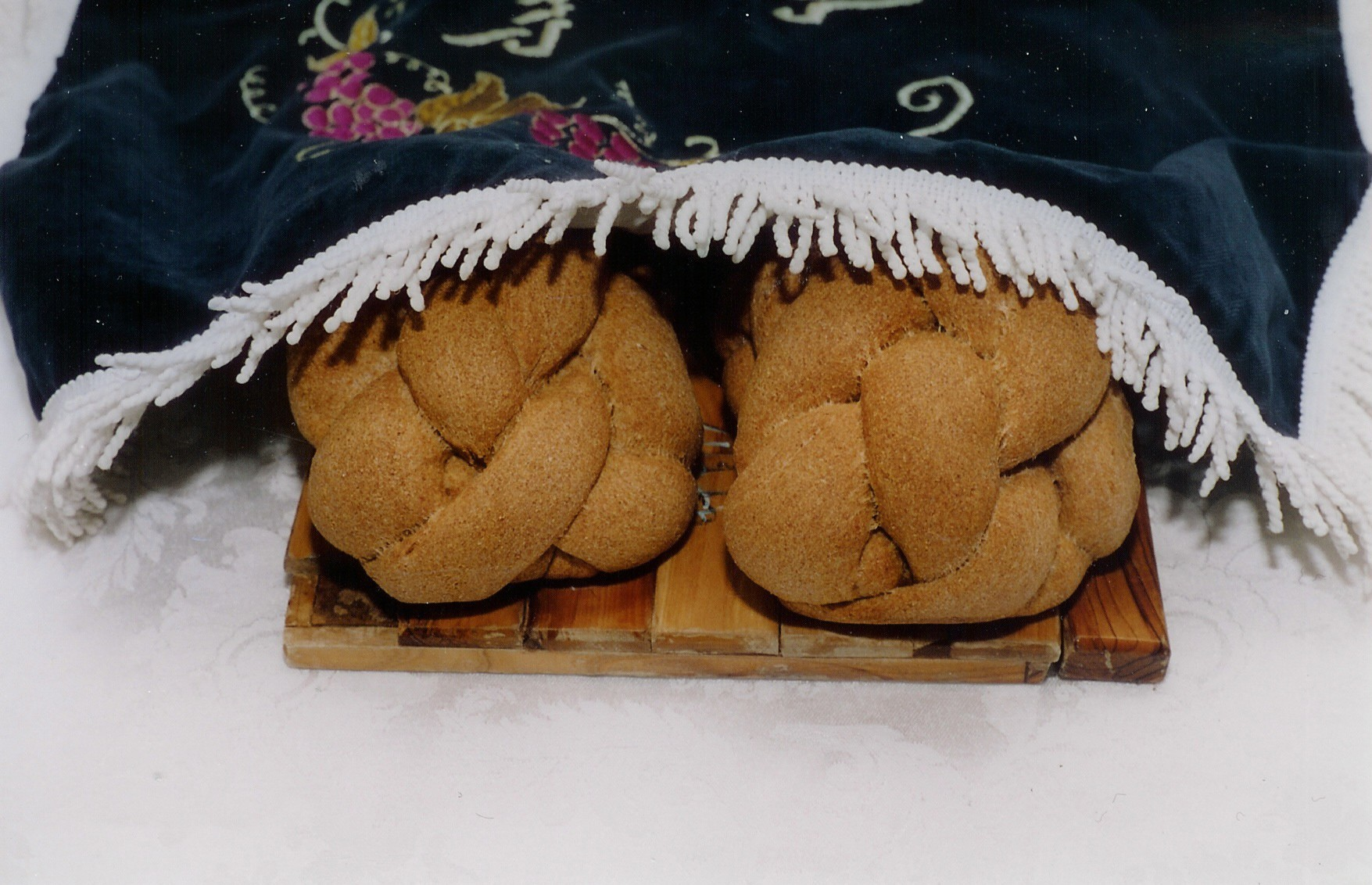
Two whole-wheat challot

The Friday night meal traditionally begins with the singing of "Shalom Aleichem", a song welcoming the angels that the Talmud says visit every Jewish home on Friday night. This is often followed by the singing of "Eishet Chayil" (Proverbs 31, also pronounced "eishes chayil"), a song praising the Jewish woman.

In most communities, the singing of "Eishet Chayil" is followed by kiddush, the Jewish practice of sanctifying the Sabbath over a cup of wine or grape juice. Following kiddush, the meal continues with handwashing before eating bread. The meal then begins, with the head of the household lifting up two challah breads, and reciting the blessing of Hamotzi. The challah is sliced, dipped into salt, and eaten. The meal continues with festive foods (often chicken), often with singing and sharing Torah thoughts.

It is customary at Ashkenazic Shabbos meals to eat "gefilte fish" at the beginning of the meal, a dish made of ground, deboned fish, commonly carp, whitefish, pike, and Nile perch. Chicken soup is also commonly eaten at the Friday night meal.

There are two further customs, common to all meals. Zemirot are sung around the table (usually between courses; and often by the men only). These help achieve the religious aspiration of transforming the domestic table into a recreation of the Temple altar; see Korban § Purpose. Similarly the host will usually deliver a short Torah idea, or Dvar Torah, before the Birkat Hamazon Grace after meals.

== Saturday Day Meal ==
The Saturday morning meal traditionally begins with kiddush and Hamotzi on two challot.

It is customary to eat hot foods at this meal. During and after the Second Temple period, the Sadducees, who rejected the Oral Torah, did not eat heated food on Shabbat (as heated food appears to be prohibited in the written section of the Torah). To express that they followed the Oral Torah, the Pharisees (who followed of the Tannaim) specifically ate heated food on Shabbat. The tradition of eating hot foods on Shabbat has lasted till today.

In Ashkenazic communities, the custom of eating hot foods is observed by eating cholent, a stew made primarily of meat, potatoes, beans, barley and spices. Sauces, onions, carrots, hot dogs, kugel, and ketchup are often added. Sephardic Jews, including Moroccans and Iraqis, observe the custom of eating hot foods by eating chamin (Hebrew for hot), a similar stew. Bukharian Jews eat a similar stew called Osh Sovo (or "ussvo").

== Shalosh Seudos ==
The third meal of Shabbat, called Shalosh seudos, Seudah Shlishit (which literally means "Third Meal" in Hebrew), or Shaleshudus, begins before sundown of Saturday night, although it may continue after. It begins with washing for bread and reciting the Hamotzi blessing on two challot. Dairy is sometimes eaten at shalosh seudos.

== See also ==
- Jewish cuisine
  - Ashkenazi Jewish cuisine
  - Israeli cuisine
  - Sephardic Jewish cuisine
- Kashrut
  - Kosher foods
  - Kosher wine
- Kiddush
- Melaveh Malkah
- Sabbath stew
  - Cholent
  - Hamin
- Seudat mitzvah
- Tza'ar ba'alei chayim
