= Nancy Lee Gossels =

American artist, editor and poet

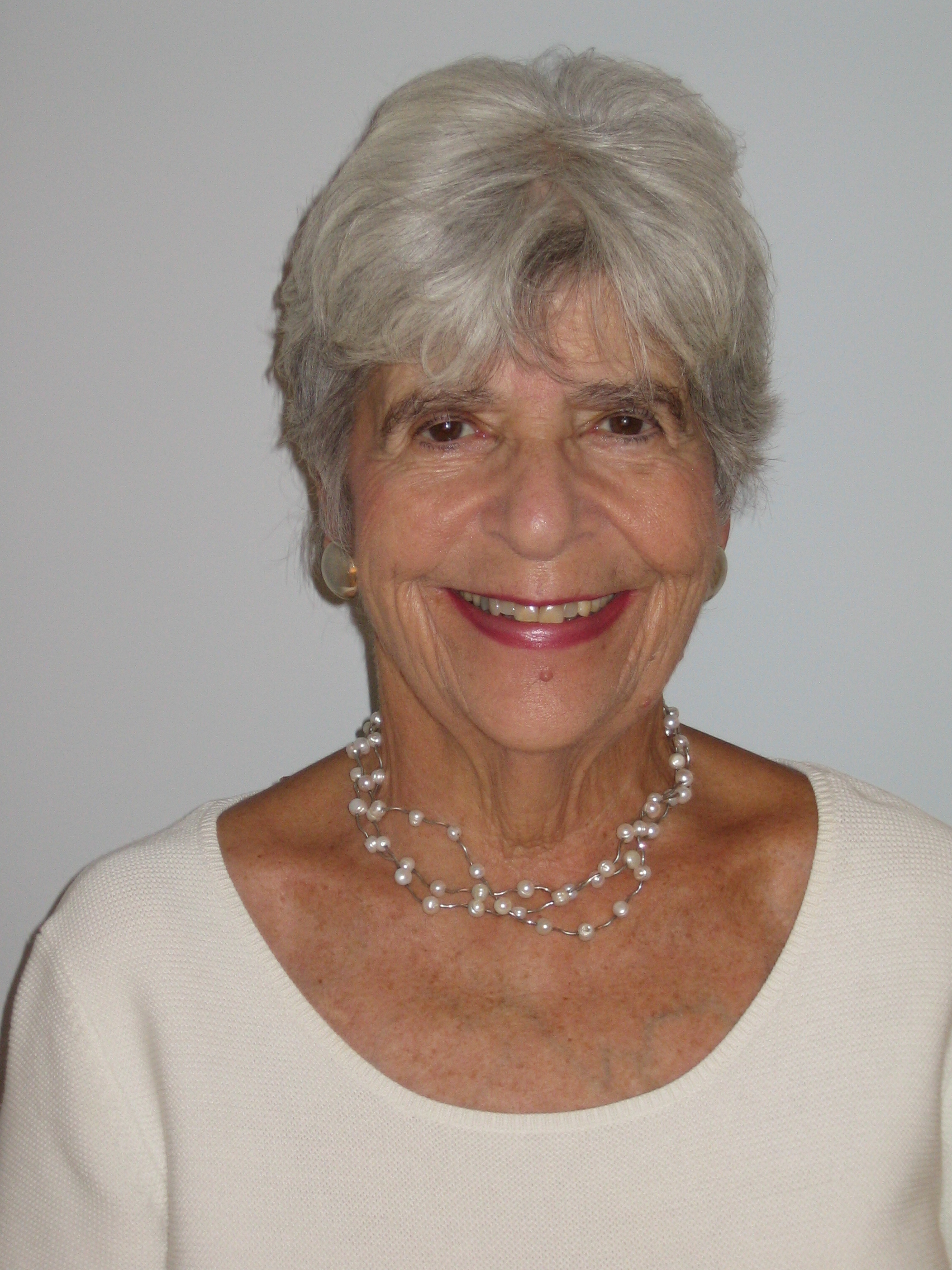
Nancy Gossels

Nancy Lee Gossels is an American artist, editor and poet known for her sculpture and liturgical works. Gossels was named a Copley Artist in 1996 by the prestigious Copley Society of Art. She is also co-editor of the first egalitarian Jewish prayer book, Vetaher Libenu, published in 1980.

== Personal life ==
Born in Norwich, Connecticut, Gossels was raised in Putnam, Connecticut by her parents, Benjamin and Sadie Tuber. She received a Bachelor of Arts degree (magna cum laude) from Pembroke College (Brown University) and was elected into the Phi Beta Kappa Society. In 1958, she married C. Peter R. Gossels. They have three children: Lisa R. Gossels, who was honored by the Academy of Television Arts & Sciences in 2001 which awarded her an Emmy for her film, The Children of Chabannes; Amy D. Gossels, a casting director, film producer and teacher; and Daniel J. Gossels, an investment banker.

== Artistic career ==
Gossels worked at The Atlantic Monthly from 1956 to 1958. Gossels subsequently served as associate editor of Child Life Magazine from 1958 to 1960 and as a reporter and columnist for the Cochituate/Wayland/Weston Town Crier from 1962 to 1964.

Gossels began her artistic career as a painter, but over time found that her painting was becoming more and more sculptural. In 1986, Gossels and Brenda Zaltas exchanged ideas about designing outdoor sculptures from found metal, discovered that the metal shapes reminded them of menorahs and embarked on a new career. Although they worked separately, they shared a vision and often showed their work together in art exhibits and galleries.

Since the late 1980s, Gossels has received national attention for her unique "found metal" sculptures, both religious and non-religious, which "have been shown in museums, galleries and selected juried exhibitions" across the U.S., including the Bronx Museum of the Arts, Yeshiva University Museum, the National Museum of American Jewish History in Philadelphia, Mizel Museum in Denver, and the Flagler Museum in Palm Beach.

In 1988, the In the Spirit Studio / Gallery in New York City featured her aluminum and brass menorah titled, Brave New World. McCalls featured Gossels' Reflections, a Chanukah lamp with bronze mirror back, in its December 1990 article, "The Art of the Menorah."

At the General Assembly of the Council of Jewish Federations, Combined Jewish Philanthropies included a gift shop that displayed "unique Jewish artworks from throughout the world," including Gossels' menorah works created from industrial metals.

In 1996 Gossels was named a "Copley Artist" by the Copley Society of Art, the oldest art association in America. In order to qualify for this honor, an artist must meet the demanding standards for membership in the society and must have his or her work accepted into five different juried shows produced by the society.

Gossels received her art training at the DeCordova Museum School in Lincoln, Massachusetts. She also took classes with Boston area artists Glenda Tall and George Dergalis.

Her works are also represented in a growing number of private collections.

== Liturgical work ==
In addition to her sculpture, Gossels is a poet. According to an interview in the Wayland Town Crier, designing sculptural pieces made her realize "the connection between the written word and the visual piece."

While serving as a member of the National Commission on Worship of the Jewish reform movement between 1976 and 1980 and as Vice President of Congregation Beth El of the Sudbury River Valley in Sudbury, Massachusetts, Gossels composed and edited (with Joan S. Kaye and her husband, C. Peter R. Gossels) the first egalitarian Jewish prayer book for the Sabbath and Festivals, Vetaher Libenu, which was published in 1980. Among the many innovations contained in Vetaher Libenu, Nancy Lee Gossels and Joan S. Kaye revised the traditional Hebrew translation of "Barukh atah Adonai Eloheinu, melekh ha’olam," or "Praised are You, Adonai our God, Ruler to the Universe," to "Holy One of Blessing, Your Presence Fills Creation." This invocation is now used by many Reform congregations.

This siddur, which has sold more than 10,000 copies worldwide, contains many liturgical poems written by Gossels (including her well-known poem, "Somewhere Out of Time"), which have been widely republished, translated into German, anthologized and included in the Singing the Living Tradition, hymnal of the Unitarian Universalism Association.

Gossels' poetry has also been included in the anthologies, Sarah's Daughters Sing, Esther erhebt ihre Stimme, Kol HaNeshamah, Celebrating the New Moon, The Torah: A Woman's Commentary,, Covenant of the Generations, and Gates of Shabbat: A Guide for Observing Shabbat.

Gossels served as the editor of Chadesh Yamenu (Renew Our Days), an egalitarian machzor for Rosh HaShanah, published in 1997 and Kanfay HaShachar (Wings of Dawn), a siddur for weekly morning worship published in 2003.

In 2011, Gossels co-edited Veha'er Eyneynu (Enlighten Our Eyes) with Michael Mirman, Harry Abadi and Sheila R. Deitchman.

== Public service ==
From 1976 to 1977, Gossels served as committee chair of the building committee for Congregation Beth El of the Sudbury River Valley. In this capacity, she oversaw the enlargement of the temple building.

In 2005, Gossels was honored by the Massachusetts Association of School Committees for her commitment to public education and her generosity of time, energy and support to enhance the educational opportunities of students at Wayland High School by creating and endowing the Gossels Fund for Academic Excellence and the Gossels Fund for Human Dignity.

Gossels served as a trustee of the Exploration School from 2001 to 2011, a summer enrichment program for approximately 3,000 students from Grade 4 through high school on the campuses of the St. Mark's School (Massachusetts), Wellesley College and Yale University.

She currently serves as a member of the board of directors of the Boston Jewish Film Festival and Temple Shir Tikva in Wayland, Massachusetts.
