= Gates of Prayer =

Reform Jewish siddur

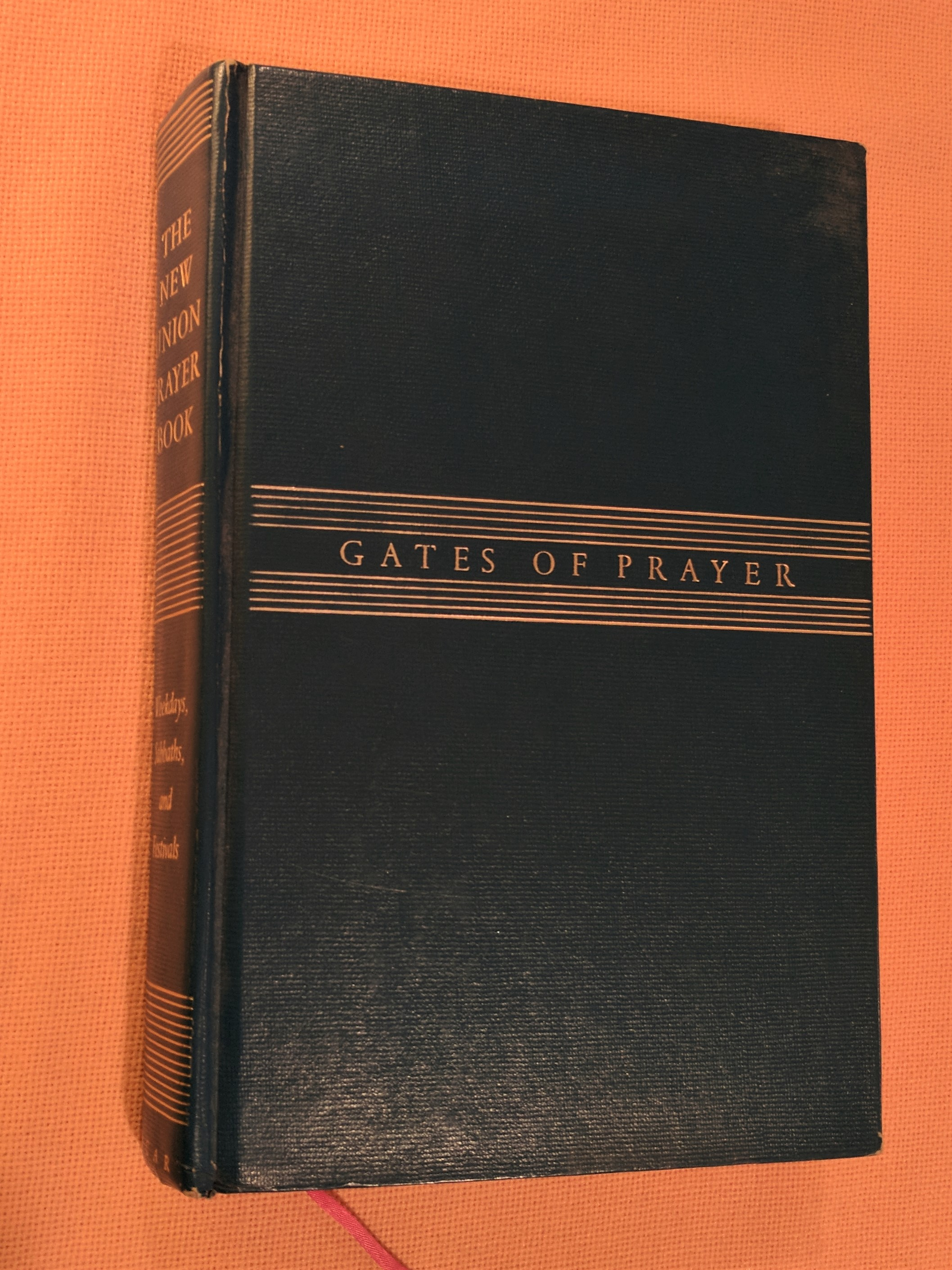
- Author: Central Conference of American Rabbis
- Language: English and Hebrew
- Subject: Prayer Book
- Genre: Reform Jewish Siddur
- Publisher: CCAR Press
- Publication date: 1975
- Preceded by: Union Prayer Book
- Followed by: Mishkan T'filah

Gates of Prayer, the New Union Prayer Book (GOP) is a Reform Jewish siddur that was announced in October 1975 as a replacement for the 80-year-old Union Prayer Book (UPB), incorporating more Hebrew content and was updated to be more accessible to modern worshipers. The prayer book was officially approved by the Joint Commission on Worship of the Union of American Hebrew Congregations (now the Union for Reform Judaism) and the Central Conference of American Rabbis. In 1978, CCAR released the complementary Gates of Repentance, The New Union Prayerbook for the Days of Awe machzor for the High Holy Days.

== Many changes ==
There were many changes in wording aimed at gender neutrality, such as changing "our fathers" to "our ancestors". The "thees" and "thous" of the UPB were all changed to "you". A wide variety of prayer options are offered, including ten for Friday night services, six for Shabbat morning and others for holidays, weekdays and other special occasions. Additional readings were included from philosophers Martin Buber and Alfred North Whitehead; poets E. E. Cummings, John Masefield and Nelly Sachs; Rabbi Abraham Joshua Heschel and from Elie Wiesel.

In its 779 pages, Gates of Prayer added services to commemorate Israeli Independence Day and The Holocaust, reflecting the changed realities from the days of the Union Prayer Book. An optional Hebrew opening format was offered for the first time and Friday night service variations were included, all reflecting a greater acceptance of traditional forms of Jewish worship that had been eliminated in the UPB. The GOP sold 50,000 copies in its inaugural year and had sales of some 1.5 million as of 2006.

== Criticism and follow-up ==
Gates of Prayer was criticized as being a non-cohesive collection of prayers, resulting in a prayer book that was too large, and for its retention of masculine pronouns when referring to God. To address these issues, some congregations prepared their own prayer materials (often with edits to neutralize gender) or continued use of the Union Prayer Book.

A project to address these concerns and increase the poeticism of a future prayerbook was initiated in 1981. Israeli poet T. Carmi was brought in to provide guidance on post-biblical Hebrew texts that could be incorporated into the Reform liturgy. The "Carmi Project" generated hundreds of possibilities, many of which would later be integrated into Mishkan T'filah, the successor to Gates of Prayer.
