= Hakarat HaTov =

Hebrew term for gratitude

Hakarat HaTov (or Hakaras HaTov; Hebrew: הַכָּרַת הַטּוֹב), is the Hebrew term for gratitude. It literally means "recognizing the good".

== Etymology ==
The Hebrew word lehakir means "to recognize" and the word tov means "good" or "goodness".

== History ==
The word "Jew" is derived from the name given to Judah (son of Jacob), son of Jacob and Leah. The Hebrew for Judah is Yehudah, from the wording "I will praise" (odeh, Gen. 29:35). The root for this wording means "to thank". and refers to "I am grateful."

Hakaras Hatov is an attitude and a required part of the Jewish way of life:

- Your children are exhausting, but you have children.
- You misplaced your car keys, but you do own a car.

It is internal, whereas by contrast HoDaa, giving thanks, is an action.

Rabbi Yissocher Frand explains the sequence: we must first admit we needed someone before we can thank them. The difference is that HaKaras HaTov is about everyone who helps us, whether we needed it or not, and Hoda'ah is thanking someone for something we could not have done on our own.

The Torah commands not to despise the Egyptian "for you were a stranger in his land" (Deut. 23:8); the Jewish people received hospitality and recognize this. Although when "A new king arose over Egypt who did not know of Yoseph" (Exod. 1:8), meaning "he did not WANT to know who he was! He lacked hakarat hatov for all that Yoseph had done for the Egyptian people," Jews are expected to do their part in giving recognition. "We owe a debt of gratitude even to our oppressors for the small kindness they may have done for us", even though the Egyptians "did not know of Yoseph".

== Thanking publicly ==
There is a publicly said prayer for giving thanks for surviving an illness or danger, Birkhat HaGomel, which is recited before a Torah scroll. Sometimes Jews publicly give thanks with a Seudas Hodaa, a public meal of thanksgiving.

At the Passover Seder, Jews sing the song "Dayenu", the theme of which is that even if the Jewish people had not received all the blessings they did, they would still have been thankful for what they did receive.

== See also ==
- Psalm 100
