= Rinat Yisrael =

Siddurim

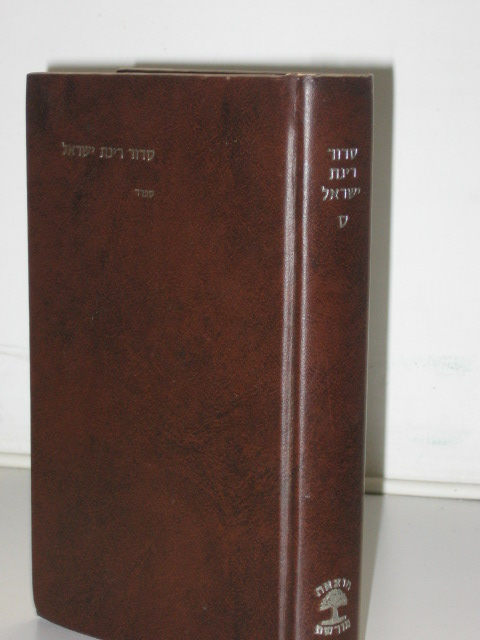
Rinat Yisrael Siddur

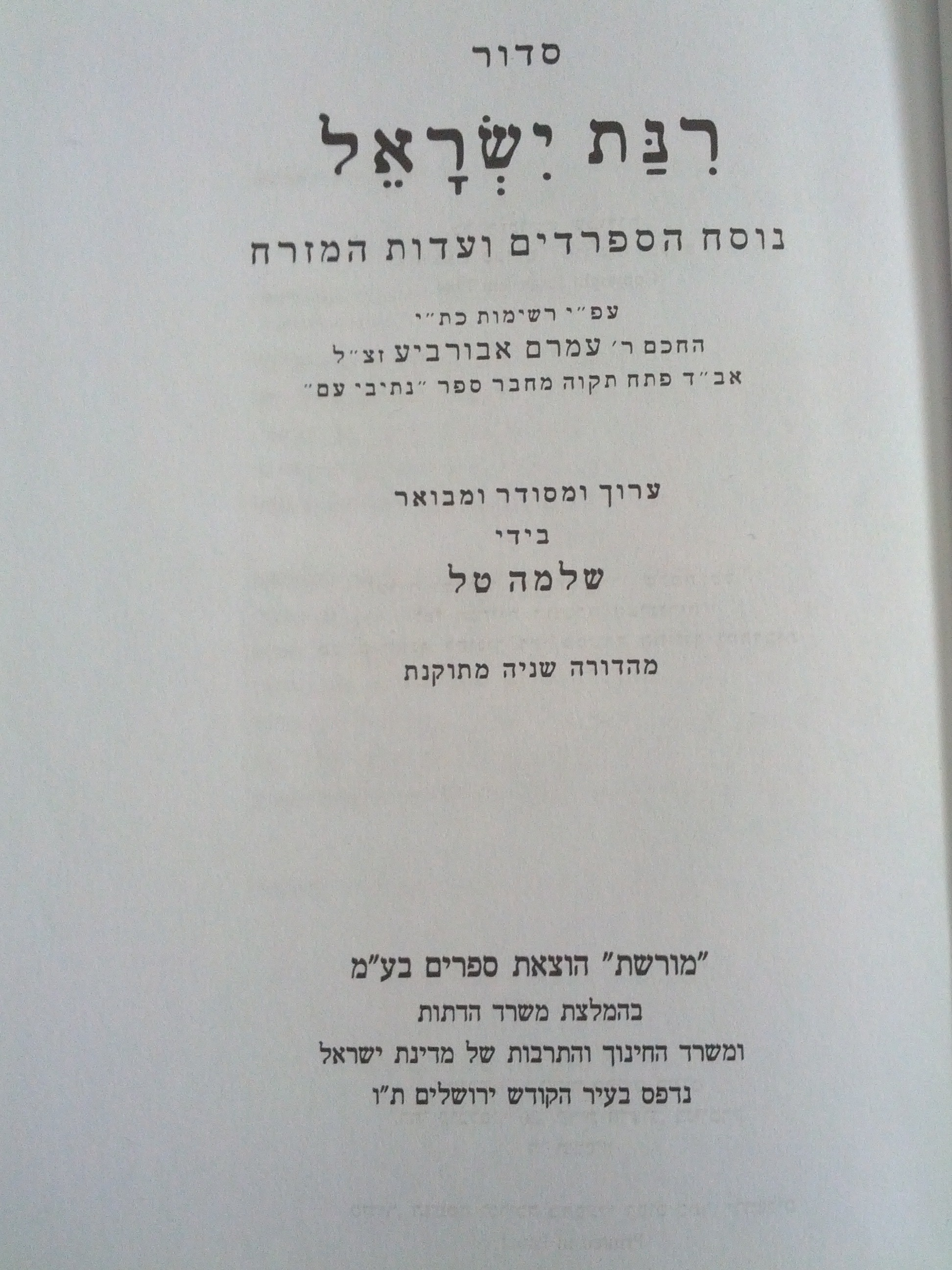
Title page of Nusach HaSfaradim and Edot HaMizrach.

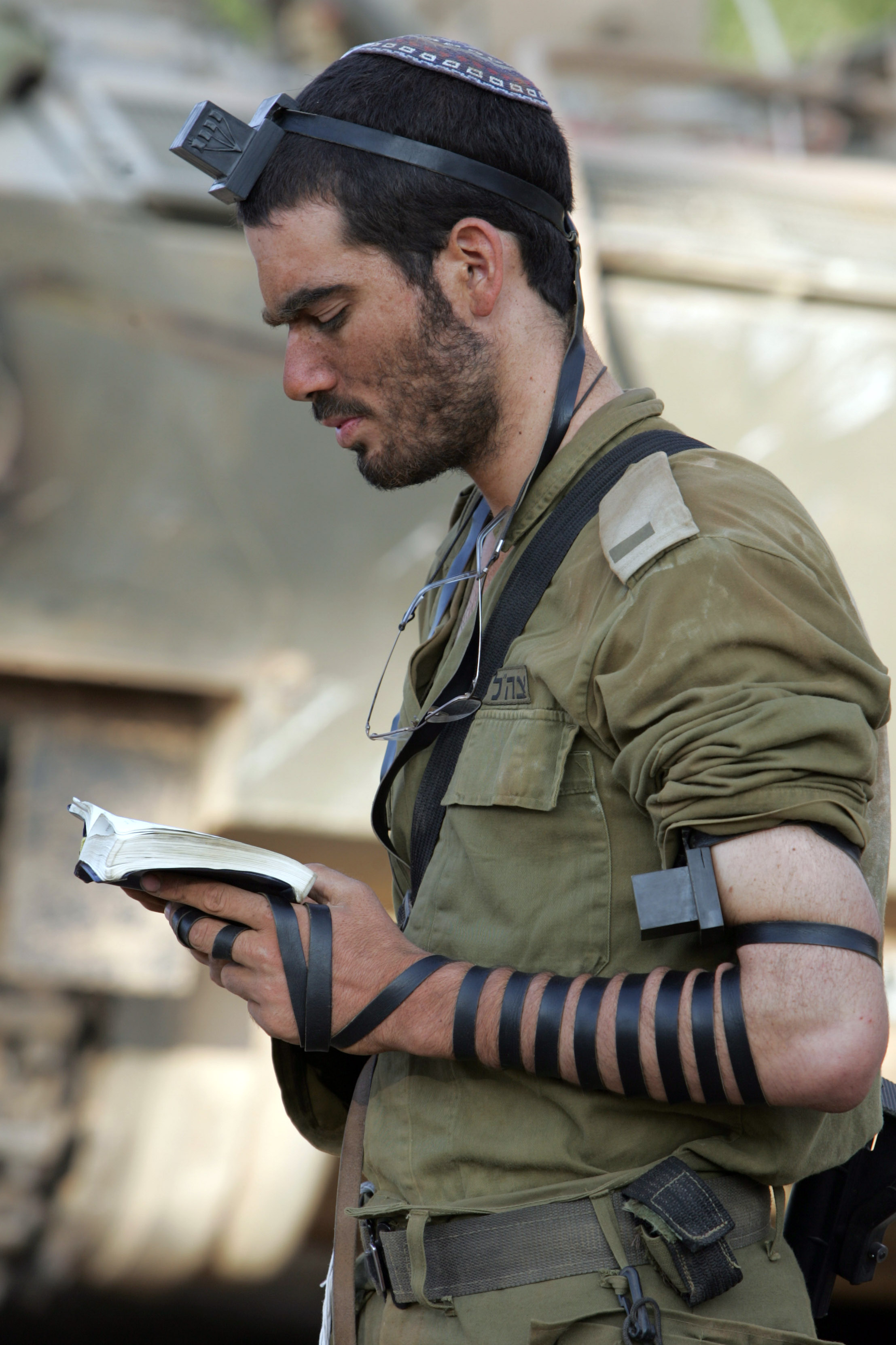
"Pocket-sized" edition (seen here is Lt. Asael Lubotzky).

Rinat Yisrael (רינת ישראל; "Jubilation of Israel") is a family of siddurim (prayer books), popular within the Religious Zionist communities in Israel; and used by some Modern Orthodox in the Diaspora. They are available in Hebrew only. The siddur was first published in 1970 by the Moreshet Publishing Company, and edited by Dr. Shlomo Tal; as of 2016, a new edition of the various siddurim is being released, under the editorship of Rabbi Yoel Katan.

== Details ==
Published in connection with the Israeli Ministry of Education, the siddur aims to allow youngsters and students to become familiar and comfortable with the siddur and prayer service. To further this goal, Rinat Yisrael uses a large typeface, a modern, easy to read font (Frank-Rühl; see example in aside picture), and special symbols to denote which syllable a word is accented on. Additionally, most passages are printed in the same size type, in order not to lend the impression that some prayers are more important than others (see similar re the Birnbaum siddur).

Also included are references to verses quoted from the Tanakh, Modern Hebrew equivalents of biblical language unfamiliar to young speakers, and translation of Aramaic passages. A halachik guide to daily and monthly prayer and practice is appended.

New prayers recognizing the rebirth of the State of Israel have been added, including a Prayer for the Welfare of the State of Israel, a Prayer for the Soldiers of The IDF, and a service for Israel Independence Day.

== Versions ==
Rinat Yisrael has been published in three different versions, or Nuschaot: Ashkenaz (published in both Israel and Diaspora versions), Sefard, and Sephardic / Edot HaMizrach. Rabbi Shlomo Tal edited the machzorim, and Rabbi Amram Aburbeh provided input to the Sephardic version. The siddurim are published in various sizes.

== Machzorim ==
Along with the siddur, other publications in the Rinat Yisrael series include machzorim for Rosh Hashanah, Yom Kippur, Sukkot, Pesach, and Shavuot; a haggadah; a book of selichot, and a book of kinnot for Tisha B'av. These are all produced in different versions, as the prayer book above.

== See also ==
- Koren Siddur
