= Elazar ben Moshe Azikri =

16th Century Kabbalist

Elazar ben Moshe Azikri אלעזר בן משה אזכרי
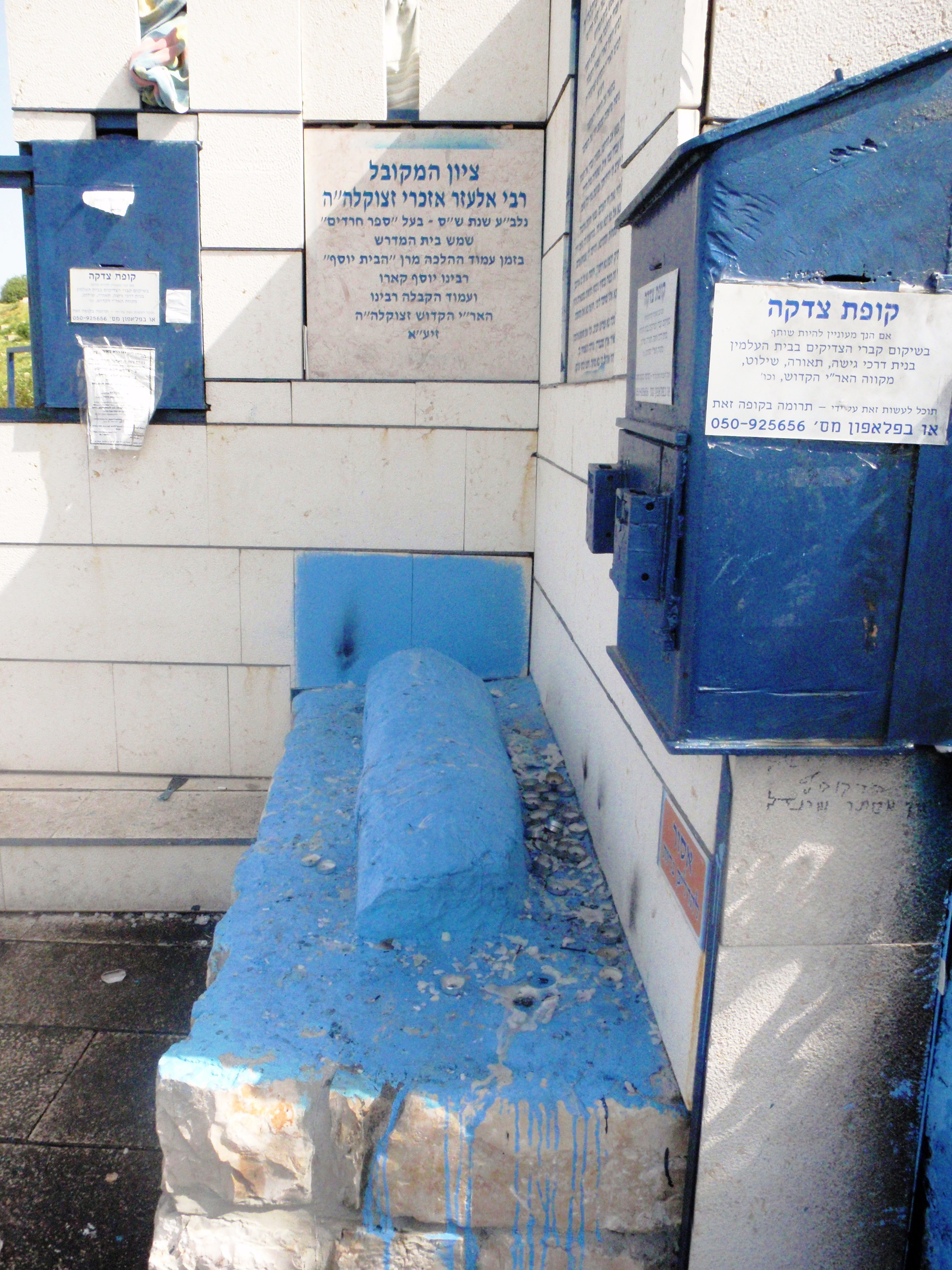
- Rabbi Elazar Azikri's grave in Safed

Personal life
- Born: 1533 Safed, Israel
- Died: 1600 (aged 66–67) Safed, Israel
- Buried: Safed Old Jewish Cemetery

Religious life
- Religion: Judaism

Rabbi Elazar ben Moshe Azikri (Hebrew: אלעזר בן משה אזכרי; 1533–1600) was a Jewish kabbalist, poet and writer.

== Biography ==
Azikri was born in Safed to a Sephardic family who had settled in Ottoman Syria after the expulsion of Jews from Spain. He studied Torah under Yosef Sagis, Jacob Berab, and in the yeshiva of Moses ben Jacob Cordovero.

He is counted with the greatest Rabbis and intellectuals of his time: Shlomo Halevi Alkabetz, Yosef Karo, Moshe Cordovero, Isaac Luria, and Israel ben Moses Najara, among others. He was one of a handful of rabbis to receive the renewed rabbinic semikhah initiated by Jacob Berab.

In 1588 Rabbi Elazar founded the "Sukat Shalom" movement, which acted to arouse in Jews devotion to religion. His Sefer Haredim blends a halakhic enumeration of the 613 commandments with Kabbalist ethics and is one of the central works of its genre.

Rabbi Elazar died in 1600 and was buried in Safed Old Jewish Cemetery.

== Works ==
Rabbi Elazar's best known Book, the Sefer Haredim (Hebrew: ספר חרדים), is a famous discussion of the 613 commandments and is one of the main works of Jewish deontology. It was printed after his death in 1600. Its arrangement differs from other similar books: First, the commandments are arranged according to the human body and/or the time on which they depend in their observance; second, the work does not maintain a single count of the commandments but rather lists these according to the opinion of several Rishonim.

He also wrote a commentary on Tractates Beitza and Berakhot of the Jerusalem Talmud.

The piyyut (liturgical poem) Yedid Nefesh is commonly attributed to Elazar, who first published it in the Sefer Haredim.
