= Siddur =

Jewish prayerbook

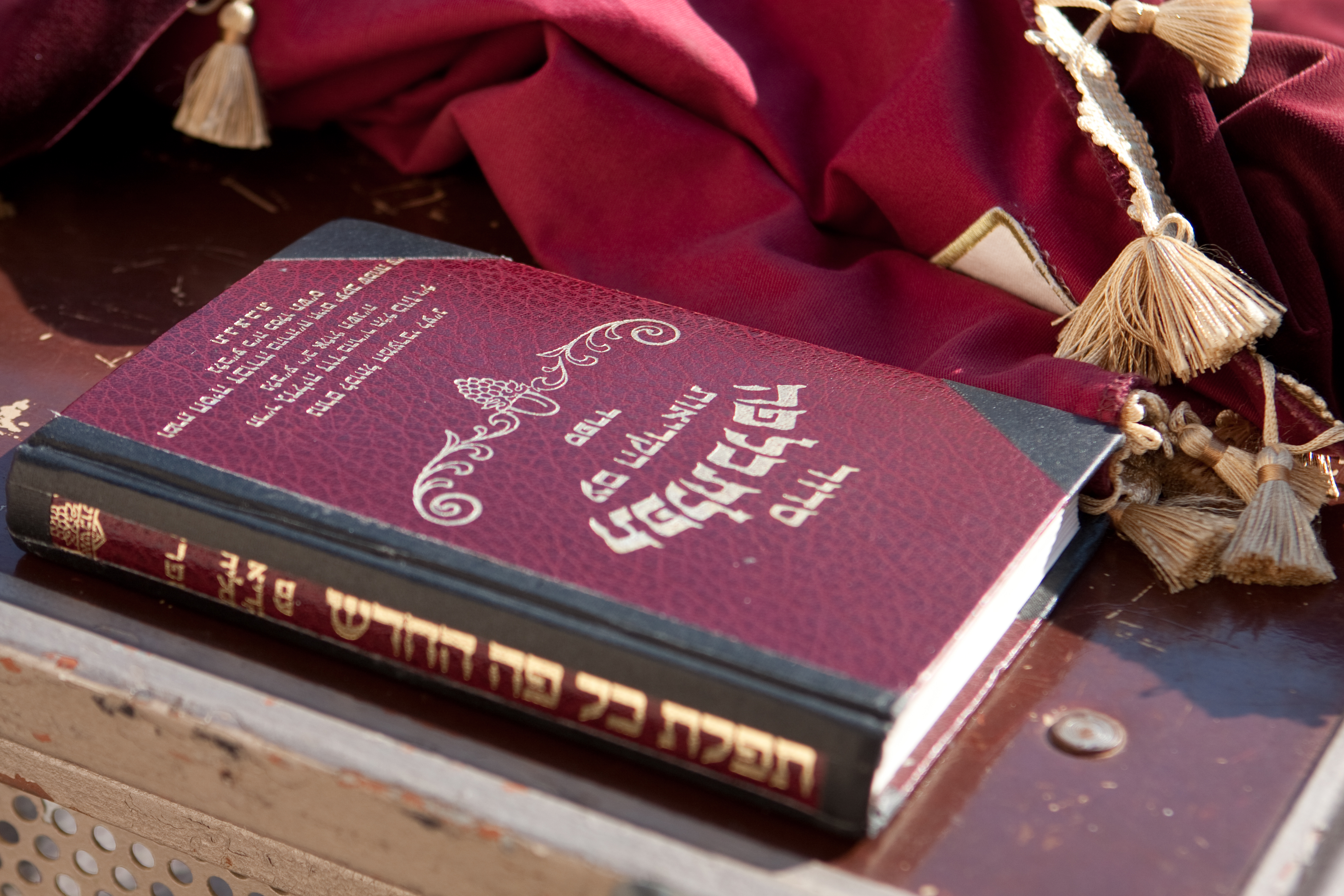
- Example of a Jewish prayer book
- Author: Various
- Language: Hebrew, with translations in many languages
- Subject: Jewish prayers and liturgy
- Genre: Religious text
- Publisher: Various
- Publication date: Since antiquity; modern printed versions from 15th century onward
- Media type: Print, digital

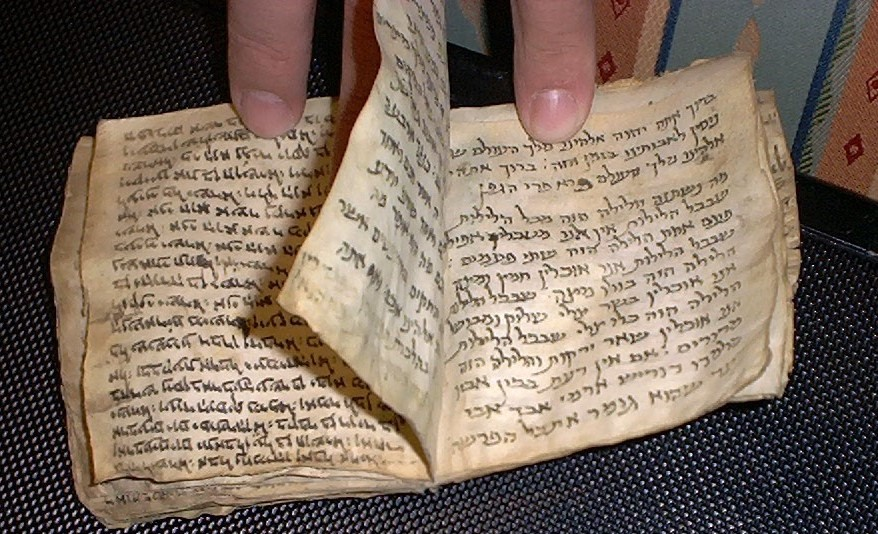
The Afghan Liturgical Quire, the oldest known siddur in the world. From the 8th century

A siddur (Hebrew: סִדּוּר sīddūr, [siˈduʁ, 'sɪdəʁ]; plural siddurim סִדּוּרִים [siduˈʁim]) is a Jewish prayer book containing a set order of daily prayers. The word siddur comes from the Hebrew root ס־ד־ר, meaning 'order.'

Other terms for prayer books are tefillot (תְּפִלּוֹת) among Sephardi Jews, tefillah among German Jews, and tiklāl (תכלאל) among Yemenite Jews.

== History ==
The earliest parts of Jewish prayer books are the Shema Yisrael ("Hear O Israel") (Deuteronomy 6:4 et seq) and the Priestly Blessing (Numbers 6:24-26), which are in the Torah. A set of eighteen (currently nineteen) blessings called the Shemoneh Esreh or the Amidah (Hebrew, "standing [prayer]"), is traditionally ascribed to the Great Assembly in the time of Ezra, at the end of the biblical period.

The name Shemoneh Esreh, literally "eighteen", is a historical anachronism, since it now contains nineteen blessings. It was only near the end of the Second Temple period that the eighteen prayers of the weekday Amidah became standardized. Even at that time their precise wording and order was not yet fixed, and varied from locale to locale. Many modern scholars believe that parts of the Amidah came from the Hebrew apocryphal work Ben Sira.

According to the Talmud, soon after the destruction of the Temple in Jerusalem a formal version of the Amidah was adopted at a rabbinical council in Yavne, under the leadership of Gamaliel II and his colleagues. However, the precise wording was still left open. The order, general ideas, opening and closing lines were fixed. Most of the wording was left to the individual reader. It was not until several centuries later that the prayers began to be formally fixed. By the Middle Ages the texts of the prayers were nearly fixed, and in the form in which they are still used today, albeït with significant variations across communities. Scholars generally trace the formation of fixed Jewish prayer to the Geonic period (7th–11th centuries), when rabbinic leaders in Babylonia created more standardized forms of liturgy to meet the needs of their communities. During this time, the first complete siddurim appeared, including the important 10th-century prayer book compiled by Saadia Gaon. In the centuries that followed, different Jewish communities developed their own rites (nuschaot), shaped by local customs and halakhic interpretations.

The Siddur was printed by Soncino in Italy as early as 1486, though a Siddur was first mass-distributed only in 1865. The Siddur began appearing in the vernacular as early as 1538. The first English translation was published in London in 1738 by an author writing under the pseudonym Gamaliel ben Pedahzur; a different translation was released in the United States in 1837.

=== Creation ===
Readings from the Torah (five books of Moses) and the Nevi'im ("Prophets") form part of the prayer services. To this framework various Jewish sages added, from time to time, various prayers, and, for festivals especially, numerous hymns.

The earliest existing codification of the prayerbook was drawn up by Amram ben Sheshna of Sura Academy in Sawad, the Abbasid Caliphate, an area known as "Babylonia" in Jewish texts, about 850 CE (Seder Rav ʿAmram). Half a century later, Saadia Gaon, also of Sura, composed a siddur (see Siddur of Saadia Gaon), in which the rubrical matter is in Judeo-Arabic. These were the basis of Simhah ben Samuel of Vitry's 11th century Machzor Vitry, which was based on the ideas of his teacher, Rashi. Another formulation of the prayers was that appended by Maimonides to the Book of Love in his Mishneh Torah: this forms the basis of the Yemenite liturgy, and has had some influence on other rites. From this point forward all Jewish prayerbooks had the same basic order and contents.

Two authoritative versions of the Ashkenazi siddur were those of Shabbetai Sofer in the 16th century and Seligman Baer in the 19th century; siddurim have also been published reflecting the views of Jacob Emden and the Vilna Gaon.

=== Different Jewish rites ===
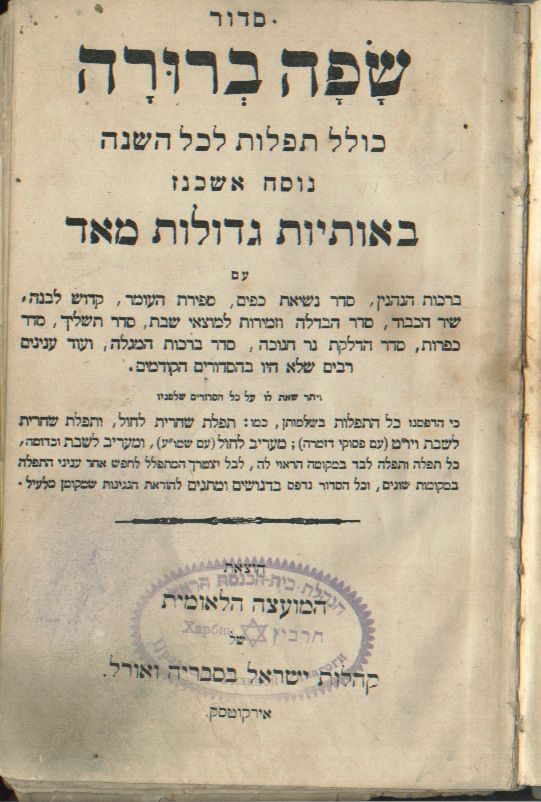
Nusach Ashkenaz Siddur from Irkutsk, Russia, printed in 1918

There are differences among, amongst others, the Sephardic (including Spanish and Portuguese and Mizrachim), Teimani (Yemenite), Hasidic, Ashkenazic (divided into German, Polish and other European and eastern-European rites), Bené Roma or Italkim, Romaniote (Greek, once extending to Turkey, Crimea and the southern Italian peninsula) and also Persian, Kurdish, Bukharian, Georgian, Mountain Jewish, Ethiopian and Cochin-Jewish liturgies. Most of these are slight differences in the wording of the prayers; for instance, Oriental Sephardic and some Hasidic prayer books state "חננו מאתך חכמה בינה ודעת", "Graciously bestow upon us from You wisdom (ḥochmah), understanding (binah) and knowledge (daat)", in allusion to the Kabbalistic sefirot of those names, while the Nusach Ashkenaz, as well as Western Sephardic and other Hasidic versions retain the older wording "חננו מאתך דעה בינה והשכל", "Graciously bestow upon us from You knowledge, understanding, and reason". In some cases, however, the order of the preparation for the Amidah is drastically different, reflecting the different halakhic and kabbalistic formulae that the various scholars relied on in assembling their prayer books, as well as the minhagim, or customs, or their locales.

Some forms of the Sephardic rite are considered to be very overtly kabbalistic, depending on how far they reflect the ritual of Isaac Luria (see Lurianic Kabbalah). This is partly because the Tetragrammaton frequently appears with varying vowel points beneath the letters (unpronounced, but to be meditated upon) and different Names of God appear in small print within the final hei (ה) of the Tetragrammaton. In some editions, there is a Psalm in the preparations for the Amidah that is printed in the outline of a menorah, and the worshipper meditates on this shape as he recites the psalm.

While the Ashkenazic rite does contain some kabbalistic elements, such as acrostics and allusions to the sefirot ("To You, God, is the greatness [gedullah], and the might [gevurah], and the glory [tiferet], longevity [netzach],..." etc.), these are not easily seen unless the reader is already initiated. It is notable that although many other traditions avoid using the poem Anim Zemiroth on the Sabbath, for fear that its holiness would be less appreciated due to the frequency of the Sabbath, the poem is usually sung by Ashkenazi congregations before concluding the Sabbath Musaf service with the daily psalm. The ark is opened for the duration of the song.

Hasidim, though usually ethnically Ashkenazi, usually use liturgies with varying degrees of Sephardic influence, such as Nusach Sefard and Nusach Ari, in order to follow the order of the prayers set by Rabbi Isaac Luria, often called "Ari HaKadosh", or "The Holy Lion". Although the Ari himself was born to an Ashkenazi father and Sephardic mother, he borrowed many elements from Sephardi and other traditions, since he felt that they followed Kabbalah and Halacha more faithfully. The Ari did not publish any siddur, but orally transmitted his particular usages to his students with interpretations and certain meditations. Many siddurim containing some form of the Sephardic rite together with the usages of the Ari were published, both by actual Sephardic communities and for the use of Hasidim and other Ashkenazim interested in Kabbalah. In 1803, Rabbi Schneur Zalman of Liadi compiled an authoritative siddur from the sixty siddurim that he checked for compliance with Hebrew grammar, Jewish law, and Kabbalah: some call this siddur "Nusach Ari", and is used by Lubavitch Hasidim. Those that use Nusach HaAri claim that it is an all-encompassing nusach that is valid for any Jew, no matter what his ancestral tribe or identity, a view attributed to the Maggid of Mezeritch.

The Mahzor of each rite is distinguished by hymns (piyyutim). The most important writers are Jose ben Jose, probably in the 4th-5th century CE, chiefly known for his compositions for Rosh Hashanah and Yom Kippur; Yannai; Eleazar Kalir, the founder of the payyetanic style, perhaps in the 7th century; Saadia Gaon; the Spanish school, consisting of Joseph ibn Abitur (died in 970), ibn Gabirol, Isaac Gayyath, Moses ibn Ezra, Abraham ibn Ezra and Judah ha-Levi, Moses ben Nahman (Nahmanides) and Isaac Luria; and the Ashkenazic and French schools including Shimon bar Yitzchak, Meir bar Yitzchak and many others.

The Ari recited only early piyyutim, such as those by Eleazar Kalir, but did not like the Sephardic piyyutim. Therefore, on holidays he would daven (recite the prescribed liturgical prayers) with Ashkenazim—as opposed to his practice the rest of the year to daven with Sephardim—in order to recite their piyyutim, which include many more earlier piyyutim. For this reason, many Hasidim (such Belz and Viznitz) recite many piyyutim on Yom Tov and the sabbaths of the four special portions preceding Passover in accordance with the practice of the Ari. However, in Sephardic communities which accepted most of the practices of the Ari, they never accepted the Ashkenazic piyyutim.

== Complete and weekday siddurim ==
Some siddurim have only prayers for weekdays; others have prayers for weekdays and Shabbat. Many have prayers for weekdays, Shabbat, and the three Biblical festivals, Sukkot (the feast of Tabernacles), Shavuot (the feast of weeks) and Pesach (Passover). The latter are referred to as a Siddur Shalem ("complete siddur").

== Variations and additions on holidays ==
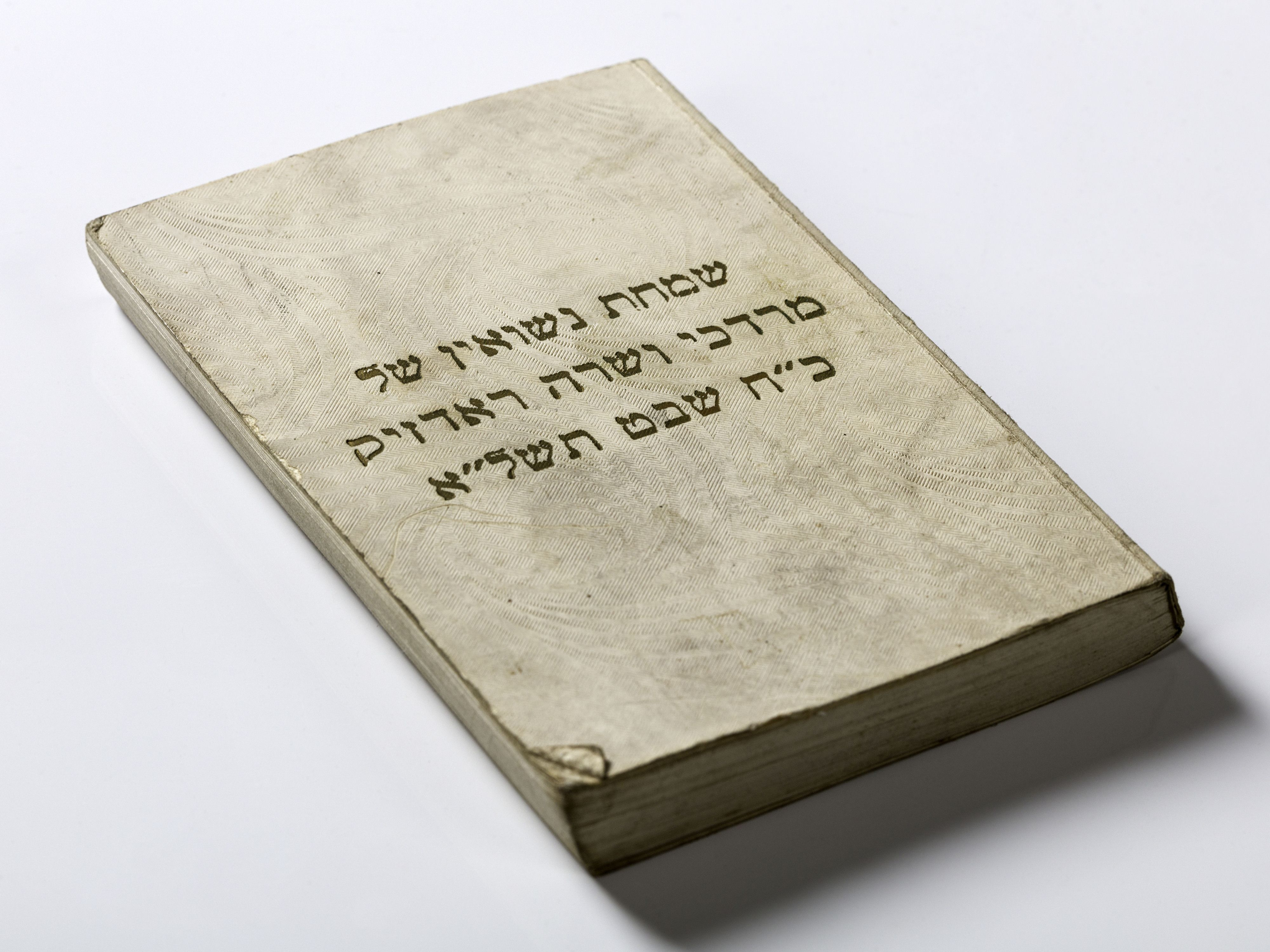
A siddur created on the occasion of a wedding in 1971, Oświęcim. Collection of the Auschwitz Jewish Center

- There are many additional liturgical variations and additions to the siddur for the Yamim Noraim (The "Days of Awe"; High Holy Days, i.e. Rosh HaShanah and Yom Kippur). As such, a special siddur has developed for just this period, known as a mahzor (also: machzor). The mahzor contains not only the basic liturgy, but also many piyyutim, Hebrew liturgical poems. Sometimes the term mahzor is also used for the prayer books for the Three Pilgrimage Festivals, Pesach, Shavuot and Sukkot.
- On Tisha b'Av, a special siddur is used that includes the text of the Book of Lamentations, the Torah and Haftarah readings for that day, and Kinnot or special mournful piyyutim for that day. This siddur is usually called "Kinot" as well. Traditionally, every year many Jews hope that the Messiah will come and the Third Temple will be rebuilt, so Tisha b'Av will not happen again. So after the fast ends, some have the tradition to place their Kinot siddurim in a geniza, or a burial place for sacred texts.

== Popular siddurim ==
Below are listed many popular siddurim used by religious Jews. This list mostly excludes prayer books specifically for the High Holidays; see Machzor (Popular versions).

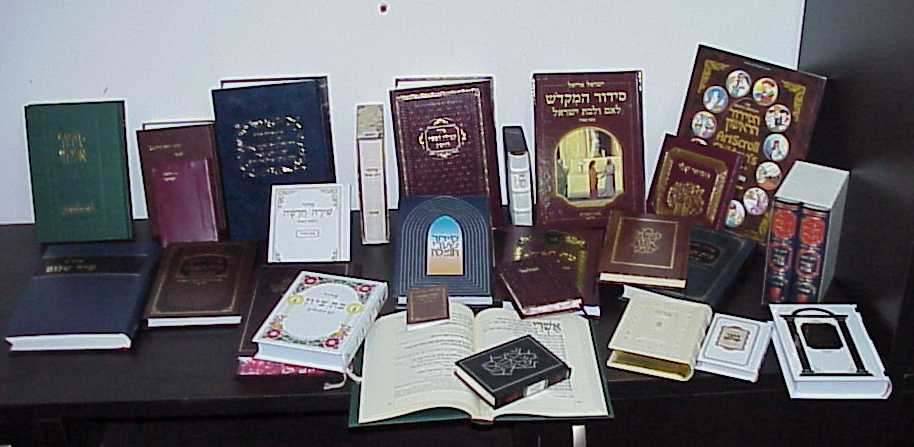
Variety of popular Siddurim.

=== Ashkenazi Orthodox ===
==== Hebrew only ====
- Siddur Saffah Berurah and Sfat Emet, also known as the Rodelheim Siddur. Edited by Wolf Heidenheim and in use in many editions for the last two hundred years, and they are still used in many Yekkish communities. In the same general family is the Siddur Avodat Yisrael, edited by Seligman Baer; the siddur contains the piyyutim for shabbatot, and there are two version containing the piyyutim of the Western and Eastern Ashkenazic rites.
- Siddur Rinat Yisrael, Hotsa'at Moreshet, Bnei Brak, Israel. (In a number of versions, popular in Israel.) This siddur provides a translation of Aramaic texts.
- Siddur Tefilas Kol Peh (Hebrew), first published 1964 by Eshkol
- Siddur Tefilas Sh'ai, Feldheim Publishers : Israel/New York
- Siddur HaGra (reflecting views of the Vilna Gaon)
- Siddur Aliyos Eliyahu (Popular among followers of the Vilna Gaon who live in Israel and abroad)
- Siddur Ezor Eliyahu - An attempt to reconstruct the actual Nusach of the Vilna Gaon
- Siddur Kol Bo

==== With English translation ====
- The Authorised Daily Prayer Book (also known as the "Hertz Siddur"), ed. Joseph Hertz. NY, Block Publ'g Co., rev. ed. 1948. (an annotated edition of "Singer's Prayer Book" of 1890)(Hebrew-English)
- Siddur Ha-Shalem (also known as the Birnbaum Siddur) Ed. Philip Birnbaum. The Hebrew Publishing Company. ISBN 0-88482-054-8 (Hebrew-English)
- Siddur Avodat HaLev, ed. Rabbi Basil Herring (the new siddur from the Rabbinical Council of America, published 2018)
- The Metsudah Siddur: A New Linear Prayer Book Ziontalis. (Hebrew-English)
- The Authorised Daily Prayer Book of the British Commonwealth, translation by Chief Rabbi Sir Jonathan Sacks (the new version of "Singer's Prayer Book") (Hebrew-English)
- The Artscroll Siddur, Mesorah Publications (multiple editions, including an interlinear translation; Hebrew, Hebrew-English, Hebrew-Russian, Hebrew-Spanish, Hebrew-French) The "great innovation" of the Artscroll was that it was the first siddur that "made it possible for even a neophyte ba’al teshuvah (returnee to the faith) to function gracefully in the act of prayer, bowing at the correct junctures, standing, sitting and stepping back" at the correct place in the service.
- Koren Sacks Siddur (Hebrew-English), Koren Publishers Jerusalem: based on latest Singer's prayer book, above (described as the first siddur to "pose a fresh challenge to the ArtScroll dominance.")
- Siddur Nehalel beShabbat, the complete Shabbat siddur in the projected siddur Nehalel series (Nevarech Press, Hebrew and English), which contain photographs juxtaposed with the text to depict its meaning and enhance kavanah, a central requirement of authentic prayer.
- A rendering of both the siddur and the entire high holy day prayer book into English rhymed verse has been made by Rabbi Dr. Jeffrey M Cohen. The Siddur in Poetry (London, Gnesia Publications, 2012) and The Machzor in Poetry (London, Gnesia Publications, 2012).

==== Other translations ====
- Siddur Siach Yitzchak (Hebrew and Dutch), Nederlands-Israelitisch Kerkgenootschap, Amsterdam 1975 (in a number of editions since 1975) ISBN 978-90-71727-04-7
- Siddur Sefat Emet, Selig Bamberger (translator) the German translation of Siddur Sfat Emet: Gebetbuch der Israeliten. Victor Goldschmidt-Verlag, Basel 1999 ISBN 3-85705-017-9 (first edition: Rödelheim 1799)

==== Hasidic or Nusach Sefard Siddurim ====
- Siddur Et Ratzon

===== Hebrew only =====
- Seder Hatefillah, Zolkeve 1781. This is the siddur of the Kloyze in Brod, and is arguably the first Nusach Sefard siddur.
- "Siddur Tefilah Yesharah," first published circa 1800, was later reprinted with the early Hasidic commentary "Keser Nehora" by Rabbi Aharon Hakohen (Katz) of Zhelichov. This became known as the "Berditchever Siddur." (The commentary received approbations from early Hasidic luminaries Rabbi Levi Yitzchok of Berditchev, the Maggid of Kozhnitz, the Seer of Lublin, and the non-Hasidic Chief Rabbi of Lublin.) The Berditchever Siddur has been reprinted many times, more recently by Rabbi Meir Yechezkel Weiner (Jerusalem 2011) and Pe’er (Kiryas Joel 2015).
- Beis Aharon V'Yisrael is the second published siddur ever produced by Karliner Chassidim. It superseded Siddur Beis Aharon V'Yisrael published by Rebbe Yochanan Perlow (1900–1956).
- Siddur Torah Or (a previous edition of the Chabad siddur).
- Siddur Tefillah La-El Chayi (Hebrew-English siddur released in 2014 with commentary based on the teachings of Nachman of Breslov)

===== With English translation =====
- The Breslov Siddur published in a 2014 hardcover edition (828 pages in length) is one of the few Hasidic siddurim available in an English language translation (and contains the original text). Translated by Avraham Sutton and Chaim Kramer. Y. Hall is the editor. ISBN 978-1928822-83-7
- Siddur Tehillat HaShem (the version currently used by Chabad), available in a Hebrew-English version. Also available in Hebrew-Russian and Hebrew-German as well as in Hebrew-French, Hebrew-Spanish and Hebrew only.
- Many publishing houses have Nusach Sefard versions of the siddur, including (among others) ArtScroll, Tefillat Kol Peh, Koren-Sacks and Rinat Yisrael. However, a number of Hasidic groups have published their own variations of Nusach Sefard, including the communities of Spinka, Bobov, Munkatch, Slonim, Vizhnitz, Biala and Boston (who use the nusach of the Berditchever Siddur with a few minor variations). Many Hasidim follow a unique version of Nusach Sefard - for example, all of the branches of Chernobyl hasidim recite ויקרב קץ משיחיה in the Kaddish. In Belz and Dushinsky, the Shemoneh Esrei (except for kedusha and a few other minor changes) is recited similarly to the Ashkenazic rite.

===== Other translations =====
- Siddur Tehillat HaShem (currently used by Chabad) is also available with a Spanish, French, Russian and German translation.

=== Italian Rite ===
- 1486 Italian Machzor. This is the first machzor of any type ever printed.
- Machzor Shadal
- The Complete Italian Rite Machazor (3 vols.)
- Mahzor Ke-Minhag Roma, ed. Robert Bonfil, Jerusalem 2012, ISBN 978-965-493-621-7
- Angelo Piattelli and Hillel Sermoneta (eds.), Seder Tefilloth ke-minhag benè Roma, Jerusalem 2014. A full set of Machzorim is also available here.

=== Romaniote Rite ===
- The Romaniote Rite, 2017/18 (a series containing the Siddur, Piyyutim, the Haftarot readings and a Haggadah according to the old Romaniote Rite
- Romaniote Machzor, Venice 1524.
- Romaniote Machzor, Venice 1665. Most of the piyyutim included in the previous edition have been eliminated.
- "Mekor Chayim: A Reform Liturgy for Erev Shabbat Based on the Romaniote Rite", Greenberg, Yonatan, Hebrew Union College-Jewish Institute of Religion, Cincinnati, 236 pages, 2018.

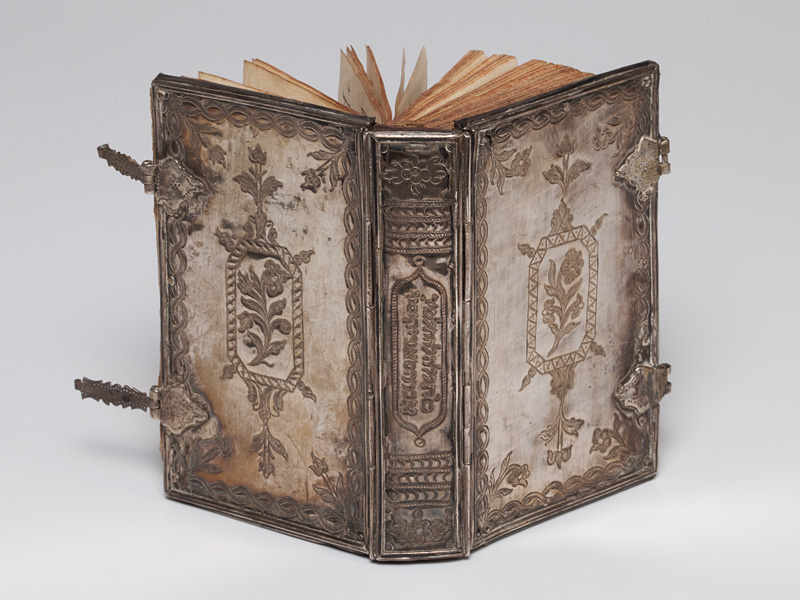
1803 Sephardic prayer book, in the Jewish Museum of Switzerland’s collection.

=== Sephardic ===
==== Israel and diaspora ====
- Siddur Rinat Yisrael Sephardic and Edot ha-Mizrach Nusach edited by Rabbi Amram Aburbeh. (Hebrew, big clear modern Hebrew fonts)

===== Israeli, following Rabbi Ovadia Yosef =====
These siddurim follow the halakha of Rabbi Ovadia Yosef (1920–2013) a Talmudic scholar, and authority on Jewish religious law, and spiritual leader of Israel's ultra-orthodox Shas party. Yosef believed that the Sephardic halakhic tradition favoured leniency, and these principles are reflected in his siddurim. please note, these siddurim are also for the Edot Ha-mizrach communities.

- Ohr V’Derech Sephardic Siddur
- Siddur Yeḥavveh Daat
- Siddur Avodat Ha-shem
- Siddur Ḥazon Ovadia
- Siddur L'maan Shmo
- Siddur Ha-Miforash Kavanat Halev

==== Sephardic Women's Siddur ====
Some notable editions are:

- Avodat Hashem -l'bat yisrael- with psalms
- Ha-Siddur Ha-Meforash Kavanat Halev -l'bat yisrael- with psalms
- Avodah Shebalev- L'bat yisrael- with psalms

==== Spanish and Portuguese Jews ====
(Characterised by relative absence of Kabbalistic elements:)

- Book of Prayer of the Spanish and Portuguese Jews’ Congregation, London. Volume One: Daily and occasional prayers. Oxford (Oxford Univ. Press, Vivian Ridler), 5725 - 1965.
- Book of Prayer: According to the Custom of the Spanish and Portuguese Jews David de Sola Pool, New York: Union of Sephardic Congregations, 1960.

==== Greek, Turkish and Balkan Sephardim ====
(Usually characterised by presence of Kabbalistic elements:)

- Mahzor LeYom Kippur-Proseuchologion tes hemeras tou Exilasmou (Hebrew-Greek) According to the Sephardic Rite of Thessalonike, Athens 1969
- Siddur Sha'arei Tefillah-Ai Pylai ton Proseuchon (Hebrew-Greek) Prayerbook for the whole year, Athens 1974
- Siddur Zehut Yosef (Daily and Shabbat) According to the Rhodes and Turkish Traditions, Hazzan Isaac Azose, Seattle, Washington: Sephardic Traditions Foundation, 2002

==== North African Jews ====
(Usually characterised by presence of Kabbalistic elements, except for the Moroccan siddurim which generally contain fewer Kabbalistic elements:)

- Siddur Od Abinu Ḥai ed. Levi Nahum: Jerusalem (Hebrew only, Livorno text, Libyan tradition)
- Mahzor Od Abinu Ḥai ed. Levi Nahum (5 vols.): Jerusalem (Hebrew only, Livorno text, Libyan tradition)
- Siddur Vezaraḥ Hashemesh, ed. Messas: Jerusalem (Hebrew only, Meknes tradition)
- Siddur Ish Matzliaḥ, ed. Mazuz, Machon ha-Rav Matzliah: B'nei Brak (Hebrew only, Djerba tradition)
- Siddur Farḥi (Hebrew with Arabic translation, Egypt)
- Siddur Tefillat ha-Ḥodesh, ed. David Levi, Erez : Jerusalem (Hebrew only, Livorno text, Moroccan, Algerian and Tunisian traditions)
- Siddur Patah Eliyahou, ed. Joseph Charbit, Colbo: Paris (Hebrew and French, Moroccan, Algerian and Tunisian traditions)
- Mahzor Zechor le-Avraham, Yarid ha-Sefarim : Jerusalem (Based on the original Zechor le-Abraham: Livorno 1926, Hebrew only, Moroccan, Algerian and Tunisian traditions, days of awe only)
- Siddur Darchei Avot (Moroccan)
- Siddur Oro shel Olam

==== Middle Eastern Mizrachim (Sephardim) ====
(Usually characterised by presence of Kabbalistic elements:)

===== Edot Ha-mizrach (Iraqi) =====
- Tefillat Yesharim: Jerusalem, Manṣur (Hebrew only)
- Siddur Od Yosef Ḥai
- Kol Eliyahu, ed. Mordechai Eliyahu
- Siddur Rinat Yisrael - (Edot Hamizrach edition), Hotsa'at Moreshet, Bnei Brak, Israel. (Hebrew)

===== Syrian =====
- The Aram Soba Siddur: According to the Sephardic Custom of Aleppo Syria Rabbi Moshe Antebi, Jerusalem: Aram Soba Foundation, 1993
- Siddur Abodat Haleb / Prayers from the Heart Rabbi Moshe Antebi, Lakewood, New Jersey: Israel Book Shop, 2002
- Kol Yaacob: Sephardic Heritage Foundation, New York, 1990.
- Bet Yosef ve-Ohel Abraham: Jerusalem, Manṣur (Hebrew only, based on Baghdadi text)
- Orḥot Ḥayim, ed. Yedid: Jerusalem 1995 (Hebrew only)
- Siddur Kol Mordechai, ed. Faham bros: Jerusalem 1984 (minhah and arbit only)
- Abir Yaakob, ed. Haber: Sephardic Press (Hebrew and English, Shabbat only)
- Orot Sephardic Siddur, Eliezer Toledano: Lakewood, New Jersey, Orot Inc. (Hebrew and English: Baghdadi text, Syrian variants shown in square brackets)
- Maḥzor Shelom Yerushalayim, ed. Albeg: New York, Sephardic Heritage Foundation 1982

=== Yemenite Jews (Teimanim) ===
==== Baladi ====
The Baladi Jews (from Arabic balad, country) follow the legal rulings of the Rambam (Maimonides) as codified in his work the Mishneh Torah. Rabbi Yiḥye Tsalaḥ (Maharits) revised this liturgy to end friction between traditionalists (who followed Rambam's rulings and the siddur as it developed in Yemen) and Kabbalists who followed the innovations of the Ari. This prayer book makes very few additions or changes and substantially follows the older Yemenite tradition as it had existed prior to this conflict.

- Siddur Tiklal, Yiḥyah Salaḥ ben Yehuda, 1800
- Siddur Shivat Tzion, Rabbi Yosef Qafih, 1950s
- Siddur Siaḥ Yerushalayim, Rabbi Yosef Qafih (5th edition, Jerusalem 2003)
- Siddur Tiklal: Torath Avoth
- Tiklal Ha-Mefoar (Maharits) Nosaḥ Baladi, Meyusad Al Pi Ha-Tiklal Im Etz Hayim Ha-Shalem Arukh K'Minhag Yahaduth Teiman: Bene Berak : Or Neriyah ben Mosheh Ozeri, [2001 or 2002]

==== Shami ====
The Shami Jews (from Arabic ash-Sham, the north, referring to Palestine or Damascus) represent those who accepted the Sephardic rite, after being exposed to new inexpensive, typeset prayer books brought from Israel and the Sephardic diaspora by envoys and merchants in the late 17th century and 18th century. The "local rabbinic leadership resisted the new versions....Nevertheless, the new prayer books were widely accepted." As part of that process, the Shami modified their rites to accommodate the usages of the Ari to the maximum extent. The text of the Shami siddur now largely follows the Sephardic tradition, though the pronunciation, chant and customs are still Yemenite in flavour.

- Siddur Tefillat HaḤodesh - Beit Yaakov, Nusaḥ Sepharadim, Teiman, and Edoth Mizraḥ
- Siddur Kavanot HaRashash, Shalom Sharabi, Publisher: Yeshivat HaChaim Ve'Hashalom

=== Minhagei Eretz Yisrael ===
- Siddur Nusach Eretz Yisrael edited by Rabbi David Bar-Hayim (Machon Shilo, "Shilo Institute") Jerusalem, Israel. (Hebrew, Minhagei Eretz Yisrael), an attempted reconstruction of the ancient Palestinian minhag from the Jerusalem Talmud, the Cairo Geniza documents and other sources.

=== Conservative Judaism ===
- Sabbath and Festival Prayer Book Ed. Morris Silverman with Robert Gordis, 1946. USCJ and RA
- Weekday Prayer Book Ed. Morris Silverman, 1956. USCJ
- Weekday Prayer Book Ed. Gershon Hadas with Jules Harlow, 1961, RA.
- Siddur Sim Shalom series of Siddurim:
  - Siddur Sim Shalom Ed. Jules Harlow. 1985, 980 pages, RA and USCJ.
  - Siddur Sim Shalom for Shabbat and Festivals Ed. Lawrence Cahan, 1998, 816 pages. RA and USCJ.
  - Siddur Sim Shalom for Weekdays Ed. Avram Israel Reisner, 2003, 576 pages. RA and USCJ.
- Siddur Va'ani Tefilati Ed. Simchah Roth, 1998, 744 pages. Israeli Masorti Movement and Rabbinical Assembly of Israel. Hebrew.
- Va'ani Tefilati: Siddur Yisre'eli Ed. Ze'ev Kenan, 2009, 375 pages. Israeli Masorti Movement and Rabbinical Assembly of Israel. Hebrew.
- Siddur Lev Yisrael Ed. Cheryl Magen, 1998, 432 pages. Camp Ramah. Hebrew.
- Siddur Lev Shalem for Shabbat and Festivals Ed. Edward Feld, 2016, 466 double pages, RA.
- Siddur Lev Shalem for Weekdays Ed. Edward Feld, 2026, RA.

=== Progressive and Reform Judaism ===
- Ha-Avodah Shebalev, The prayer book of The Israel Movement for Progressive Judaism, Ed. The Council of Israel Progressive Rabbis (MARAM), 1982
- The Companion to Ha-Avodah Shebalev published by Congregation Har-El Jerusalem in 1992 to help English-speaking immigrants and visitors; Hebrew pages from the original Ha-Avodah Shebalev, English translations from Gates of Prayer: The New Union Prayer Book with additional translations by Adina Ben-Chorin.
- Seder ha-Tefillot: Forms of Prayer: Movement for Reform Judaism, London 2008, ISBN 0-947884-13-0; ISBN 978-0-947884-13-0 Official prayer book of the Reform movement in Britain
- Liberal Jewish Prayer Book: Vol. 1 (Services for Weekdays, Sabbaths, Etc.), 1926, 1937; Vol. 2 (Services for The Day of Memorial Rosh Hashanah and The Day of Atonement), 1923, 1937; Vol. 3 (Services for Passover, Pentecost, and Tabernacles), 1926; all published by the Liberal Jewish Synagogue, London, U.K.
- Service of the Heart: Weekday Sabbath and Festival Services and Prayers for Home and Synagogue, Union of Liberal and Progressive Synagogues, London, 1967
- Vetaher Libenu: Purify Our Hearts, Congregation Beth El, Sudbury, MA 1980
- Siddur Lev Chadash, Union of Liberal and Progressive Synagogues, UK, 1995.
- Olath Tamid: Book of Prayers for Jewish Congregations, United States, R. David Einhorn, 1872 (Originally in German; English translation extant)

All of the following are published by the Central Conference of American Rabbis:

- Union Prayer Book, vol. 1 (Sabbath, Festivals, and Weekdays), 1892, 1895, 1918, 1940; vol. 2 (High Holidays), 1894, 1922, 1945
- Weekday Afternoon and Evening Services for Use in the Synagogue and the House of Mourning, 1957
- Gates of Prayer series of siddurim:
  - Gates of Prayer: The New Union Prayer Book, 1975
  - Gates of Prayer for Weekdays and at a House of Mourning, 1975
  - Gates of Prayer: Afternoon and Evening Services and Prayers for the House of Mourning, 1978
  - Gates of Prayer for Shabbat: A Gender Sensitive Prayerbook, 1992
  - Gates of Prayer for Weekdays and at a House of Mourning: A Gender Sensitive Prayerbook, 1992
  - Gates of Prayer for Weekdays: A Gender Sensitive Prayerbook, 1993
  - Gates of Prayer for Assemblies, 1993
  - Gates of Prayer for Shabbat and Weekdays: A Gender Sensitive Prayerbook, 1994
- Mishkan T'filah series of siddurim:
  - Mishkan T'filah [Tabernacle of Prayer]: A Reform Siddur: Weekdays, Shabbat, Festivals, and Other Occasions of Public Worship, 2007; ISBN 0-881231-04-5; ISBN 978-0-881231-03-8
  - Mishkan T'filah for Gatherings: A Reform Siddur, 2009
  - Mishkan T'filah for Travelers: A Reform Siddur, 2009
  - Mishkan T'filah for the House of Mourning, 2010
  - Mishkan T'filah Journal Edition, 2010
  - Mishkan T'filah for Children, 2013
  - Mishkan T'filah for Youth, 2014
  - Divrei Mishkan T'filah -- Delving into the Siddur, 2018
- Chaveirim Kol Yisrae2018il, a Siddur for Chavurot, 2000 a Project of The Progressive Chavurah Siddur Committee of Boston
- Seder ha-Tefillot: Forms of Prayer: Movement for Reform Judaism, London 2008, ISBN 0-947884-13-0; ISBN 978-0-947884-13-0 Official prayer book of the Reform movement in Britain
- Congregation Beit Simchat Torah's Siddur B'chol L'vav'cha, (With All Your Heart) for Friday night services; Publisher: Congregation Beth Simchat Torah (2008); ISBN 0-979400-90-2; ISBN 978-0-979400-90-2
- Siddur Sha'ar Zahav, the first complete prayer book to address the lives and needs of LGBTQ as well as straight Jews; 2009.
- Seder Tov Lehodot: Teksten, gebeden en diensten voor weekdagen, Sjabbat en andere gelegenheden, Amsterdam 2000, Verbond van Liberaal-Religieuze Joden in Nederland now Nederlands Verbond voor Progressief Jodendom; ISBN 90-805603-1-6

=== Reconstructionist Judaism ===
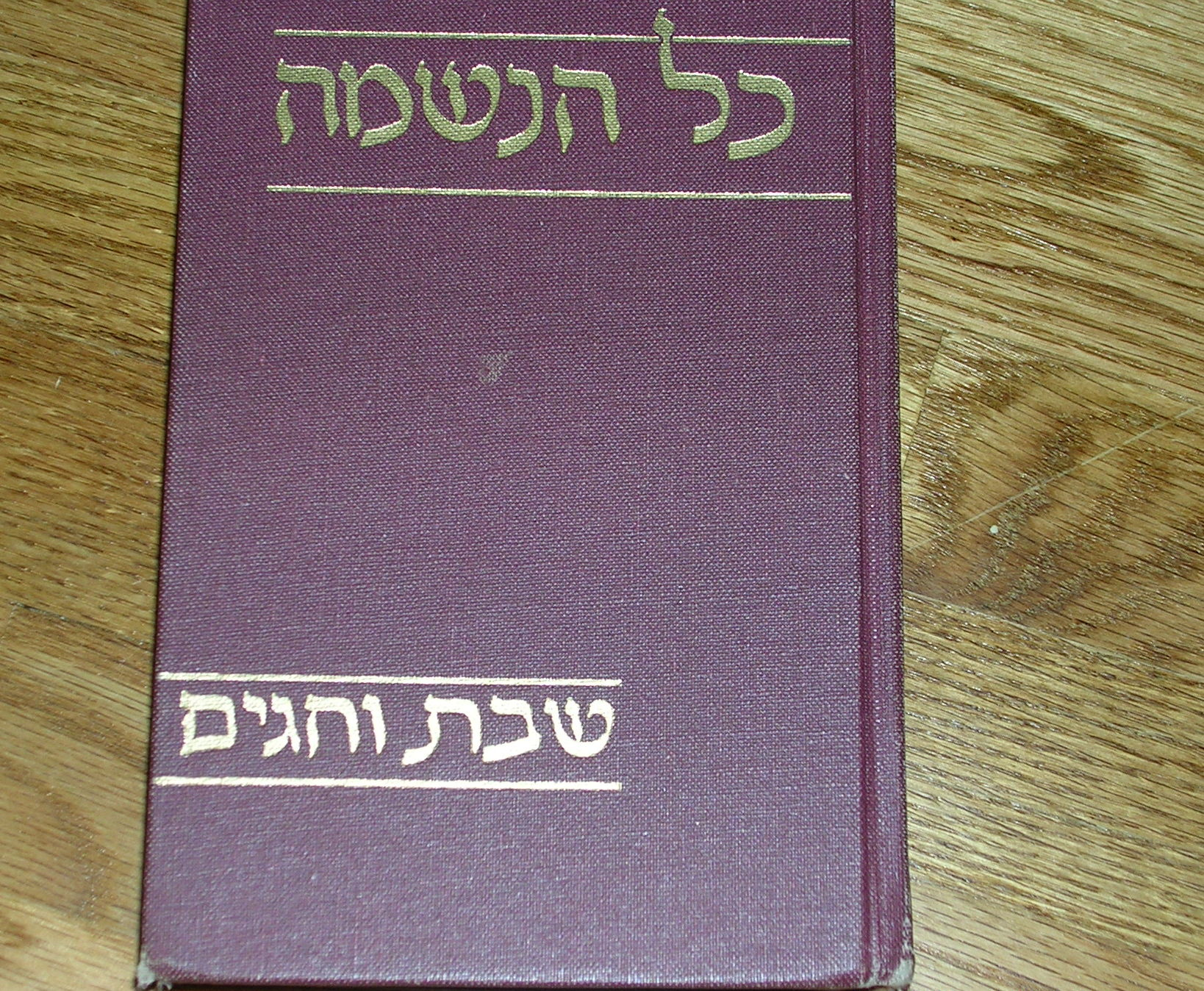
Kol Haneshamah: Shabbat Vehagim

Prayer books edited by Rabbi Mordecai Kaplan and others:

- Sabbath Prayer Book, Jewish Reconstructionist Foundation, 1945
- High Holiday Prayer Book (Vol. 1, Prayers for Rosh Hashanah; Vol. 2, Prayers for Yom Kippur), Jewish Reconstructionist Foundation, 1948
- Supplementary Prayers and Readings for the High Holidays, Jewish Reconstructionist Foundation, 1960
- Festival Prayer Book, Jewish Reconstructionist Foundation, 1958
- Daily Prayer Book, Jewish Reconstructionist Foundation, 1963
- Hadesh Yameinu (Renew our days): a book of Jewish prayer and meditation, edited and translated by Rabbi Ronald Aigen. Montreal (Cong. Dorshei Emet), 1996.

Kol Haneshamah Prayerbook series, ed. David Teutsch:

- Erev Shabbat: Shabbat Eve, Reconstructionist Press, 1989; 2nd edition, 1993
- Shirim Uvrahot: Songs, Blessings and Rituals for the Home, Reconstructionist Press, 1991, 1998
- Shabbat Vehagim: Sabbath and Festivals, Reconstructionist Press, 1994; 3rd edition (August 1, 1998)
- Limot Hol: Daily Prayerbook, Reconstructionist Press, 1996; Reprint edition (September 1, 1998)
- Mahzor Leyamim Nora'im: Prayerbook for the Days of Awe, Reconstructionist Press, 1999; Fordham University Press; Bilingual edition (May 1, 2000)
- T'filot L'veit HaEvel: Prayers for a House of Mourning, Reconstructionist Press, 2001; Jewish Reconstructionist Federation (October 10, 2001)

=== Jewish Renewal ===
- Rabbi Marcia Prager's “A Siddur for Shabbat Morning"
- Sh'ma': A Concise Weekday Siddur For Praying in English by Zalman Schachter-Shalomi, CreateSpace Independent Publishing Platform, 2010.

== Feminist siddurim ==
- Siddur Nashim: a Sabbath prayerbook for women by Naomi Janowitz and Margaret Moers Wenig; 1976.
- Siddur Birkat Shalom by the Havurat Shalom Siddur Project; Havurat Shalom, 1991.

Siddur Nashim, by Margaret Wenig and Naomi Janowitz in 1976, was the first Jewish prayer book to refer to God using female pronouns and imagery.

Reconstructionist Rabbi Rebecca Alpert (Reform Judaism, Winter 1991) commented:

The experience of praying with Siddur Nashim... transformed my relationship with God. For the first time, I understood what it meant to be made in God's image. To think of God as a woman like myself, to see Her as both powerful and nurturing, to see Her imaged with a woman's body, with womb, with breasts – this was an experience of ultimate significance. Was this the relationship that men have had with God for all these millennia? How wonderful to gain access to those feelings and perceptions.

Following in the footsteps of feminist prayerbooks, liberal prayerbooks tend increasingly to avoid male-specific words and pronouns, seeking that all references to God in translations be made in gender-neutral language. For example, the UK Liberal movement's Siddur Lev Chadash (1995) does so, as does the UK Reform Movement's Forms of Prayer (2008). In Mishkan T'filah, the American Reform Jewish prayer book released in 2007, references to God as "He" have been removed, and whenever Jewish patriarchs are named (Abraham, Isaac, and Jacob), so also are the matriarchs (Sarah, Rebecca, Rachel, and Leah).

== Humanistic and atheist siddurim ==
- Celebration: A Ceremonial and Philosophic Guide for Humanists and Humanistic Jews by Sherwin T. Wine; Prometheus Books, 1988
- A Humanistic Siddur of Spirituality and Meaning by David Rabeeya; Xlibris Corporation, 2005
- Liturgical Experiments: A Siddur for the Sceptical in Hebrew, by Tzemah Yoreh (2010?)

Yoreh writes about his work: "I think prayer is communal and private expression of hopes, fears, an appreciation of aesthetic beauty, good attributes. But that has nothing to do with God."

== Other siddurim ==
There are also some Karaite, Samaritan and Sabbatean prayer books.

== See also ==
- Siddur Rashi
- Siddur and mahzor

== Bibliography ==
- Jewish Liturgy: A Comprehensive History, Ismar Elbogen, Jewish Publication Society, 1993. This is the most thorough academic study of the Jewish liturgy ever written. Originally published in German in 1913, and updated in a number of Hebrew editions, the latest edition has been translated into English by Raymond P. Scheindlin. This work covers the entire range of Jewish liturgical development, beginning with the early cornerstones of the siddur; through the evolution of the medieval piyyut tradition; to modern prayerbook reform in Germany and the United States.
- Joseph Heinemann "Prayer in the Talmud", Gruyter, New York, 1977
- Kavvana: Directing the Heart in Jewish Prayer, Seth Kadish, Jason Aronson Inc., 1997.
- The Encyclopedia of Jewish Prayer Macy Nulman, Jason Aronson Inc.,1993. Provides in one volume information on every prayer recited in the Ashkenazi and Sephardic traditions. Arranged alphabetically by prayer, this book includes information on the prayers, their composers and development, the laws and customs surrounding them, and their place in the service.
- Jakob J. Petuchowski "Contributions to the Scientific Study of Jewish Liturgy" Ktav, New York, 1970
- Goldschmidt, Meḥqare Tefillah u-Fiyyut (On Jewish Liturgy): Jerusalem 1978
- Wieder, Naphtali, The Formation of Jewish Liturgy: In the East and the West
- Reif, Stefan, Judaism and Hebrew Prayer: Cambridge 1993. Hardback ISBN 978-0-521-44087-5, ISBN 0-521-44087-4; Paperback ISBN 978-0-521-48341-4, ISBN 0-521-48341-7
- Reif, Stefan, Problems with Prayers: Berlin and New York 2006 ISBN 978-3-11-019091-5, ISBN 3-11-019091-5
- The Artscroll Siddur, Ed. Nosson Scherman, Mesorah Publications. A popular Orthodox prayerbook with running commentary. The amount of commentary varies by version.
- The Authorised Daily Prayer Book of the British Commonwealth, translation by Rabbi Eli Cashdan. An Orthodox prayerbook widely used in the UK and other Commonwealth countries.
- Amidah, entry in the Encyclopaedia Judaica, Keter Publishing
