= List of Jewish Theological Seminary alumni =

The Jewish Theological Seminary of America has graduated a number of key figures in American and worldwide Judaism. These include:

- Bella Abzug, lawyer, Congresswoman, social activist, feminist leader
- Philip R. Alstat, rabbi, counselor, and chaplain
- Bradley Shavit Artson, dean of Ziegler School of Rabbinic Studies
- Lia Bass, one of the world's first Latin American female rabbis
- Michael Berenbaum, Holocaust scholar
- Marla Berkowitz, ASL interpreter
- Herman Berlinski, composer, organist, musicologist and choir conductor
- Joshua Bloch, rabbi and librarian
- Ben Zion Bokser, rabbi and scholar
- Jacob Bosniak, rabbi
- Daniel Boyarin, Talmud scholar at University of California at Berkeley
- Sharon Brous, founding rabbi of IKAR
- Geoffrey Claussen, scholar of ethics and theology
- Boaz Cohen, JTS professor, chairman of the Law Committee of the Rabbinical Assembly
- Gerson Cohen, Jewish historian and JTS chancellor
- Mark R. Cohen, scholar of Jewish history in the Muslim world.
- Menachem Creditor, Scholar-in-Residence of UJA-Federation NY, New York, NY, founder of Rabbis Against Gun Violence
- David G. Dalin, historian
- Moshe Davis, scholar of American Jewish history
- Elliot N. Dorff, scholar of Jewish ethics and theology, rector of American Jewish University
- Matthew Eisenfeld, student killed in the Jaffa Road bus bombings in Jerusalem
- Amy Eilberg, first female rabbi ordained in Conservative Judaism.
- Ira Eisenstein, Reconstructionist leader
- Sylvia Ettenberg, Jewish educator
- Louis Finkelstein, longtime chancellor of JTS
- Abraham Foxman, lawyer, activist, director of Anti-Defamation League
- Everett Gendler, "father of Jewish environmentalism"
- Neil Gillman, JTS professor, theologian
- Miriam Glazer-Ta'asa, Israeli politician
- Ben-Zion Gold, rabbi of Harvard Hillel
- Avraham Goldberg, Talmud professor at the Hebrew University of Jerusalem, Israel Prize laureate
- Judah Goldin, Talmud professor and dean
- Jonathan A. Goldstein, Bible scholar
- David Golinkin, professor of Jewish Law and President Emeritus of the Schechter Institute of Jewish Studies
- Robert Gordis, JTS professor and president of the Rabbinical Assembly
- Daniel Gordis, senior vice president of Shalem Center
- Arthur Green, professor at Brandeis University and rector of Hebrew College rabbinical school
- Michael Greenbaum, vice chancellor emeritus and senior advisor to the chancellor of The Jewish Theological Seminary
- Moshe Greenberg, Bible scholar, Hebrew University of Jerusalem, professor Israel Prize laureate
- Judith Hauptman, JTS professor and feminist Talmud scholar
- Shai Held, co-founder of Yeshivat Hadar
- Joseph H. Hertz, British Chief Rabbi and author; first graduate of JTS
- Arthur Hertzberg, rabbi and historian
- Gertrude Himmelfarb, historian
- Sherre Hirsch, rabbi
- Brad Hirschfield, president of National Jewish Center for Learning and Leadership
- Rachel Isaacs, first openly lesbian rabbi ordained by JTS
- Max Kadushin, rabbi and philosopher
- Ian Kagedan, Canadian public servant
- Mordechai Kaplan, philosopher, JTS professor, founder of Reconstructionist Judaism
- William E. Kaufman, Conservative rabbi and Jewish theologian
- Elie Kaunfer, co-founder of Yeshivat Hadar
- Charles E. H. Kauvar, rabbi
- Dorothy K. Kripke, Jewish educator
- Myer S. Kripke, rabbi and philanthropist
- Irwin Kula, president of CLAL, National Jewish Center for Learning and Leadership
- Harold Kushner, rabbi and author of When Bad Things Happen to Good People
- Aaron Landes, rabbi, rear admiral in the United States Naval Reserve
- Naomi Levy, rabbi, author and speaker.
- Lee I. Levine, historian
- Alan Lew, rabbi and meditation teacher
- Albert L. Lewis, rabbi
- David Lieber, former president of the University of Judaism
- Abraham Lubin, cantor
- Julius B. Maller, educator and sociologist
- Hershel Matt, rabbi and Reconstructionist Rabbinical College professor
- Liati Mayk-Hai, singer-songwriter, visual artist, poet, athlete
- Jackie McCullough, gospel musician
- Marshall Meyer, rabbi and human rights activist
- Jacob Milgrom, Biblical scholar, professor at University of California, Berkeley
- Sidney Morgenbesser, philosopher, Dewey Professor at Columbia University
- Yochanan Muffs, professor of the Bible and religion at the Jewish Theological Seminary
- Abraham A. Neuman, rabbi, historian, president of Dropsie College
- Jacob Neusner, rabbinics scholar, professor at Bard College
- Daniel S. Nevins, rabbi and rabbinical school dean
- David Novak, scholar of Jewish philosophy, law, and ethics
- Peter W. Ochs, philosopher and theologian
- Norman Podhoretz, Editor, Commentary magazine
- Chaim Potok, author and rabbi
- Jacob Pressman, rabbi and co-founder of American Jewish University
- Einat Ramon, first Israeli-born woman ordained as a rabbi
- Paula Reimers, rabbi and activist
- Arnold E. Resnicoff, military chaplain and consultant to military and civilian leaders
- Joel Roth, scholar of Talmud and Jewish law and former dean of the JTS rabbinical school
- Simchah Roth, Israeli rabbi and scholar
- Steven Rubenstein, anthropologist
- Samuel Schafler, president of Hebrew College, superintendent of the Chicago Board of Jewish Education
- Ismar Schorsch, Jewish historian and JTS chancellor
- Michael Schudrich, Chief Rabbi of Poland
- Harold M. Schulweis, rabbi and theologian
- Shalom H. Schwartz, Professor of Psychology at the Hebrew University of Jerusalem, Israel Prize laureate
- Shuly Rubin Schwartz, American Jewish historian
- Seymour Siegel, scholar of ethics and theology
- Abraham Skorka, Argentine biophysicist, rabbi and author
- Mychal Springer, rabbi
- Ira F. Stone, rabbi, scholar of the Musar movement, professor at Reconstructionist Rabbinical College
- Henrietta Szold, founder of Hadassah
- Jeffrey H. Tigay, Bible scholar, University of Pennsylvania professor
- Ethan Tucker, co-founder of Yeshivat Hadar
- Gordon Tucker, philosopher, legal scholar, and former dean of the JTS rabbinical school
- Henrietta Szold, founder of Hadassah
- Burton Visotzky, rabbi and scholar of midrash
- Max Vorspan, rabbi and historian
- Mordecai Waxman, rabbi, Temple Israel of Great Neck
- Raysh Weiss, rabbi
- David Weiss Halivni, Talmud scholar, recipient of the Bialik Prize for Jewish Thought, Israel Prize laureate
- David Wolpe, rabbi of Sinai Temple, Los Angeles
- Esther Zweig, composer
