= Seymour Siegel =

American rabbi

Rabbi Seymour Siegel

Personal life
- Born: 1927 New York
- Died: 1988 (aged 60–61)

Religious life
- Religion: Judaism
- Ordination: Jewish Theological Seminary of America

Jewish leader
- Present post: Executive Director, U.S. Holocaust Memorial Council
- Previous post: Professor, Jewish Theological Seminary

Seymour Siegel (September 12, 1927 – February 24, 1988), often referred to as "an architect of Conservative Jewish theology," was an American Conservative rabbi, a Professor of Ethics, and Theology at the Jewish Theological Seminary of America (JTS), the 1983–1984 Executive Director of the United States Holocaust Memorial Council," and an advisor to three American presidents, Richard Nixon, Gerald Ford, and Ronald Reagan.

Siegel was associated with JTS for 41 years, first as a student and later as an instructor, holding the Ralph Simon Professor of Ethics and Theology chair, succeeding his friend and mentor, Abraham Joshua Heschel, in that position. He was an advocate on political conservatism, delivering a prayer at the 1973 second term inauguration of President Richard Nixon, but just as strong a champion of religious causes sometimes associated with liberalism, such as the ordination of female rabbis. In his obituary, New York Times religion writer, Ari L. Goldman, wrote that the writings of Seymour Siegel "helped open the door for the ordination of female rabbis" in the Conservative movement.

== Life and work ==
Seymour Siegel was born in Chicago, Illinois, attending the University of Chicago (B.A., 1958) and the Hebrew Theological College for undergraduate studies, then received rabbinic ordination, and both a Masters and Doctorate in Hebrew Literature at JTS (M.A., 1951; DHL, 1960), in New York City. He remained at JTS, as a Professor of Theology and Ethics, and over the years, held other positions for varying amounts of time, including Dean of Students ("Registrar") for the Rabbinical School, and assistant dean of the Herbert H. Lehman Institute of Ethics. From 1973–1980, he served as chair of the Committee on Jewish Law and Standards of the Rabbinical Assembly (RA). He also served on the Commission on the Ideology of Conservative Judaism—later renamed, The Commission on the Philosophy of Conservative Judaism—that produced the 1988 document, Emet Ve'Emunah: Statement of Principles of Conservative Judaism.

Siegel grew up in a "close-knit Yiddish family and community," with "his yeshiva education preparing him to be an orthodox rabbi or Talmudic scholar. But after graduating from the University of Chicago, he gravitated toward the Conservative movement. There, his friends, Samuel Dresner and Wolfe Kelman, urged him to study with Heschel."

As a teacher, Siegel was ahead of his time in many ways. He taught Holocaust studies in the mid-1960s, well before it was considered a field of serious study, and he was a pioneer in the field of medical ethics in particular, and religious ethics in general. He believed that teaching should not be confined to the classroom, and shared Heschel's "conviction that the Jews had a vision of society which could and should influence general society as much as the general society influenced Judaism.". Putting these beliefs into practice, he became one of the first ethical advisors to American commercial corporations, chairing the ethics committee of the public relations firm, Ruder Finn and serving on the Biohazards Committee of the giant pharmaceutical concern, Hoffmann-La Roche. As part of this position, he worked on guidelines in recombinant DNA research.

Siegel felt a tremendous responsibility, in his role as a Professor of Ethics and Theology at the Jewish Theological Seminary, to be both a general public servant serving the public of the United States of America from his understanding of the teachings of Judaism and at the same time a servant to the Jewish people in his role as the chairman of the Committee on Jewish Law and Standards of the Rabbinic Assembly.

The well-known scholar Jacob Neusner recalls that Siegel was his "best Talmud teacher" at JTS., and a generation of rabbis praised Siegel's "full control" of the broad range of classical Jewish texts, ranging from Talmud, to Jewish law, to Jewish mysticism, along with his ability to explain difficult issues in clear and straightforward ways. He was called "the most versatile and well-rounded scholar at the Jewish Theological Seminary."

In addition to his positions at JTS, and his work with the RA, Siegel served as a visiting senior research fellow at the Kennedy Institute for Bioethics at Georgetown University (1976–1977); a visiting scholar at the Woodrow Wilson International Center for Scholars (1981), in Washington, DC; a Hastings Center Fellow; and a Fellow for the Society of Religion in Higher Education. He also served, 1982–1983, as the only cleric on the President's Commission for the Study of Ethical Problems in Medicine and Biomedical Research, appointed to that Commission by President Ronald Reagan. In addition, Siegel served on the boards of directors of numerous organizations, including the Jewish Institute for National Security Affairs (JINSA) and the Jewish Publication Society (JPS), and on the editorial boards of many journals and periodicals, including This World and Conservative Judaism.

In 1951, JTS chancellor Louis Finkelstein arranged for Martin Buber to make his first trip to the U.S., for a six-month lecture tour. Finkelstein appointed Siegel to act as the host for Buber and his wife, Pauline, during their time at JTS. Siegel met them at Idlewild Airport (now John F. Kennedy International Airport) on Nov 1, 1951. Twenty four years later, at the memorial service held for Buber in New York, Siegel would be one of three speakers, including Protestant theologian, Paul Tillich.

In 1962, Siegel helped found the Seminario Rabinico Latinoamericano, Latin American Rabbinical Seminary, in Buenos Aires, Argentina, and "was instrumental in consolidating the relationship" between that seminary and JTS, in NY, by spending summers there, teaching courses in Talmud, theology, and ethics. At a news conference after a ten-week trip to Buenos Aires to help set up the Seminary, he spoke out about the fear of the Argentinian Jewish community regarding the antisemitism it faced. He said that "...reliable sources say that [the Argentinian] Government officials know who perpetrate the anti-Semitic attacks and yet they have not taken any steps to arrest them." He urged the U.S. government to do whatever it could to strengthen democratic institutions in Argentina, and expressed his concern that the Roman Catholic Church there had taken no official stand against anti-semitic attacks. "The rabbi, who said he had witnessed the machine-gunning of an Israeli shipping line while he was in Buenos Aires, said that such attacks were a recurrence of anti-Semitic acts that date back more than thirty years." Siegel was fluent in Spanish, and during some New York political campaigns, delivered speeches in Spanish to Hispanic groups on New York's Upper West Side. In 1965, when a Spanish-language Conservative prayerbook was printed for Argentina and other countries in Latin America, one of Siegel's prayers—for the Jewish festival of Sukkot, Tabernacles—was included. The prayerbook—the first new translation of a Jewish prayerbook into Spanish since the original Spanish translation had appeared in Ferrara, Italy, in 1552—was a project of the Latin American office of the World Council of Synagogues. Among other Spanish publications of the council was a translation of The Jewish Dietary Laws, written by Siegel and his colleague, Rabbi Samuel Dresner.

During the 1960s, when there was heated debate among rabbis, including those in the RA, about whether or not to engage in Jewish-Christian dialogue, Siegel was a strong voice for its importance, stating flatly that "we must have dialogue." In addition, he was one of the first rabbis to teach at Christian seminaries. In 1967, when the debate about interfaith dialogue had reached new heights, with some rabbis taking the position that it might be appropriate for Christian and Jewish leaders to discuss issues of "social justice," but not "theology," Siegel once again took a strong position in favor of religious dialogue. He wrote that such dialogue "is imperative today in a world whose vexatious problems are of immediate urgency to Christians and Jews alike," that it would be impossible to come together for discussions about social problems "in depth, without getting down to religion"—and, more than that, that it would be "ludicrous for religious leaders to meet for the purpose of discussing all subjects except the one in which they are most expert -- religion." Later, in 1984, after Jewish-Christian dialogue had developed in many circles, Siegel, ahead of his time, said that he hoped that such dialogue would grow to include Islam—and even more, that the so-called "Western religions" of Judaism, Christianity, and Islam, which were for the most part "woefully ignorant" of other religions in the world, including those in Asia and Africa, could develop opportunities to come together in dialogue, as well. Siegel said that, while religion was often a force in war, in could be a force for peace for two primary reasons: first, because it could keep alive the vision of the prophets of a time of future peace; and second, because religion could bring with it a vision that transcended national borders and races, so that it became possible to identify with others as "persons." On the other hand, while he was a strong advocate of interfaith dialogue and cooperation, he cautioned against underestimating or blurring the differences among religions. Addressing one issue of Jewish-Christian relations, he wrote, "The two covenants -- Judaism and Christianity -- are like two parallel lines which will meet in eternity. Until that time, we remain separate, but respectful and loving of each other."

During the mid-1960s, he was also the founding rabbi of the "West Side Chevre Shas," a New York Upper West Side Talmud study group that attracted some of the luminaries of the New York Jewish world, members of their families, and special guests. The group met weekly, on Shabbat, the Jewish Sabbath, for three decades, rotating among the homes of the participants. During the two years Siegel was in Washington, DC, with the U.S. Holocaust Memorial Council, Rabbi David Weiss Halivni led the group, but otherwise, from its founding to Siegel's death, he led the group. The group held their annual Tikkun Leil Shavuot session (all night study during the night of the Jewish Festival of Shavuot), at Siegel's home. In addition to this group, he hosted a weekly Saturday-morning Shabbat egalitarian worship service for JTS students when no egalitarian service (where male and female students participated equally in all aspects of worship) was conducted at JTS. Affectionately referred to as "Siegel's Shtiebel," from the Yiddish term for a "little house" used for study and prayer, it was a time for students to pray, to learn together, to enjoy Siegel's home cooking (he was an excellent cook, preparing his Sabbath specialty, cholent, for the group), and his singing (he loved music, and could give a "note perfect rendition" of "vintage cantorial records" or old "Hasidic delights").

In 1967, Siegel represented the Jewish community (and the Jewish faith) as the only rabbi to participate in an historic conference convened by the United States Navy, co-sponsored by the Chief of Chaplains, U.S. Navy, and the Commander, U.S. Submarine Force, U.S. Atlantic Fleet, on the subject of lay ministry. Under the best circumstances, many officers and sailors in the U.S. Navy are out of range of chaplains, but with new nuclear submarine technology enabling submarines to stay under water and virtually out of communication with anyone who could offer religious support almost indefinitely (the only limiting factor was how much food could be stored for the crew), new religious support questions had been raised. As a result, the Navy convened the conference in order to learn ways that lay people—military "lay leaders"—could be better trained, prepared, and supported for their roles in providing opportunities for worship, or supporting other forms of religious requirements in the absence of ordained clergy, and even in the absence of communication with them for months at a time. The conference also included discussions of the religious views of each faith group vis-a-vis ecumenical and interfaith prayer. The goal of the conference was to come up with an experimental approach that "will be made in POLARIS submarines, but later application will be made in the entire Naval establishment."

Siegel's many involvements in religion, education, and politics, took him around the world. In contrast with his early visit to Vietnam during his time as an anti-war activist, he later traveled to Moscow in 1967, at the request of President Nixon, to deliver a packet and a personal message to Llewellyn Thompson, the U.S. Ambassador to the Soviet Union. As a result of his friendship with the Korean-born Japanese professor, Jacob Teshima, a doctoral student of Heschel's, he traveled to Japan to make presentations to the Japanese pro-Zionist group, Makuya. Siegel was one of the readers of Teshima's 1977 doctoral dissertation comparing Zen Buddhism and Hasidic Judaism.

A prolific writer, Siegel was the author of hundreds of articles, and the editor of two books, "Conservative Judaism and Jewish Law," and "God in the Teachings of Conservative Judaism." His works were extremely diverse, ranging from scholarly papers on religious law, especially in terms of its relation to theology and ethics—including biomedical ethics, and Holocaust theology, to a community guide he co-wrote on kashrut, Jewish religious dietary practices, for the United Synagogue, and the teacher's guide (dealing with "conceptual issues") for the religious school book on prayer, When a Jew Prays. He was featured on the JTS Eternal Life television series in 1981, giving a presentation on "The Days of Awe: Their Significance and Relevance." At the time of his death, he was writing a third book, Medical Ethics in a Jewish Perspective.

=== Political conservative and religious liberal ===
==== From the political left to political right ====
Siegel was always active politically, believing—like Heschel—that religion and faith must be translated into action. But Siegel's actions were also linked to a philosophical belief in the integral link between ethics and politics:

...though his interest in ethics was primary, his overall view of politics was clearly linked to his interest in ethics. He agreed with Aristotle's opinion in the Politics (1253a and then again in 1278b) that "the human being is by nature a political animal." As a student of Leo Strauss at the University of Chicago, Rabbi Siegel found politics, and especially political philosophy, to be inherently linked to human life. Rabbi Siegel's unique view of Jewish ethics, theology, political philosophy, and politics, helped shape American Judaism through a crucial period in the 1960s through the 1980s and has left an important legacy....

In the 1960s he often sided with liberal causes, participating in anti-Vietnam War rallies, and marches during the Civil Rights Movement, including the Selma to Montgomery marches in Alabama, a march that included both Martin Luther King Jr. and Abraham Joshua Heschel. Siegel's view was that Jews should take an active role in the civil rights movement, because "the historic struggle against prejudice faced by Jewish people led to a natural sympathy for any people confronting discrimination." In 1966, at a conference on "Judaism and World Peace," sponsored by The Synagogue Council of America, he spoke strongly against the war in Vietnam. Later, in 1969, he traveled to Vietnam as part of a group of nine Americans, to investigate prison conditions, and charges of South Vietnamese mistreatment of prisoners. They met with and interviewed prison wardens, Buddhist citizens, students, journalists, South Vietnamese political leaders, and U.S. Ambassador Ellsworth Bunker, registering their strong unhappiness with what they witnessed and learned. He also traveled to the Soviet Union as one of the earliest Jewish American visitors to "share the anguish of his brethren," before the U.S. Jewish community mobilized in support of Soviet Jewry.

However, after the Columbia University protests of 1968, when students took over college buildings; when support of religious quotas grew stronger among many liberals; and when he saw what he viewed as support for leftist governments on the part of "McGovern Democrats," Siegel moved to the political right, coming to believe "that unbridled liberalism was a threat to Jewish rights." Additionally, Siegel's struggle with both the lessons of the Holocaust and theological responses to it, increased his concern about what he viewed as the way liberals focused on principles at the expense of reality. He was deeply affected by the writings of Emil Fackenheim, who spoke of a post-Auschwitz theology, where Jews were commanded to survive in this world, despite the threat from enemies like the Nazis, even if that meant taking actions for their own good rather than "sacrificing Jewish existence on the altar of humanity." Siegel wrote how this philosophy militated against liberalism, and demanded a more conservative approach:

Liberals often allow themselves to be led by abstract principles while they ignore specific fact. After Auschwitz, Siegel argued, this can not be permitted to happen. Jews could never fall prey again to the lure "of schemes for social betterment that take no notion of reality, and of the tendency to set aside law because the law-breaker means well."

One concrete example of this approach for Siegel was his position on what he considered the liberal position of supporting zero-population growth, even at a time when the Jewish population had suffered such tremendous losses as a result of the Holocaust. Consequently, he wrote that individuals who felt that the world or their nations suffered from over-population should feel free to "practice whatever limitations on growth they prefer." However, "those who feel there are too few of 'their kind', rather than too many" (such as the Jewish community after the loss of six million), "may prefer to follow the Biblical injunction, be fruitful and multiply."

Additionally, he felt that the establishment of the State of Israel, alongside new freedoms in nations like the United States, argued for a "post-liberal" philosophy of politics, and even a "post-liberal" theology of covenant. It was one thing, he believed, to concentrate on liberal abstract principles when Jews did not have any power to put ideas into practice, speaking of values "under conditions of powerlessness." Now, however, Jews had to grapple with "concrete reality, including the reality of politics" — which meant, for him, an abandonment of arguments based on ideals that ignored decisions that affected men and women today.

By 1969, as a result of his observations and reflections, Siegel had begun to move away from and repudiate many of his former positions. In 1972, he wrote an op-ed for The New York Times that began, "I have never voted for a Republican presidential candidate. This year I shall vote for President Nixon." With that editorial, Siegel announced his changing political allegiance, and his involvement soon earned him the title of "rabbi of the neo-conservatives," "forging close ties with the movement's major thinkers, like Irving Kristol, Michael Novak, and Norman Podhoretz." He later served on the Advisory Council of the Republican National Committee, and as president of "The American Jewish Forum," an organization created in an attempt to integrate some traditional Jewish concepts with more conservative political beliefs. He also served as an associate editor for "Ideas: A Journal of Contemporary Jewish Thought," a "right-wing Jewish journal", and was an advisor in the political campaigns of James Buckley, Richard Nixon, Gerald Ford, and Perry Duryea. Siegel's influence among Republican leaders can be seen by the way President Ronald Reagan quoted him in a 1984 speech to B'nai B'rith, regarding the return to faith among American Jews as part of a search for more meaning in their lives, a fact that Reagan saw in many Americans of all backgrounds, who were returning to faith as "a source of strength, comfort, and meaning."

He argued for change in what he called the strict separation of church and state, arguing instead for "religious accommodation," supporting basic religious values without favoring one religion over another, and so was a supporter of government aid for private schools that included religious institutions, and cautioned the Jewish community against taking too strong a stand against "the long tradition" of prayer in school, as long as the prayers were inclusive and neutral, the position sometimes characterized as "benevolent neutrality." For instance, he wrote in 1978:

In sum, the fight for "separation' of church and state may have been a good and just one in past decades. New realities and plain common sense should now move us to allow the government to do what the original framers of the Constitution intended: to found a commonwealth based on religious foundations, without favoring any one particular sect or faith-community.

As Siegel's views became more politically conservative, especially in terms of his support of Nixon over McGovern, praising Nixon's support for Israel, and his views of American involvement in Vietnam—changing from an appeal for withdrawal to a belief that we should pursue victory, in an effort to "crush communist aggression"—his long-time relationship with Heschel became strained. When Siegel was one of the rabbis who wrote an article in The New York Times supporting Nixon, Heschel wrote an "indignant" letter about the views of these "former students of his, which "depressed me deeply." The tension introduced into the relationship never led to a final break, and it was Siegel who led the graveside service for Heschel's death in 1972.

==== Religious left ====
However, despite his link to politically conservative thinkers and political leaders, Siegel remained a champion of religious causes that were often associated with "religious liberals." He taught that whenever Jewish law and Jewish ethics were in conflict, law must be tested, challenged, and even "reevaluated" in terms of the ethical principles. He put this into Jewish religious terms when he said that, in a sense, "The halakhah [religious law] is constantly reevaluated by the aggadah [the non-legalistic texts]." In other words, as Jewish theologian Eugene Borowitz described Siegel's thinking, Siegel "would start with the full panoply of Jewish observance and invoke a transcendent aggadic purpose only as he felt halakhah clashed with it"—but when that "clash" did occur, Siegel's position would be that "what Jewish tradition teaches us God wants of us as persons and as a community must be the criterion of our understanding of Jewish duty today."

Siegel served as member or chair of the Rabbinical Assembly's Committee on Jewish Law and Standards (CJLS) for more than ten years. Under his leadership as CJLS Chair, the committee issued a number of landmark rulings, including the 1973 decision that women could be counted in a minyan, the traditional quorum required for many Jewish prayers, in Conservative synagogues. "The reasons for excluding women in the past are no longer valid today," he wrote, with the press reporting that Siegel "led the fight for the resolution." Most scholars of the movement believe that it was that decision that laid the groundwork for the decision, ten years later, to ordain female rabbis. Siegel also authored the Conservative movement's decision on abortion, writing that "the fetus possesses a human dimension" and must be protected, but not at the cost of the health—physical or mental—of the mother. Because the mother's health took precedence over that of the "potential life" of the fetus, Judaism would permit abortion under certain circumstances. His view of the permissibility of abortion began with the law, but included a demand for sensitivity in its application. As one writer described his position: "Siegel is staunchly against abortion on demand...[but] allows for abortion in cases of great need."

A 1979 New York Magazine article on "The Most Powerful Rabbis in New York," described what many saw as his unusual combination of political conservatism and religious liberalism:,

Rabbi Siegel sees nothing inconsistent in his advocacy of a Jewish political shift toward conservatism as well as liberalized religious practices, such as the ordination of women as rabbis and their inclusion in the traditionally male minyan, the prayer quorum of ten.
The late 1960s marked a period of deep political disillusionment for Rabbi Siegel, who since his youth in Chicago had dabbled in Democratic party politics. Having marched in civil-rights demonstrations with Dr. Martin Luther King Jr., he recoiled when black politicians began to urge racial quotas. The Columbia University riots, which he witnessed from his seminary office across the street, and the rise of what he felt was an accommodationalist philosophy toward left-wing governments by McGovern Democrats caused Rabbi Siegel "to reassess political liberalism as an automatic Jewish reaction," he says. "The weakness of liberalism in the face of attacks on the very roots of democracy became apparent. Jewish self-interest demanded a more conservative position."

==== Ethical Realist ====
Ultimately, Siegel answered the question about his move to the political right and the religious left through the concept of realism:

The besetting error of liberal political thinking is the tendency to see issues in non-realistic terms. To make real and meaningful political choices is to make choices between real alternatives, not desired alternatives. You choose between real options; not imagined or idealized ones....So the more realistic moralist would seek options other than the trendy sloganeering of the liberals. The same is true regarding the halakhic problems facing us. It is not the exact halakhic [Jewish legal] norms that should be primary but the goals of the Law, indeed of Judaism, which are to follow the derekh haShem (the way of the Lord), la'asot tzedakah umishpat (to do righteousness and justice).

According to his former student, Rabbi Richard Freund, "...one of the most profound influences upon Siegel's formulation of ethical realism was Reinhold Niebuhr, and both Siegel and Niebuhr "moved from idealism to realism in all areas of their religious, social and political lives and writings precisely as they reached their forties and fifties, and both drew important lessons from the school of philosophy known as "American pragmatism."

Siegel's mix of idealism and realism can be seen in his approach to the State of Israel. He was a staunch defender of Israel, but "refused to equate the present State of Israel with the biblical Promised Land." He was critical of both extreme positions regarding Israel: those who did not hesitate to attack the State in the public forum, labeling the idea of a man-made Jewish homeland a "Zionist heresy"; and those who argued that it should never be criticized, because it was created as part of God's will:

We can be thankful for the "Zionist heresy." It saved the Jewish body and the Jewish soul. It made possible Jewish autonomy and Jewish creativity. But it did not bring redemption.... [I]t should be welcomed. But it becomes dangerous when it assumes messianic pretensions.

=== U.S. Holocaust Memorial Council ===
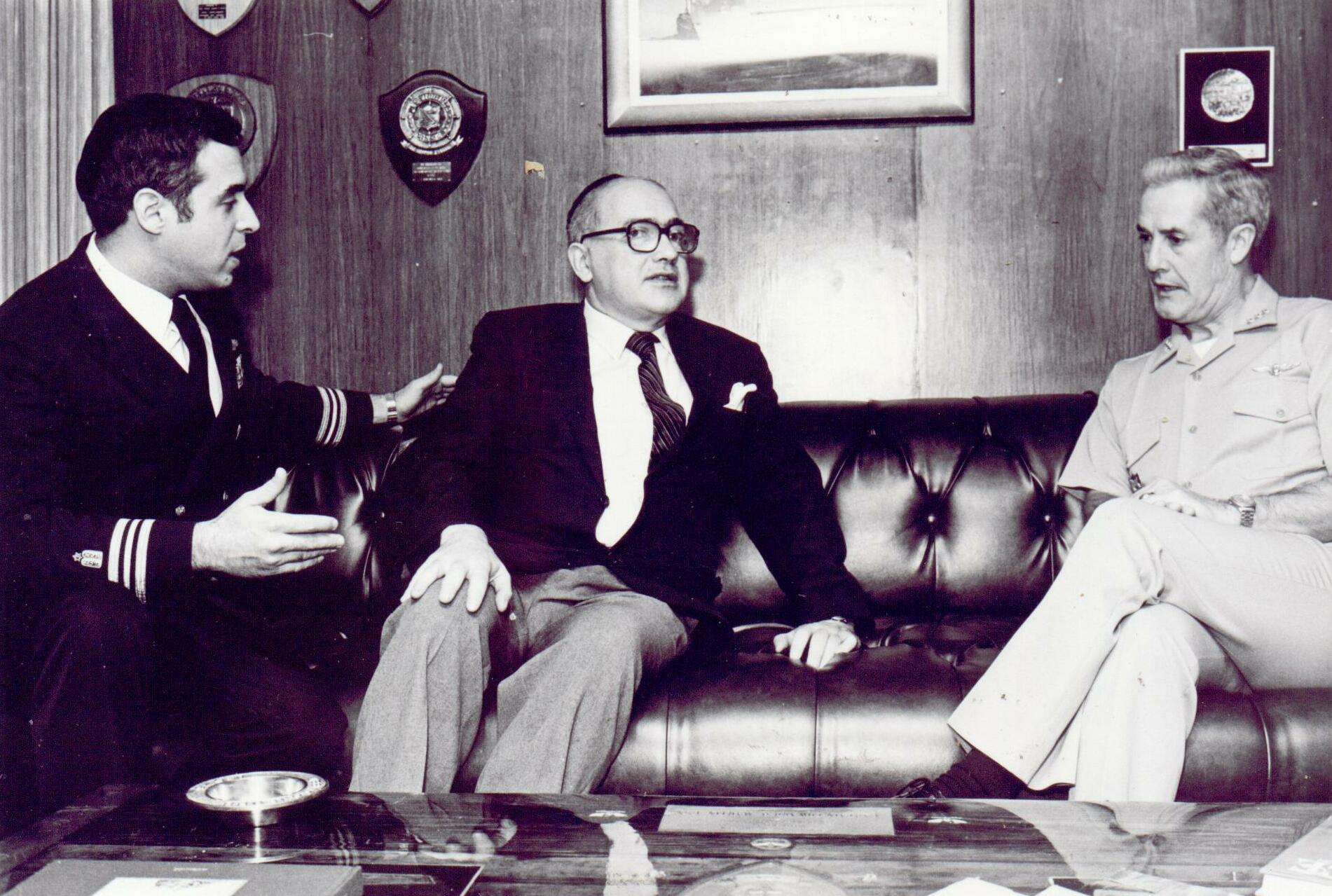
Rabbi Seymour Siegel (center), then Executive Director of the U.S. Holocaust Memorial Council, meets with Sixth Fleet Commander, Vice Admiral Edward Martin (right), and Assistant Sixth Fleet Chaplain Arnold Resnicoff (left), to discuss the participation of U.S. Navy Sixth Fleet ships in the U.S. annual Days of Remembrance of the Victims of the Holocaust. USS Puget Sound, Gaeta, Italy, 1984.

As the Executive Director of the United States Holocaust Memorial Council from 1983-1984 (the second individual to hold that position), he worked to organize the U.S. effort to remember and memorialize the Holocaust through the United States Holocaust Memorial Museum, including its programs of outreach and education, and the Days of Remembrance of the Victims of the Holocaust (DRVH). He remained on the Council following his two-year term as director, but it was during his time in that position that he began the successful effort to raise funds for the museum's creation. Additionally, during his time as director, he was involved in some very difficult negotiations (and some would say, confrontations) with groups such as the Romani, who objected to the fact that there was no one from their community on the council that would plan a Holocaust Museum, despite the number of gypsies killed during that era. He also addressed the controversial issue as to whether the Holocaust would be remembered as a particular event, primarily targeting Jews—and therefore, linked to anti-semitism-or in larger "universal" terms, remembering the evils of genocide. Here, he avoided either extreme, stating that the choice was not "either-or," but both:

The report of the Commission (the legal predecessor of the current Council), which our distinguished chairman, Elie Wiesel, submitted to the President, specifically stated: “The universality of the Holocaust lies in its uniqueness: the event is essentially Jewish, its interpretation is universal.”

This statement informs the philosophy of the work of the Council. The projected Holocaust Museum will be concerned with the Jewish tragedy. It is unique in the annals of human history. However, as with all gravely momentous events, the particular illuminates the universal aspects of human existence. It is through contemplation of the Jewish Holocaust that some insights are gained about the inhumanity of man to man.

In 1984, Siegel actively supported the decision to include the American military in DRVH programs. At the recommendation of Sixth Fleet Chaplain, Rabbi Arnold Resnicoff, a former student of Siegel's, he traveled to Gaeta, Italy, to meet with Resnicoff and with Vice Admiral Edward Martin, the Commander of the United States Sixth Fleet. With Siegel's support, they planned the 1984 DRVH ceremony on board the USS Puget Sound (AD-38), the Sixth Fleet flagship, the first Holocaust memorial ceremony ever held aboard a U.S. Navy ship. Admiral Martin himself delivered the keynote address during the ceremony. Martin, who had been a prisoner of war for more than five years in Vietnam, spoke of his admiration for the men and women who could survive the barbarity and evils of the Holocaust, and yet accept the challenge, and even the "commandment," to hold on to faith—and hope—for a better future. Additionally he spoke of the "inalienable rights" that no government on earth can deny.

=== Challenge to the Committee on Jewish Laws and Standards (CJLS) ===
The publicity surrounding the 1973 decision regarding the option for Conservative synagogues to count women toward the minyan led to greater interest on the part of members of the movement in its legal process and decisions. As one writer put it:

The enthusiastic response to the publicity surrounding the minyan decision led Conservative leaders to make more decisions of the CJLS to Conservative laity. The RA published digests of actions taken on kashrut, on the role of women, and on Shabbat and festivals. In 1977, it issued an important volume of essays, Conservative Judaism and Jewish Law, edited by Seymour Siegel with Elliott Gertel, to dispel the notion that "there really is no philosophy of Jewish law within the Conservative movement."

During Siegel's chairmanship of the CJLS, not every Conservative rabbi was happy with the committee's decisions, or with the increased availability of those decisions to congregational members, especially decisions in the area of the rights and responsibilities of women. The disagreements came to a head in 1976, when a resolution was introduced at the annual Rabbinical Assembly convention, to restructure the CJLS, and limit its scope in many ways.

Those behind the resolution contended that the decisions of the CJLS "detracted from each rabbi's religious authority in his own congregation." In calling for the defeat of the resolution, Siegel said that the local rabbi would always be the final authority in matters related to Jewish law, including the decision as to whether an individual congregation would count a woman in the minyan, but that the committee had a crucial role to play in the legal process. When the resolution was defeated, he said that, "The voice of the delegates confirms the role of our committee in interpreting Jewish law."

Eventually, however, opposition from the religious "right wing" of the Conservative movement, unhappy with Siegel's position that ethics must eventually trump even prior Jewish law, would result in a replacement for Siegel as chairman of the CJLS.

=== Presidential inauguration controversy ===
Siegel was not afraid of controversy, whether it related to his position as chair of the CJLS or to his personal decisions, when he felt he was in the right. In 1973, for example, when he was invited to be one of four prominent theologians to offer prayers at the presidential inauguration of Richard Nixon, he created a stir by announcing that he would include the Talmudic blessing for a king in his prayer. Although the U.S. President is not a king, he is the head of State with tremendous power and responsibility, Siegel explained, and—as other Conservative leaders, including Wolfe Kelman, asserted, "throughout Jewish history, rabbis and other learned Jews have recited these blessings when they have called upon or received kings, governors, and other high civil officials," because "according to Jewish traditional practice and precedent," they "may be recited whenever one is in the presence of someone who holds chief executive office in a political sovereignty." Siegel did explain to his detractors that he would offer the blessing "in a special way." He would begin the prayer by addressing God with the traditional Hebrew words for, "Blessed Art Thou"; switch to English, for, "O Lord our God, King of the Universe"; and then conclude in Hebrew with the traditional words of the blessing, "who has given of Thy glory to flesh and blood."

However, as the New York Times reported, this "special way" was "not 'special enough' to forestall criticism for his choice of blessing, or for his participation in a ceremony carried by loudspeakers, radio, and television, on the Jewish Sabbath." To accommodate what was for some a religious prohibition of turning on anything electrical during the Jewish Sabbath, the White House had the microphones for the ceremony turned on the afternoon of the previous day—with a military guard in place to ensure they would not be accidentally switched off. To avoid riding on the Jewish Sabbath, Siegel stayed in a nearby hotel, with a military aide escorting him back and forth to the ceremony. Additionally, the White House provided him with kosher food both for his hotel room and at the luncheon following the ceremony, something they also did for the parents of Henry Kissinger, who were also religiously observant.

=== Religious Authority and Spokesperson ===
Despite the occasional controversy, within the Conservative movement or within the larger Jewish community, it was rare for an issue to be discussed in the press that included the views of religious leaders without including an interview with Siegel, who was known as someone who could explain complicated issues in an understandable way. For example, when the Jewish community was divided over decisions of the government of Menachem Begin regarding settlements in Israel, Siegel was quoted widely to explain the differing views of the Jewish community:

"There are three different groups in the Jewish community. The first group is in total agreement with the Begin Government and resents any criticism. Another group is the people who are just opposed to the present Government -- some are more dovish, some are more hawkish."
"It is the "middle group," as he terms it, that Rabbi Siegel feels represents the majority. "People think in some instances Begin is making a mistake, but are hesitant to criticize because open criticism might harm the interests of Israel," he said. "They could be swayed either way, depending upon how unwise a policy appears."
He added that however much these three groups differ in opinions on specifics, they are all firmly "under a tent of intense pro-Israel sentiment."

Similarly, he could explain religious positions to interfaith groups. For example, when he made the statement that "Israel is salvation, but not redemption," Christian theologians understood his position as one close to their view of "signs of the Kingdom," opening up possibilities of dialogue and understanding.

He was frequently quoted for Jewish views in the area of medical ethics, able to give clear answers, even in complicated areas. For example, in the debate on continuing or ceasing medical treatment for terminally ill patients who are suffering, he said,"It is the individual's duty to live as long as he can, but if a person is destined to die soon, there is no obligation to prevent that death from happening." Regarding in-vitro fertilization, at a time when many religious leaders were voicing concerns, he said, "When nature does not permit conception, it is desirable to try to outwit nature. The Talmud teaches that God desires man's cooperation." On the issue of "fetal experimentation" after late term abortion, some doctors believed that experiments should be allowed for "the greater good," arguing that the subjects of their experiments (called "infants" or "premature babies" by those who opposed the experiments, and "fetuses" by those in favor) would not survive in any case. Siegel disagreed, testifying in 1975 before National Commission for the Protection of Human Subjects, urging the Commission to recall the results when Nazi physicians ignored the sanctity of individual lives to serve what they saw as a greater good for mankind:

Experiments for the `good of medicine' or for the sake of the `progress of knowledge' are not automatically legitimated, if they cause harm to people now, because someone in the future might benefit. What comes in the future is what the Talmudic literature calls `the secrets of the Almighty. This does not mean that we have no responsibility toward the future. However, we have a greater responsibility to those who are now in our care.

The position that the life "before us now" must take precedence over possible "future good" was part of his view that a "bias toward life" must come first, because of the "indeterminacy of the future." However, the concept of "a bias for life" was one that also gave foundation to his writings on other subjects, including his explanation of the view that suicide is an act that we must regard with compassion, but ultimately, reject as forbidden: "Suicide is a final and dramatic statement of an approach to life which a people professing a faith in the goodness of God and the goodness of life cannot condone."

Siegel's concept of a bias for life "summarized his ethical realism and was incorporated into some final statements of House of Representatives reports. His approach to difficult questions based on idealism and faith tempered by realism and pragmatism made him such a frequent spokesperson for those who understood that faith could contribute to modern questions and debates:

[Siegel] maintained that Judaism, and the Western ethical tradition in general, should recognize human life as valuable and worthy of respect whether in utero, at the end of the aging process, or at the point of death. He was not opposed to abortion, human experimentation or euthanasia. He was opposed to the present tendency to carry out these actions indiscriminately as a matter of public policy without proper and prudent scrutiny by qualified ethical personnel.

== Theology ==
=== Transforming the World ===
Siegel, like Heschel, saw the Jewish concept of transforming the world, as partners of God in ongoing creation, as central to the Jewish vision of faith—a concept that today would be linked to the term, tikkun olam, "mending" the world. In part, it was this vision of humanity's challenge to change what we inherit that stood in tension with his belief in preserving or "conserving" the past. Bringing these ideas to the natural world around us meant maintaining a great respect for the world in which we live, but understanding that there is a difference between respect and "reverence," if reverence for the world somehow implied that it was sinful to change it. So, for instance, he wrote and spoke frequently of our responsibility to transform the world as we inherit it, so as to "improve the human estate":

According to Siegel, Jewish theology begins with the belief in God as the creator of the world. The fact that God created the world gives it meaning, purpose and value. The fact that it is created desanctifies the universe. The heavens declare the glory of God, but they are not God. In paganism, the gods inhabit nature; therefore, man's greatest goal is to conform to nature, not to transform it. The biblical God is above nature, and therefore man is to be a partner with God in the work of creation.

This belief in humanity's challenge to transform and "outwit' nature for the sake of progress in terms of "the human state" was a recurrent theme in Siegel's writing and thinking. In 1987, when the Catholic Church issued a strong condemnation of procedures such as artificial insemination and in vitro fertilisation, Siegel wrote that, "The Jewish idea about all this is directly opposite to that of the Pope.... Jews believe we have to use nature to outwit nature . . . use it in order to correct problems, to remove disabilities, to increase human happiness."

It was this belief of Siegel's that led him to take a stand as the only member of the President's Commission for the Study of Ethical Problems in Medicine and Biomedical Research who did not sign a petition to Congress—widely circulated and signed by leaders of a number of U.S. faith groups—asking that it ban genetic experiments by scientists "that might change human characteristics passed along from one generation to its successor.". Taking a stand against the petition, he restated his belief that, "The biblical writers see man's role not merely to conform to nature but to improve it, if possible." For that reason, "genetic research should be encouraged, not met with cries of alarm."

=== Defining Conservative Judaism ===
==== Tradition and Change ====
For many years, Siegel taught courses at JTS on the history and theology of the Conservative movement, stressing that the word "conservative" had to be understood in the way it was used in British politics: that the push should be to "conserve" the traditions and decisions of the past as much as possible, changing only when there was an overriding reason—usually an overriding ethical reason—to do so. He believed that in Judaism, as in conservative political theory, "when it is not necessary to change, it is necessary not to change." As a 1988 issue of Conservative Judaism, dedicated to Siegel as "theologian and teacher," put it, his philosophy of Judaism included the idea of: Change not for the sake of change, but for the sake of an ethical outcome. Siegel wrote that:

"The first aim of Conservative Judaism "is preservative, and seeks to validate and promote the observance of Jewish law. This first aim goes back to the founders of the movement. Zecharias Frankel, the founder of the Positive-Historical school, and Schechter, who proposed the idea of Catholic Israel, saw as their main goal the need to defend the halakhah [Jewish law] against the attacks of the reformers."

But, as noted above, Siegel believed that the push to preserve or conserve the laws we inherit cannot be undertaken as if we have not also inherited aggadah, the wealth of Jewish teachings that come to us in the form of writing focused on morals, ethics, values, and even dreams. This inheritance, no less valuable and no less "commanding" in his eyes than the legal teachings, must be considered in any religious struggle to understand how we are to act to make the world better, to "mend" or "repair" its flaws. And so, his view was that ethical principles must challenge our understanding of the law, and aggadah must challenge us to reconsider and even, sometimes, reevaluate, halakhah—but to do so carefully, and in a measured way.

The reason to reevaluate Jewish halakhic/legal positions on questions could result from a number of reasons, including new scientific findings that add to humanity's knowledge. So, for example, when there no longer seemed to be any doubt that smoking was a primary cause of lung cancer and other medical problems, Siegel believed that it could no longer be permitted in terms of Jewish law. Quoting the Bible verse, Deuteronomy 4:15, "Be very careful about your lives," he said that smoking "is contrary to a divine commandment to preserve the health of your body and spirit." In addition to speaking out as an individual, Siegel was a supporter of a Rabbinical Assembly resolution that condemned smoking as a "violation of Jewish law," urging individuals to stop, and supporting the idea of smoking bans in public places—the first major Jewish religious body to take such a position.

Within the framework of this philosophy—one that begins with an effort to conserve or preserve the past, and yet accepts not only the possibility but also the responsibility of change when it was ethically mandated—Siegel developed five fundamental principles of Conservative Judaism: (1) covenantal theology; (2) the "nature of man" (expressing our humanity through our decisions and our lives); (3) the process of history; (4) the Jewish people as a bearer of revelation; and (5) the principle of "social change"—that the best and most authentic change is gradual and organic, not revolutionary.

Although Siegel may have been attacked as being "too liberal" by some, and "too conservative" by others, he himself argued that he was taking a "centrist" position in terms of the "tradition and change" inherent in Jewish law, rejecting both the extreme that believed no change was possible, and the opposite extreme, that considered that change was almost a good in and of itself. In fact, he was sometimes described as being part of the group that included Louis Finkelstein, Heschel, and Max Kadushin," occupying "their traditional middle position of respect for the law but wide latitude for differing interpretations." In fact, Siegel often argued that the "bulk" of Conservative Jews were centrists, "accepting deliberate and reasoned change," even though critics of the movement often seem to speak in terms of "left" and "right."

==== An Understanding of God ====
Writing about the understanding of and encounter with God in Conservative Judaism, Siegel wrote that traditional Jews frequently speak to God, and even argue with God, but very rarely agree about God. All writers about God recognize, he wrote, "the experience of the Divine as Power," and that the human response to such an encounter or awareness is the fear and trembling that the Protestant theologian Rudolph Otto called the mysterium tremendum. However, Siegel contended that God must be more than power, and our response—our encounter with the Divine—must be more than fear or awe. In "God in the Teachings of Conservative Judaism," he collected writings of some of the leading teachers and thinkers of the Conservative movement, describing their understanding of God as primarily one of five overlapping and complementary visions: (1) the Helping God; (2) the Dialogic God; (3) the Feeling God; (4) the Saving God; and (5) the Hidden God. Ultimately, he wrote, our experience with God depends on our experience with life, and our identity as human beings:

In all of the five currents we have described, we start with man. We try to understand the type of being we are. We strive for perfection and God helps us. We find our true being in dialogue--with God the Eternal Thou, responding and calling to us. We sense the Ineffable--and God is the reality behind all reality, who is concerned with us and suffers with our failures, and rejoices in our achievements. We are threatened with meaninglessness--and God relates to us, saving us from the dead-ends of life. We find men capable of the most unspeakable deeds--and therefore we must address the Hidden God so that we can help Him bring about the redemption.
Thus the idea of God is related to the idea of man. And the scholars in Conservative Judaism have struggled to find the essence of God's meaning so that we can learn more about our duties as men and women, and above all, as Jews.

==== The Conservative Movement ====
Siegel remained a firm believer in Conservative Judaism, both in terms of its vision—that is, its philosophical and theological underpinnings—and in its strength as a movement, especially in terms of its rabbis. He accused critics of mistaking "discussion and debate" for a "split" within the movement, writing that leaders, including the members of the Committee on Jewish Laws and Standards, respected the views of their colleagues, "even when they disagree with them." "This kind of give-and-take," he wrote, is not a sign of a 'dilemma' or 'demoralization' -- but of vigor and life."

However, he spoke out regarding the need to strengthen the level of observance on the part of the laity:

If we are to abide by the principles informing the Conservative Movement, we must work harder to develop interest in, and commitment to, Jewish law in our communities. We cannot be effective interpreters of the law unless there is a partnership with the people trying to observe it. It is a difficult task that has been undertaken -- to renew and to retain, to conserve and to progress.

== Rabbis' Rabbi ==
Siegel was a scholar and an activist, and he was a frequent speaker and a prolific writer. He worked with numerous Jewish and Christian leaders of his day, including Will Herberg, William Sloane Coffin, Mordecai Kaplan, and Reinhold Niebuhr. However, in addition to his classes, books, articles, and his numerous religious and political pursuits, he was well known as a "rabbi's rabbi," available and accessible to his students and colleagues.

In a book dedicated to Siegel and to Moses Zucker by Rabbi Byron L. Sherwin, a former student, the dedication describes Siegel in a way that many of his past students might have done:

Over a period of 26 years, until his untimely death in February 1988, Rabbi Seymour Siegel taught, guided, nurtured, and encouraged my studies. It was he who introduced me to many of the texts and methodologies of study that have preoccupied most of my teaching and scholarship. He initiated me into the study of the complexities of Jewish theology, the problems of Jewish ethics, the labyrinth of Jewish mysticism, and the perplexities of Holocaust studies. In many ways he inspired and enabled me to research and write this book.

From his office at JTS or from his home, Siegel responded to questions on Jewish law, ethics, and sometimes just requests for personal advice, by phone or by mail, from rabbis throughout the world. Conservative movement theologian Neil Gillman speaks of Siegel as a "beloved teacher of theology and Talmud, who exerted a significant religious influence on generations of students." As his obituary put it, "For many rabbis, he was the final authority on religious law."

=== Memorials and Remembrances ===
Around the country, a number of institutions and organizations have created scholarships, lectures, and special programs in Siegel's memory. The UJA-Federation sponsors a Rabbi Seymour Siegel Scholarship to select graduate students interested specifically in the field of Jewish education or synagogue life. There is an annual JTS scholarship for a graduate student, and an annual memorial lecture at St. Lawrence University. The St. Lawrence University Seymour Siegel Archives houses his personal and professional papers, which the university purchased in 1988 from the Siegel estate.

At Duke University, the alma mater of his late brother, Allen Siegel, there is an annual lecture on legal and medical ethics, in addition to a fellowship in his name. There is also an annual Rabbi Seymour Siegel National Moot Court Competition—an intercollegiate event open to law students from all major law schools, that is coordinated and administered by Duke University Law School, and is focused on the area of medical-legal ethics.
