= Lee I. Levine =

American-born Israeli rabbi, archaeologist and historian

- לי לוין
- Born: February 1, 1939 (age 87); Bangor, Maine, United States
- Citizenship: US American, Israeli

Academic background
- Education: Jewish Theological Seminary of America, Columbia College (New York)
- Doctoral advisor: Gerson Cohen

Academic work
- Institutions: Yale University, Hebrew University
- Notable works: Judaism and Hellenism in Antiquity (1999); The Ancient Synagogue (2005)
- Website: http://jewishhistory.huji.ac.il/Profs/HU/Archaeology/levine.htm

Lee I. Levine (born 1 February 1939; Hebrew: לי לוין) is an American-born Israeli rabbi, archaeologist and historian of classical Judaism. He is a strong believer in the ability of the Jewish people and Judaism to adapt to local settings as a key to survival. He is the author of Judaism and Hellenism in Antiquity and The Ancient Synagogue, one of the most comprehensive texts on the subject.

Levine is a professor of Jewish history and archaeology at the Hebrew University of Jerusalem. He received degrees at the Jewish Theological Seminary of America (JTS), where he was ordained as a Conservative rabbi, and Columbia University. He was a student of Gerson Cohen.

In 1961, Levine married Mira Karp, whom he met at Camp Ramah. Levine has also taught at Yale University and the Seminary of Judaic Studies in Jerusalem. He has directed several archaeological digs, among them a dig in Caesarea and the excavation of the Hurvat Amudim Synagogue.

== Published work ==
- The Ancient Synagogue: The First Thousand Years, Second Edition, Yale University Press, 2005
- Jerusalem: Portrait of the City in the Second Temple Period (538 B.C.E.-70 C.E.), Jewish Publication Society of America, 2002
- Judaism and Hellenism in Antiquity: Conflict or Confluence?, Hendrickson Publishers, 1999
- Rabbinic Class of Roman Palestine in Late Antiquity, Jewish Theological Seminary of America, 1990
