= Michael Greenbaum =

Rabbi Michael B. Greenbaum was the Vice Chancellor and Chief operating officer of The Jewish Theological Seminary. He is also an assistant professor of Educational Administration, teaching courses in nonprofit management, leadership theory and practice, and the history of the Conservative Movement.

== The Jewish Theological Seminary ==
As JTS's chief operating officer, Rabbi Greenbaum was responsible for day-to-day operations. He also oversaw the physical development of JTS's campus and the professionalization of operations. Rabbi Greenbaum worked closely with Arnold Eisen on a wide range of JTS and Conservative Movement issues and activities, both here and abroad, and represents JTS on numerous boards and committees of the Conservative Movement. He currently serves as the secretary of the National Ramah Commission.

== Scholarship ==
Rabbi Greenbaum is a recognized expert on Louis Finkelstein, JTS chancellor (1940–1972), and the Conservative Movement. His work in these areas has appeared in Conservative Judaism; Tradition Renewed, the two-volume history of JTS; and the Journal of Conservative Judaism. His book Louis Finkelstein and the Conservative Movement: Conflict and Growth, was published in 2001 by Binghamton University and recently republished by The Jewish Theological Seminary. In addition to working under Dr. Finkelstein as a student, Rabbi Greenbaum has also had the privilege of working closely with previous chancellors Gerson D. Cohen and Ismar Schorsch.

== Higher Education Administration ==
Rabbi Greenbaum's expertise in higher education administration has been acknowledged by both the Association of Theological Schools (the primary accrediting body for religiously affiliated schools in North America) and the Middle States Association of Colleges and Schools, which accredits all postsecondary schools in the Middle Atlantic region, Puerto Rico, and other locations abroad. He served for four years as a member of the Association of Theological Schools' National Commission on Accrediting and six years as a commissioner of the Commission on Higher Education of the Middle States Association, during which time he was also a member of the executive committee. Over the years, Rabbi Greenbaum has chaired numerous evaluation teams for both organizations.

== Training ==
Born in New Jersey, Rabbi Greenbaum moved at a young age to Daytona Beach, Florida. He attended Yeshiva University in New York City and received a Bachelor of Science degree from the University of Miami in Coral Gables, Florida. Rabbi Greenbaum received a master of education degree from Columbia University, and a master of Hebrew literature degree from JTS, where he was ordained. Rabbi Greenbaum received his doctorate in Higher Education Administration from Columbia University.

== Personal life ==
For more than thirty years, Rabbi Greenbaum has been privileged to share the pulpit in Sharon, Massachusetts, on the High Holidays. He has also been a scholar-in-residence at various events. He was named one of the "50 Most Influential Rabbis in America" by Newsweek magazine in 2008 (#37) and 2009 (#24).

Rabbi Greenbaum and his wife, Cindy, have four children and four grandchildren. They reside in Hackensack, New Jersey, where they are members of Congregation Beth Sholom of Teaneck and Temple Beth-El of Hackensack.

== Works ==
=== Books ===
- "The Finkelstein Era," in Tradition Renewed: A History of The Jewish Theological Seminary. Jack Wertheimer, editor, Spring 1997.
- Louis Finkelstein and the Conservative Movement: Conflict and Growth, Binghamton University: Global Publications, 2001.
- "Ramah: A Paradigm for Conservative Jews," Ramah at 60: Impact and Innovation, JTS Press, Rabbi Mitchell Cohen and Dr. Jeffrey Kress, Eds., Spring, 2010

=== Articles ===
- "How Jewish Theological Seminary Eliminated a $3.5 Million Deficit," Management Issues, KPMG Newsletter, September 1993.
- "Finkelstein and His Critics," Conservative Judaism, Summer, 1995.
- "Letter from Morningside Heights – Strengthening the Conservative Movement," Conservative Judaism, Fall 2003.
