= Harold Louis Ginsberg =

Canadian-born biblical literature professor

Harold Louis Ginsberg (December 6, 1903 – 1990), famous as H. L. Ginsberg, was a professor of biblical literature at the Jewish Theological Seminary of America in New York City in the 20th century.

== Biography ==
Ginsberg was born in Montreal, Quebec, Canada. He received his Ph.D. from the University of London in 1930, became a professor at the Jewish Theological Seminary of America (JTS), and served as the Sabato Morais Professor of Biblical History and Literature since 1941.

The professor was an expert on ancient Canaanite myths. He contributed to Ancient Near Eastern Texts Relating to the Old Testament, a key sourcebook for ancient texts with a literary relationship with the Tanakh (Hebrew Bible, a.k.a. Old Testament.) During the 1930s and '40s, he was the leading scholar of the newly discovered north Canaanite language of Ugarit and a major scholar of Aramaic.

Ginsberg was also one of the key translators of the New Jewish Publication Society of America Version of the Hebrew Bible or Tanakh, the second translation published by the Jewish Publication Society of America (JPS), superseding its 1917 version. It is a fresh translation into modern English, independent of the earlier translation or any other existing one. Current editions of this version refer to it as The Jewish Publication Society Tanakh Translation. Originally known by the abbreviation “NJV” (New Jewish Version), it is now styled as “NJPS.” The translation follows the Hebrew or Masoretic Text scrupulously, taking a conservative approach regarding conjectural emendations. It avoids them almost completely for the Torah but mentions them occasionally in footnotes for Nevi'im and Ketuvim. Attested variants from other ancient versions are also mentioned in footnotes, even for the Torah, in places where the editors thought they might shed light on difficult passages in the Masoretic Text.

He also dedicated five years to helping to make the Hebrew Bible available in Braille. Additionally, he was an editor for the Encyclopedia Judaica.

Ginsberg has been described as "one of the greatest minds in the Jewish world" of his generation, along with other professors at JTS, such as Abraham Joshua Heschel, Mordecai Kaplan, and Louis Finkelstein.

== Member in professional organizations ==
Ginsberg was a member of a number of professional organizations, including:

- Society of Biblical Literature
- American Academy for Jewish Research
- American Friends of the Israel Exploration Society
- Academy of the Hebrew Language, honorary member

== Selected works ==
- "The North-Canaanite myth of Anath and Aqhat", Bulletin of the American Schools of Oriental Research 97 (February 1945:3-10).
- Five Megilloth and Jonah: A New Translation
- Studies in Koheleth
- The Five Megilloth and Jonah : a new translation
- The supernatural in the prophets : with special reference to Isaiah
- Studies in Daniel (Texts and studies of JTS; vol. 14)
- The Prophets (Nevi'im) A new trans. of the Holy Scriptures
- Many Bible articles in the Encyclopedia Judaica
