= North Suburban Synagogue Beth El =

Conservative Jewish synagogue in Highland Park, Illinois

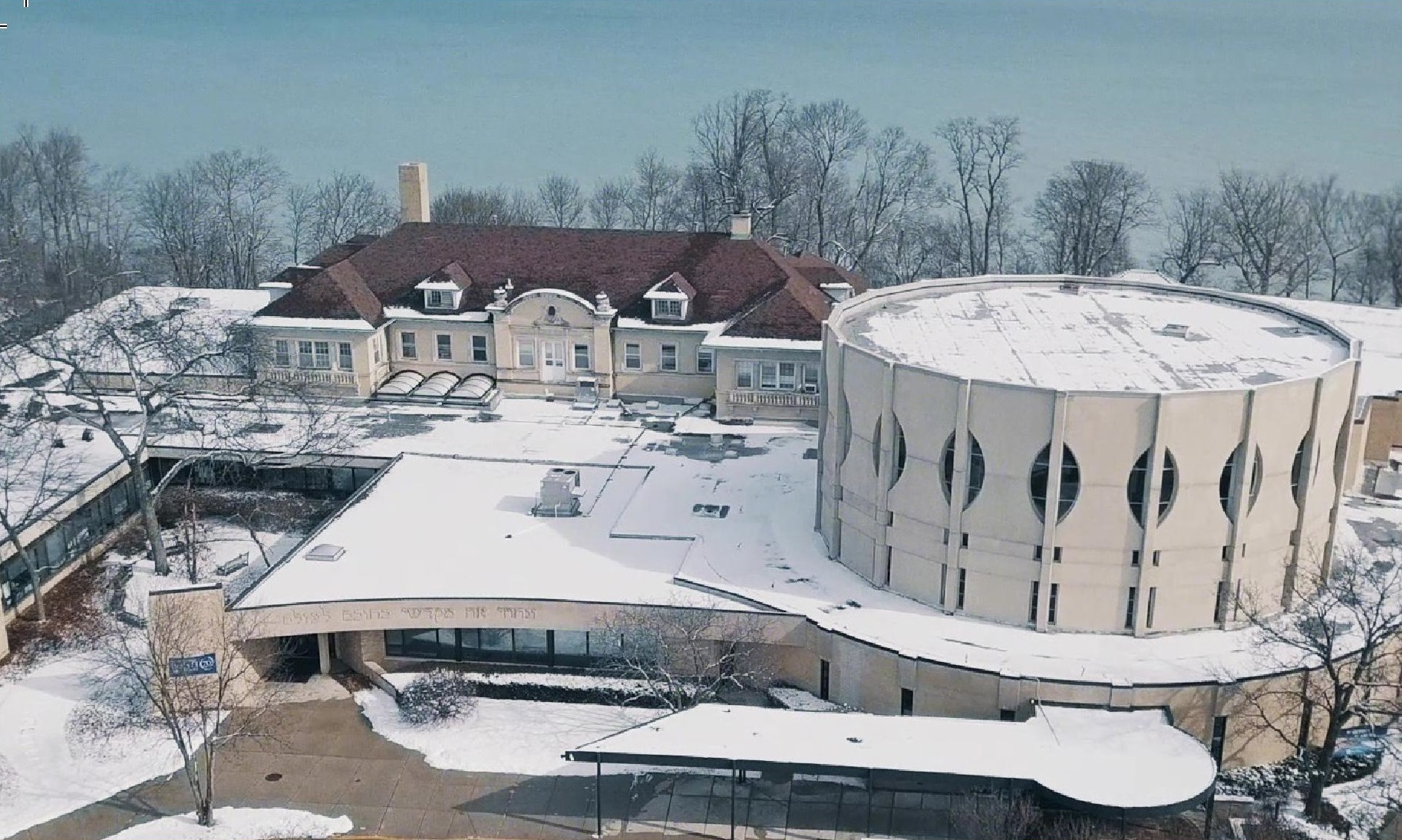
- An aerial photograph of the synagogue, in 2018

- Location in greater Chicago, Illinois

Religion
- Affiliation: Conservative Judaism
- Ecclesiastical or organizational status: Synagogue
- Leadership: Rabbi Michael Schwab; Rabbi Alex Freedman (Associate); Rabbi Vernon Kurtz (Emeritus)
- Status: Active
- Notable artworks: Interior metalwork and design by Ludwig Wolpert

Location
- Location: 1175 Sheridan Road, Highland Park, Lake County, Illinois
- Country: United States
- Interactive map of North Suburban Synagogue Beth El
- Coordinates: 42°10′27″N 87°46′37″W

Architecture
- Architect: Percival Goodman
- Type: Synagogue architecture
- Style: Modernist
- Established: 1946 (as a congregation)
- Completed: 1962
- Site area: 6.5 acres (2.6 ha)

Website
- nssbe.shulcloud.com

North Suburban Synagogue Beth El is a Conservative Jewish congregation and synagogue, located on a 6.5-acre (2.6 ha) campus overlooking Lake Michigan at 1175 Sheridan Road in Highland Park, a northern suburb of Chicago, Illinois, in the United States.

Beth El was founded in 1946 following a series of parlor meetings in Glencoe, Illinois, initiated by Benjamin and Gertrude Harris. The synagogue was incorporated as an Illinois not-for-profit corporation in July 1947 (Note: Although CauseIQ states it was founded in 1994.) with Arnold P. Natenberg as its first president.

== Building ==
Beth El acquired its permanent home in 1948, a lavish "showcase" private residential mansion constructed in 1911 by Edward Valentine Price, a wealthy wholesale men's clothing manufacturer and owner of Ed. V. Price and Co. in Chicago. The Price mansion was designed by architect Ernest Mayo.

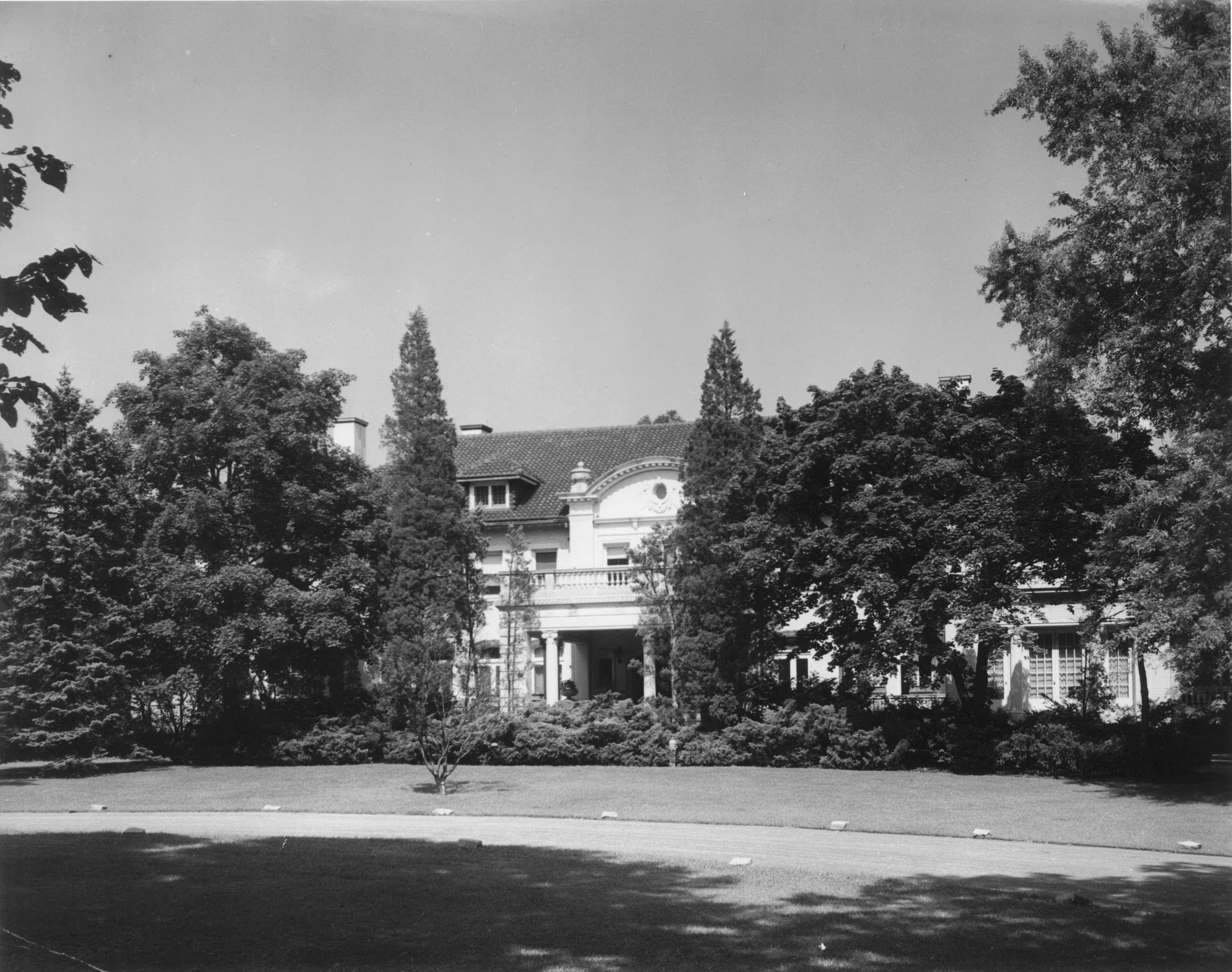
"Bonita Vista," the mansion built by Edward Valentine Price in Highland Park, Illinois in 1911.

The Price mansion today houses the synagogue's library, the Beit Midrash (small sanctuary), educational offices, and classrooms. In 1953 a school building designed by architect Isadore H. Braun was constructed adjacent to the Price mansion, and in 1956 a large auditorium with catering facilities and a youth lounge was added.

A sanctuary, designed by acclaimed architect Percival Goodman, commenced in 1962 and was dedicated in 1964. Referred to as "a jeweled crown" because of its circular shape and decoration, the fine and distinctive building, has been overshadowed by its near-contemporary neighbor, the North Shore Congregation Israel by Minoru Yamasaki. However, Beth El ranks among the best designed and best preserved synagogues of the 1960s. The sanctuary is essentially a round drum flanked by a low sweeping entryway, around which is wrapped a sprawling complex. The drum appears to be made of pre-fabricated joined concrete slabs. With unusual window shapes, Goodman has used color to highlight the sanctuary's features and the curved walls open into the social hall. In addition to its architecture, it houses an impressive ark, menorah and other metalwork by Ludwig Wolpert.

An administrative wing and an extension of the school building, both designed by architects Bernheim & Kahn, were added to the synagogue in 1989.

== Congregation ==
Beth El grew from twenty-five family members at the time of its founding to over 1000 families in 2022. It currently operates an award-winning pre-school, a large supplemental religious school and, in cooperation with other Conservative synagogues in the area, a Hebrew High School program. A robust continuing education program, a 20,000 volume library (accredited by the Association of Jewish Libraries), and a diverse museum collection that encompasses paintings, sculptures, prints, rare books and Judaic ritual objects from around the world, all contribute to create a strong Jewish educational experience for the community.

== Clergy ==
=== Rabbinical leaders ===
Beth El's first rabbi was Maurice I. Kliers, who served from 1948 to 1950, when he left to join South Side Hebrew Congregation in Chicago. Philip L. Lipis, a US Navy chaplain during World War II, joined Beth El in 1951. Rabbi Lipis oversaw the rapid growth in membership and the physical expansion of the synagogue's facilities. He was instrumental in strengthening the educational aspects of the congregation, particularly the youth and adult education programming. Rabbi Lipis retired in 1969 and moved to California, where he taught at the University of Judaism (now the American Jewish University).

Samuel H. Dresner became senior rabbi at Beth El in 1969. A leading scholar and author within the Conservative movement, he drew hundreds of congregants to Shabbat morning services to hear him preach. Dedicated to strengthening religious practice, Rabbi Dresner also took steps to enhance the role of women in religious services. In 1977 Dresner left the synagogue following a contentious internal struggle over his continuation as senior rabbi. That year he became the founding rabbi of Moriah Congregation in Deerfield, Illinois.

William H. Lebeau succeeded Rabbi Dresner in 1978. Rabbi Lebeau was a rising star in the Conservative movement who impressed the congregation with his warmth and vision for the development of the synagogue's educational programming and facilities. He left Beth El in 1987 to serve as Vice-Chancellor of the Jewish Theological Seminary in New York and dean of its rabbinical school.

Vernon H. Kurtz was installed as senior rabbi of Beth El in 1988 and served in that role until his retirement in 2018 when he moved to Israel. Rabbi Kurtz was a serious proponent of Conservative Judaism and of the State of Israel, serving in top leadership positions in numerous local, national and international Jewish organizations throughout his tenure at the congregation and establishing himself as a well-known and influential leader in the American Jewish community.

Michael Schwab began his rabbinic career at Beth El in 2004 as assistant rabbi of the congregation and was named Senior Rabbi in 2019. He has brought to Beth El a strong sense of community, a deep love for Israel, an unbridled enthusiasm for serving others, and an uplifting sense of joy in teaching and practicing Jewish traditions. Rabbi Schwab occupies the Vernon H. Kurtz Senior Rabbinic Chair. The current associate rabbi is Alex Freedman.

=== Cantors ===
Throughout its history, Beth El has striven to enhance its religious services with talented hazzanim (cantors). Among these were Cantor Jordan Cohen (1953–1969), Cantor Reuven Frankel (1970–1979), Hazzan Henry Rosenblum (1987–1998), Hazzan Larry B. Goller (1998–2015) and Hazzan Benjamin A. Tisser (2015–2021). The current cantor is Hazzan Jacob Sandler, a 2021 graduate of the H. L. Miller Cantorial School at the Jewish Theological Seminary.
