= Sylvia Ettenberg =

Sylvia Cutler Ettenberg (July 27, 1917 – June 21, 2012) was a Jewish educator at the forefront of many Conservative Jewish educational initiatives and was one of the founders of the Camp Ramah camping movement. A graduate of Brooklyn College and the Jewish Theological Seminary of America (JTS), she was invited by JTS Chancellor Louis Finkelstein to join the JTS administration in 1946. Ettenberg served as registrar and oversaw the development of the Teachers Institute and Seminary College of JTS. Along with Rabbi Moshe Davis, a dean at JTS, she was responsible for establishing the Ramah camping movement as a program of JTS. She was also instrumental in founding JTS's supplementary high school (Prozdor) program, its Melton Research Center, and, later, its William Davidson Graduate School of Jewish Education, and she played a key role in the development of List College's joint program with Columbia University. Sylvia Ettenberg died on June 21, 2012
