= Rabbinic cabinet =

A rabbinic cabinet or rabbinic council is a branch of a usually secular Jewish organization of some type. Rabbinic cabinets are reserved as advisory and outreach councils for rabbis and cantors who are members of such organizations. They are not to be confused with the associated rabbinical membership and policy bodies of religious and denominational organizations.

Rabbinic cabinets have also been assembled by leaders of Jewish seminaries and educational institutions, such as HUC-JIR's President's Rabbinic Council or JTS's Chancellor's Rabbinic Cabinet. These are usually assembled to help guide educational and administrative policy along a theological or ethical perspective.

== Organizations which possess rabbinic cabinets ==
- Jewish Voice for Peace
- Arzenu
- J Street
- Jewish Federations of North America
- State of Israel Bonds
- Friends of the Israel Defense Forces
