= Alan Mittleman =

Scholar of Jewish philosophy

Alan Mittleman (born 1953) is a professor of Jewish philosophy at the Jewish Theological Seminary of America.

== Education ==
Mittleman received his BA from Brandeis University and his MA and PhD from Temple University.

== Career ==
From 1984 to 1988, Mittleman served on the staff of the American Jewish Committee. He helped to draft a resolution by the United Church of Christ which made it the first Protestant denomination in the United States to declare that Christianity did not supersede Judaism.

Mittleman went on to serve as a professor of religion at Muhlenberg College from 1988 to 2004. He was the head of the Muhlenberg College Religion Department from 1997 to 2003.

From 2000 until 2004, he was also the director of a major research project on "Jews and the American Public Square" initiated by the Pew Charitable Trusts.

In 2004, Mittleman became Professor of Jewish Philosophy at the Jewish Theological Seminary of America (JTS). In 2007, he served as visiting professor of religion at Princeton University, and in that same year he became Chair of the Department of Jewish Thought at JTS.

Upon joining the Jewish Theological Seminary faculty, he also became director of the JTS's Louis Finkelstein Institute for Religious and Social Studies, a position he held until 2010.

In 2010, he became director of the Tikvah Institute for Jewish Thought at the Jewish Theological Seminary.

== Philosophical views ==
Mittleman has described himself as being a "rationalist" in his religious beliefs. He may be placed within the Jewish rationalist tradition of Jewish philosophy.

He thinks that "pure secularism may be incoherent" but that "robust religious hope needs the secularist critique."

== Personal ==
Professor Mittleman was married to the late Patti Mittleman, the retired Director of Muhlenberg College Hillel.

== Publications ==
Mittleman's books include:

- Between Kant and Kabbalah (SUNY Press, 1990)
- The Politics of Torah (SUNY Press, 1996)
- The Scepter Shall Not Depart From Judah (Lexington Books, 2000)
- Hope in a Democratic Age (Oxford University Press, 2009)
- A Short History of Jewish Ethics (Wiley-Blackwell, 2012)
- Human Nature & Jewish Thought: Judaism's Case for Why Persons Matter (Princeton University Press, 2015)
- Does Judaism Condone Violence?: Holiness and Ethics in the Jewish Tradition (Princeton University Press, 2018)

He is the editor of:

- Uneasy Allies: Evangelical and Jewish Relations (Lexington Books, 2007)
- Jewish Polity and American Civil Society (Rowman & Littlefield, 2002)
- Jews and the American Public Square (Rowman & Littlefield, 2002)
- Religion as a Public Good (Rowman & Littlefield, 2003)
- Holiness in Jewish Thought (Oxford University Press, 2018)

His writings have appeared in journals including Harvard Theological Review, Modern Judaism, the Jewish Political Studies Review, the Journal of Religion, and First Things.

== Awards ==
2018: National Jewish Book Award in the Modern Jewish Thought and Experiment for Does Judaism Condone Violence?: Holiness and Ethics
