= The Eternal Light =

The Eternal Light was an American radio and television program on the NBC Radio Network, produced in conjunction with the Jewish Theological Seminary, that was broadcast between 1944 and 1989. Featuring interviews, commentary, and award-winning dramas from the perspective of Judaism, it began on radio in 1944 and continued as a weekly radio program through 1989. A 1946 program, for example, dramatized humanitarian Lillian Wald's founding of New York City's Henry Street Settlement in 1895. The May 31, 1959, program featured a tour of the Holy Land narrated by Ralph Bellamy.

Beginning in 1952, The Eternal Light was also televised by NBC as part of its Sunday morning religious programming, along with Frontiers of Faith (produced in conjunction with the National Council of Churches) and The Catholic Hour. By the mid-1950s, the program had an audience of more than six million weekly on radio and television.

Milton E. Krents (1912–2000) was executive producer of The Eternal Light radio program for 44 years. NBC television's director for The Eternal Light, along with its other Sunday morning televised religious programs, was Martin Hoade (1916–2006). The program's editor was Moshe Davis of the Jewish Theological Seminary, who explained its purpose to a New York Times interviewer: "The common man is always the hero in our show. We try to put a contemporary subject in a concept of eternity." NBC donated the air time, and the Jewish Theological Seminary budgeted the show's production expenses. Spurning potential sponsorship offers, Davis told one persistent business executive, "My good man, God needs no sponsor".

Among the notables appearing on the series were Alan Arkin, Joseph Cotten, Joan Crawford, Mel Ferrer, Sam Levene, E. G. Marshall, Raymond Massey, Alexander Scourby, Maureen Stapleton, Elie Wiesel, and Gene Wilder.

The program won numerous awards, including two Emmy Awards, many Emmy nominations, and Peabody Awards in 1962, 1967, and 1973. Krents received a Lifetime Achievement Award from the National Academy of Television Arts & Sciences for his production of The Eternal Light. In 2007, a documentary about the series done by Diva Communications, The Eternal Light—A Historical Retrospective, won a New York Emmy Award.
