= Vernon Kurtz =

American rabbi

Vernon Kurtz is a prominent Conservative rabbi who has led North Suburban Synagogue Beth El for 30 years. He was also the president of the American Zionist Movement until 2017.
