= William H. Lebeau =

American rabbi

William Harry Lebeau (born 1938) is an American rabbi, former Dean of The Rabbinical School, Vice Chancellor and Chairman of the Department of Professional Skills, and Lecturer of Professional Skills at the Jewish Theological Seminary of America of Conservative Judaism in New York City.

== Early life ==
Rabbi Lebeau was born in Ohio in 1938. He was raised in Akron and graduated from Buchtel High School in 1955.

Rabbi Lebeau was ordained at JTS in 1964, having earned his bachelor's degree from New York University in 1959 and a master's degree from JTS in Jewish studies in 1962. Rabbi Lebeau and his wife, Beverly, have five children and fourteen grandchildren.

== Career ==
Lebeau stepped down at the Jewish Theological Seminary of America (JTS) on July 1, 2007. He was succeeded by Rabbi Daniel S. Nevins. During his tenure as Dean, Rabbi Lebeau expanded enrollment in The Rabbinical School.

Lebeau started his career at JTS in 1988 as Vice Chancellor for Rabbinic Development, and served two stints as dean of The Rabbinical School, from 1993-1999 and since June 2002. He has been an advocate for students studying in Israel as part of their rabbinic training. Rabbi Lebeau has also written on the subject of rabbinic training, including On Becoming a Conservative Rabbi.

As a congregational rabbi, he served three communities over a period of 24 years, beginning with two years as a chaplain in the United States Navy and Marine Corps. His first pulpit position was in Port Jefferson Station, New York, where he grew the congregation from 50 to 750 members during his 13-year tenure. He later served for ten years as the rabbi of North Suburban Synagogue Beth El in Highland Park, Illinois before joining the JTS faculty.
