= Lia Bass =

Latin American female rabbi

Personal life
- Born: Rio de Janeiro, Brazil
- Education: Jewish Theological Seminary of America

Religious life
- Religion: Judaism
- Denomination: Conservative Judaism

Lia Bass is a Brazilian-born American rabbi and the first Latin American female rabbi in the world. She is also Northern Virginia's first female Conservative rabbi and the first woman from Brazil to be ordained as a rabbi.

== Early life and education ==
She was born in Rio de Janeiro. Bass attended a Jewish day school in Rio and was a regular participant in sports run by her local Jewish Community Center and Zionist youth movements. After finishing high school, she went to teach Hebrew as a second language in Israel before returning to Brazil to attend college, where she served as president of the Jewish University Council. She was ordained by the Jewish Theological Seminary in New York in 1994.

Bass speaks Portuguese, Spanish, English and Hebrew. As part of her studies of the Torah, her main focus is on the Book of Leviticus.

== Career ==
In 2001, she became the rabbi of Congregation Etz Hayim in Arlington, Virginia, serving until 2020. She served as rabbi of Etz Hayim Synagogue in Arlington and gained media attention in 2007 for introducing a "slimmed down" shabbat service in order to make it more accessible for the congregation. In 2020 she founded and, as of Sept. 2022, runs the Jewish Institute for Lifelong Learning & Innovation (JILLI), based in Arlington, Virginia. She founded the JILLI after discovering from the Department of Motor Vehicles that Northern Virginia had the highest number of Jewish residents that were not associated with a recognised synagogue. She created it as an outreach mission to serve their religious needs.
