= Henry Rosenblum =

Henry Rosenblum was the hazzan (cantor) of the Forest Hills Jewish Center in Queens, NY from 2010 until 2021. From 1998 until 2010, he served as the Dean of the H.L. Miller Cantorial School of the Jewish Theological Seminary of America (JTS). He was the first hazzan to hold the position of Dean of the Cantorial School. As head of the cantorial school, he has been described as serving as a "much beloved mentor" to a generation of hazzanim. He has been credited with transforming the JTS cantorial school so that it was able to attract high-quality students and compete effectively with the School of Sacred Music at Hebrew Union College.

Prior to becoming dean of the cantorial school, Rosenblum served as a cantor at

- White Meadow Temple in Rockaway, New Jersey
- Oheb Shalom Congregation in South Orange, New Jersey
- North Suburban Synagogue Beth El in Highland Park, Illinois

He served as President of the Cantors Assembly from 1997 to 1999.

Rosenblum holds a B.A. in Philosophy from Brooklyn College and cantorial investiture and a bachelor's in sacred music from JTS. In 2002, he received a Doctor of Music degree honoris causa from JTS.
