= David C. Kraemer =

American rabbi

David Charles Kraemer is a professor of Talmud and Rabbinics and the Joseph J. and Dora Abbell Librarian at the Jewish Theological Seminary of America. As director of the Library, Kraemer "oversees the most extensive collection of Judaica—rare and contemporary—in the Western hemisphere".

Kraemer's books include:

- The Mind of the Talmud: An Intellectual History of the Babylonian Talmud (Oxford, 1990)
- Responses to Suffering in Classical Rabbinic Literature (Oxford, 1995)
- Reading the Rabbis: The Talmud as Literature (Oxford, 1996)
- The Meanings of Death in Rabbinic Judaism (Routledge, 2000)
- Exploring Judaism: The Collected Essays of David Kraemer (Scholars Press, 2000)
- Jewish Eating and Identity Through the Ages (Routledge, 2007)
- Rabbinic Judaism: Space and Place (Routledge, 2016)
- A History of the Talmud (Cambridge, 2019)
- Embracing Exile: The Case for Jewish Diaspora (Oxford, 2025)

He is editor of The Jewish Family: Metaphor and Memory (Oxford, 1989) and author of The Haggadah for iPad, published by Melcher Media.

Kraemer is regularly quoted in the US national, local and Jewish press as an authority on questions related to Jewish practice and the study of Talmud.

An authority on the laws of kashrut, he has written about the increased stringencies associated with the observance of kashrut. Kraemer has pointed out that many who observe kashrut today would not be willing to tolerate the ritual standards of renowned rabbinic authorities such as Akiva, Rashi or Joseph Caro.
