= Mychal Springer =

Mychal Springer is a rabbi and the manager of Clinical Pastoral Education at New York-Presbyterian Hospital.

== Education ==
Springer earned her BA at Yale University in 1987, and she received her master's degree and rabbinic ordination at the Jewish Theological Seminary of America in 1992.

== Career ==
Springer served as associate director of the Jewish Institute for Pastoral Care at the HealthCare Chaplaincy in Manhattan. She became certified as a chaplain and as a supervisor in the Association for Clinical Pastoral Education.

Springer then was appointed Associate Dean and Director of Field Education of the JTS Rabbinical School for seven years.

In 2009, with funding from the Charles H. Revson Foundation and the Booth Ferris Foundation, Springer established The Center for Pastoral Education with the goal of teaching the art of pastoral care to seminary students and ordained clergy of all faiths. Springer became the center's first director. She was also named the Helen Fried Kirshblum Goldstein Chair in Professional and Pastoral Skills.

== Awards ==
In 2010, Springer was awarded the Women of Valor Award from Jewish Funds for Justice, an award which "celebrates the achievements of outstanding Jewish women" in the area of social justice.

In 1998, Springer appeared in documentary, A Life Apart: Hasidism in America, which was directed and produced by Oren Rudavsky and Menachem Daum.
