= Shuly Rubin Schwartz =

Scholar of Jewish history

Shuly Rubin Schwartz is the Chancellor and Irving Lehrman Research Professor of American Jewish History and Sala and Walter Schlesinger Dean of the Gershon Kekst Graduate School at The Jewish Theological Seminary of America (JTS). Schwartz is the first woman elected as chancellor in the history of the seminary.

== Education ==
Schwartz is a graduate of Barnard College and the Jewish Theological Seminary of America. She wrote her Ph.D. dissertation at JTS under the direction of former JTS chancellor Ismar Schorsch.

== Career and publications ==
She has served in many leadership positions at JTS including dean of the undergraduate program, List College (1993-2018) and dean of the Graduate School (2010-2020). She is the first female chancellor appointed to serve at JTS and was also the first woman who served as provost.

In June 2025, Schwartz announced that she would step down at the end of the next academic year.In April 2026, it was announced that Schwartz would be succeeded as Chancellor by Rabbi Mike Uram.

Her first published book was The Emergence of Jewish Scholarship in America: The Publication of the "Jewish Encyclopedia". Her second book, The Rabbi's Wife: The Rebbetzin in American Jewish Life, was awarded a 2006 National Jewish Book Award. She has published other articles and editorials in anthologies and publications.
