= Yochanan Muffs =

Yochanan Muffs (June 3, 1932 - December 6, 2009) was an American professor of the Bible and religion at the Jewish Theological Seminary in New York City.

== Biography ==
Muffs grew up in a Conservative Jewish home in Flushing, Queens. His parents were Barney and Mary Muffs. Muffs had one sister, Civia, an artist. He did his undergraduate degree in Humanities at Queens College and studied for the rabbinate at the Jewish Theological Seminary, where he began teaching in 1954. He pursued his Ph.D. in Near Eastern studies at the University of Pennsylvania.

Muffs married Yocheved Herschlag in 1970. He succumbed to Parkinson's disease, from which he suffered for many decades.

== Academic career ==
Muffs made major contributions in biblical studies, Semitic languages, the history of the ancient Near East, and Jewish religion and thought. He strove to reach an understanding of biblical text through comparative philological study. His first book, Studies in the Aramaic Legal Papyri from Elephantine, published in 1969, has been described as a "watershed work." Muffs analyzed legal documents from a colony of Jewish families in fifth century BCE, using comparative evidence from Mesopotamian, Egyptian, Jewish and other legal sources to further understanding of life in those days. David Hartman, founder of the Shalom Hartman Institute in Jerusalem, described Muffs as a "master of midrashic analysis whose rich theological imagination reveals the gripping realism of the biblical God and the intensity of God's relationship to human history." In Love and Joy: Law, Language and Religion in Ancient Israel, Muffs writes about the core task of the prophet in the Israelite tradition: The Israelite prophet is given explicit directions from God, but is also "an independent advocate...attempting to mitigate the severity of the decree." In his review of The Personhood of God, Bishop Krister Stendahl of Harvard Divinity School says the book "embraces unashamedly the ways the Bible pictures God as a person with all the traits of human psychology and even anatomy...and shows convincingly how it enriches both faith and theology, not least by liberating the readers from the stultifying literal readings of the sacred texts."

Muffs was a fellow of the American Academy of Jewish Research.

== Ideas ==
In his essay "Who Will Stand in the Breach?" Muffs explores the role of the biblical prophet, whom he describes as a scolder but also a defender of the people. In the Old Testament, when God wants to destroy Israel for creating the golden calf, Moses confronts God. When Samuel is ordered to divest Saul of his kingship, he appeals to God all night. According to Muffs, intimacy with God means standing up to God.

In the Personhood of God, Muffs studies the anthropomorphic evolution of God, from creator of the cosmos to God the father, God the husband, God the king, God the "chess-player," and God the ultimate master. The book further examines how expressions of divine power, divine will and divine love in the Bible have impacted on the contemporary human condition.

== Published works ==
- Studies in the Aramaic Legal Papyri from Elephantine
- Love and Joy: Law, Language, and Religion in Ancient Israel
- The Personhood of God: Biblical Theology, Human Faith And the Divine Image ISBN 978-1-58023-338-5

== See also ==
- Elephantine papyri
