= List College =

Undergraduate school of the Jewish Theological Seminary of America (JTS)

Coordinates: 40.811859°N 73.960723°W

Albert A. List College of Jewish Studies
- Type: Private
- Established: 1909
- Dean: Amy Kalmanofsky
- Undergraduates: 195
- Location: New York City, New York, United States
- Campus: Urban
- Mascot: Heffy the Red Heifer
- Website: www.jtsa.edu/school/list-college/

The Albert A. List College of Jewish Studies, known simply as List College, is the undergraduate school of the Jewish Theological Seminary of America (JTS). It was founded by Solomon Schechter in 1909 as the Teachers Institute with the original goal of training American Jewish educators. List College is closely affiliated with Columbia University; with all List College students enrolled in dual-degree programs at either Columbia University or Barnard College.

== History ==
As chancellor of JTS, Solomon Schechter established the Teachers Institute as the undergraduate division of the seminary in 1909. The primary goal of the Teachers Institute was to train young Jewish educators. A co-educational school from its inception, the Teachers Institute was one of the few places in the country where women could study Judaics on a collegiate level. Mordecai Kaplan served as the school's first dean; his leadership and vision led to early successes. In 1931 a second undergraduate division, the Seminary College of Jewish Studies, was established for the education of Jewish lay-leaders.

In 1953, the scope of List College was greatly broadened by the establishment of a joint program with Columbia University, enabling students to simultaneously earn two bachelor's degrees—one from each school. A similar program for women only was created in conjunction with Barnard College in 1979. The Seminary College of Jewish Studies-Teachers Institute was renamed the Albert A. List College of Jewish Studies in 1986 in honor of a philanthropic donation to JTS. Students who attend List College today represent a wide spectrum of religious backgrounds, with many reasons for attending the program. While the original intention of the Teachers Institute was to train young Jewish educators, List College students pursue a variety of career paths upon completion of the program.

== Academics ==
List College grants a degree of Bachelor of Arts in twelve formal Judaic Studies majors ranging from Bible to Jewish Women's Studies. Students may also design their own interdisciplinary majors with institutional approval. All students concurrently pursue a second B.A. from either Columbia University or Barnard College—dual-degree programs entitled the Joint Program and the Double Degree Program respectively.

The college is need-blind for domestic applicants.

== See also ==
- Columbia University
- Barnard College
