= Judith Hauptman =

American feminist Talmudic scholar (born 1943)

Judith Rebecca Hauptman (born 1943) is an American feminist Talmudic scholar.

== Biography ==
She grew up in the Brooklyn borough of New York City, New York, United States.

Hauptman received a degree in Talmud from the Seminary College of Jewish Studies at Jewish Theological Seminary, a B.A. in economics from Barnard College, and an M.A. and Ph.D. in Talmudic studies from the Jewish Theological Seminary. She earned her PhD in 1982, and was the first woman to earn a PhD in Talmud, which she earned from the Jewish Theological Seminary in New York. She also studied at Hebrew University in Jerusalem.

Hauptman was ordained as a rabbi in May 2003 by the Academy for Jewish Religion. She is the E. Billi Ivry Professor of Talmud and Rabbinics at the Jewish Theological Seminary and the Chair of the Department of Talmud and Rabbinics. She has taught at the Jewish Theological Seminary since 1973. (Previously she taught at the Seminary's Prozdor high school division.) Shortly after her ordination as a rabbi, she founded Ohel Ayalah, an outreach project to disaffected young Jews, named in memory of her mother. Ohel Ayalah runs free, walk-in High Holy Days services and Passover seders for people of all ages on the first night and for twenties and thirties on the second.

Hauptman has analyzed the Talmudic sugya (i.e., literary units of discussion) and written on Talmudic law and women's issues in Judaism. Her view is that the ancient rabbis gradually granted women more autonomy and enacted laws that dealt with women in a fairer manner. She was an early member of Ezrat Nashim, a group of women who lobbied in the 1970s for egalitarianism in Jewish life. In 1993, she wrote the article “Women and Prayer: An Attempt to Dispel Some Fallacies,” (JUDAISM, Winter 1993). In it, she argued that Jewish women have always had an obligation to pray and for that reason can count in the minyan and even lead it in prayer.

In 2014, she became the first guest lecturer from abroad to address the Israeli Knesset’s weekly religious study session.

On June 20, 2026, she had a bat mitzvah at the age of 83.

== See also ==
- Timeline of women rabbis
