= Naomi Levy =

American rabbi, author and speaker

Rabbi Naomi Levy

Personal life
- Born: Naomi Levy Brooklyn, New York
- Spouse: Robert Eshman

Religious life
- Religion: Judaism

Jewish leader
- Residence: Los Angeles

Naomi Levy is an American rabbi, author and speaker.

== Biography ==
Levy was born and raised in the Boro Park section of Brooklyn, New York. She attended Bialik School and Yeshiva of Flatbush.

She attended Cornell University, where she graduated Phi Beta Kappa and summa cum laude. In 1984, she was in the first class of women to enter The Jewish Theological Seminary's rabbinical school. At the seminary, Rabbi Levy received honors as outstanding underclass student of Talmud and outstanding underclass rabbinical student. In 1989, Rabbi Levy became the first female Conservative rabbi to head a pulpit on the West Coast, at Mishkon Tephilo. She led Congregation Mishkon Tephilo in Venice, California for seven years.

Levy's first book, To Begin Again (1998), discusses recovery from suffering and tragedy, and relates her own loss when her father was murdered in an armed robbery when she was 15. Her 2002 book, Talking to God, discusses the transformative effect of prayer.

In 2004, Rabbi Levy founded Nashuva, a spiritual outreach service for Jews turned off to traditional Jewish service. Nashuva holds Shabbat services the first Friday of each month at a church in Brentwood, drawing capacity crowds of 300 people. Nashuva, which means "we will return" in Hebrew, also leads monthly social service and social action projects in the Los Angeles area. "The goal of prayer isn’t only personal peace," says the group's web site. "At Nashuva we believe that prayer leads us to action. It reminds us that we are here to heal this broken world. Nashuva is a service that leads to service."

Levy has appeared on NBC's Today Show and on Oprah, and has been featured in Parade, Redbook, SELF, and Los Angeles magazines. She serves on the faculties of the Wexner Heritage Foundation and the Academy of Jewish Religion. She lectures widely on topics of faith, strength, renewal, spirituality, healing and prayer.

Levy has made multiple appearances on Newsweek magazine's list of the 50 most influential rabbis in the nation and on the Forward 50 list of influential Jewish Americans.

In 2010, she published her third book, Hope Will Find You: My Search for the Wisdom to Stop Waiting and Start Living, which deals with what happened after her then 6-year-old daughter was diagnosed with a serious disease.

The 2022 art exhibit “Holy Sparks”, shown among other places at the Dr. Bernard Heller Museum, featured art about twenty-four female rabbis who were firsts in some way; Judy Sirota Rosenthal created the artwork about Levy that was in that exhibit.

Rabbi Levy lives in Venice, California, with her husband, Robert Eshman, formerly the editor-in-chief of the Jewish Journal of Greater Los Angeles, and their two children.

== Books ==
- To Begin Again: The Journey Toward Comfort, Strength, and Faith in Difficult Times (1998)
- Talking to God: Personal Prayers for Times of Joy, Sadness, Struggle, and Celebration (2002)
- Hope Will Find You: My Search for the Wisdom to Stop Waiting and Start Living (2010)
- Einstein and the Rabbi: Searching for the Soul (2017)
