= Neil Gillman =

Canadian-American rabbi and philosopher (1933–2017)

Neil Gillman (September 11, 1933 – November 24, 2017) was a Canadian-American rabbi and philosopher affiliated with Conservative Judaism.

== Early life and education ==
Neil Gillman was born on September 11, 1933, in Quebec City, Canada, then home to a small Jewish community. Raised in a household without access to a yeshiva or kosher butcher, he was strongly influenced by his grandmother's dedication to Jewish traditions. He studied philosophy and French literature at McGill University, where a lecture by sociologist Will Herberg sparked his interest in Jewish philosophy. Advised to deepen his grounding in Jewish texts, he enrolled at the Jewish Theological Seminary of America, studying under Rabbis Mordecai Kaplan and Abraham Joshua Heschel. Ordained in 1960, he began teaching at the seminary while earning a doctorate in philosophy from Columbia University in 1975.

== In Conservative Judaism ==
Gilman was a member of the Conservative movement's rabbinical body, the Rabbinical Assembly. He was a professor of Jewish philosophy at the Jewish Theological Seminary of America in Manhattan for 46 years and served as dean of its rabbinical school for a decade. Beginning in the 1980s, he published widely during a period of identity crisis within Conservative Judaism, which he once described as "an Orthodox faculty teaching Conservative rabbis to minister to Reform Jews." His theological work helped shape the movement's evolving approach to Jewish belief and law (Halakha).

Gillman's central concept of a "second naïveté" encouraged adult Jews to rediscover childlike awe in God. Drawing on biblical narratives as theological "myths," he emphasized existential engagement over literalism, portraying God as relational, emotional, and open to human influence.

An advocate for inclusivity, Gillman supported the training and ordination of women rabbis and Torah scholars, approved by JTS leadership in 1983, as well as the ordination of openly queer clergy—authorized by the Committee on Jewish Law and Standards (CJLS) in 2006—and equal access to Jewish marriage rites for same-sex couples, which the CJLS authorized in 2012.

Gillman served on the Commission on the Philosophy of Conservative Judaism, which produced Emet Ve'Emunah (Truth and Faith) in 1988, the first official statement of principles in the Conservative movement's 143-year history.

=== Writing ===
Gillman's 1990 book Sacred Fragments: Recovering Theology for the Modern Jew won the National Jewish Book Award.

In his 1997 book The Death of Death: Resurrection and Immortality in Jewish Thought, Gillman traced the development of Jewish beliefs about death and the afterlife. Emphasizing liturgical references, such as the daily praise of God for reviving the dead and the defeat of the Angel of Death in the Passover song "Chad Gadya," he argued that Jews should seriously engage with the idea of resurrection, including bodily resurrection.

In his 2004 book The Way Into: Encountering God in Judaism, Gillman explored the concept of a personal God in Jewish thought. He emphasized that the personal God is defined by dynamic, relational engagement with people, as reflected in biblical metaphors such as shepherd, parent, teacher, lover, sovereign, judge, and spouse, each conveying God's deep involvement in human relationships.

Gillman wrote a regular "Sabbath Week" column for The Jewish Week and served on the advisory committee of Sh'ma, a prominent newsletter focused on emerging trends in Jewish thought and practice.

== Personal life ==
Gillman was married to Sarah Fisher and had two daughters, Abigail and Deborah, as well as five grandchildren.

== Death ==
Gillman died on November 11, 2017, at his home in Manhattan. He had been treated for cancer.

== Books ==
- Believing and Its Tensions: A Personal Conversation about God, Torah, Suffering and Death in Jewish Thought, Jewish Lights, 2013.
- Doing Jewish Theology: God, Torah and Israel in Modern Judaism, Jewish Lights, 2008.
- Traces of God: Seeing God in Torah, History and Everyday Life, Jewish Lights, 2006.
- The Jewish Approach to God: A Brief Introduction for Christians, Jewish Lights, 2003.
- The Way into Encountering God in Judaism, Jewish Lights, 2000.
- The Death of Death: Resurrection and Immortality in Jewish Thought, Jewish Lights, 1997 (see book abstract).
- Conservative Judaism: The New Century, Behrman House, 1993.
- Sacred Fragments: Recovering Theology for the Modern Jew, Jewish Publication Society, 1992.
- Gabriel Marcel on Religious Knowledge, Rowman & Littlefield Publishers, 1980.

== Festschrift ==
- Plevan, William (ed.), Personal theology : essays in honor of Neil Gillman. Boston : Academic Studies Press, 2013.

== Awards ==
- 1991: National Jewish Book Award in the Jewish Thought category for Sacred Fragments: Recovering Theology for the Modern Jew

== See also ==
- American philosophy
- List of American philosophers
