= Max Kadushin =

Russian-American rabbi (1895–1980)

Max Kadushin (Belarusian: Макс Кадушын; December 6, 1895 – July 23, 1980) was a Conservative rabbi best known for his organic philosophy of rabbinics.

== Biography ==
Born in Minsk, Max Kadushin grew up in Seattle; his father operated a store for gold miners going to the Klondike. Kadushin came to New York in 1912. After graduating from New York University and getting a B.A. in 1912, Kadushin studied for the rabbinate at the Jewish Theological Seminary of America and was ordained in 1920. There he encountered Mordecai Kaplan and soon became a key figure in Kaplan's Reconstructionist Judaism movement. As his studies in aggadah continued during the late 1920s, however, he found himself drifting away from Kaplan's decidedly modernist approach to rabbinics and began to argue for a more aftermodernist approach—one that placed greater weight on the enduring significance of the aggadah.

In 1921, Kadushin became the rabbi of Congregation B'nai Israel of Washington Heights in New York City. In 1923 he married Evelyn Garfiel, a psychologist and professor, who later became well known for her book on Jewish prayer, The Service of the Heart (1958). Their son, Charles Kadushin, became a notable sociologist and social network analyst at Columbia University and later, the Graduate Center of the City University of New York. Their older son, (Solomon) Phineas Kadushin, also became a Rabbi, and later went to Yeshiva University for his graduate work in Psychology. He practiced as a psychoanalyst in New York City until he retired.

In 1926, Kadushin moved to Chicago, where he became the rabbi of Humboldt Boulevard Temple. In 1931, Kadushin moved to Madison, Wisconsin, where he served as the rabbi of the University of Wisconsin Hillel. In 1932, he received a Doctor of Hebrew Letters degree from the Jewish Theological Seminary.

From 1942 to 1952 he was director of the Hebrew High School of Greater New York, later known as the Marshaliah Hebrew High School. During the next several years he served two congregations in the New York area, the Bay Shore Jewish Center of Long Island, 1953–1954, and Synagogue Adath Israel of Riverdale, Bronx, New York, 1954–1958. From 1958 to 1960 Kadushin was professor of midrash and homiletics at the Academy for Higher Jewish Learning in New York City.

In 1960 Kadushin was invited to become visiting professor in ethics and rabbinic thought at The Jewish Theological Seminary. He held this position from 1960 to 1980, the year of his death.

Kadushin is now regarded as an important figure in the history of twentieth-century Conservative Judaism. In 1990, the book, Teaching for Christian Hearts, Souls & Minds, written by the Rev. Locke E. Bowman Jr., after conversations with one of Kadushin's students, Rabbi Arnold Resnicoff, was an attempt to apply Kadushin's theories of value concepts and organic Judaism to Christian teaching.

== Works ==
=== "The Theology of Seder Eliahu" (1932) ===
This work, a commentary on Seder Eliahu, was derived from Kadushin's Ph.D. dissertation. In it, he argues that ancient rabbinic texts possess organic, experiential consistency despite the sometimes non-linear character they possess.

=== "Organic Thinking" (1938) ===
Generally regarded as Kadushin's most important work, this volume establishes the fundamentals of Kadushin's philosophy—value-concepts, indeterminacy of belief, and normal mysticism—in a relatively straightforward manner. Although much of the work consists of textual analysis, the influence of Alfred North Whitehead is more apparent in this volume than in any of Kadushin's other works.

=== "The Rabbinic Mind" (1952) ===
This volume, which focuses almost entirely on Talmudic hermeneutics, builds on both of his previous works.

=== "Worship and Ethics" (1964) ===
This volume focuses primarily on rabbinic moral theology and Jewish mysticism. It is notable, among other reasons, for Kadushin's relative denunciation of Kabbalah as a tradition with which traditional rabbinic philosophy cannot easily be reconciled. Kadushin sees more practical value in normal mysticism, the complex but decidedly non-supernatural everyday religious experience of any pious and observant Jew.

=== "A Conceptual Commentary to the Mekilta" (1969) ===
In this work, Kadushin outlined his approach to understanding and analyzing Rabbinic texts, specifically the Aggada, and henceforth used his principles to provide a commentary to the Mekhilta d'Rabbi Ishmael (used the critical Lauterbach edition), divided into segments from Tractate Pisha and Tracate Beshalach.

=== "A Conceptual Commentary on Midrash Leviticus Rabbah" (1987) ===
These two volumes represent Kadushin's efforts to apply his system of hermeneutics to classic rabbinic texts.

== Quotations ==
"What is not defined usually cannot be defined."

"Torah is not only personified, but possesses the quality of a personality."

"[S]piritual experience in most religions is seldom an unmixed blessing. Left to itself, uncontrolled, it may manifest itself in the most absurd of human vagaries and sanctify not only unsocial but anti-social behavior and utterly callous selfishness."
