= Moshe Davis =

Moshe Davis (January 12, 1916 in Brooklyn, New York – April 19, 1996) was a rabbi and a scholar of American Jewish history who taught at the Jewish Theological Seminary of America (JTS) and Hebrew University.

== Biography ==
He was recipient of a BA from Columbia University in 1936, a BA from the Jewish Theological Seminary's Teachers Institute in 1937, rabbinic ordination from the Jewish Theological Seminary in 1942, and a Ph.D. from Hebrew University in Jerusalem in 1945. Davis was the first American to earn a doctorate at Hebrew University.

He held a variety of leadership positions at JTS, including serving as professor of American Jewish history, and at Hebrew University, where he was named the Stephen S. Wise Chair of American Jewish History and Institutions. In 1959, upon taking up his post in Israel, Davis established the Institute of Contemporary Jewry at the Hebrew University of Jerusalem.

His numerous books include The Emergence of Conservative Judaism (1963) and Israel: Its Role In Civilization (1956).

Davis has been credited with being the creator of the academic field of America-Holy Land Studies, the field of studies focusing on the relationship between America and the Land of Israel.

The Camp Ramah network of Jewish camps was also founded under the guidance of Davis and Sylvia Ettenberg. As part of his efforts to build Hebrew language institutions in the United States, Davis also played a role in founding the college student organization Histadrut Hanoar Ha'Ivri, the Hebrew Arts Foundation, the Massad camps, and the Hebrew Arts School for Music and Dance.
