= Gerson D. Cohen =

American rabbi and academic (1924–1991)

Personal life
- Born: August 26, 1924 New York City
- Died: August 15, 1991 (aged 66) New York City
- Spouse: Naomi
- Children: 2
- Education: City College of New York, Jewish Theological Seminary of America, Columbia University

Religious life
- Religion: Judaism
- Denomination: Conservative

Jewish leader
- Position: Chancellor of the Jewish Theological Seminary of America
- Began: 1972
- Ended: 1986

Gerson David Cohen (August 26, 1924 – August 15, 1991) was a Jewish historian, a Conservative rabbi, and the Chancellor of the Jewish Theological Seminary of America from 1972 to 1986. He was born in New York in 1924 and graduated from City College of New York in 1944. Cohen received his bachelor's degree, master's degree, and rabbinic ordination (1948) from the Jewish Theological Seminary of America. He received his Ph.D. in Semitic Languages at Columbia University in 1958.

Cohen served as Gustav Gottheil Lecturer at Columbia University and in a number of posts at the Jewish Theological Seminary. His posts at the Seminary included Librarian (1950–1957), Lecturer (1957–1960), Visiting Assistant Professor (1961–1964), Visiting Professor (1964–1970), and Jacob H. Schiff Professor of History (1970–1991). He was named Chancellor of the Seminary in 1972.

Cohen is especially noted for ordaining the first female rabbi in Conservative Judaism in 1985. As Chancellor, he appointed a special commission to study the issue of ordaining women as rabbis in 1977.

Cohen died in New York in 1991.
