= Jewish Theological Seminary of America =

Religious education organization in New York, New York

Jewish Theological Seminary
- Motto: וְהַסְּנֶה אֵינֶנּוּ אֻכָּל
- Motto in English: And the bush was not consumed – Exodus 3:2
- Type: Private nonprofit
- Established: 1886; 140 years ago
- Accreditation: MSCHE
- Religious affiliation: Conservative Judaism
- Chancellor: Shuly Rubin Schwartz
- Provost: Jeffrey Kress
- Location: New York City, United States; 40°48′43″N 73°57′37″W
- Campus: Urban
- Facebook: Jewish Theological Seminary on Facebook
- Website: www.jtsa.edu

The Jewish Theological Seminary (JTS) is a Conservative Jewish education organization in New York City. It is one of the academic and spiritual centers of Conservative Judaism as well as a hub for academic scholarship in Jewish studies. The Jewish Theological Seminary Library is one of the most significant collections of Judaica in the world.

The JTS was founded in 1886 by Sabato Morais and Henry Pereira Mendes.

== History ==
=== Seminary's founding: Morais era (1886–1897) ===
The Jewish Theological Seminary (JTS) was founded in 1886 through the efforts of two distinguished rabbis, Sabato Morais and Henry Pereira Mendes, along with a group of prominent lay leaders from Sephardic congregations in Philadelphia and New York. Its mission was to preserve the knowledge and practice of historical Judaism. In 1887, JTS held its first class of ten students in the vestry of the Spanish-Portuguese Synagogue, New York City's oldest congregation.

About this time in North America, the Reform movement was growing at a rapid pace, alarming more traditional (halakhic) Jews. Sabato Morais, rabbi of Philadelphia's Congregation Mikveh Israel championed the reaction to American Reform. At one time, Morais had been a voice for moderation and bridge-building among the Reformers. He opposed the more radical changes but was open to moderate changes that would not significantly depart from tradition. After the Reform movement published the Pittsburgh Platform in late 1885, Morais recognized the futility of his efforts and began to work with like-minded rabbis to strengthen the Orthodox institutions.

One of the tools his group used was creating a new rabbinical school in New York City. The "Jewish Theological Seminary Association" was founded with Morais as its President in 1886 as an Orthodox institution to combat the hegemony of the Reform movement. The school was hosted by Henry Pereira Mendes' Congregation Shearith Israel, a sister synagogue to Mikveh Israel.

Morais and Mendes were soon joined by Alexander Kohut and Bernard Drachman, both of whom had received semikhah, rabbinic ordination, at Rabbi Frankel's Breslau seminary. They shaped the curriculum and philosophy of the new school after Rabbi Frankel's seminary. The first graduate to be ordained, in 1894, was Joseph Hertz, who would go on to become the Chief Rabbi of the United Kingdom and Commonwealth.

Morais was president of the Jewish Theological Seminary of America until he died in 1897.

=== Schechter era (1902–1915) ===
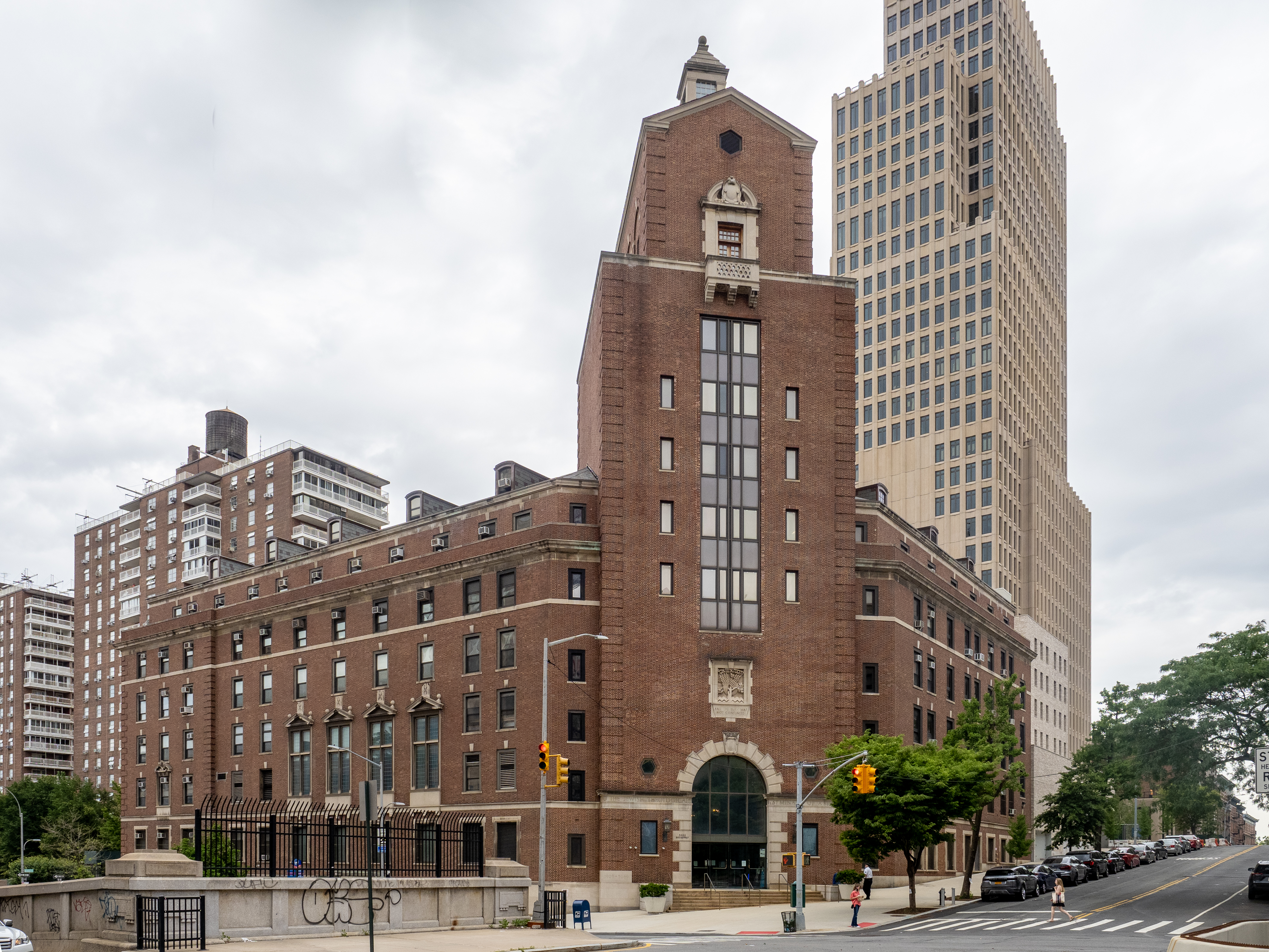
JTS building at 3080 Broadway in Manhattan

After Morais's death, Mendes led the school, but the association's financial position became precarious, and Mendes lacked the resources to turn it around. In October 1901, a new organization was projected entitled the "Jewish Theological Seminary of America", with which the association was invited to incorporate. This arrangement was carried into effect April 14, 1902. The new organization was endowed with a fund of over $500,000 and was presented with a suitable building on University Heights, Bronx by Jacob H. Schiff. It obtained a charter from the state of New York (approved Feb. 20, 1902), "for the perpetuation of the tenets of the Jewish religion, the cultivation of Hebrew literature, the pursuit of Biblical and archeological research, the advancement of Jewish scholarship, the establishment of a library, and the education and training of Jewish rabbis and teachers. It is empowered to grant and confer the degrees of Rabbi, Ḥazan, Master and Doctor of Hebrew Literature, and Doctor of Divinity, and also to award certificates of proficiency to persons qualified to teach in Hebrew schools." The reorganized seminary was opened on Sept. 15, 1902, in the old building of the Theological Seminary Association at 736 Lexington Avenue. A search was executed for a new president.

Solomon Schechter was recruited from Great Britain. His religious approach seemed compatible with JTS's, and he assumed the presidency, as well as serving as Professor of Jewish theology. In a series of papers, he articulated an ideology for the nascent movement of Conservative Judaism. Many of the Orthodox rabbis associated with JTS vehemently disagreed with him, and left the institution. About 100 days after Schechter's appointment, the Union of Orthodox Rabbis formed, principally in protest, and declared that they would not accept any new ordinations from JTS, though previous recipients were still welcome. The more moderate Orthodox Union (OU), however, maintained some ties to JTS, and some of its rabbis, including Drachman, continued to teach there.

In 1913, Schechter directed the creation of the United Synagogue of America, as a formal group for member synagogues who subscribed to his philosophy. The group has been strongly aligned with JTS from its inception to the present day.

Along with Schechter and Bernard Drachman, professors at the seminary at the time included: Louis Ginzberg, professor of Talmud; Alexander Marx, professor of history and rabbinic literature and librarian; Israel Friedländer, professor of Bible; Joseph Mayor Asher, professor of homiletics; and Joshua A. Joffe, instructor in Talmud. In 1905, Israel Davidson joined the faculty, teaching Hebrew and Rabbinics. According to David Ellenson and Lee Bycel, "each of these men was a distinguished scholar, and the academic reputation of the Seminary soared with the addition of these men to the faculty. ... Schechter was determined to carve out the highest academic reputation for the Seminary."

The rabbinical school had very high academic standards. The curriculum focused mainly on Talmud, legal codes, and classical rabbinic literature, but aside from a little time for a homiletics class, very little time was spent on practical training for serving in a rabbinical position.

As of 1904, there were 37 students in the theological department, and 120 students took a set of courses designed for teachers. This set of courses later evolved into the Teachers Institute.

Mordechai Kaplan joined the faculty during this period, becoming professor of homiletics following Joseph Mayor Asher's death. Kaplan became the first principal of the Teachers Institute (TI), which opened in 1909. A majority of TI students were women, partly because teaching was perceived as a women's profession and partly because the Teachers Institute was one of the few institutions where women could pursue advanced education in Jewish studies. The Teachers Institute offered both undergraduate and graduate degrees. The undergraduate division is now the Albert A. List College of Jewish Studies, and the graduate division is the William Davidson Graduate School of Jewish Education.

=== Adler era (1915–1940) ===
In 1915, Schechter was succeeded by Cyrus Adler, the President of Dropsie College. A member of the board with impressive academic qualifications, he was initially seen as an interim replacement for Schechter. Adler went on to serve as President until 1940.

During the 1920s, Adler explored the possibility of a merger with Yeshiva University, but the Orthodox leaders of Yeshiva University viewed JTS as insufficiently Orthodox.

New faculty appointed during the early part of Adler's tenure included the Biblical scholar Jacob Hoschander. In the 1920s, Boaz Cohen and Louis Finkelstein, both of whom were ordained at JTS and completed their doctoral degrees at Columbia University, joined the Talmud faculty. In the 1930s, Adler appointed H.L. Ginsberg, Robert Gordis, and Alexander Sperber as professors of Bible. He also gave appointments to Israel Efros, Simon Greenberg, Milton Steinberg, and Ismar Elbogen. Rabbi Moses Hyamson was appointed Professor Emeritus of Codes in 1915, serving until 1940.

During his tenure, Adler groomed Louis Finkelstein as his chosen successor. In 1931, he appointed Finkelstein to a full professorship. Finkelstein became the Solomon Schechter Professor of Theology. In 1937 Adler appointed Finkelstein as Provost.

In 1930 the organization commissioned a new headquarters for 122nd Street and Broadway in a neo-colonial style, with a tower at the corner. The architects were Gehron, Ross and Alley.

In 1931, the Seminary College of Jewish Studies was established for students who wanted college-level courses in Jewish studies but who were not preparing for teaching careers. This branch is now part of the Albert A. List College of Jewish Studies.

=== Finkelstein era (1940–1972) ===
Louis Finkelstein became chancellor of the Jewish Theological Seminary in 1940. During his chancellorship, JTS made significant efforts to engage the American public. One of its signature programs was a radio and television show called The Eternal Light. The show aired on Sunday afternoons, featuring well-known Jewish personalities like Chaim Potok and Elie Wiesel. Broadcasts did not involve preaching or prayer, but drew on history, literature and social issues to explore Judaism and Jewish holidays in a manner that was accessible to persons of any faith. The show continued to run until 1985.

During the 1940s, the Jewish Theological Seminary established Camp Ramah as a tool for furthering Jewish education. The founders envisioned an informal camp setting where Jewish youth would reconnect with the synagogue and Jewish tradition, and a new cadre of American-born Jewish leadership could be cultivated. The first camp opened in Conover, Wisconsin in 1947. The program was drawn up by Moshe Davis and Sylvia Ettenberg of the JTS Teachers' Institute.

In 1945, JTS established a new institution, the Leadership Training Fellowship, designed to educate young people within Conservative synagogues and guide them into Jewish public service.

In 1952, the Jewish Theological Seminary opened a new school known as the Cantors Institute. (The school was later renamed the H. L. Miller Cantorial School and College of Jewish Music.) This was at roughly the same time that the other established American Jewish seminaries, Hebrew Union College and Yeshiva University, opened cantorial schools. Prior to this time, American cantors were often trained in Europe.

In 1950, Finkelstein created the Universal Brotherhood program, which "brought together laymen interested in interpreting the ethical dimensions of Judaism to the wider society." JTS expanded its public outreach in the 1950s with Finkelstein's development of JTS's Institute for Religious Studies and the establishment of its Herbert H. Lehman Institute of Ethics.

During the Finkelstein era, the Institute for Religious and Social Studies brought together Protestant, Roman Catholic and Jewish scholars for theological discussions. (In 1986, the name of the institute was changed to the Finkelstein Institute for Religious and Social Studies in Finkelstein's honor.)

In 1957, JTS announced plans to build a satellite campus in Jerusalem for JTS rabbinical students studying in Israel. A building was completed in 1962. (The campus eventually evolved into the home of the Schechter Institute of Jewish Studies.) In 1962, the seminary also acquired the Schocken Institute for Jewish Research and its library in Jerusalem.

In 1968, JTS received a charter from the State of New York to create an Institute for Advanced Studies in the Humanities, which conferred bachelor's, master's, and doctoral degrees. The Institute was designed as a non-sectarian academic institute which would train future college and university professors. Its first students enrolled in 1970. The Institute later evolved into the Graduate School of the Jewish Theological Seminary.

==== Faculty during the Finkelstein era ====
When Finkelstein took office, prominent faculty members included Louis Ginzberg, Alexander Marx, Mordecai Kaplan, H.L. Ginsberg, Robert Gordis, and Boaz Cohen.

In 1940, Finkelstein made his most significant academic appointment, hiring the prominent Talmud scholar Saul Lieberman as Professor of Palestinian Literature and Institutions. In 1948, Lieberman became dean of the Rabbinical School. In 1958, he was named rector of the Seminary.

In 1945, Finkelstein hired the theologian Abraham Joshua Heschel, who had been teaching for a brief period at Hebrew Union College. During the course of his chancellorship, Finkelstein also gave academic appointments to other prominent scholars including Moshe Davis (1942), Shalom Spiegel (1943), Yochanan Muffs (1954), Max Kadushin (1960), Gerson Cohen, David Weiss Halivni, Judah Goldin, Chaim Dimitrovsky, and Seymour Siegel.

Finkelstein appointed Max Arzt to serve as Vice-Chancellor of JTS in 1951, and he appointed Arzt as Israel Goldstein Professor of Practical Theology in 1962.

The Jewish Theological Seminary, JTS, is the primary educational and religious center of Conservative Judaism. The single largest physical addition to JTS came in the form of seventeen-foot wrought iron gates. The beautifully constructed gates led to the main entrance through a large vaulted passageway to the entire group of buildings. In a 1930s guidebook, it is written about the Seminary, "Be sure to notice the main gate to the seminary as you go in. It is hand-wrought iron and the whole design is symbolic." These gates were presented on September 26, 1934, by Mrs. Frieda and Mr. Felix M. Warburg in memory of her parents, Jacob H. and Therese Schiff.

==== Library fire ====
In April 1966 JTS's library caught fire. 70,000 books were destroyed, and many others were damaged.

=== The Cohen era (1972–1986) ===
Gerson D. Cohen became Chancellor of the Jewish Theological Seminary in 1972.

Prominent faculty during Cohen's chancellorship included David Weiss Halivni of the Talmud Department and José Faur. Both of these scholars resigned when the JTS faculty voted to ordain women as rabbis and as cantors in 1983.

Yochanan Muffs, who had joined the JTS faculty in 1954, was a prominent professor of Bible. Max Kadushin, who had joined the JTS faculty in 1960, taught ethics and rabbinic thought until his death in 1980.

In 1972, Cohen appointed Avraham Holtz as the dean of academic development. Neil Gillman served as Dean of the JTS Rabbinical School for much of the Cohen chancellorship. Morton Leifman served as Dean of the Cantors Institute.

Cohen oversaw the appointment of Judith Hauptman as the first female professor of Talmud at JTS. Hauptman began teaching at JTS in 1973.

Joel Roth, who had begun teaching at JTS in 1968, was appointed Associate Professor of Talmud upon completing his Ph.D. at JTS in 1973. Roth went on to serve as the dean of the Rabbinical School from 1981 to 1984. He was succeeded by Gordon Tucker, who became dean of the Rabbinical School in 1984.

In June 1973, the Seminary's Institute for Advanced Studies in the Humanities was granted permission to grant Ph.D. degrees in Jewish History, Bible, Talmud, Jewish philosophy, and Hebrew. In 1975, the Seminary replaced the Institute for Advanced Studies in the Humanities with the Graduate School of the Jewish Theological Seminary, which brought together JTS's non-theological academic training programs. Cohen appointed historian Ismar Schorsch as the first dean of the Graduate School.

==== Admission of female students ====
Beginning in the 1970s, the topic of women's ordination was regularly discussed at JTS. Women who unsuccessfully sought admission to the rabbinical school during the 1970s included Susannah Heschel, daughter of JTS faculty member Abraham Joshua Heschel. There was a special commission appointed by the chancellor of the Jewish Theological Seminary of America (Gerson D. Cohen) to study the issue of ordaining women as rabbis, which met between 1977 and 1978, and consisted of 11 men and three women. The women were Marian Siner Gordon, an attorney; Rivkah Harris, an Assyriologist; and Francine Klagsbrun, a writer. After years of discussion, the JTS faculty voted to ordain women as rabbis and as cantors in 1983.

The first female rabbi to graduate from the school, and the first female Conservative Jewish rabbi in the world, was Amy Eilberg, who graduated and was ordained as a rabbi in 1985. The first class of female rabbis that was admitted to JTS in 1984 included Naomi Levy, who later became a best-selling author and Nina Beth Cardin, who became an author and environmental activist. Erica Lippitz and Marla Rosenfeld Barugel were the first women ordained as cantors by JTS and the first female Conservative Jewish cantors in the world. They were both ordained in 1987.

=== Schorsch era (1986–2006) ===
Ismar Schorsch became Chancellor of JTS in 1986.

Among his accomplishments was creating the William Davidson Graduate School of Jewish Education, which was established through an endowment by William Davidson of Detroit in 1994.

Michael Greenbaum served as Vice Chancellor of The Jewish Theological Seminary.

Prominent faculty in the Talmud and Rabbinics department during Schorsch's chancellorship included Joel Roth, Mayer Rabinowitz, David C. Kraemer and Judith Hauptman. Hauptman was the first woman appointed to teach Talmud at JTS. The Bible department included David Marcus and Stephen A. Geller. The Jewish literature Department included David G. Roskies. The Jewish history department included Jack Wertheimer and Shuly Rubin Schwartz. The Jewish Philosophy department included Neil Gillman and Shaul Magid. In 2004, Alan Mittleman joined the Jewish Philosophy department and became head of JTS's Louis Finkelstein Institute for Religious and Social Studies.

The number of advanced programs in the Graduate School grew over the course of Schorsch's tenure. The Graduate School came to describe itself as being "the most extensive academic program in advanced Judaica in North America."

Gordon Tucker's tenure as dean of the Rabbinical School ended in 1992. His predecessor, Joel Roth, again became dean, serving in 1992–1993. Roth was succeeded by William Lebeau, who served as dean from 1993 to 1999. Lebeau was succeeded by Alan Kensky, and then Lebeau became dean of the Rabbinical School again in June 2002.

In 1998, Henry Rosenblum was appointed Dean of the H.L. Miller Cantorial School and College of Jewish Music at the Jewish Theological Seminary in 1998, becoming the first Hazzan to hold that position. Rosenblum remained in this position until 2010.

=== Eisen era (2007–2020) ===
Arnold Eisen, Koshland Professor of Jewish Culture and Religion and Chair of the Department of Religious Studies at Stanford University, took office as Chancellor-elect on July 1, 2006, the day after Schorsch stepped down. Eisen assumed the position full-time on July 1, 2007.

Eisen is the second non-rabbi, after Cyrus Adler, to hold this post. He is also the first person with a social science background to serve as Chancellor; previous chancellors had backgrounds in Jewish history or Talmud.

In January 2007, at the start of Eisen's chancellorship, Daniel S. Nevins was named the Dean of the Rabbinical School of the Jewish Theological Seminary of America, succeeding William H. Lebeau. Biblical scholar Alan Cooper was named Provost. In 2010, Henry Rosenblum left the H.L. Miller Cantorial School as part of JTS's restructuring efforts, and Nevins also became responsible for oversight of the H.L. Miller Cantorial School.

In June 2009, Goldman Sachs executive Abby Joseph Cohen was named Chairman of the Board of JTS, the first woman to hold the position.

Also in 2009, with funding from the Charles H. Revson Foundation and the Booth Ferris Foundation, JTS established The Center for Pastoral Education with the goal of teaching the art of pastoral care to seminary students and ordained clergy of all faiths. The Center was developed by Mychal Springer, formerly an Associate Dean of the Rabbinical School. Springer became the Center's first director.

In 2010, the Tikvah Fund endowed a new institute at JTS, the Tikvah Institute for Jewish Thought, which is "devoted to the intellectual encounter between the best sources of Jewish and broader Western reflection on the deepest problems of human life." According to the Seminary, "JTS was selected by the Tikvah Fund based on its academic excellence and its mission to advance Jewish life in the modern world." Alan Mittleman, Chair of the Department of Jewish Thought, was appointed as its director.

Burton L. Visotzky was appointed to replace Mittleman as director of the Louis Finkelstein Institute for Religious and Social Studies. His early work as director of the Finkelstein Institute focused on Muslim-Jewish dialogue. In October 2010, a group of prominent Muslim and Jewish scholars and leaders, joined by the heads of several Christian seminaries, met at JTS for two days to discuss and compare the situations of Islam and Judaism in America.

In May 2011, Eisen launched "Conservative Judaism: A Community Conversation," an interactive website featuring original essays on Conservative Judaism, with responses from Movement and Lay leaders and scholars.

Eisen was succeeded as Chancellor by Shuly Rubin Schwartz, Irving Lehrman Research Professor of American Jewish History at JTS, who had previously served as dean (1993-2018) of the Albert A. List College of Jewish Studies, JTS’s undergraduate dual-degree program with Columbia University and Barnard College. In 2010, she was also named dean of the Gershon Kekst Graduate School. In 2018, she assumed the provostship, while continuing as dean of the Kekst School. Dr. Schwartz became the first female Chancellor in the 134 year history of JTS. Chancellor Schwartz appointed Rabbi Ayelet S. Cohen as Dean of the Rabbinical School and the Division of Religious Leadership in 2022.

On April 30, 2026 it was announced that Rabbi Michael Uram would be the next Chancellor.

==== Admission of LGBT students ====
Since March 2007, JTS has accepted openly gay, lesbian, and bisexual students into their rabbinical and cantorial programs (the seminary's other three schools upheld such non-discrimination policies before this date). A survey conducted before the decision indicated that 58% of the rabbinical student body supported this change. The school issued a press release announcing the new admission policy, without taking a stance on same-sex unions. JTS marked the first anniversary of the change with a special program. Some students who opposed the change in admission policy said they felt excluded from the day's program because it did not sufficiently acknowledge the diversity within the student body. In April 2011, JTS held a Yom Iyyun, or day of learning, about LGBTQ issues, and their intersection with Judaism. Joy Ladin, a transgender woman who taught English at Yeshiva University, gave a talk about her life. Other programs included creating welcoming communities and inclusive prayer, among others. It was sponsored in part by Keshet, a Jewish social action group for LGBTQ people.

== JTS and the Conservative movement ==
JTS was the founding institution of Conservative Judaism in America. The United Synagogue of America, the organization of Conservative synagogues, was founded by Solomon Schechter while he served as President of JTS. In the context of the pre-Finkelstein era, Orthodox Rabbi Nosson Scherman stated that "in its early years the JTS was what today might be called Modern Orthodox."

During the chancellorship of Louis Finkelstein, however, there were many tensions between JTS and the Conservative Judaism movement which it led. JTS was often more traditional in matters of religious practice than the denomination as a whole. When Jacob Neusner applied to JTS during the Finkelstein era, in 1954, he like other applicants "had to sign a pledge saying they would abide by traditional Jewish law." Finkelstein was also perceived as focusing on American and world Jewry as a whole while paying little attention to the Conservative movement.

According to scholar Michael Panitz, the situation changed under Finkelstein's successors. Under Chancellor Gerson Cohen (chancellor from 1972 to 1986), JTS "decisively embraced its identity as a Conservative Jewish institution, it thereby abandoned its earlier hopes to provide a non-denominational unifier for traditional and moderate American Jews." The next chancellor, Ismar Schorsch (1986–2006), "emerged as an outspoken advocate for Conservative Judaism." With the new mission statement introduced by Chancellor Arnold Eisen (2007–), the school has positioned itself as serving both "Conservative Judaism" and "the vital religious center."

As of 2010, JTS's website describes JTS as "the academic and spiritual center of Conservative Judaism worldwide." Others describe it as "the academic and spiritual centre of Conservative Judaism in the United States." A second important center for Conservative Judaism in the United States is the Ziegler School of Rabbinic Studies in California, founded by graduates of JTS in 1996.

== Current educational programs ==
=== Rabbinical School ===
The Rabbinical School describes itself as offering "an intensive program of study, personal growth, and spiritual development that leads to rabbinic ordination and a career of service to the Jewish community."

As of 2010, the rabbinical school requires five or six years of study. Its curriculum requires extensive study of Talmud, midrash, Bible, Jewish history, Hebrew language, and various professional skills. Students are required to spend the second year of the program at the Schechter Institute of Jewish Studies in Jerusalem.

Students must choose a field of concentration during their studies. Concentrations include:

- Bible
- Rabbinics
- Midrash
- Jewish history
- Jewish literature
- Jewish liturgy
- Jewish education
- Jewish philosophy
- Jewish women's studies
- Pastoral care

=== Cantorial school ===
The cantorial school describes itself as training "select advanced students as hazzanim (cantors) for congregational service or as teachers of Jewish music, choral directors, composers, or research scholars."

The school is technically divided into two parts: the entity formally known as the H. L. Miller Cantorial School invests students as hazzanim, while the entity known as the College of Jewish Music awards the master's degree in Sacred Music. All students in the Cantorial School are enrolled in both programs simultaneously.

At present, the first year of cantorial school at JTS is generally spent in Israel. The curriculum during the five years focuses on three main areas: general music, Jewish music and Jewish text study.

=== Graduate school ===
The graduate school of the Jewish Theological Seminary offers academic programs in advanced Jewish studies. It describes itself as offering "the most extensive academic program in advanced Judaic Studies in North America". The school grants MA, DHL, and PhD degrees in the areas of:

- Ancient Judaism
- Bible and Ancient Semitic Languages
- Interdepartmental Studies (MA only)
- Jewish Art and Visual Culture (MA only)
- Jewish History
- Jewish Literature
- Jewish philosophy
- Jewish Studies and Public Administration (MA only)
- Jewish Studies and Social Work (MA only)
- Jewish Women’s Studies (MA only)
- Liturgy
- Medieval Jewish Studies
- Midrash
- Modern Jewish Studies
- Talmud and Rabbinics

=== William Davidson Graduate School of Jewish Education ===
In 1994, William Davidson of Detroit, Michigan established a $15 million endowment at JTS to fund the William Davidson Graduate School of Jewish Education, which trains educators who can serve in Jewish institutions and elsewhere, in both formal and informal settings. The Davidson School offers both master's and doctoral degrees.

=== List College ===
Albert A. List College of Jewish Studies (List College) is the undergraduate school of JTSA. It is closely affiliated with Columbia University; almost all List College students are enrolled in dual-degree programs with either Columbia University’s School of General Studies or Barnard College.

== Additional institutes at JTS ==
- Tikvah Institute for Jewish Thought – devoted to the intellectual encounter between the best sources of Jewish and broader Western reflection on the deepest problems of human life.
- Melton Research Center for Jewish Education – focuses on improving the quality of Jewish education in North America.
- Louis Finkelstein Institute for Religious and Social Studies – focuses on interfaith relations and public affairs.
- Saul Lieberman Institute for Talmudic Research – develops modern and rigorous computer tools for Talmud study.
- Institute for Jewish Learning – focuses on advanced adult education.
- Center for Pastoral Education – focuses on the art of pastoral care.

== Notable alumni ==
JTS has graduated a number of key figures throughout its history. Among the most notable are:

- Bella Abzug, lawyer, Congresswoman, social activist, feminist leader
- Amy Eilberg, first female rabbi ordained in Conservative Judaism.
- Joseph H. Hertz, British Chief Rabbi and author; first graduate of JTS
- Chaim Potok, author and rabbi

== See also ==
- List of Jewish universities and colleges in the United States
- Rabbinical Assembly
- Cantors Assembly
- Conservative Judaism
- Rabbinic cabinet
- Gladstein Fellowship
- Masorti on Campus
