= Bradley Shavit Artson =

American rabbi

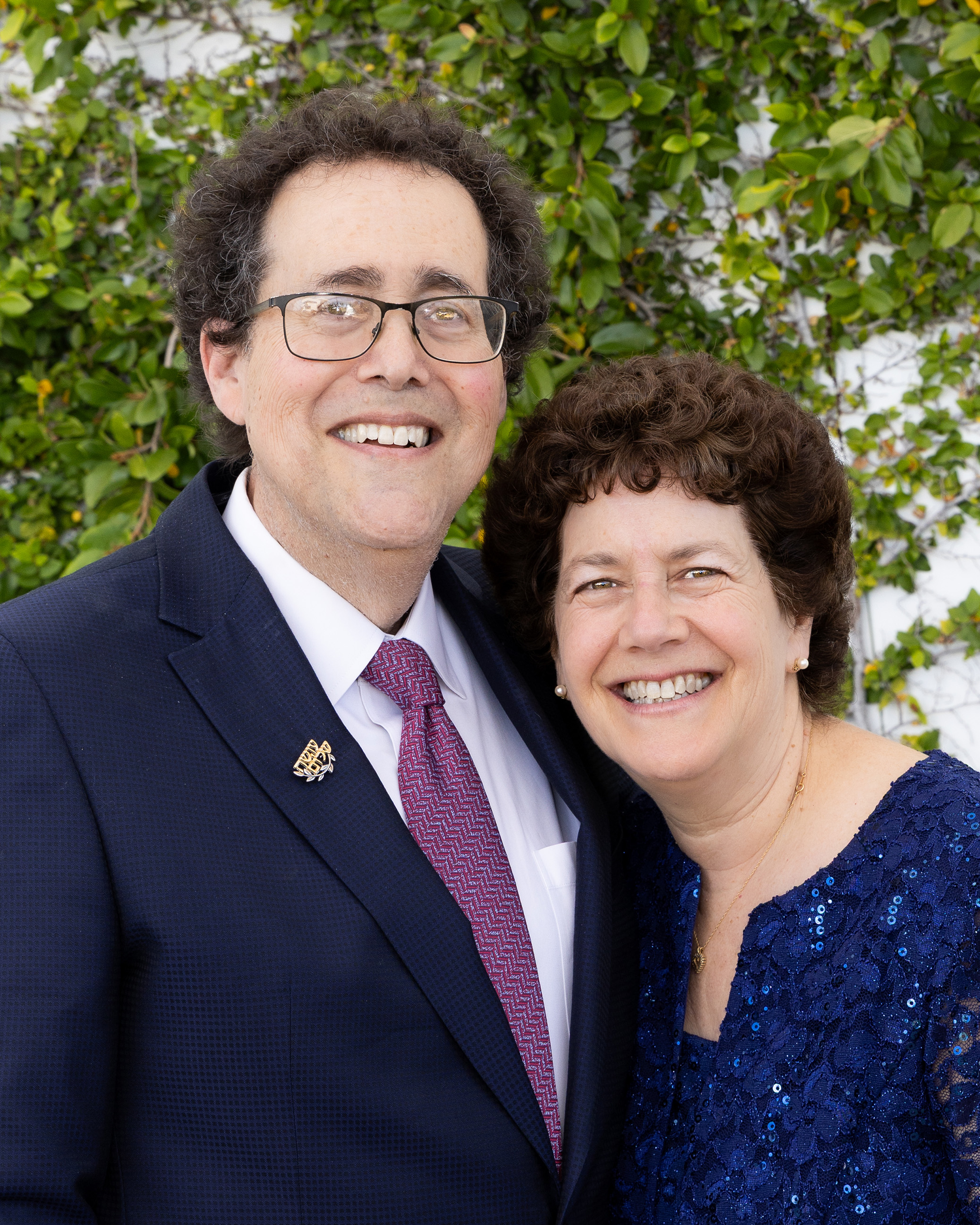
- Bradley and Elana Shavit Artson at the 2026 AJU Gala
- Born: 1959 (age 66–67); San Francisco, California
- Education: Harvard College
- Occupations: Rabbi, author, speaker

Bradley Shavit Artson (born 1959) is an American rabbi, author and speaker. He serves as the Goldstine Distinguished Scholar at American Jewish University (AJU), after having held, for 26 years, the Abner and Roslyn Goldstine Dean's Chair of the Ziegler School of Rabbinic Studies at AJU, where he is also a Vice-President. He supervised the Louis and Judith Miller Introduction to Judaism Program and provided educational and religious oversight for two Camp Ramah campuses, Ojai and Monterey Bay. He is the Rabbinic Leader of the Abraham Joshua Heschel Seminary at the University of Potsdam in Germany, ordaining Conservative/Masorti rabbis for Europe.

== Education and career ==
Born and raised in San Francisco, Artson received an A.B. degree from Harvard College, cum laude, in 1981. As an undergraduate, he served as the LBJ Intern for United States Representative Burton and was an intern for United States Senator Alan Cranston. Following graduation, Artson was a Legislative Assistant to the Speaker of the California Assembly for two years and was ordained with honors by the Jewish Theological Seminary in 1988. He wrote his first book, Love Peace and Pursue Peace: A Jewish Response to War and Nuclear Annihilation while in rabbinical school. During his last year at rabbinical school, he served as the part-time rabbinic intern at Bolton Street Synagogue in Baltimore.

For ten years, Artson served as the rabbi of Congregation Eilat in Mission Viejo, California, which grew under his tenure from about 200 families to over 600. During that period, his Introduction to Judaism course helped over 200 people convert to Judaism, with many of his congregants eventually entering the rabbinate.

From 1998 to 1999, Artson was a member of the Senior Management of the Jewish Federation of Greater Los Angeles and served as the Executive Vice President of the Board of Rabbis of Southern California. In 1999, he began his work at the University of Judaism (now the American Jewish University). In addition to his work as rabbinical school dean and university vice president, Artson received his D.H.L. at Hebrew Union College – Jewish Institute of Religion in Contemporary Jewish Theology, under the supervision of Rabbi Dr. David Ellenson.

His scholarly fields are Jewish philosophy and theology, with an emphasis on a process approach to integrating contemporary scientific insights from cosmology, quantum mechanics, evolution, and neuroscience into a dynamic view of God, Torah, mitzvot, and ethics. He is a charter member of the Association for the Social Scientific Study of Jewry.

== Leadership ==
A prominent leader of Conservative Judaism, Artson serves on the Leadership Council of Conservative Judaism. He supervises the Miller Introduction to Judaism Program and the Center for Jewish Outreach at American Jewish University and he mentored Camp Ramah in California. Rabbi Artson wrote a weekly Torah commentary that had over 13,000 internet subscribers. He is the author of 14 books, most recently Renewing the Process of Creation: A Jewish Integration of Science and Spirit and God of Becoming & Relationship: The Dynamic Nature of Process Theology both published by Jewish Lights. He is a regular contributor to Huffington Post, the Times of Israel, and he has written over 300 articles in several journals and magazines.

He is also the rabbinic leader of the Abraham Joshua Heschel Seminary and was the founding Dean of the Zacharias Frankel College both at the University of Potsdam, Germany, ordaining Conservative/Masorti rabbis for Europe under the religious supervision of the Ziegler School of Rabbinic Studies.

In 2008, Artson ordained Rabbi Gershom Sizomu, the leader of the Abayudaya Tribe and participated a rabbinic delegation to Uganda to install him as the first African rabbi in Sub-Saharan Africa. While in Africa he joined a Beit Din in converting 250 Africans from Kenya, Nigeria, South Africa, Ghana, and Uganda. A regional chief bestowed upon him the African name Walusansa Salongo.

Artson launched the Walking With … series, an annual series of books distributed free of charge and available on the web as complimentary PDF files . In 2007 he produced Walking With God, in 2008, Walking With Justice, in 2009, Walking With Life, and in 2010, Walking With the Jewish Calendar. For the past few years he has also produced an annual Selichot DVD, Choose Life, a series of conversations with Rabbi Artson, Rabbi David Wolpe, Rabbi Naomi Levy, Rabbi Edward Feinstein, and Rabbi Sharon Brous. It can be viewed at . Under his direction, the Ziegler School sponsored a podcast page that presents the monthly discussions of Rabbi Artson, a Rebbe's Tish of Reb Mimi Feigelson, lessons on the Siddur and prayer by Rabbi Elliot Dorff, and a Halakhah Yomi by Rabbi Aaron Alexander.

Artson has served on the faculty of the Wexner Heritage Foundation and as a speaker for UJC/Federation communities.

Artson, together with his deputy dean Rabbi Cheryl Peretz, were the subject of an internal investigation at AJU that took place in 2024, which found no ethics code violations. The investigation was prompted by complaints, made over the previous two decades by 3 former rabbinical students, alleging a pattern of male favoritism and disrespectful treatment. The investigation completed in June 2024, although the full report was not released publicly, AJU did release an authorized summary. The Rabbinical Assembly undertook a similar probe, which concluded in 2025, also finding Rabbi Artson and Rabbi Peretz innocent of all major accusations.

== Personal ==
Artson is married to Elana Shavit Artson, and they are the parents of twins, Shira and Jacob.

== Bibliography ==
- Renewing the Process of Creation: A Jewish Integration of Science and Spirit (Jewish Lights)
- God of Becoming and Relationship: The Dynamic Nature of Process Theology (Jewish Lights)
- Passing Life's Tests: Spiritual Reflections on the Trial of Abraham, The Binding of Isaac (Jewish Lights)
- The Everyday Torah: Weekly Reflections and Inspirations (McGraw Hill)
- Gift of Soul, Gift of Wisdom: Spiritual Resources for Leadership & Mentoring (Behrman House)
- The Bedside Torah: Wisdom, Visions, and Dreams (McGraw Hill)
- It's A Mitzvah! (Behrman House)
- Making A Difference (Behrman House)
- Love Peace & Pursue Peace (United Synagogue)
- Jewish Answers to Real-Life Questions (Alef Design Group)
- I Have Some Questions About God (Torah Aura Productions)

== See also ==
- American philosophy
