= Otto Schimek =

WWII Austrian soldier, pacifist

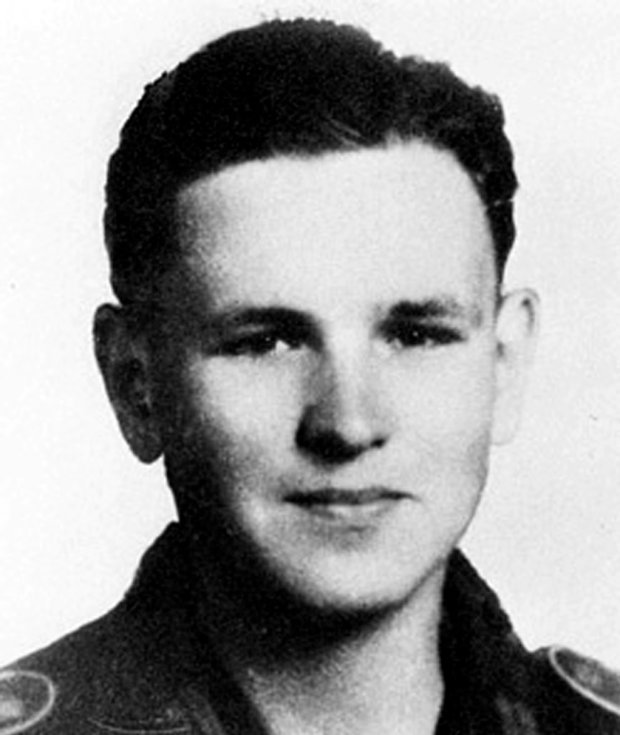
Otto Schimek

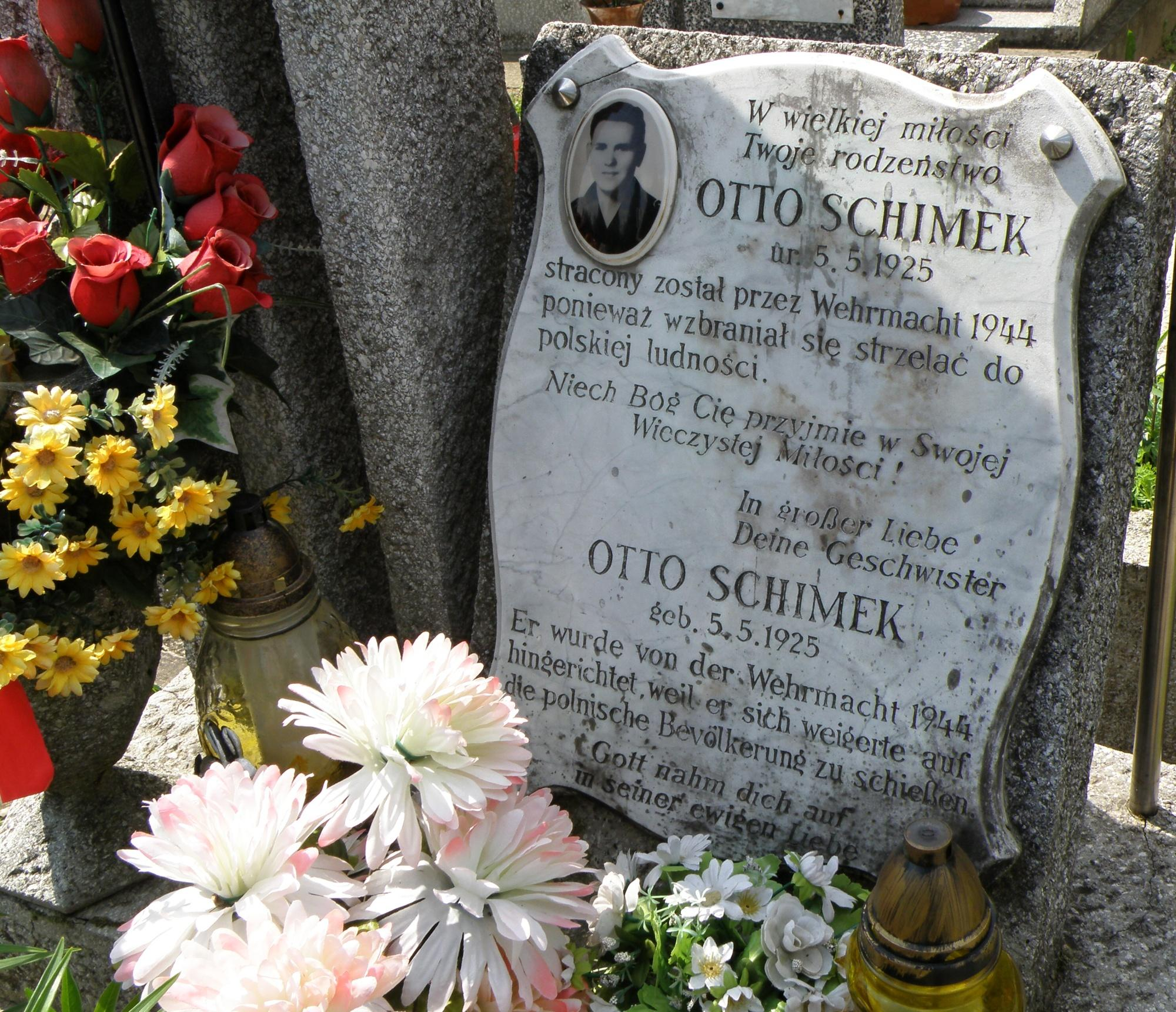
Otto Schimek's symbolic grave at Machowa, Poland

Otto Schimek (May 5, 1925 – November 14, 1944) was an Austrian soldier in the German Wehrmacht during World War II who served as a member of a firing squad. He was himself executed, allegedly for refusing to carry out a death sentence on Poles, making him a symbol of pacifism and Austrian resistance to Nazism. The truthfulness of the story has been disputed, with critics arguing that the story is not based on any reliable documents and is a fabrication.

== Early life ==
Otto Schimek was born in Vienna, the thirteenth child of Rudolph and Maria (née Zsambeck). The family had fallen into hard times during the Great Depression, and was further pushed into poverty by the death of Rudolph Schimek, who had been the primary breadwinner, in 1932. After his father's death, Otto neglected his school duties in favor of helping his mother, a dressmaker, bring enough money in to feed the large family.

According to his sister, Elfrida Kujak, Otto was not particularly religious as a child. However, he would go to church every Sunday with his mother. Later, after being drafted to the Wehrmacht, he carried a cross with him at all times. His work with his mother consumed most of his time, and he did not have too many friends. However, the family's neighbors spoke highly of him, and on the way to the army unit, he was allegedly bid farewell by the whole condominium located on Obere Augartenstrasse.

== Wehrmacht duties ==
Schimek was seventeen years old when he was drafted. He initially served in Bosnia, and was later moved to southern Poland. As Elfrida Kujak stated after the war, while on leave some time in 1943 or early 1944, Otto told her that he did not want to kill anybody, and that he would raise his gun above the heads of enemies. "My conscience is clear" - Schimek allegedly said. "I will not shoot people. These people want to return home just like me. This war is not Christian."

This behavior was swiftly noted by the Army authorities. Schimek was warned, and then put in prison. He managed to escape and tried to return to Vienna, but was caught somewhere in Czechoslovakia. Severely beaten, Otto faced court martial for desertion, but was given a final chance.

=== Firing squad ===
Wehrmacht authorities decided that Schimek would be included in a firing squad. His task was to kill a Polish family from the area between Tarnów and Dębica - a father, mother and two sons, who had been caught preparing food for soldiers of the Home Army. Otto firmly refused, stating that he would not kill innocent people in Hitler's war. His superiors' reaction was quick, and Schimek was immediately sentenced to death for cowardice and desertion.

Elfrida Kujak later said that when news about the sentence reached his family, Otto's mother wrote a letter to Berlin, pleading for clemency. It was too late. A few hours before the execution, Schimek wrote a letter to his brother, stating: "I am in a happy mood. What do we have to lose? Nothing, only our poor lives, as they cannot kill our souls. What a hope! Today, I am going to heaven, where the Father is waiting. May God guard you so that you will join me".

== Death ==
Schimek was executed on the morning of November 14, 1944. The exact location of his execution is unknown. It has only been established that it took place in the village of Lipiny, southeast of Tarnów. Afterwards, the locals were reportedly allowed to pick up his body. He was reportedly buried in the cemetery in the village of Machowa, located halfway between Tarnów and Dębica. An exhumation carried out in the 1990s proved that the man buried in his alleged grave was actually much older at the time of death. It is now believed that Schimek was actually buried alongside other Wehrmacht soldiers at the war cemetery in Łęki Dolne.

== The tomb ==
Some regard Schimek's symbolic tomb in Machowa as an object of pilgrimage. A nearby tablet reads "Born in 1925, executed in 1944, because he did not want to shoot the Poles. May God take you in his mercy". Many people visit the grave to lay flowers and light candles in his memory. Polish and Austrian flags can also be seen on it.

These visits became controversial in the late 1980s, when the anarcho-pacifist organization "Wolność i Pokój" (Freedom and Peace, WiP), on November 17, 1985, used the anniversary of Schimek's death to announce their "Declaration of Principles". WiP activists were stopped on their way to the cemetery. Communist militia in Tarnów detained fourteen of them for several hours. On May 4, 1986, a march to Schimek's grave to commemorate his birth resulted in the detention of fifty activists.

In 1993, Telewizja Polska (Polish Television) made a 40-minute documentary movie entitled Casus: Otto Schimek.

== Controversy ==
A 2013 article in the Polish magazine Wprost, drawing on the findings of Austrian journalist Martin Pollack and writer Christoph Ransmayr, disputes most facts forming the core of Schimek's story. It notes that there are no documents confirming the story, or witnesses outside of second-hand testimony of Schimek's sister, Elfrida Kujak.

== See also ==
- August Landmesser
- Josef Schultz
