= 1993 Polish speedway season =

Motorcycle racing competition

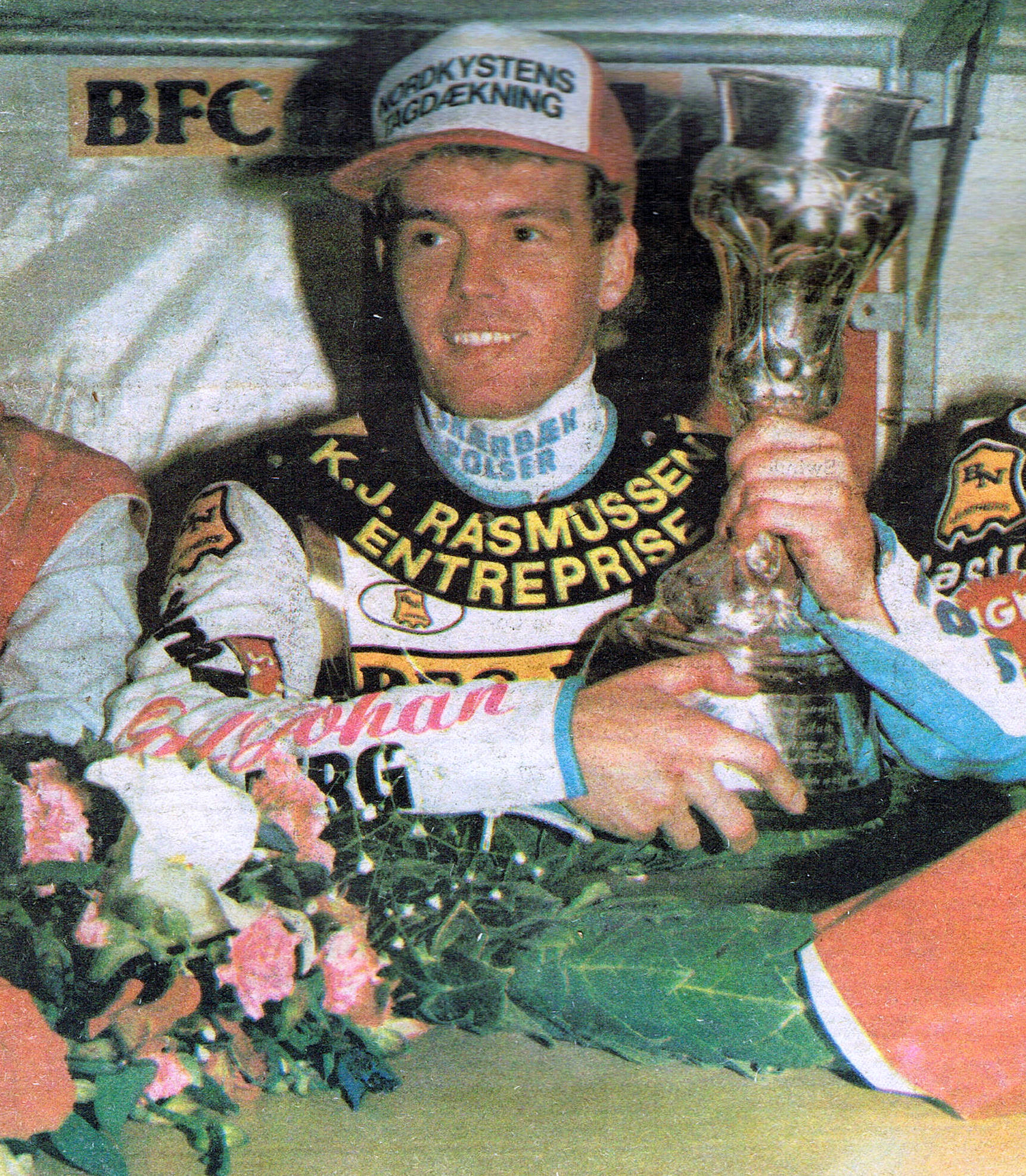
- Denmark's Tommy Knudsen helped WTS Wrocław win the gold medal

The 1993 Polish Speedway season was the 1993 season of motorcycle speedway in Poland.

== Individual ==
=== Polish Individual Speedway Championship ===
The 1993 Individual Speedway Polish Championship final was held on 19 September at Bydgoszcz. Tomasz Gollob won the Polish Championship for the second consecutive season.

Pos.	Rider	Club	Total	Points
1	Tomasz Gollob	Bydgoszcz	15	(3,3,3,3,3)
2	Tomasz Świątkiewicz	Toruń	12	(1,3,2,3,3)
3	Piotr Świst	Gorzów Wlkp	11	(1,2,3,2,3)
4	Jarosław Olszewski	Gdańsk	9	(3,2,3,1,0)
5	Jerzy Mordel	Lublin	9	(3,1,2,0,3)
6	Piotr Baron	Wrocław	9	(2,2,0,3,2)
7	Tomasz Bajerski	Toruń	9	(1,1,3,2,2)
8	Georgi Petranow	Rzeszów	8	(1,2,2,1,2)
9	Roman Jankowski	Leszno	7	(3,3,0,0,1)
10	Dariusz Śledź	Wrocław	7	(0,3,1,1,2)
11	Robert Sawina	Toruń	6	(0,1,1,3,1)
12	Dariusz Stenka	Lublin	5	(2,d,1,1,1)
13	Dariusz Fliegert	Rybnik	5	(2,0,0,2,1)
14	Sławomir Dudek	Zielona Góra	5	(2,1,0,2,0)
15	Piotr Paluch	Gorzów Wlkp	2	(0,w,2,0,0)
16	Robert Kempiński	Grudziądz	1	(0,d,1,0,0)
17	Henryk Bem (res)	Rybnik	ns	
18	Krzysztof Okupski (res)	Piła	ns	

=== Golden Helmet ===
The 1993 Golden Golden Helmet (Polish: Turniej o Złoty Kask, ZK) organised by the Polish Motor Union (PZM) was the 1993 event for the league's leading riders. The final was held at Wrocław on the 30 October. Dariusz Śledź won the Golden Helmet.

Pos.	Rider	Club	Total	Points
1	Dariusz Śledź	Wrocław	12 +3	(3,3,2,1,3)
2	Jerzy Mordel	Lublin	12 +2	(w,3,3,3,3)
3	Jan Krzystyniak	Rzeszów	12 +1	(2,2,3,3,2)
4	Marek Kępa	Bydgoszcz	11	(3,1,3,2,2)
5	Andrzej Huszcza	Zielona Góra	11	(2,3,2,3,1)
6	Wojciech Załuski	Wrocław	8	(3,0,3,0,2)
7	Jacek Krzyżaniak	Toruń	8	(0,3,2,2,1)
8	Piotr Świst	Gorzów Wlkp.	7	(3,2,1,1,0)
9	Roman Jankowski	Leszno	7	(1,2,1,2,1)
10	Tomasz Bajerski	Toruń	6	(1,2,0,0,3)
11	Mirosław Cierniak	Tarnów	6	(2,0,0,3,1)
12	Jacek Rempała	Tarnów	6	(1,0,2,1,2)
13	Tomasz Świątkiewicz	Toruń	5	(1,1,1,2,0)
14	Georgi Petranow	Rzeszów	4	(0,1,0,0,3)
15	Adam Łabędzki	Leszno	4	(2,1,d,0,1)
16	Marek Garsztka	Ostrów Wlkp.	1	(0,0,1,0,0)
17	Zenon Kasprzak (res)	Leszno	ns	
18	Krzysztof Jankowski (res)	Wrocław	ns	

=== Junior Championship ===
- winner - Tomasz Bajerski

=== Silver Helmet ===
- winner - Tomasz Kruk

=== Bronze Helmet ===
- winner - Piotr Baron

== Pairs ==
=== Polish Pairs Speedway Championship ===
The 1993 Polish Pairs Speedway Championship was the 1993 edition of the Polish Pairs Speedway Championship. The final was held on 1 May at Grudziądz.

Pos	Team	Pts	Riders
1	Polonia Bydgoszcz	23	Tomasz Gollob 16, Eugeniusz Skupień 7, Jacek Gollob 0
2	Zielona Góra	21	Andrzej Huszcza 16, Piotr Protasiewicz 5, Artur Pawlak 0
3	Apator Toruń	20	Mirosław Kowalik 0, Krzysztof Kuczwalski 8, Jacek Krzyżaniak 12
4	Stal Gorzów Wlkp.	19	Piotr Świst 11, Marek Hućko 7, Ryszard Franczyszyn 1
5	Unia Leszno	18	Roman Jankowski 9, Zenon Kasprzak 3, Zbigniew Krakowski 6
6	GKM Grudziądz	15	Zdzisław Rutecki 6, Robert Kempiński 7, Jarosław Skarżyński 2
7	Kolejarz Opole	4	Karol Lis 2, Roland Wieczorek 0, Mirosław Sosna 2

== Team ==
=== Team Speedway Polish Championship ===
The 1993 Team Speedway Polish Championship was the 1993 edition of the Team Polish Championship. WTS Wrocław won the gold medal. Their team included riders such as Tommy Knudsen, Dariusz Śledź and Piotr Baron.

==== First Division ====
Pos	Team	Pts	W	D	L	Diff
1	WTS Sparta Wrocław	28	14	0	4	+191
2	Polonia Bydgoszcz	22	11	0	7	+148
3	Apator Toruń	22	11	0	7	+118
4	Stal Gorzów	20	10	0	8	+62
5	Motor Lublin	18	9	0	9	+5
6	Zielona Góra	18	9	0	9	–66
7	Unia Leszno	14	7	0	11	–74
8	Unia Tarnów	14	7	0	11	–84
9	ROW Rybnik	12	6	0	12	–137
10	Stal Rzeszów	12	6	0	12	–163

==== Second Division ====
Pos	Team	Pts	W	D	L	Diff
1	Wybrzeże Gdańsk	29	14	1	3	+339
2	Włókniarz Częstochowa	28	14	0	4	+111
3	Polonia Piła	23	11	1	6	+21
4	GKM Grudziądz	22	10	2	6	+76
5	Start Gniezno	22	11	0	7	+74
6	Ostrów	18	9	0	9	–43
7	Wanda Kraków	14	7	0	11	–27
8	KKŻ Krosno	12	6	0	12	–71
9	Kolejarz Opole	12	5	2	11	–102
10	Śląsk Świętochłowice	0	0	0	18	–378
11	Victoria Rolnicki Machowa	withdrew				
