= Schweber =

Schweber is a surname. Notable people with the surname include:

- Samuel Schweber (1936–2017), Argentine chess player
- Silvan S. Schweber (1928–2017), French-born American theoretical physicist and science historian
- Simone Schweber, Goodman Professor of Education and Jewish Studies at the University of Wisconsin–Madison
