= Josef Schulz =

German WWII soldier (1909/1910–1941)

Josef Schulz (1909/1910 – 20 July 1941), also spelled Joseph Schultz, was a German soldier of the 714th Infantry Division stationed in German-occupied Serbia during World War II. He died in 1941, allegedly executed after refusing to take part in an execution of partisans. The German High Command recorded him as killed in action. The plot of the Yugoslav short film Joseph Schultz (1973) is based on the incident. Based on a study of records from the German Bundesarchiv, the incident was dismissed as a legend by many scholars in the 1990s.

== Life ==
Josef Schulz was a German soldier. He was born in 1909 and lived in Barmen, Wuppertal, Germany. During World War II, he served as a corporal in the 714th Infantry Division of the Wehrmacht. He is officially recorded as having died during operations in Yugoslavia on 19 July 1941.

== Partisans' execution incident ==
On 20 July 1941, a Wehrmacht firing squad executed sixteen Yugoslav partisans within the barracks of Smederevska Palanka, southeast of Belgrade.

When the bodies of the victims were exhumed after the war, an eyewitness recalls that remains of military equipment ascribed to a German soldier were also recovered, while an identification tag got lost. In 1947, when a memorial was erected for the victims, the name of a Croat victim with a German-sounding first name, Marsel Mezic, was rendered to Marcel Masel to reflect the belief that a German soldier was executed along with the partisans for refusing to take part in the executions.

Picture showing an execution of Yugoslav partisans on 20 July 1941. The identification of the person without helmet as Josef Schulz is disputed.

In 1961 and 1966, West German weeklies Neue Illustrierte and Quick published photographs dated to 20 July 1941, showing an execution and, probably, a German soldier without helmet and belt walking toward the line of the victims. The German public was asked to identify this person. The photographs were shot by Wehrmacht units, developed by a Palanka local, and left behind when the unit was relocated to the Eastern Front. The Palanka chronicle also published the photographs but without mentioning the defection of a German.

In response to the German weeklies' appeal, West German Bundestag member Wilderich Freiherr Ostman von der Leye identified the person on the photographs as Josef Schulz. He based his identification on the diary of Friedrich Stahl, commander of the 714th infantry division, which was made available to him by the Bundesarchiv's Military Archive in Freiburg, then headed by Stahl's son. On Ostman's initiative, Josef's brother Walter Schulz travelled to Yugoslavia in 1972 and confirmed that the person in question was Josef Schulz. In 1973, a journalist from the Yugoslav paper Politika visited Walter Schulz in Germany; afterwards, Yugoslav newspapers reported that Josef Schulz had been a capable artist and a member of an underground opposition to Hitler. Zvonimr Janković, a Yugoslav eyewitness, confirmed that he had seen a German officer arguing furiously with a German without insignia on his uniform.

In contrast, some of Josef Schulz's former Wehrmacht comrades said that the person on the photographs was not Schulz. A 1972 report of the Central Office of the State Justice Administration for the Investigation of National Socialist Crimes in Ludwigsburg, Germany, also rejected the person's identification as Schulz. Studies conducted by the staff of the Ludwigsburg office and the Freiburg Military Archive conclude that Josef Schulz was killed already on 19 July 1941, during an engagement with partisans, and that he was reported dead to the army command on 20 July 2:00 AM, with a respective notice sent to the relatives subsequently. Many scholars have since dismissed Schulz's alleged role in the incident on 20 July as a legend.

Schulz nevertheless remained a popular figure in Yugoslavia despite protests from a veteran partisan organization. In the early 1980s, a second memorial was erected at the execution site in Palanka, where Schulz's name was added to those of the sixteen Yugoslav victims; the name of Marsel Mezic appears in its proper spelling. While the Schulz legend is not as popular in Germany, West German ambassadors Horst Grabert and Wilfried Gruber attended ceremonies in Palanka in 1981 and 1997, respectively.

== Movie ==
In 1973, Yugoslav Zastava Films released the short movie Joseph Schultz. The plot is based on Schultz's refusal to execute Yugoslav partisans and his eventual execution by the firing squad he was assigned to. The 13-minute-long 16 mm sound and color movie was directed by Danko Popović and Predrag Golubović. Original sepia photographs were combined with a re-enactment of the incident. In Canada and the United States, the movie was distributed by Wombat Productions, New York City.

The movie was recommended as a resource for teaching by the US-based Educational Film Library Association (EFLA) and by a Torah Aura Productions teachers' guide, Teaching the Holocaust.

== See also ==
- Otto Schimek
