= NJPS =

NJPS may refer to:

- National Jewish Population Survey
- New Jewish Publication Society of America Version
