= Proactive conversion =

Jewish outreach to non-Jews

Proactive conversion is a term used to refer to measures by various promoters of Judaism to provide outreach to non-Jews. It is distinguished from proselytizing, or active attempts of persuasion and solicitation toward conversion, but it is distinguished from the traditional rabbinical policies regarding prospective proselytes (i.e., rejection of inquirees' requests three times before acceptance) in that programs for conversion are opened to first-time inquiries.

== Ancient Judaic proselytization ==
According to Sue Fishkoff, Judaism was openly proselytized both inside and outside of Judea in ancient times, with the population of Jews eventually coming to total at least 8 million people, or 10 percent of the population of the Roman Empire, by the first century CE. This large population was curtailed by Roman prohibitions on the Judeans and their religion due to frequent attempts at secession, and the prohibitions set in place were further aggravated by the rise of Christianity as a state religion, which resulted in declaring conversion to Judaism as a capital offense in 407 CE.

== Modern era ==
The term was popularized by Gary A. Tobin (1949–2009) of the Institute for Jewish & Community Research in San Francisco, who championed a more open religious approach to converts and prospects and established a number of initiatives towards that end. His purpose was to "for a greater ethnic and racial diversity among Jews" and considered the conversion of more people to Judaism a "great mitzvah".

One of the first individuals to openly advocate for proactive conversion, however, was Leo Baeck, who spoke in favor of a "missionary center" for the training of Reform rabbis to openly seek for prospective converts during a 1949 address to the World Union for Progressive Judaism. In 1978, Alexander Schindler urged Reform rabbis of the Union of American Hebrew Congregations to begin offering Judaism to "unchurched" gentiles who are not specifically attached to a Christian denomination; he repeated this call in 1994, and the Union's outreach department finally established "A Taste of Judaism," which would offer a preliminary view of Judaism for first-time prospectives.

A similar program operated by Conservative Jews, the Miller Introduction to Judaism Program, has been operated in 1986 at the American Jewish University in Los Angeles. In 1997, Conservative rabbi Harold Schulweis created a Keruv ('outreach') Center in Encino, California; "Turning potential converts away by telling them the Noahide Laws are good enough for them, whereas Judaism's treasures are to be saved for an elite few, is, Schulweis argues, promulgating a particularist notion of Judaism that is profoundly un-Jewish."

== Criticism ==
Jewish organizations have had mixed responses to the idea of proactive conversion. Traditionally, unofficial policy has focused on providing services and transmitting religious identity to other Jews, not seeking converts. Ephraim Buchwald argues that the focus should be on revitalizing Jewish spirituality in Jewish youth, rather than trying to gain converts. He likens it to throwing a lifeboat to those floating on the water (prospective converts), while disengaged Jewish youth are drowning.

== Bibliography ==
- Tobin, Gary A. Opening the Gates: How Proactive Conversion Can Revitalize the Jewish Community (ISBN 0787908819) Jossey-Bass. 1999.
