= Jaworze Górne =

- Village
- Location within Poland
- Coordinates: 49°55′N 21°20′E
- Country: Poland
- Voivodeship: Subcarpathian
- County: Dębica
- Gmina: Pilzno

Jaworze Górne [jaˈvɔʐɛ ˈɡurnɛ] is a village in the administrative district of Gmina Pilzno, within Dębica County, Subcarpathian Voivodeship, in south-eastern Poland. It lies on the left bank of the Wisłoka River within the boundaries of the Ciężkowice Foothills Protected Landscape Area . It has the status of a village council .
