= Połomia, Dębica County =

Połomia
- Village
- Location within Poland
- Coordinates: 49°58′42″N 21°21′0″E
- Country: Poland
- Voivodeship: Subcarpathian
- County: Dębica
- Gmina: Pilzno
- Elevation: 210 m (690 ft)
- Population: 78

Połomia [pɔˈwɔmja] is a village in the administrative district of Gmina Pilzno, within Dębica County, Subcarpathian Voivodeship, in south-eastern Poland.
