= Bielowy =

- Village
- Location within Poland
- Coordinates: 49°56′N 21°20′E
- Country: Poland
- Voivodeship: Subcarpathian
- County: Dębica
- Gmina: Pilzno
- Website: http://bielowy.pl

Bielowy [bjɛˈlɔvɨ] is a village in the administrative district of Gmina Pilzno, within Dębica County, Subcarpathian Voivodeship, in south-eastern Poland.
