= Mokrzec, Podkarpackie Voivodeship =

Mokrzec
- Village
- Location within Poland
- Coordinates: 49°58′N 21°19′E
- Country: Poland
- Voivodeship: Subcarpathian
- County: Dębica
- Gmina: Pilzno
- Time zone: UTC+1 (CET)
  - Summer (DST): UTC+2 (CEST)
- Vehicle registration: RDE

Mokrzec [ˈmɔkʂɛt͡s] is a village in the administrative district of Gmina Pilzno, within Dębica County, Subcarpathian Voivodeship, in south-eastern Poland.

Five Polish citizens were murdered by Nazi Germany in the village during World War II.
