= Jaworze Dolne =

- Village
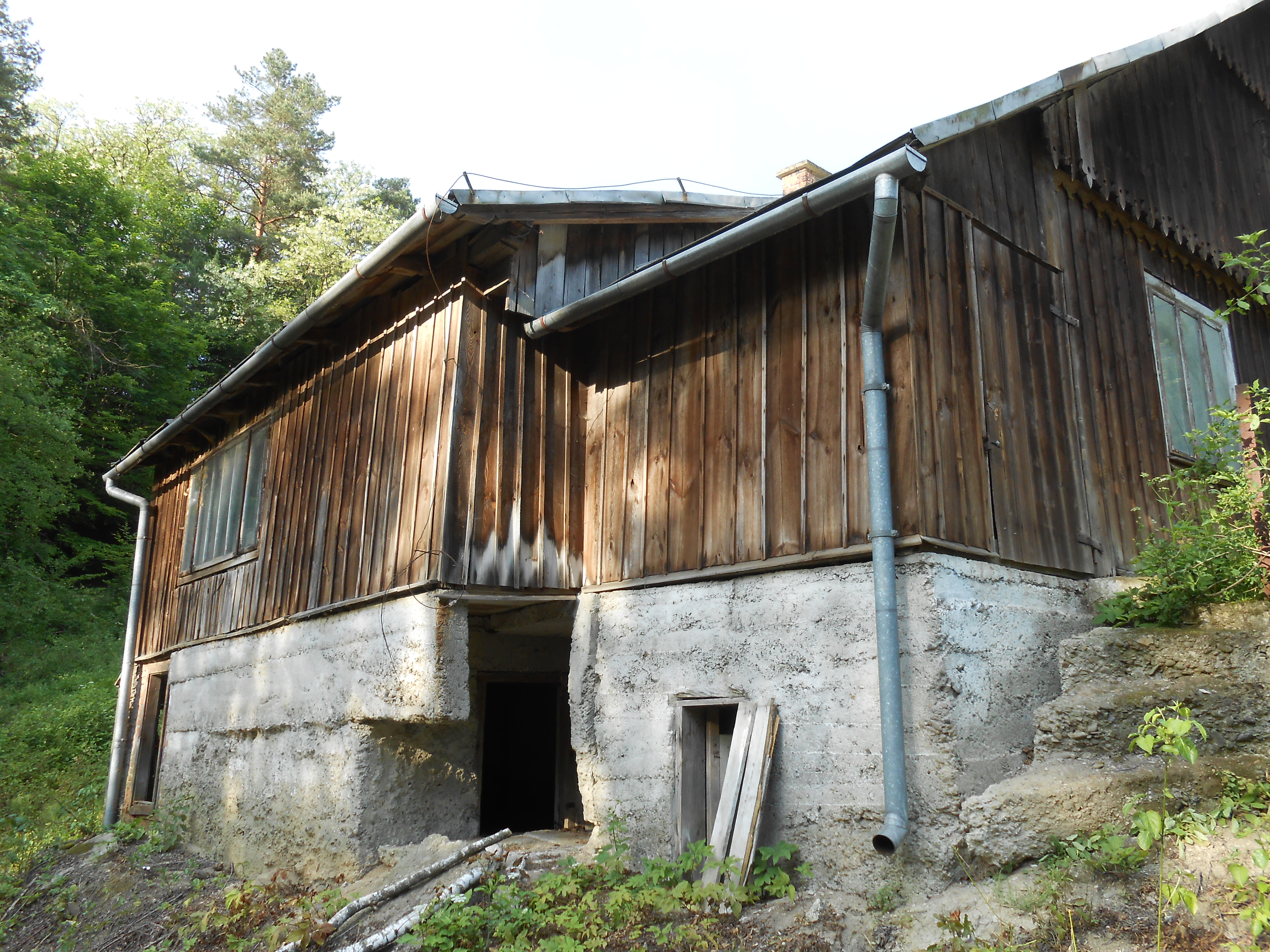
- Old mill in Jaworze Dolne

- Location within Poland
- Coordinates: 49°57′N 21°21′E
- Country: Poland
- Voivodeship: Subcarpathian
- County: Dębica
- Gmina: Pilzno
- Vehicle registration: RDE

Jaworze Dolne [jaˈvɔʐɛ ˈdɔlnɛ] is a village in the administrative district of Gmina Pilzno, within Dębica County, Subcarpathian Voivodeship, in south-eastern Poland.

== History ==
Following the joint German-Soviet invasion of Poland, which started World War II in September 1939, the village was occupied by Germany. On February 4, 1943, German troops and Gestapo perpetrated a massacre of 11 people in Jaworze Dolne. The victims were five Poles and six Jews, whom they sheltered from the Holocaust.
