= Danko Popović =

Serbian writer (1928–2009)

- Born: Slobodan Popović; 19 August 1928; Aranđelovac, Kingdom of Serbs, Croats and Slovenes
- Died: 7 August 2009 (aged 80); Belgrade, Serbia
- Resting place: Saint Archangel Gabriel Church, Bukovik
- Education: University of Belgrade
- Occupations: Writer and playwright
- Writing career
- Language: Serbian
- Notable work: The Book About Milutin

Slobodan Popović (Serbian Cyrillic: Слободан Слобо Поповић; 19 August 1928 – 7 August 2009) (19. August 2009), was a Serbian lawyer, screenplaywriter and archivist from 1953 to 2006 at Serbian State Archives Of Yugoslavia.

== Way Of Life ==
Popović completed his education with a Serbian Doctor Of Law graduation at University of Belgrade's Law School, On vacation, he always returned regularly to his birth town and Property Of Heart and Soul near Bukulja.

== Work (selection) ==
Prose (selection)

- Svečanosti, (Celebrities), Nolit, Belgrade 1962.
- Kukurek i kost, Slovo ljubve, Belgrade 1976.
- Čarapići, Nolit, Belgrade 1969.
- Oficiri, Minerva, Subotica 1979.
- Knjiga o Milutinu, Publishing series Biblioteka Književne novine, Belgrade 1985.
- Konak u Kragujevcu, Publishing series Biblioteka Književne novine, Belgrade 1988, ISBN 86-391-0121-3.
- Blood Blossoms of Kosovo: Chronicle About the Serbian Holy Land, edited by Sofija Škorić, translated by Ralph Bogert, Serbian Literary Company, Toronto 1997, ISBN 0-9682484-1-1.
- Četiri vetra - pisma prijatelju u Torontu, Prometej and Jefimija, Novi Sad and Kragujevac 2004, ISBN 86-7639-748-1.
- The Book About Milutin, translated by Svetlana Milošević, Knjiga komerc, Belgrade 2018, ISBN 978-86-7712-437-3.

Filmography (selection)

- Pukovnikovica (Colonel's Wife), screenplay, Studio Film danas 1972.
- Josef Šulc (Joseph Schultz; Leading Actor: Faruk Begolli), short film, co-author, Zastava Film 1973.
- Karađorđeva smrt, TVB 1984.
