= The Book About Milutin =

Novel by Danko Popović

The Book About Milutin (Serbian: Књига о Милутину / Knjiga o Milutinu) is a novel by the Serbian writer Danko Popović. The novel is about Milutin, a Serbian peasant and former soldier who tells his story from jail after World War I. He talks to an imaginary listener about the tragic fate of the Serbian people, his family and Serbia. The book was published in 1985.

== Content ==
Milutin Ostojić, a Serbian peasant and a martyr from some Šumadija village was a real person. The book shows a true face of village and peasant, it discovers a source of true moral sensitivity in a peasant and martyr (Milutin), his sense for justice, his spirit which follows an original approach to life. Milutin's spirit shows that a life that follows strong a sense of human dignity is not an invention of moralists.

Milutin is a Šumadijan farmer, a World War I Thessaloniki Front infantry soldier. His father was killed in the Serbo-Bulgarian War, his two brothers died in the Balkan Wars. As a war hero he returns home in order to experience maltreatment by the tax officials of the state he defended and in the creation of which he participated. In the war and after it, he learned what a human not obeying the law and the customs could and must do. Fighting for his country and its freedom in his youth, Milutin was not able to predict what he might expect in his old age. His son was recruited and sent on Srem Front in 1944 as a teenager. Milutin protested by offering himself as a replacement for his son. He asked why young men, still children, inexperienced in fighting at a war, should be sent to the front. As a replacement he volunteers to go to the front himself and is ridiculed by his wife Zivana. The news about their only son's death leaves Milutin and Zivana petrified. After the end if World War II, Milutin was arrested innocently in the time of the "grain redemption", thrown into jail and maltreated by a gang of criminals and nobodies.

== Perception of the book by historians ==
Historian J. Dragović-Soso wrote:

Milutin's common sense and his naivete provide the vehicle through which the main events of the first half of the 20eth century are apprehended, and his commentary on the creation of the common Yugoslav state, the corruption and disunity of that state, the resurgence of war in 1941 and the immorality of the new communist authorities, illuminates the absurdity of the struggle and sacrifices of the Serbian people

Milutin noticed that the Slav brothers did not rise up, they did not experience the same as us, they lived and cooperated with Serbian enemies, and look upon their 'liberators' Serbs with a haughty disdain.

While Dragović-Soso is willing to represent the Serbs' doubts in their unity with Slav brothers and the meaning of that brotherhood, the price they paid and they are paying for that unity and brotherhood without her opinion about the same, the others are willing to interpret the Serbs existential questions "little more than a pretext on which to string a litany of complaints and questions, most of which have to do with Serbia's alleged tendencies to sacrifice its own interest for the sake of others."

The Book About Milutin was a mega-bestseller in Serbia and is widely seen as nourishing the nationalist Serb debate set in the second half of the 1980s.

== Sources ==
- Knjiga o Milutinu - trebnik etičnosti by Miroslav Eregić chapter in Knjiga o Milutinu by Danko Popović, L'age d'home Belgrade 2000
