= Victoria Rolnicki Machowa =

Polish motorcycle speedway club, 1992–1993

- Nickname: Jastrzębie (Hawks)
- Founded: 1992
- Disbanded: 1993
- Based in: Pilzno
- Location: Poland
- Stadium: Speedway Stadium in Machowa
- Colors: pink, white and blue
- Owner: Piotr Rolnicki

Victoria Rolnicki Machowa was a Polish motorcycle speedway club from Machowa. It was the first private speedway club in Poland. The founder and owner of the club was Piotr Rolnicki. The team operated from 1992 to 1993.

During its existence, the club participated twice in the second-tier speedway league. In the 1992 season, it secured 7th place, but in the 1993 season, it was withdrawn from the league after four rounds and subsequently dissolved. Despite plans for its reactivation, these never materialized, and Victoria never returned to any competitions.

== History ==
=== Origins and founding of the club ===
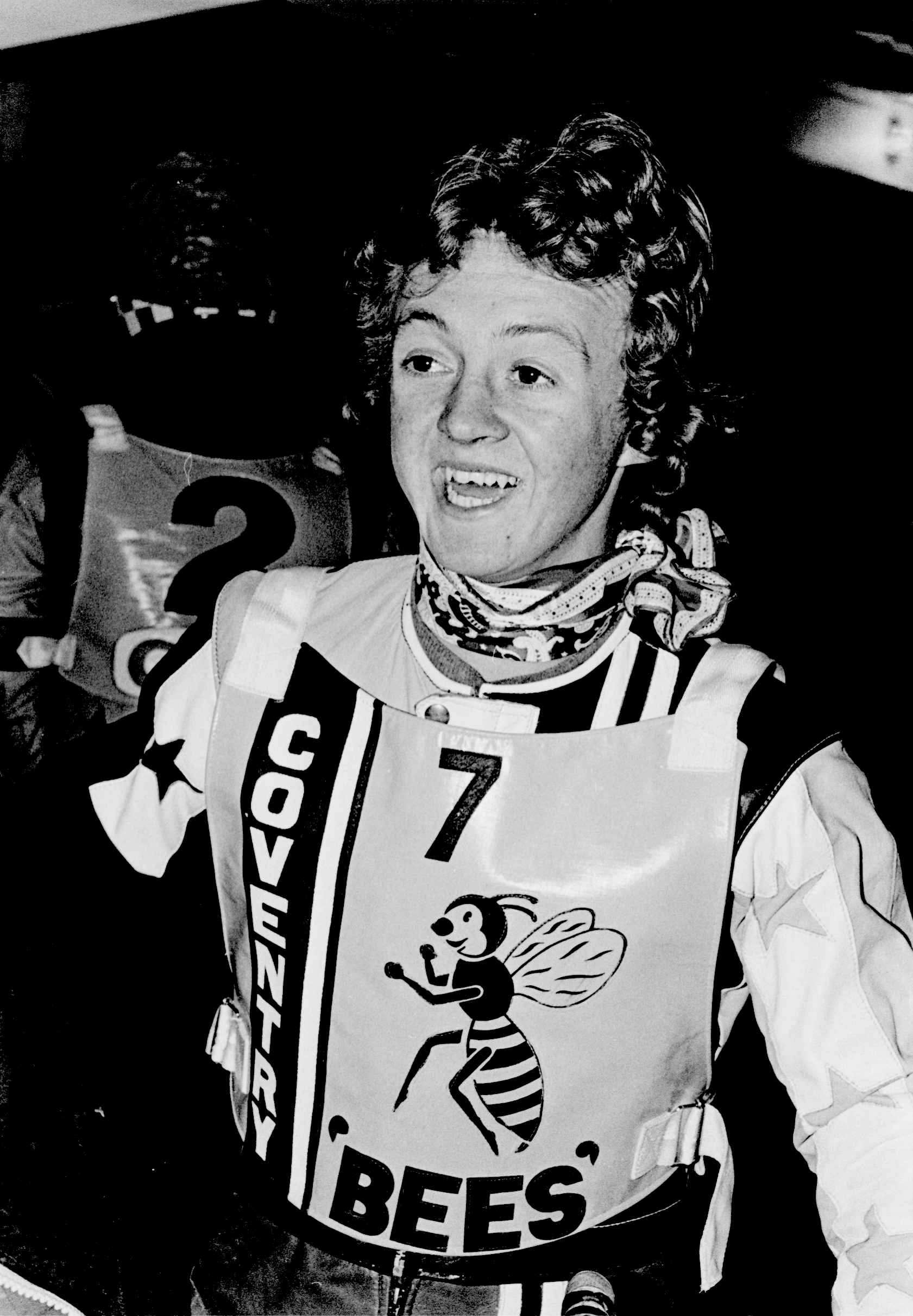
Mitch Shirra was one of the riders who transferred to the newly established club in Machowa from the Unia Tarnów team

Before 1992, Piotr Rolnicki was a sponsor of Unia Tarnów. In the 1991 season, the Tarnów club added "Rolnicki" to its historical name, competing in the then top-tier league as Unia–Rolnicki Tarnów. This was the first time in Unia's history that a sponsor's name was included in the club's title. After the 1991 season, a conflict arose between Piotr Rolnicki and the management of Unia Tarnów. The disagreement stemmed from differing visions regarding the future of the speedway section within the Tarnów club. Initial reports of this conflict surfaced in January 1992. Ultimately, the two parties failed to reach an agreement, leading Piotr Rolnicki to withdraw his sponsorship of Unia Tarnów and decide to establish his own speedway club.

Initially, Rolnicki planned to create the new club in Tarnów. To achieve this, he negotiated with several sports clubs in Tarnów to secure the use of their stadiums. He aimed to modernize and adapt the Tamel Tarnów Stadium or the Błękitni Tarnów facility to meet the requirements for hosting speedway competitions. However, after failing to reach agreements with the managers of these venues, Rolnicki chose to establish the club in his hometown of Machowa. He also decided to construct a new speedway stadium on a plot of land he owned there.

=== 1992 season debut ===
Construction of the stadium in Machowa began between February and March 1992, as soon as the snow and frost subsided. The facility was opened in May of the same year after less than three months of construction. Rolnicki hired several individuals previously associated with Unia Tarnów during the previous season, including coach Stanisław Kępowicz, three mechanics, and a number of officials and club staff. The team roster for Victoria included Polish riders Sławomir Tronina, Andrzej Bykiewicz, Grzegorz Rempała, and Piotr Zięba, as well as international competitors such as New Zealander Mitch Shirra and Briton Jeremy Doncaster. Additionally, Piotr Styczyński, who had competed for Unia Tarnów from 1987 to 1990, and junior rider Paweł Jachym, on loan from Tarnów, joined the squad. The team also featured Australians Troy Butler and Shane Parker, Polish seniors Dariusz Bieda and Dariusz Rachwalik, and junior Jarosław Nowak, who was on loan.

Before the league season, Victoria played several friendly matches, including one against KKŻ Krosno (a 61:29 victory) and a triangular meet with the first and second squads of Włókniarz Częstochowa. Due to the incomplete construction of the Machowa stadium, Victoria hosted its early matches at other venues until its official opening in May 1992.

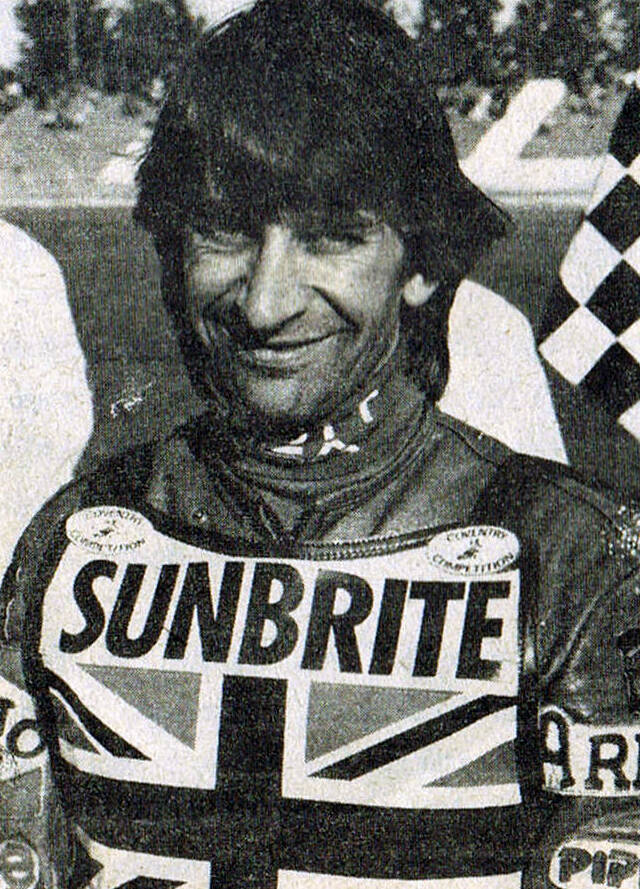
Jeremy Doncaster scored the most points in Victoria's league debut

On 29 March, Victoria made its league debut in the second division, facing WTS Sparta Wrocław's reserve team. The match, held at the MOSiR Stadium in Lublin, ended with Victoria claiming a decisive 59:31 victory.

On 2 April, in the preliminary round of the Polish Team Speedway Cup, Victoria faced Unia Leszno as the host team at the MOSiR Stadium in Lublin. The match concluded with a 54:36 win for Leszno.

On 5 April, in their first away league match, Victoria competed against GKM Grudziądz. Despite winning the final heat 4:2, Victoria narrowly lost the match 46:44.

The scheduled 9 April rematch in the preliminary round of the Polish Team Speedway Cup did not take place, as the Machowa team failed to travel to Leszno, forfeiting the match with a 0:40 loss. The reason for this decision was Victoria's incomplete squad. As a result, the Machowa club was eliminated from further competition in the tournament.

On 20 April, in the third league round, Victoria hosted KS ROW Rybnik at the Krosno Speedway Stadium. The match ended in a 55:35 defeat for Victoria.

On 1 May, during the fourth league round, Victoria earned its first-ever league point by drawing 45:45 with TŻ Iskra Ostrów Wielkopolski in an away match.

On 14 May 1992, in the sixth league round, Victoria played its first match at the new Machowa Speedway Stadium against Polonia Piła. The match, open to spectators free of charge, drew significant interest, with attendance estimates ranging from several thousand to as many as 10,000. The high turnout caused traffic congestion on the nearby national road 4, and some fans watched the match from the pit area. Polonia narrowly won the match 45:44.

In the latter part of the 1992 league season, Victoria won the majority of its home matches by large margins, while the away matches were similarly marked by heavy losses. Only three times did the outcome reverse: on 28 June, in the 12th round, Start Gniezno won in Machowa 56:34; on 19 July, in the 14th round, Unia Leszno also won in Machowa 45:43; and on 26 July, in the 15th round, Victoria defeated Śląsk Świętochłowice 54:36 away.

The remaining league matches of the 1992 season followed this pattern – Victoria won at home against Kolejarz Opole (49:41), KKŻ Krosno (52:38), GKM Grudziądz (66:22), Iskra Ostrów Wielkopolski (68:22), and Śląsk Świętochłowice (61:29), but lost away to ROW Rybnik (22:68), Unia Leszno (25:65), Start Gniezno (22:68), Polonia Piła (38:52), Kolejarz Opole (31:58), KKŻ Krosno (24:65), and Sparta II Wrocław (33:57).

In total, during the 1992 league season, Victoria Machowa won 7 matches, drew 1, and lost 12. The club finished in 7th place in the second division.

=== 1993 season ===
Before the 1993 season, most of the players who had represented the club in the previous season left, as did the team's coach, Stanisław Kępowicz. However, the club's owner, Piotr Rolnicki, loaned five riders from Stal Rzeszów and added players such as Robert Przygódzki and Vladimír Kalina to the Machowa team.

Ultimately, Victoria Rolnicki Machowa was entered into the second division competition. In the first round, the team lost away to KKŻ Krosno 36:54. Due to the odd number of teams (11 teams in the second division in the 1993 season), Victoria had a bye in the second round. In the third series, again away, the team lost to Śląsk Świętochłowice 36:54, which turned out to be the only victory for Śląsk in the entire season. In the fourth round, Victoria lost at home to Wanda Kraków 33:57.

After playing three league matches in the 1993 season, Victoria Machowa withdrew from further participation in the competition. The reason for this decision was the club's and its owner's financial problems. Piotr Rolnicki, in announcing the withdrawal, promised that the club would soon return to league competition, but this never came to pass. After the club's withdrawal, all of its league results for the 1993 season were annulled. The club also withdrew from the Polish Team Speedway Cup, forfeiting both matches against Apator Toruń 0:40, and from the Polish Club Pairs Championship, not entering the semifinals, as well as from the Team Speedway Junior Polish Championship, not participating in the first round of the competition.

== Stadium ==
=== History ===
==== Period of Victoria's activity ====
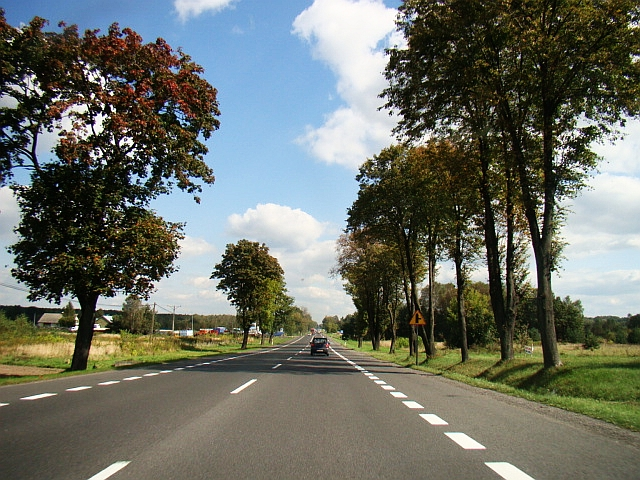
Section of national road 4 running through Machowa, near which the stadium was located

The speedway stadium in Machowa was built in 1992, and its construction took approximately three months. The seating consisted of low, earthen embankments around the track, with a truck trailer (capable of holding several dozen people) serving as the main stand, located along the starting straight. Technical buildings, such as changing rooms, restrooms, and the race office, were situated several hundred meters behind the stadium, on land owned by Piotr Rolnicki's company.

The first speedway match at the Machowa stadium took place on 14 May 1992, when Victoria played a second-division match against Polonia Piła. The official opening of the venue occurred on 31 May of the same year, during a second-division match between Victoria and Śląsk Świętochłowice. The owner of Victoria decided to offer free entry to spectators for the first match against Polonia Piła. This led to significant interest, with attendance estimates ranging from several hundred to even 10,000 people. As a result, a section of the nearby national road 4 was blocked for several kilometers, and some spectators watched the match from the pits.

==== After the club's collapse ====
After the dissolution of the Victoria Rolnicki Machowa club, the track was used sporadically. In 1993, it hosted a speedway license exam and the 1993 Silver Helmet Tournament (which was interrupted after the 18th race due to falling darkness).

Since then, the stadium was not used regularly. Occasionally, individual riders trained there, and summer camps were organized at the venue by Tarnów's youth speedway coach Bogusław Nowak. At the end of the 20th century, attempts were made to revive the track for regular use. In 1999, the semi-final of the 1999 Bronze Helmet Tournament and the final of the Polish qualifiers for the 1999 Individual Speedway Junior European Championship took place.

In 2003, a group of amateur speedway riders from Tarnów and Rzeszów started using the track, with the owner allowing them to use the venue free of charge. The last mentions of their use of the Machowa facility date back to 2008, after which the stadium began to deteriorate.

From then until 2013, the stadium was not in use. The track partially became overgrown with grass, and in some places, the wooden barriers around it were damaged. Ultimately, in the autumn of 2013, the facility was demolished and leveled.

=== Characteristics ===
The speedway track in Machowa was relatively short, measuring 285 meters, making it the shortest speedway track in Poland. The track's length placed high demands on the riders, making it particularly well-suited for training purposes. According to experts, it was significantly different from other tracks in the country, being a typically technical track that required riders to stay close to the curb (on the inside of the track). This often led to crashes. The facility was compared to the speedway track at the old Wembley Stadium.

== Achievements ==
=== League ===
Season	League competitions			Notes
Season	League		Place	Notes
1992	II	II League	7/11	
1993	II	II League	–	Club withdrew from the competition

League level	Number of seasons	Seasons
II	1	1992

=== Team Speedway Cup ===
Season	Round	Opponent	Home	Away	Result
1992	1st round	Unia Leszno	36–54	0–40	36–94
1993	1st round	Apator Toruń	0–40	0–40	0–80

=== Pair events ===
==== Polish Club Pairs Championship ====
Season	Round	Team	Place	Points
1992	Qualifiers	1. Sławomir Tronina; 2. Dariusz Rachwalik; 3. –	1	23
1992	Final	1. Piotr Styczyński; 2. Grzegorz Rempała; 3. Paweł Jachym	7	7

==== Polish Junior Club Pairs Championship ====
Season	Round	Team	Place	Points
1992	Qualifiers	1. Grzegorz Rempała; 2. Paweł Jachym; 3. Jarosław Nowak	1	23
1992	Final	1. Grzegorz Rempała; 2. Paweł Jachym; 3. –	6	14

=== Individual events ===
==== Polish Individual Championship ====
Season	Round	Rider	Place	Points
1992	Quarterfinals	Grzegorz Rempała	12	5
1992	Quarterfinals	Piotr Styczyński	16	1
1992	Quarterfinals	Paweł Jachym	13	4

==== Polish Junior Individual Championship ====
Season	Round	Rider	Place	Points
1992	Semifinal	Grzegorz Rempała	13	4
1992	Semifinal	Paweł Jachym	2	13
1992	Final	Paweł Jachym	13	4

==== Golden Helmet ====
Season	Round	Rider	Place	Points
1992	Qualifiers	Grzegorz Rempała	3	12
1992	Qualifiers	Paweł Jachym	4	11+3
1992	Qualifiers	Piotr Styczyński	5	11+2
1992	Qualifiers	Sławomir Tronina	–	3
1992	Qualifiers	Piotr Zięba	–	3
1992	Final	Paweł Jachym	13	4
1992	Final	Grzegorz Rempała	15	4

==== Silver Helmet ====
Season	Round	Rider	Place	Points
1992	Semifinal	Grzegorz Rempała	6	10
1992	Final	Grzegorz Rempała	12	4

==== Bronze Helmet ====
Season	Round	Rider	Place	Points
1992	Semifinal	Jarosław Nowak	7	7
1992	Semifinal	Paweł Jachym	–	5
1992	Final	Jarosław Nowak	10	5
