= Karađorđe's Death =

Карађорђева смрт Karađorđe's death
- Directed by: Đorđe Kadijević
- Written by: Danko Popović
- Starring: Aleksandar Berček; Marko Nikolić; Pavle Vuisić; Miodrag Radovanović; Gorica Popović
- Distributed by: RTS
- Release date: 1983
- Running time: 91 min.
- Country: SFR Yugoslavia
- Language: Serbo-Croatian

Karađorđe's death (Serbian: Карађорђева смрт / Karađorđeva smrt) is a 1983 Serbian history drama film, directed by Đorđe Kadijević. The film was written by Danko Popović.

== Cast ==
- Aleksandar Berček : Miloš Obrenović
- Marko Nikolić : Karađorđe
- Pavle Vuisić : Vujica Vulićević
- Miodrag Radovanović : Marashli Ali Pasha
- Gorica Popović : Ljubica Obrenović
- Bora Todorović : Naum Krnar
