= Lipiny, Podkarpackie Voivodeship =

Lipiny
- Village
- Location within Poland
- Coordinates: 50°0′45″N 21°17′1″E
- Country: Poland
- Voivodeship: Subcarpathian
- County: Dębica
- Gmina: Pilzno

Lipiny [liˈpinɨ] is a village in the administrative district of Gmina Pilzno, within Dębica County, Subcarpathian Voivodeship, in south-eastern Poland.
