= Sofija Škorić =

Serbian author and publisher (1937–2022)

- Born: 1 January 1937; Belgrade, Kingdom of Yugoslavia
- Died: 4 May 2022 (aged 85); Toronto, Ontario, Canada
- Occupations: Historian, academic and librarian

Sofija Škorić (Serbian Cyrillic: Софија Шкорић; 1 January 1937 – 4 May 2022) was a Serbian Canadian writer, editor, translator, publisher, activist and initiator-founder of The Serbian Heritage Academy of Canada, based in Toronto.

== Biography ==
She came to Canada at an early age to take her post-graduate degrees in library science and become one of the principal librarians at Robarts Library of the University of Toronto, retiring as librarian emerita.

Škorić concerned herself with three main fields of inquiry—the interrelations of philosophy and science, the philosophy of law, and the social and political problems of the Serbs. She edited some of the books of George Vid Tomashevich, Danko Popović, Meša Selimović, Dushan R. Kosovich, Vasa D. Mihailovich; wrote several comprehensive chapters in the East European Quarterly, Serbian Studies and other learned Slavic periodicals; and translated Epiphany by Matija Bećković, the poet laureate of Serbia. She also served as president of The North American Society for Serbian Studies, president of the Serbian-Canadian Unity Congress, and vice-president of the Serbian Unity Congress.

Škorić's eminence among her contemporary Serbian writers was not generally recognized until the appearance of the Serbs in Ontario, Serbian Academy After A Century: An Institution at Risk, Stress In the Vortex of Global Anomie, Dream and Shadows, A World As A Metaphor, The Bloodblossoms of Kosovo: A Chronicle About the Serbian Holy Land, Jewish Portraits in the Work of Ivo Andrić, and many other titles.

Her earlier work in publishing received recognition of the Canadian and Serbian governments alike and 2004 The Karić Brothers Award, but it was her determination to initiate and found the Serbian Heritage Academy of Canada which established her position in the front rank of the Serbian activists in Canada.

== The Serbian Heritage Academy ==
The Serbian Heritage Academy of Canada was founded in 1981, to act as a central cultural institution within the Serbian Diaspora in Canada. It collects, archives and offers to the public all available written materials from history and culture of the Serbian nation. The academy invites scholars, authors, and speakers on various subjects pertaining to Serbian society in general and culture in particular, in the past and present, and across all fields and disciplines.

Nikola Pašić and Škorić headed the organization from its founding until 1993. With her vision of an academy, Sofija Škorić aimed for a clearly defined goal: with the help of a close-meshed network of Serbian historians, scientists, professors, writers, poets, and artists, the problems and questions facing the Serbian nation in the Balkans should be examined from different perspectives and ultimately answered. The Serbian Heritage Academy in Toronto and Hamilton had a total of 14 chapters in fourteen cities in North America at the height of their activity. The guests of the academy were invited speakers in all the SHA chapters.

In 2017, Škorić, along with Serbian Heritage Academy president Žarko Brestovac, signed a cooperative agreement with the president of Matica srpska Dragan Stanić at the University of Toronto.

== Death ==
Škorić died on 4 May 2022, aged 85, in Toronto after a long battle with cancer. She was buried on 9 May 2022 at the cemetery of the Serbian Orthodox Holy Transfiguration Monastery in Milton.

== Works ==
- Serbs in Ontario (1987)
- The Serbian Academy after a century: an institution at risk? (1987)
- Serbia 1914-1918: A Gallant Ally (2014)

== Literature ==
- Škorić, S.; Tomashevich, G. V., eds. (1987). Serbs in Ontario – A Socio-Cultural Description. Toronto: Serbian Heritage Academy. ISBN 0-920069-06-1.
