= Gary Tobin =

Gary Tobin was a demographer and researcher on the Jewish community. Tobin's work focused on Jewish demographics, diversity, and philanthropy.

== Early life ==
Tobin was born in St. Louis, Missouri. He attended the University of California at Berkeley for an urban planning doctorate.

== Teaching ==
After finishing his graduate degree in 1974, Tobin returned to St. Louis to teach at Washington University. In 1982, Tobin turned from teaching to demography, studying the demographics of the St. Louis Jewish community. For the next 14 years, Tobin directed Brandeis University's Maurice and Marilyn Cohen Center for Modern Jewish Studies in Boston, Massachusetts.

== Research ==
In 1994 Tobin founded the Institute of Jewish & Community Research (IJCR). His wife Diane worked with him as graphic designer, editing and publishing IJCR's reports. Tobin was president of the IJCR, located in San Francisco, California. A 1998 article described the goals of the think tank as focusing on "Jewish philanthropy, synagogue life, and leadership development".

In 1995, Tobin explored reasons for Jewish donation and charity strategy in "American Jewish Philanthropy in the 1990s", a report he co-authored. The report suggested that specificity was key in soliciting donations, and that the idea of "Jewish continuity" in particular lacked support from donors.

In 1999, Tobin and Diane published a report titled "Study of Ethnic and Racial Diversity of the Jewish Population of the United States". The report relied on a questionnaire they sent to Jews of color. They later published it in book form as In Every Tongue: The Racial & Ethnic Diversity of the Jewish People.

In 1999, Tobin wrote the book "Opening the Gates: How Proactive Conversion Can Revitalize the Jewish Community". The book suggested that one way to navigate American Jewish demographic decline would be encouragement that non-Jewish spouses convert. He suggested that the campaign could bring in millions of new Jews, largely into the Reform, Conservative, or Reconstructionist denominations. Such a campaign would largely result in conversions not accepted by the Orthodox, a matter Tobin found unconcerning.

In Spring 2003, Tobin published a study on large donations from the wealthiest Jews in the United States between 1995 and 2000. The study evaluated 188 gifts of over $10 million made by 123 of these wealthy individuals. Tobin found that non-Jewish institutions received most of these donations. This occurred in part because Jewish groups and the federation system lacked the structure to take in this sort of large donation, suggested Tobin.

In 2005 the Tobins published "The Uncivil University", a report that said that anti-Israel and antisemitic sentiment had taken root within universities in the United States and that universities had violated public trust by allowing this climate to develop.

A 2005 study of Tobin's said that 10 percent of American Jews were black, Latino, Asian or mixed race.

== Personal life ==
Tobin met his wife Diane while speaking at a San Francisco conference. At the time, she was the JCCSF president and living in the city. A few years later, Tobin relocated to San Francisco to join Diane. They married in 1991 and had five children.

Tobin and his wife Diane adopted their son Jonah in 1997. The experience of raising their black son within the Jewish community led the Tobins to found the nonprofit Be'chol Lashon (Hebrew for "in every language") in 2000. The nonprofit aimed to celebrate Jewish ethnic and racial diversity through programs like a northern Californian Jewish summer camp for Jewish children of color. This was unusual, as most American Jewish institutions concentrated on Jews of European origin.

The Tobins were friendly with Capers Funnye, a black Chicago rabbi.

Tobin died on July 6, 2009, to cancer, leaving behind his wife, six children, and a grandson. He was in a hospital in Fort Lauderdale, Florida and was age 59.

== Views ==
Tobin advocated for an open form of Jewish relational and institutional life. He criticized mainstream institutions for what he saw as a gloomy, alarmist insularity. His research findings convinced him that mainstream Jewish pessimism was turning away Jewish community members. Tobin advocated greater openness to converts and heightened awareness of diversity within Judaism. This view was among his more controversial, one that he placed against the more common view of Jewish institutions as bulwarks against assimilation. Tobin said in a 2008 JTA op-ed:"No number of day schools or summer camps is going to turn back the clock on religious freedom and competition....It is time for Jews to join every other group in America and quit obsessing about who is being lost and start acting on who might come in".

While Tobin supported a liberal view on Jewish life, he held hard-line positions on Israel and antisemitism.

Tobin fiercely criticized the 2000 National Jewish Population Survey, saying that the study severely undercounted American Jews due to methodological flaws and calling it "utter nonsense". He estimated that over a million more Jews were present in the United States than the 2000 Survey suggested. Tobin stated that the NJPS undercounting occurred due to Jews who do not declare themselves Jewish out of concern for antisemitism, due to under-weighing of West Coast Jews, and as a result of an overly-strict definition of Jews excluding self-described cultural or ethnic Jews.

== Influence and legacy ==
The Forward named Tobin in its 2004 list the Forward Fifty. The Forward highlighted both Tobin's "maverick liberal" positions on conversion and racial diversity on the one hand and on the other hand his work with the neoconservative Foundation for Defense of Democracies, a group founded after 9/11 to oppose radical Islam's spread.

Tobin knew Gershom Sizomu and helped Sizomu enter the rabbinic studies program of American Jewish University.

In 2010, a hospital in Mbale, Uganda was built and dedicated after Tobin with the name the Tobin Health Center. The hospital construction was part of the Abayudaya Community Health and Development Project organized by both the Abayudaya Executive Council and Be’chol Lashon. Sizomu said of the facility, "There, people are treated, so malaria is not a threat now. Infections can be easily handled".
