= George Vid Tomashevich =

- Born: March 3, 1927; Vocin, Kingdom of Yugoslavia
- Died: 3 December 2009 (aged 82); Berkeley, California, United States
- Occupation(s): Writer; Professor

George Vid Tomashevich (Vocin, Kingdom of Yugoslavia, 3 March 1927 – Berkeley, California, 3 December 2009) was a Serbian-American poet, writer and professor of anthropology in the United States of America. He was Professor Emeritus of Anthropology at State University of New York, College at Buffalo.

Tomashevich belonged to a distinguished Serbian family in Slavonia which had taken refuge in Belgrade from the World War II persecution of Serbs in Croatia. His friend, editor Drenka Willen, also suffered the same fate during the time of the Independent State of Croatia.

Tomashevich was a liberal-minded man, both in politics and religion, and an enthusiastic supporter of popular education. He took an interest in the struggle of the Serbs for independence and strongly favoured the establishment of a democratic monarchy (along British lines), which came about in 2002 when Crown Prince Alexander Karađorđević decided to return home to his ancestral roots. Tomashevich was a member of Alexander, Crown Prince of Yugoslavia’s Privy Council. He was also a member of the Serbian Heritage Academy of Canada, based in Toronto, the Serbian Academy of Sciences and Arts (SANU) in Belgrade, and the Nikola Tesla Memorial Society of New York.

He came to the United States shortly after World War II. He received his bachelor's degree in sociology from Roosevelt University and his master's and doctoral degrees in anthropology from the University of Chicago, with a concentration in cultural anthropology. His academic advisor was Robert Redfield. He came to Buffalo in 1968 to teach anthropology at Buffalo State College and retired in 1995.

His academic career included many books, articles and public lectures, as well as contributions to the fields of Anthropology, Sociology, History, Philosophy, Philosophy of History, History of Philosophy and Science, Comparative Religion, Mythology, Linguistics, Folklore and Literature. As a scholar and poet, he wrote movingly on universal human topics, as well as on achievements of Serbian art, history and culture.

== Works (partial list) ==
His works include:

- The Millenniad (2006)
- Songs of Serbia (2002)
- Portraite of Serbian Achievers (2000)
- Continuity and Change in Serbian Civilization in the Wake of the Ottoman Conquest (1957)
- Prizme uma i crca (1985)
- The World as a Metaphor (1997)
- Co-authored with Sofija Škorić: Saint Sava, Patron of Serbia (1986)

== Literature ==
- Škorić, S.; Tomashevich, G. V., eds. (1987). Serbs in Ontario – A Socio-Cultural Description. Toronto: Serbian Heritage Academy. ISBN 0-920069-06-1.
