= Leadership Council of Conservative Judaism =

The Leadership Council of Conservative Judaism (LCCJ) comprises representatives from various rabbinical, cantorial, educational, affinity, and other organizational arms within Conservative Judaism. LCCJ representatives meet twice annually at the Jewish Theological Seminary of America in New York City to coordinate on issues of Conservative movement-wide concern.

An early project of the council was the 1988 publication of Emet ve-Emunah: Statement of Principles of Conservative Judaism. For much of its history, the Conservative movement's leadership avoided formulating systematic explications of faith as a conscious attempt to hold together a broad coalition. The concern largely became a non-issue after the left wing of the movement seceded in 1968 to form an official Reconstructionist denomination of Judaism and after its right wing seceded in 1985 to form the Union for Traditional Judaism. In 1988, the nascent LCCJ gave its imprimatur to Emet ve-Emunah. In accord with classical rabbinic Judaism, it declares that religious Jews must agree upon and hold to particular beliefs. Since no movement within normative Judaism established a binding catechism—partly to avoid parallels with Christianity—there had never been an agreed-upon creed formulated or imbued with theological and halakhic authority throughout Jewish history. Thus, with Emet ve-Emunah, Conservative clergypeople acknowledged a set of beliefs understood as authentically and justifiably Jewish.

Over time, the LCCJ came to include all of the following organizations:

- The Cantors Assembly: Hazzan Steven Stoehr, President
- The Federation of Jewish Men’s Clubs, Robert Braitman, President
- The Jewish Educators Assembly, Lonna Picker, President
- The Jewish Theological Seminary of America, Arnold Eisen, Chancellor
- The Masorti Foundation, Gloria Bieler & Earl Greinetz, Co-Chairs of the Board of Directors
- Masorti Olami, Alan H. Silberman, President
- Mercaz USA, Rabbi Vernon Kurtz, President
- The North American Association of Synagogue Executives, Susan Kasper, President
- The Rabbinical Assembly, Rabbi Alvin Berkun, President
- The National Ramah Commission, Camp Ramah, Morton Steinberg, President
- The Schechter Institute of Jewish Studies, Rabbi David Golinkin, President
- The Solomon Schechter Day School Association, Andrew Cohen, President
- The United Synagogue of Conservative Judaism, Raymond B. Goldstein, President
- Women’s League for Conservative Judaism, Gloria Cohen, President
- The Ziegler School of Rabbinic Studies, Rabbi Bradley Shavit Artson, Dean

== LCCJ Statements ==
- [Statement on National Health Care] - 1992
- [Statement on Intermarriage] - 1995
- [Knesset bill to nullify court ruling on our rabbis] - Attempt by Orthodox Jews to circumvent Israeli High Court rulings on the seating of Conservative and Reform rabbinical nominees to local religious councils.
- [Religious Councils Bill in Israel] - 1999 - Attempt to delegitimize Conservative Judaism in [Israel] by Orthodox political parties.
- [Statement on 9/11 and Rosh HaShanah] - 2001
- [Not accepting Conservative conversions in Israel] - 2002 Statement on attempts by Orthodox Jews and the then Interior Minister of [Israel] to violate Israeli law, and not allow Conservative converts to Judaism to be accepted as Jews.
- [Statement on Israel Self-Defense and Peace] - 2006
