= Gmina Pilzno =

Gmina Pilzno Pilzno Commune
- Gmina
- Coat of arms
- Interactive map of Gmina Pilzno
- Coordinates (Pilzno): 49°58′55″N 21°17′18″E
- Country: Poland
- Voivodeship: Subcarpathian
- County: Dębica
- Seat: Pilzno

Area
  - Total: 165.21 km^{2} (63.79 sq mi)

Population (2006)
  - Total: 17,289
  - Density: 104.65/km^{2} (271.04/sq mi)
  - Urban: 4,411
  - Rural: 12,878
- Website: http://www.pilzno.um.gov.pl/

Gmina Pilzno is an urban-rural gmina (administrative district) in Dębica County, Subcarpathian Voivodeship, in south-eastern Poland. Its seat is the town of Pilzno, which lies approximately 12 kilometres (7 mi) south-west of Dębica and 52 km (32 mi) west of the regional capital Rzeszów.

The gmina covers an area of 165.21 square kilometres (63.8 sq mi), and as of 2006 its total population is 17,289 (out of which the population of Pilzno amounts to 4,411, and the population of the rural part of the gmina is 12,878).

== Villages ==
Apart from the town of Pilzno, Gmina Pilzno contains the villages and settlements of Bielowy, Dobrków, Gębiczyna, Gołęczyna, Jaworze Dolne, Jaworze Górne, Łęki Dolne, Łęki Górne, Lipiny, Machowa, Mokrzec, Parkosz, Podlesie, Połomia, Słotowa, Strzegocice and Zwiernik.

== Neighbouring gminas ==
Gmina Pilzno is bordered by the town of Dębica and by the gminas of Brzostek, Czarna, Dębica, Jodłowa, Ryglice and Skrzyszów.
