= Łęki Górne, Podkarpackie Voivodeship =

Łęki Górne
- Village
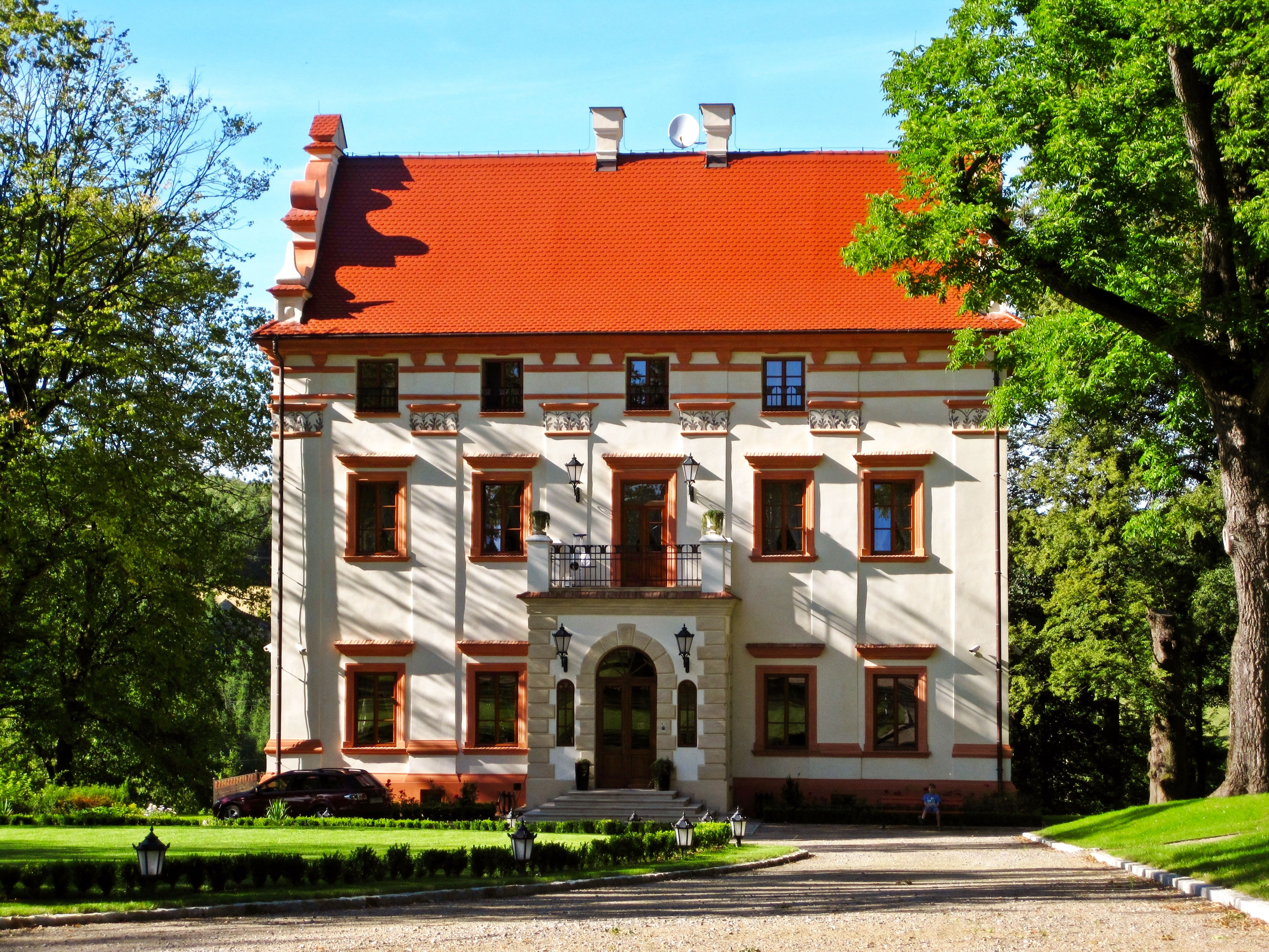
- Renaissance manor house in Łęki Górne

- Location within Poland
- Coordinates: 49°58′26″N 21°10′48″E
- Country: Poland
- Voivodeship: Subcarpathian
- County: Dębica
- Gmina: Pilzno

Population
  - Total: 1,700
- Time zone: UTC+1 (CET)
  - Summer (DST): UTC+2 (CEST)
- Vehicle registration: RDE

Łęki Górne (Polish pronunciation: [ˈwɛŋkʲi ˈɡurnɛ]) is a village in the administrative district of Gmina Pilzno, within Dębica County, Subcarpathian Voivodeship, in south-eastern Poland.

Four Polish citizens were murdered by Nazi Germany in the village during World War II.
