= Parkosz =

- Village
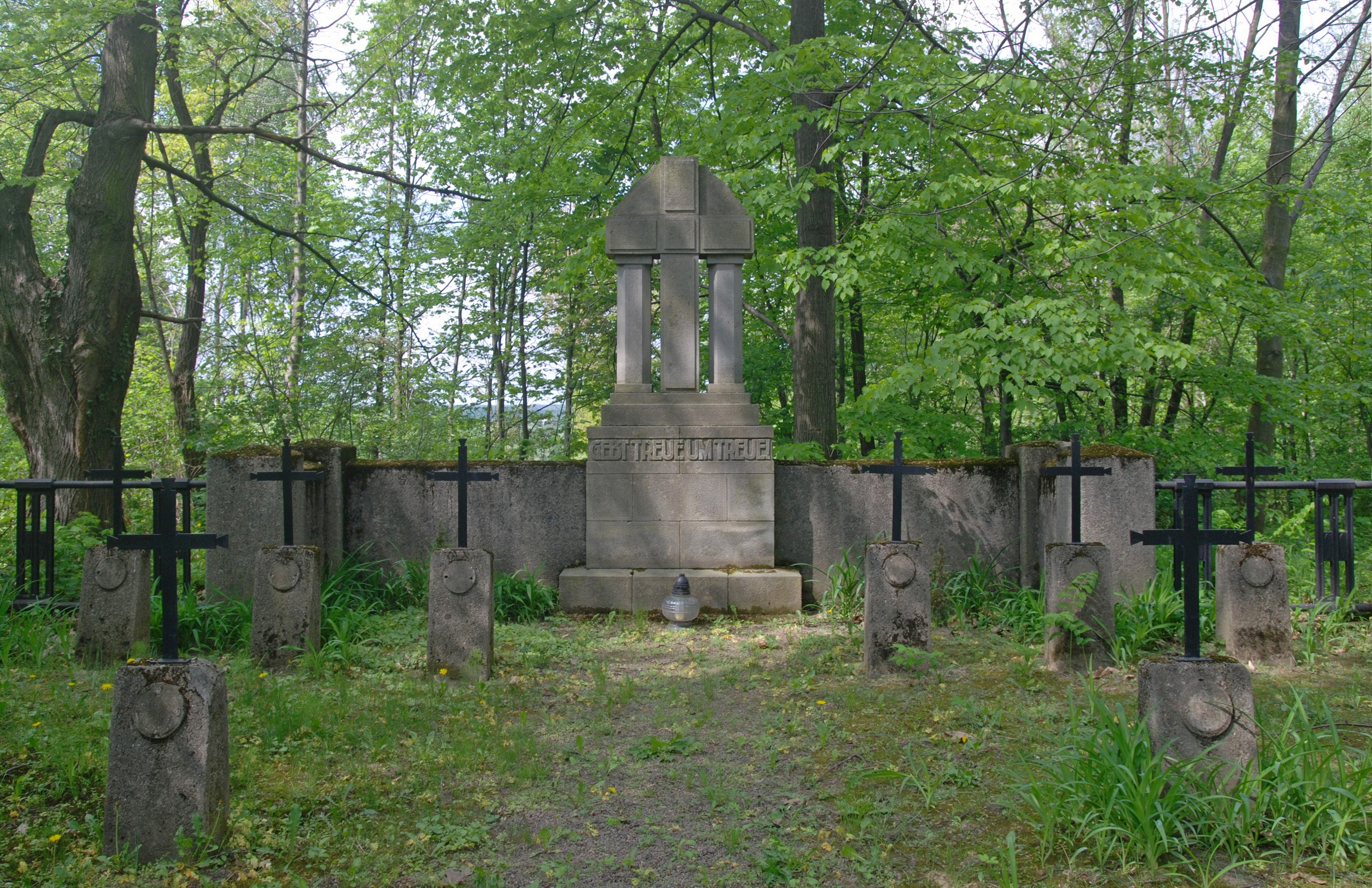
- World War I cemetery in the village

- Location within Poland
- Coordinates: 50°0′N 21°18′E
- Country: Poland
- Voivodeship: Subcarpathian
- County: Dębica
- Gmina: Pilzno

Parkosz [ˈparkɔʂ] is a village in the administrative district of Gmina Pilzno, within Dębica County, Subcarpathian Voivodeship, in south-eastern Poland.
