= Torah Aura Productions =

Jewish educational publishing company

Torah Aura Productions is a Jewish educational publishing company based in Los Angeles, California. It was founded in 1981. The company's main focus is on publishing educational materials (mostly classroom books) for Reform, Conservative, Reconstructionist and unaffiliated Jewish synagogue schools in North America.

== Corporate history ==
“Torah Aura Productions has been founded by a group of Jewish educators, artists, and technicians as a vehicle to enhance the creation of unique and experimental Jewish products and to provide support for those involved in the creative process. We, therefore seek to operate with Jewish values committing ourselves to both the prophets and to profit.”

Torah Aura Productions is a cooperative Jewish communications group that specializes in the creation of high-quality educational materials for Jewish classrooms. It is owned and operated by Jane Golub, Joel Grishaver, and Alan Rowe.

Jane, Joel, and Alan were brought together when they were on the staff of a Jewish educational camp. All of them are successful products of individually diverse Jewish educations, yet all of them felt ambivalent about their Jewish educational experiences. That ambivalence motivated them to further their Jewish learning, to work in Jewish education, and to ultimately come to produce Jewish educational materials.

The actual "creation myth" of Torah Aura Productions goes like this:

In 1981 Alan was running the family business during the week and the P.A. system at the Brandeis-Bardin Institute on weekends. Jane was thinking about a new graduate school, and Joel was free-lancing and tending bar to pay the rent. All of them had worked together at Camp Alonim. Then, everything changed.

Joel had a contract to design a slide show for the Los Angeles Hebrew High School. His car was broken into, the artwork stolen, and the deadline was rushing up. Meanwhile, Jane was house-sitting. Joel, Alan, and some other camp friends moved into Jane's borrowed house and turned it into an animation factory. The end product (finished less than an hour before show time) was The True Story of Hanukkah. Within a few weeks, they were sitting around Alan's dining room table, creating a new kind of Jewish educational company.

== Owners and senior staff members of Torah Aura Productions ==
- Jane Golub, co-owner and executive somebody in charge of everything else
- Alan Rowe, co-owner, director of technology, and chief financial officer
- Joel Lurie Grashaver, co-owner, and creative chair
- Marcia Fogel, bookkeeper, and director of the order desk and shipping department

== Torah Aura's vision and corporate philosophy ==
Torah Aura was founded with a basic vision. According to the owners:

We knew what we wanted to do. We had an idea of what constituted “a good Jewish education,” and we knew the role we believed a publisher should play. Over the next several months we will be sharing those conceptions with you, not to so much for the purpose of selling books, but to facilitate a national dialogue on core issues. We want to hear from you. We want you to demand that other purveyors of educational Judaica make their assumptions and design philosophies equally clear. And, as we work week by week, topic by topic, we want you to think about the way you articulate your school curriculum.

When speaking about their curricular vision, owners and employees of the company usually start by explaining that the purpose of their curricular materials is to save the Jewish people.

The statement may sound like a truism or cliche, but Torah Aura takes it very seriously. They say that it means they believe that students need enough Judaica – and the right Judaica – to build a Jewish future. Torah Aura's observation is that many to most Jews are not taught enough Judaism and to survive as Jews.

For a supplemental school to succeed, it needs to offer a real Jewish foundation. Facts are not a foundation. Concepts are. Feelings are important. They are necessary but not sufficient. Being able to name the objects used on Sukkot doesn’t lead to the building of a personal Sukkah. The ability to perform prayers from the Siddur is an enabling skill, but not one that alone will lead students as they grow to use services as moments of personal connection with the divine.

According to Torah Aura, Jewish schools spend a lot of time on Bible stories, but nowhere near enough on developing the skills of extracting meaning from the biblical text. To survive as a Jew, to care to survive as a Jew, one needs a web of understandings and conceptual tools. Torah Aura was created to produce tools that make the “meanings” of Judaism accessible.

According to Torah Aura (especially co-owner Joel Grishaver), the second thing that leads to Jewish survival is a connection to the community. The simple truth is that Jews who need other Jews are more likely to seek out Jewish connections than those who have just enjoyed some Jewish activities. This is why anyone in the Jewish schooling business pushes camps and youth groups as companion experiences. And, it is why anyone who understands the simplest secret looks to make their classrooms into communities with interdependent learning as a major modality. Equally true, the relationship between teacher and student is critical. It has redemptive possibilities. Because of Torah Aura's belief in community, most of their material (and all of their teacher's guides) recommend work in hevrutot (learning dyads or small groups) and set up situations where students and teachers share in significant conversations.

Most of all, Torah Aura believes that no matter what kind of instruction its owners and employees envision, its reality will be in the hands of teacher and class as they interact. Real curriculum isn't planned, it is actualized. No good lesson should ever happen exactly the same way twice. It is an amalgam of teacher, students, and the moment. For that reason, Torah Aura Productions sees themselves as creating educational tools, resources out of which good teaching moments and good teaching sequences can be built. They explain that they "strive to empower the teacher with challenging resources that lead them towards creating good Jewish educational experiences."

== How Torah Aura Productions creates Jewish educational materials ==
This is the way we work. First, we map out “the structure of the discipline.” This is a list or chart of the things that we believe an adult Jew needs in order to “choose Jewish life.” For example, when we teach values, we look at the resources needed to encourage adults to turn to Jewish resources when then face a real-life ethical dilemma. We then take this map of the discipline and look at the scope and range of instructional opportunities in the course of Jewish education. Will this fit into pre-school? Can we expect it to be included in high school or as part of adult education? Does it fit into a family context? Etc. We then match up the instructional opportunities with the developmental realities. We look to see which part of our map of the discipline can be introduced at each age opportunity. We consider our work experimental and always define it as “work-in-progress.” We have been known to redo a work two or three times, using the laboratory of the market place as a source of feedback. We have always believed that we create tools for Jewish education, that teachers are the ones who turn them into educational experiences. Our work has always been a dialogue between experimental designs and practical applications. We are constantly envisioning new techniques and models and then testing them by the reaction of classroom masters.

== Materials published by Torah Aura Productions ==
=== Books ===
==== Books for students ====
Torah Aura Productions has published hundreds of curricular books for school-aged children, including:

- Being Torah by Joel Grishaver, a Bible textbook for 3rd-4th graders.
- The Circle of Jewish Life by Joel Grishaver, a book about the Jewish lifecycle for 5th and 6th graders
- Artzeinu: An Israel Encounter by Joel Grishaver and Joshua Mason-Barkin with Ethan Bair, a book about Israel for 5th-7th graders
- The Torah Aura Hebrew Prayer Program, an exhaustive set of materials that teach Hebrew and prayer to 3rd-8th-grade students as well as adults. The program includes three distinct series (S'fatai Tiftah, Journeys Through the Siddur, and Pirkei T'fillah) to meet the different needs of schools that meet three days a week, two days a week, or in other configurations. The Program includes textbooks, workbooks, teacher's guides, flashcards, vocabulary posters, and wall posters.
- Apples & Oranges by Rabbi David Lieb, a book about comparative religion for middle- and high-school students.
- I Have Some Questions About God by Rabbi Bradley Shavit Artson, Rabbi Ed Feinstein, Rabbi Elyse Frishman, Rabbi Joshua Hammerman, Rabbi Jeffrey K. Salkin, and Rabbi Sybil Sheridan. It introduces Jewish theological issues to 3rd-4th graders using stories.

==== Books for teachers and educators ====
Torah Aura has also published many books for supplementary school teachers, Jewish educators, and other Jewish educational leaders. This list includes:

- What We Know About Jewish Education (1992), a collection of articles by scholars in the field of Jewish education and geared towards informing the practice of Jewish educators in the field.
- What We Now Know About Jewish Education, edited by Paul Flexner, Roberta Louis Goodman, and Linda Dale Bloomberg. This is a new (and far more exhaustive) update to the What We Know About Jewish Education, published in 2008.
- Teaching Jewishly by Joel Grishaver, "an exploration of how Jewish values influence pedagogy. By using Jewish sources as a foundation, Joel looks at how one creates a classroom based on respect and dignity, that facilitates growth, esteem, and community, and that makes the process of Jewish education an expression of the Jewish message."
- Teaching the Holocaust by Debbie Findling and Simone Schweber.

=== Instant lessons ===
Torah Aura has become well known for publishing sets of educational materials called "Instant Lessons." These are packs of student materials on a single topic meant to provide the teacher with what he or she needs for a single class session.

=== Newsletters and 'Zines ===
Over the years, Torah Aura has published a variety of weekly, bi-weekly, and monthly newsletters for students and teachers.
