= National Jewish Population Survey =

Decennial survey of American Jewry

The National Jewish Population Survey (NJPS), most recently performed in 2000-01, is a representative survey of the Jewish population in the United States sponsored by United Jewish Communities and the Jewish Federation system.

Based on the results of the 2000-01 survey, the total Jewish population in the United States was estimated at 5.2 million, comprising 4.1 million adults and 1 million children. An additional 100,000 Jews in institutional settings were not sampled as part of NJPS but are included in the total. This total represents a decline from the 1990 NJPS, which estimated a total Jewish population of 5.5 million people. Jews who have married since 1996 have an intermarriage rate of 47%.

There is disagreement about how to define who is Jewish. As part of the 2000 NJPS, a Jew was defined as a person:

- Whose religion is Jewish, or
- Whose religion is Jewish and something else, or
- Who has no religion and has at least one Jewish parent or a Jewish upbringing, or
- Who has a non-monotheistic religion, and has at least one Jewish parent or a Jewish upbringing.

There were no survey performed in 2010 due to the lack of funding. The 2000-01 NJPS – which by some estimates cost nearly $6 million, far more than budgeted – was widely criticized, both for its findings and for its methodology. United Jewish Communities, the survey’s sponsor, announced afterward that it would not sponsor future national population surveys.

== Reception ==
The demographer Gary Tobin fiercely criticized the Survey, saying that the it severely undercounted American Jews due to methodological flaws and calling it "utter nonsense". He estimated that over a million more Jews were present in the United States than the 2000 Survey suggested. Tobin NJPS undercounting occurred due to Jews who do not declare themselves Jewish out of concern for antisemitism, due to under-weighing of West Coast Jews, and as a result of an overly-strict definition of Jews excluding self-described cultural or ethnic Jews.
