= Łęki Dolne =

- Village
- Location within Poland
- Coordinates: 49°59′N 21°14′E
- Country: Poland
- Voivodeship: Subcarpathian
- County: Dębica
- Gmina: Pilzno

Population
  - Total: 1,500
- Time zone: UTC+1 (CET)
  - Summer (DST): UTC+2 (CEST)
- Vehicle registration: RDE

Łęki Dolne (Polish pronunciation: [ˈwɛŋkʲi ˈdɔlnɛ]) is a village in the administrative district of Gmina Pilzno, within Dębica County, Subcarpathian Voivodeship, in south-eastern Poland.

Ten Polish citizens were murdered by Nazi Germany in the village during World War II.
