= Conversion to Judaism =

Halakhic adoption of the Jewish religion and identity by non-Jews

Conversion to Judaism (Hebrew: גִּיּוּר, romanized: giyur or Hebrew: גֵּרוּת, romanized: gerut) is the process by which non-Jews adopt the Jewish religion and become members of the Jewish ethnoreligious community. It thus resembles both conversion to other religions and naturalization. The procedure and requirements for conversion depend on the sponsoring denomination. Furthermore, a conversion done in accordance with one Jewish denomination is not a guarantee of recognition by another denomination. Normally, though not always, the conversions performed by more stringent denominations are recognized by less stringent ones, but not the other way around. A formal conversion is also sometimes undertaken by individuals who are raised Jewish or have Jewish ancestry but who may not be considered Jewish according to stringent interpretations of traditional Jewish law.

There are some groups that have adopted Jewish customs and practices. As an example, in Russia the Subbotniks have adopted most aspects of Judaism without formal conversion to Judaism. However, if Subbotniks, or anyone without a formal conversion, wish to marry into a traditional Jewish community or immigrate to Israel under the Law of Return, they must have a formal conversion.

== Terminology ==
The word ger comes from the Semitic root ג־ו־ר, which connotes living abroad. In the Hebrew Bible, a ger is a "foreigner" or "sojourner"; the latter is a foreigner who has settled inside Judah. Marc Angel writes:

The Hebrew ger (in post-Biblical times translated as "proselyte") literally means "resident" and refers to a non-Israelite who lived among the Israelite community. When the Torah commands compassion and equal justice for the ger, it is referring to these "residents". Rabbinic tradition interpreted the word ger as referring to proselytes..."

Angel's explanation of the literal meaning of "ger" as alien is borne out in biblical verses such as Lev 19:34:

The stranger that sojourneth with you shall be unto you as the home-born among you, and thou shalt love him as thyself; for ye were strangers in the land of Egypt: I am the LORD your God.

Another verse which has been interpreted as referring to non-Jews converting to Judaism is Esther 8:17, although no process is described.

The word ger in Numbers 15 is rendered as prosílytos (Koine Greek: προσήλυτος) in the Septuagint and gəyurā (Jewish Palestinian Aramaic: גיורא) in Targum Onkelos on Numbers 15:15–16, which word in both cases denotes a convert to Judaism.

A formal male convert to Judaism is referred to as a ger; the term for a woman convert is giyoret (גִּיוֹרֶת) in Numbers 15:15-16. In Rabbinic Judaism, a ger or giyoret is considered fully Jewish. In Karaite Judaism the term ger only refers to a non-Jew who has yet to convert, and once converted, is no longer called ger.

In the Talmud, ger is used in two senses: ger tzedeq (גֵּר־צֶדֶק) "righteous convert" is a proselyte to Judaism, while a ger toshav "settled foreigner" is a Gentile inhabitant of the Land of Israel who observes the Seven Laws of Noah and has repudiated all links with idolatry.

In Modern Hebrew, the unqualified term ger refers to a ger tzedeq.

== Overview ==
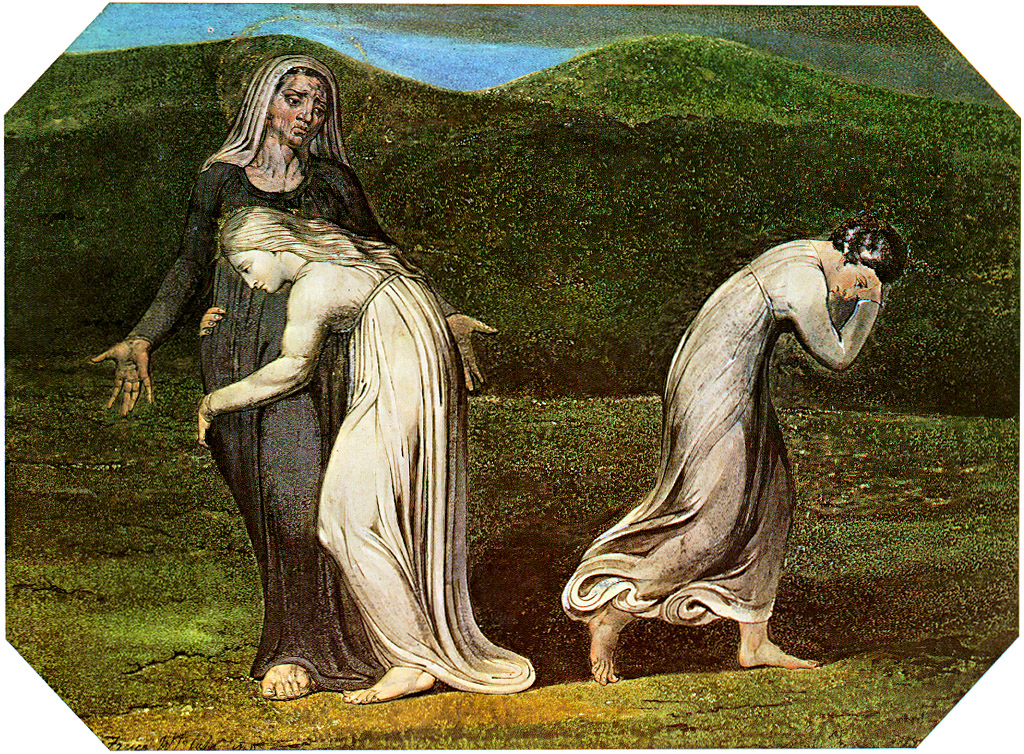
Naomi entreating Ruth and Orpah to return to the land of Moab by William Blake, 1795

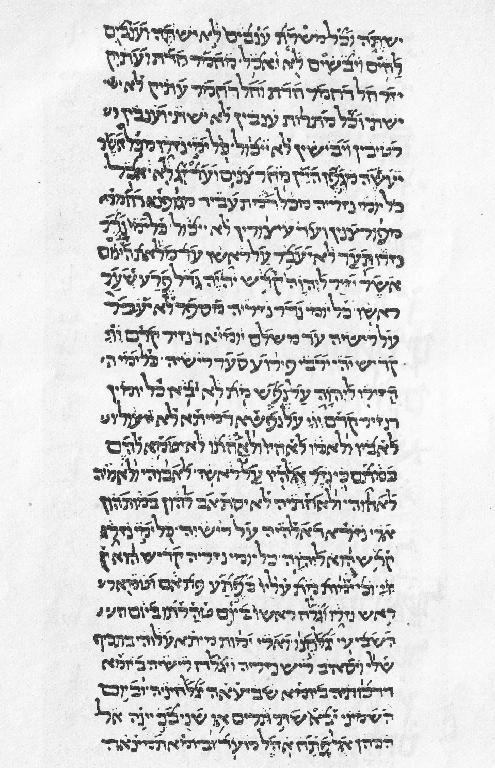
A portion of the Pentateuch in Hebrew, British Library Oriental MS. 1,497 containing Numbers 6:3-10, dated 12th century. Lines of the Pentateuch alternate with the Targum ascribed to Onkelos (a convert to Judaism)

According to Maimonides (Isurei Biah 13:14), converts were accepted since the beginning of Jewish history, and the foreign wives of Jewish leaders—such as Samson and Solomon—were converts. Yet he says (Isurei Biah 13:15) that in the times of Jewish political power, such as the days of Kings David (hypothesized to have been during the 11th or 10th centuries BCE) and Solomon (mid-10th century BCE), batei din (Jewish courts) did not accept converts who may have not had the right intention, and they had to wait and prove their intentions to be legally accepted.

With the notable exception of some Syrian Jewish communities (primarily the Brooklyn, New York, and Deal, New Jersey, communities), all mainstream forms of Judaism today are open to sincere converts, with all denominations accepting converts converted within their denominations. The rules vary between denominations, as does the acceptance of converts from one denomination by another.

For Rabbinic Judaism, the laws governing conversion (gerut) are based on codes of law and texts, including discussions in the Talmud, through the Shulhan Arukh and subsequent interpretations. (Many of the guidelines of accepting converts are based on the Book of Ruth and the manner whereby Ruth was brought into the fold through her mother-in-law, Naomi). These rules are held as authoritative by Orthodox Judaism and Conservative Judaism.

In Judaism, proselytizing is discouraged, and religious gerut is somewhat discouraged. An ancient tradition called for a sponsoring rabbi to discourage potential converts three times. If the potential convert remained adamant in their desire to convert, the rabbi would then begin the process. This practice does not have any solid basis in the written text, and while it may have been the practice in some locations, it was not universal. The tradition is uncommon in modern practice.

To convert, the candidate must have a circumcision if male, and immerse in the mikveh before a beth din comprising three Jewish men who are shomer Shabbat. There is also a requirement to accept the mitzvot (although not necessarily a commitment to keep them).

Today, the process has become more centralized, with the conversion candidate having to convince a rabbi and the beth din of their sincerity, and there will usually be a considerable amount of study. In addition to studying, potential converts are typically expected to become involved in the Jewish community. This includes attending services, participating in holidays and rituals, and building relationships with other Jews in the community. They will then be tested and formally accepted, and the convert is issued a Shtar geirut ("Certificate of Conversion"). As the conversion process becomes more centralized in Israel, there are only a limited number of permanent conversion courts that are acceptable to the Chief Rabbinate of Israel. However, rabbis are willing to conduct decentralized conversions and are recognized by each other. Two of the more prominent of these rabbis are Chuck Davidson and Haim Amsalem.

Conservative halakha takes a more lenient approach than Modern Orthodox Judaism. Its approach to the validity of conversions is based on whether the conversion procedure followed Rabbinic norms rather than the reliability of those performing it or the nature of the obligations the convert undertook. Accordingly, it may accept the validity of some Reform and Reconstructionist conversions, but only if they include immersion in a mikveh before a rabbinical court (beit din) and, for men, circumcision, or a symbolic circumcision for those already circumcised (hatafat dam brit).

The requirements of Reform Judaism for conversions are extremely different and far more lenient. The denomination states that "people considering conversion are expected to study Jewish theology, rituals, history, culture, and customs, and to begin incorporating Jewish practices into their lives. The length and format of the course of study will vary from rabbi to rabbi and community to community. However, most now require a course in basic Judaism and individual study with a rabbi, as well as attendance at services and participation in home practice and synagogue life."

Although an infant conversion might be accepted in some circumstances, such as in the case of adopted children or children whose parents convert, children who convert would typically be asked if they want to remain Jewish after reaching religious adulthood, which is 12 years of age for a girl and 13 for a boy. This standard is applied by Orthodox and Conservative Judaism, which accept halakha as binding and normative.

Reconstructionist Judaism values the symbolism of the conversion ritual and encourages those who were not born of Jewish parents and who wish to convert to undergo this rite of passage. The Reconstructionist course of study for a prospective convert, which the rabbi and congregation determine the individual is working with, includes history, observance, beliefs, and learning to make educated choices. The completion of the process is marked by ritual immersion for men and women; circumcision or hatafat dam brit (a symbolic drop of blood) for men (unless there exists an extraordinary physical or emotional hazard); a valid beth din (in Reconstructionist conversions, dialogue with three "knowledgeable Jews", at least one of whom is a rabbi), and often a public welcoming ceremony.

Karaite Judaism does not accept the Talmud and, therefore, has different requirements for conversion. Traditionally non-proselytizing, Karaite Judaism's long-standing abstention from conversions was recently lifted. On 1 August 2007, the Karaites reportedly converted their first new members in 500 years. At a ceremony in their Northern California synagogue, ten adults and four minors swore fealty to Judaism after completing a year of study. This conversion comes 15 years after the Karaite Council of Sages reversed its centuries-old ban on accepting converts.

Humanistic Judaism postulates that "conversion" does not suit the process of becoming a Jew, as it implies a change in belief, which is not chosen like behavioral changes. The shift is better described as naturalization, affiliation, or adoption, reflecting alterations in family ties and cultural aspirations rather than fundamental belief changes.

== In ancient times ==
In antiquity, conversion to Judaism appears to have been a voluntary and individual process, rather than the result of organized missionary efforts. While some non-Jews did convert—both men and women—because they found Judaism or elements of it appealing, no unambiguous evidence suggests that Jews actively sought to convert others. The question of Jewish missionary activity remains debated, but existing evidence does not support the notion that Jews deliberately approached non-Jews with the goal of turning them into Jews.

Louis Feldman's views on active Jewish missionizing have changed. While viewing classical Judaism as being receptive to converts, especially from the second century BC through the first century AD, he points to a lack of either missionizing tracts or records of the names of rabbis who sought converts as evidence for the lack of active Jewish missionizing. Feldman maintains that conversion to Judaism was common and the Jewish population was large both within the Land of Israel and in the Diaspora. According to Lester L. Grabbe, although there are "various references to proselytizing in the literature from the Greek and Roman periods", "it seems unlikely that there was a major 'mission' on the part of the Jews to gain Gentile converts."

Other historians believe that conversion during the Roman era was limited in number and did not account for much of the Jewish population growth, due to various factors such as the illegality of male conversion to Judaism in the Roman world from the mid-second century. Another factor that made conversion difficult in the Roman world was the halakhic requirement of circumcision, a requirement that proselytizing Christianity quickly dropped. The Fiscus Judaicus, a tax imposed on Jews in 70 AD and relaxed to exclude Christians in 96 AD, also limited Judaism's appeal.

=== Early debate on requirement for circumcision ===
According to The Jewish Encyclopedia article on circumcision, in the first century AD, before the Mishnah was edited, the requirement for circumcision of proselytes was an open issue between the Zealots and liberal parties in ancient Israel. Joshua ben Hananiah argued that besides accepting Jewish beliefs and laws, a prospective convert to Judaism must undergo immersion in a mikveh. In contrast, Eliezer ben Hurcanus makes circumcision a condition for the conversion. A similar controversy between the Shammaites and the Hillelites is given regarding a proselyte born without a foreskin: the former demanding the spilling of a drop of blood symbolic of the Brit Milah, thereby entering into the covenant; the latter declaring it to be unnecessary.

In discussions about the necessity of circumcision for those born of a Jewish mother, lending some support to the need for circumcision of converts, the Midrash states: "If thy sons accept My Godhead [by undergoing circumcision] I shall be their God and bring them into the land; but if they do not observe My covenant in regard either to circumcision or to the Sabbath, they shall not enter the land of promise" (Midrash Genesis Rabbah xlvi). "The Sabbath-keepers who are not circumcised are intruders, and deserve punishment" (Midrash Deut. Rabbah i).

However, the opposing view is supported in the Babylonian Talmud by Joshua ben Hananiah: "A male convert who has been immersed but not circumcised, or circumcised but not immersed, is a convert." Note this view is later rejected by the Talmud.

Josephus in Antiquities of the Jews, Book 20 Chapter 2, recorded the story of King Izates of Adiabene who decided to follow the Law of Moses at the advice of a Jewish merchant named Ananias. He was going to get circumcised, but his mother, Helen, who herself embraced the Jewish customs, advised against it on the grounds that the subjects would not stand to be ruled by someone who followed such "strange and foreign rites". Ananias likewise advised against it, on the grounds that worship of God was superior to circumcision (Robert Eisenman in James the Brother of Jesus claims that Ananias is Paul the Apostle, who held similar views, although this is a novel interpretation lacking support in mainstream scholarship) and that God would forgive him for fear of his subjects. So Izates decided against it. However, later, "a certain other Jew that came out of Galilee, whose name was Eleazar," who was well versed in the Law, convinced him that he should, on the grounds that it was one thing to read the Law and another thing to practice it, and so he did. Once Helen and Ananias found out, they were struck by great fear of the possible consequences, but as Josephus put it, God looked after Izates. As his reign was peaceful and blessed, Helen visited the Second Temple to thank God, and since there was a terrible famine at the time, she brought much food and aid to the people of Jerusalem.

== Requirements ==
The Amoraim who produced the Talmud set out basic requirements for conversion to Judaism (Keritot 8b), which must be witnessed and affirmed by a beth din (a rabbinical court composed of three Jewish males above the age of Bar Mitzvah). The judges on the Beth Din should be observant of Jewish law. Common Orthodox practice is for all of the judges to be Rabbis or Orthodox clergy. Today conversion requirements and the time required to complete conversion differ according to denomination and rabbinic sponsor. The basic requirements set out in the Talmud include:

- Circumcision (Brit milah or hatafat dam brit) for men. If the male is already circumcised, a single drop of blood is drawn as a symbolic circumcision
- Immersion (tevilah) in a ritual bath (mikveh) for both men and women
- Offering a certain sacrifice (korban) in the Temple (the Beit Hamikdash) (this is not currently required as a part of modern conversion to Judaism)

The consensus of halakhic authorities also requires a convert to understand and formally accept the duties of classical Jewish law. This is not stated explicitly in the Talmud, but was inferred by subsequent commentators.

After confirming that all these requirements have been met, the beth din issues a "Certificate of Conversion" (Shtar Giur), certifying that the person is now a Jew.

== Modern practice ==
The requirements for conversions vary somewhat within the different branches of Judaism, so whether or not a conversion is recognized by another denomination is often an issue fraught with religious politics. The Orthodox rejection of non-Orthodox conversions is derived less from qualms with the conversion process itself, since Conservative and even some Reform conversions are very similar to Orthodox conversions with respect to duration and content, but rather from that the Orthodox presumption that the convert was not properly instructed in Jewish Law to Orthodox Jewish standards. The conflicting interpretations of whether non-Orthodox conversions are considered valid also have implications for converts aiming to acquire Israeli citizenship as personal status in Israel is heavily influenced by the decisions of the Great Rabbinical Court in Israel, which rejects non-Orthodox conversions. Furthermore, there have been arguments made by scholars such as Hacker which argue that modern conversions are significantly influenced by the gender of the convert. This is due to the jurisdiction of the Great Rabbinical Court in Israel regarding personal status of Israeli citizens, which does not recognize interfaith marriages and does not recognize children of paternal Jews as Jewish if the mother is not or has not converted to Orthodox Judaism.

In general, immersion in the mikveh is an important part of a traditional conversion. If the person who is converting is male, circumcision is a part of the traditional conversion process as well. If the male who is converting has already been circumcised, then a ritual removal of a single drop of blood will take place (hatafat dam brit). However, more liberal branches of Judaism have a more relaxed requirement of immersion and circumcision.

== Maturity ==
Someone who converts as a minor (younger than 12 for a girl and 13 for a boy) is required to fulfill the requirements of conversion, that is circumcision and mikvah, but are not required to perform an 'acceptance of the mitzvoth'. The conversion instead is done al daat beth din, i.e. the acceptance is done by the Beth Din presiding over the conversion. The child lives as a Jew until their bar/bat mitzvah and they then have the option of rejecting their conversion. Once they have accepted to continue as a Jew the conversion can no longer be rejected.

== Reform Jewish views ==
In the United States, Reform Judaism rejects the concept that any rules or rituals should be considered necessary for conversion to Judaism. In the late 19th century, the Central Conference of American Rabbis, the official body of American Reform rabbis, formally resolved to permit the admission of converts "without any initiatory rite, ceremony, or observance whatsoever." (CCAR Yearbook 3 (1893), 73–95; American Reform Responsa (ARR), no. 68, at 236–237.)

Although this resolution has often been examined critically by many Reform rabbis, the resolution still remains the official policy of American Reform Judaism (CCAR Responsa "Circumcision for an Eight-Year-Old Convert" 5756.13 and Solomon Freehof, Reform Responsa for Our Time, no. 15.) Thus, American Reform Judaism does not require ritual immersion in a mikveh, circumcision, or acceptance of mitzvot as normative. Appearance before a Beth Din is recommended, but is not considered necessary. Converts are asked to commit to religious standards set by the local Reform community.

In actual practice, the requirements for conversion of any individual are determined by the Rabbi who sponsors the convert. Typically, Reform Rabbis require prospective converts to take a course of study in Judaism, such as an "Introduction to Judaism" course, to participate in worship at a synagogue, and to live as a Jew (however that is interpreted by the individual Rabbi) for a period of time. A period of one year is common, although individual Rabbis' requirements vary. When the sponsoring Rabbi feels that the candidate is ready, a Beth Din may be convened. Other rituals such as immersion in a mikvah, circumcision (or Hatafat dam brit), and a public ceremony to celebrate the conversion, are also at the discretion of the Rabbi.

== Interdenominational views ==
In response to the tremendous variations that exist within the Reform community, the Conservative Jewish movement attempted to set a nuanced approach. The Conservative Committee on Jewish Law and Standards has issued a legal opinion stating that Reform conversions may be accepted as valid only when they include the minimal Conservative halachic requirements of milah and t'vilah, appearance before a Conservative Beth Din, and a course of Conservative study. (Proceedings of Committee on Jewish Law and Standards: 1980–1985, pp. 77–101.)

In general, branches of Orthodox Judaism consider non-Orthodox conversions either inadequate or of questionable halachic compliance, and such conversions are therefore not accepted by these branches of Judaism. Conversely, both Conservative and Reform Judaism accept the Orthodox conversion process as being valid. Since 2008, Haredi Orthodox religious courts in Israel have been rejecting conversions from a number of Orthodox rabbis, since the Chief Rabbinate do not accept the authority of the presiding rabbis.

== Intra-Orthodox controversy ==
In 2008, a Haredi-dominated Badatz in Israel annulled thousands of conversions performed by the Military Rabbinate in Israel. The Chief Rabbinate of Israel, which is the only state-recognized authority on religious matters, backed by Rabbi Ovadia Yosef, ruled against this, making the annulment legally invalid for purposes of Israeli law.

== Karaite views ==
As of 2006, the Moetzet Hakhamim (Council of Sages) began to accept converts to Karaite Judaism through the Karaite Jewish University. The process requires one year of learning, circumcision (for males), and the taking of the vow that Ruth took:

כִּי אֶל-אֲשֶׁר תֵּלְכִי אֵלֵךְ, וּבַאֲשֶׁר תָּלִינִי אָלִין—עַמֵּךְ עַמִּי, וֵאלֹהַיִךְ אֱלֹהָי. בַּאֲשֶׁר תָּמוּתִי אָמוּת, וְשָׁם אֶקָּבֵר; כֹּה יַעֲשֶׂה יְהוָה לִי, וְכֹה יוֹסִיף—כִּי הַמָּוֶת, יַפְרִיד בֵּינִי וּבֵינֵךְ.

"For whither thou goest, I will go; and where thou lodgest, I will lodge; thy people shall be my people, and thy God my God; where thou diest, will I die, and there will I be buried; the L do so to me, and more also, if aught but death part thee and me." Ruth 1:16–17

== Attempts to resolve the "Who is a Jew?" issue ==
=== 1950s: proposed joint beth din ===
In the 1950s Rabbi Joseph Soloveitchik and other members of the Rabbinical Council of America engaged in a series of private negotiations with the leaders of Conservative Judaism's Rabbinical Assembly, including Saul Lieberman; their goal was to create a joint Orthodox-Conservative national beth din for all Jews in the United States. It would create communal standards of marriage and divorce. It was to be modeled after the Israeli Chief Rabbinate, where all the judges would have been Orthodox, while it would have been accepted by the larger Conservative movement as legitimate. Conservative rabbis in the Rabbinical Assembly created a Joint Conference on Jewish Law, devoting a year to this effort.

For a number of reasons, the project did not succeed. According to Orthodox Rabbi Louis Bernstein, the major reason for its failure was the Orthodox rabbis' insistence that the Conservative Rabbinical Assembly agree to expel Conservative rabbis for actions they took prior to the formation of the new beth din, and the RA refused to do so. According to Orthodox Rabbi Emanuel Rackman, former president of the RCA, the major reason for its failure was pressure from haredi Orthodox rabbis, who held that any cooperation between Orthodoxy and Conservatism was forbidden. In 1956, Rabbi Harry Halpern, of the Joint Conference wrote a report on the demise of this beth din. He writes that negotiations between the Orthodox and Conservative denominations were completed and agreed upon, but then a new requirement was demanded by the RCA: The RA must "impose severe sanctions" upon Conservative rabbis for actions they took before this new beth din was formed. Halpern writes that the RA "could not assent to rigorously disciplining our members at the behest of an outside group." He goes on to write that although subsequent efforts were made to cooperate with the Orthodox, a letter from eleven Rosh Yeshivas was circulated declaring that Orthodox rabbis are forbidden to cooperate with Conservative rabbis.

=== 1978–1983: Denver program, patrilineal descent ===
In Denver, Colorado, a joint Orthodox, Traditional, Conservative and Reform Bet Din was formed to promote uniform standards for conversion to Judaism. A number of rabbis were Orthodox and had semicha from Orthodox yeshivas, but were serving in synagogues without a mechitza; these synagogues were called traditional Judaism. Over a five-year period they performed some 750 conversions to Judaism. However, in 1983 the joint Beth Din was dissolved, due to the unilateral American Reform Jewish decision to change the definition of Jewishness:

The move was precipitated by the resolution on patrilineality adopted that year by the Central Conference of American Rabbis. This decision to redefine Jewish identity, as well as the designation of Denver as a pilot community for a new Reform out reach effort to recruit converts, convinced the Traditional and Conservative rabbis that they could no longer participate in the joint board...the national decision of the Reform rabbinate placed the Traditional and Conservative rabbis in an untenable position. They could not cooperate in a conversion program with rabbis who held so different a conception of Jewish identity. And furthermore, they could not supervise conversions that would occur with increasing frequency due to a Reform outreach effort that was inconsistent with their own understanding of how to relate to potential proselytes.

— Wertheimer, A People Divided

Specifically, in 1983, the Central Conference of American Rabbis passed a resolution waiving the need for formal conversion for anyone with at least one Jewish parent who has made affirmative acts of Jewish identity. This departed from the traditional position requiring formal conversion to Judaism for children without a Jewish mother. The 1983 resolution of the American Reform movement has had a mixed reception in Reform Jewish communities outside of the United States. Most notably, the Israel Movement for Progressive Judaism has rejected patrilineal descent and requires formal conversion for anyone without a Jewish mother. However, in 2015 the majority of Britain's Assembly of Reform Rabbis voted in favor of a position paper proposing "that individuals who live a Jewish life, and who are patrilineally Jewish, can be welcomed into the Jewish community and confirmed as Jewish through an individual process." Britain's Assembly of Reform Rabbis stated that rabbis "would be able to take local decisions – ratified by the Beit Din – confirming Jewish status."

The end of the joint Beth Din program was welcomed by Haredi Orthodox groups, who saw the program as illegitimate. Further, Haredi groups attempted to prevent non-Orthodox rabbis from following the traditional requirements of converts using a mikveh. In the Haredi view, it is better to have no conversion at all than a non-Orthodox conversion, as all non-Orthodox conversions are not true conversions at all according to them.

=== 1980s: proposed Israeli joint beth din ===
In the 1980s Modern Orthodox Rabbi Norman Lamm, Rosh Yeshiva of Yeshiva University, along with other American and Israeli Orthodox rabbis, worked with Conservative and Reform rabbis to come up with solution to the "Who is a Jew?" issue. In 1989 and 1990 Israeli Prime Minister Yitzhak Shamir spearheaded an effort to find a way to resolve the impasse.

A plan was developed by Israeli Cabinet Secretary Elyakim Rubenstein, who negotiated secretly for many months with rabbis from Conservative, Reform and Orthodox Judaism, including faculty at Yeshiva University, with Lamm as Rosh Yeshiva. They were planning to create a joint panel that interviewed people who were converting to Judaism and considering making aliyah (moving to the State of Israel), and would refer them to a beth din that would convert the candidate following traditional halakha. All negotiating parties came to agreement:

1. Conversions must be carried out according to halakha
2. the beth din (rabbinic court) overseeing the conversion would be Orthodox, perhaps appointed by the Chief Rabbinate of Israel, and
3. there would be three-way dialogue throughout the process.

Many Reform rabbis took offense at the notion that the beth din must be strictly halakhic and Orthodox, but they acquiesced. However, when word about this project became public, a number of leading haredi rabbis issued a statement denouncing the project, condemning it as a "travesty of halakha". Rabbi Moshe Sherer, Chairman of Agudath Israel World Organization, stated that "Yes we played a role in putting an end to that farce, and I'm proud we did." Norman Lamm condemned this interference by Sherer, stating that this was "the most damaging thing that he [Sherer] ever did in his forty year career."

Rabbi Lamm wanted this to be only the beginning of a solution to Jewish disunity. He stated that had this unified conversion plan not been destroyed, he wanted to extend this program to the area of halakhic Jewish divorces, thus ending the problem of mamzerut.

=== 1987: Brichto proposal ===
In 1987, American-born British rabbi, Sidney Brichto, of the country's Liberal Judaism movement, published widely-discussed proposals for a historic compromise between progressive streams of Judaism and Orthodox Judaism. He advocated for the Orthodox Beit Din to oversee contentious areas. In return, progressive rabbis would earn respect from the Orthodox rabbinate, a degree of recognition and a role in Beit Din processes concerning progressive Jewry. Brichto's proposals encouraged rabbi John Levi to support such an initiative in Melbourne.

Among Brichto's proposals, progressive streams of Judaism would stop processing their own conversions to Judaism. Instead, their prospective converts would have their status conferred on them by an Orthodox Beit Din. The Beit Din would be expected to show more leniency than usual, but only expecting that those before them demonstrate knowledge of Orthodox practice rather than observance.

The proposal was rejected by Immanuel Jakobovits, Baron Jakobovits, then Chief Rabbi of the United Hebrew Congregations of the Commonwealth. Jakobovits reasoned: "How can an Orthodox Beth Din validate a conversion without kabbalat mitzvot [acceptance of the commandments]?"

However, in 1990, the Chief Rabbi-elect, Jonathan Sacks was more favourable to the proposal. In a letter to Brichto, he wrote: "As soon as I read your article... I called it publicly 'the most courageous statement by a non-Orthodox Jew this century'. I felt it was a genuine way forward. Others turned out not to share my view." He continued: "It will be a while - 18 months - before I take up office. But I believe we can still explore that way forward together. For if we do not move forward, I fear greatly for our community and for Am Yisrael."

=== 1997: Neeman Commission proposal ===
In 1997 the issue of "Who is a Jew?" again arose in the State of Israel, and Orthodox leaders such as Rabbi Norman Lamm publicly backed the Neeman commission, a group of Orthodox, Conservative and Reform rabbis working to develop joint programs for conversion to Judaism. In 1997 Lamm gave a speech at the World Council of Orthodox Leadership, in Glen Springs, New York, urging Orthodox Jews to support this effort:

Lamm told his listeners that they should value and encourage the efforts of non-Orthodox leaders to more seriously integrate traditional Jewish practices into the lives of their followers. They should welcome the creation of Reform and Conservative day schools and not see them as a threat to their own, Lamm said. In many communities, Orthodox day schools, or Orthodox-oriented community day schools, have large numbers of students from non-Orthodox families. The liberal movements should be appreciated and encouraged because they are doing something Jewish, even if it is not the way that Orthodox Jews would like them to, he said. "What they are doing is something, and something is better than nothing," he said in his speech. "I'm very openly attacking the notion that we sometimes find in the Orthodox community that 'being a goy is better'" than being a non-Orthodox Jew, he said in an interview.

The committee recommended the establishment of a joint institute for Jewish studies, which would be a joint effort by all three streams of Judaism. The committee also recommended that conversion proceedings themselves be held in special conversion courts, to be recognized by all denominations in Judaism. The purpose of the proposal was to prevent a rift in the Jewish people, while at the same time bringing about a state-sponsored arrangement for conversion. On 7 September 1998, the government adopted the Ne'eman Commission Report.

A year later, the Joint Institute for Jewish Studies was established, and since then it has been the official state operator of conversion courses in Israel, including the military conversion courses. In 2015 the institute's name was changed to Nativ – The National Center for Jewish Studies, Identity and Conversion.

=== Conversion annulments ===
A recent development has been the idea of annulling conversions to Judaism, sometimes many years after they have taken place, due to a reduction in religious observance or change of community by the convert. Chuck Davidson, a Modern Orthodox expert on this conversion crisis explains "From the Middle Ages onwards, the greatest of the rabbis wrote explicitly that even if immediately after the conversion the convert goes off to worship idols, the person is still considered Jewish." The justification given for the change in approach is that the original conversion must never have been valid in the first place as it is clear from the convert's subsequent actions they were insincere at the time of conversion.

A situation of confusion in Jewish identity in Israel was made worse when Haredi Rabbi Avraham Sherman of Israel's supreme religious court (בית הדין הרבני הגדול) called into question the validity of over 40,000 Jewish conversions when he upheld a ruling by the Ashdod Rabbinical Court to retroactively annul the conversion of a woman who came before them because in their eyes she failed to observe Jewish law.

This crisis deepened when Israel's Rabbinate called into question the validity of soldiers who had undergone conversion in the army, meaning a soldier killed in action could not be buried according to Jewish law. In 2010, the rabbinate created a further distrust in the conversion process when it began refusing to recognize orthodox converts from the United States as Jewish. The great-niece of the renowned Zionist Nahum Sokolow was recently deemed "not Jewish enough" to marry in Israel, after she failed to prove the matrilineal Jewish descent for four generations.

Following a scandal in which U.S. Rabbi Barry Freundel was arrested on charges of installing hidden cameras in a mikveh to film women converts undressing, the Israeli Chief Rabbinate said it would review the validity of all past conversions performed by Freundel, then quickly reversed its decision, clarifying that it was joining the Orthodox Rabbinical Council of America in affirming the validity of the conversions.

In December 2014 an Israeli court decided that a conversion could be annulled. In his decision Justice Neal Hendel wrote: "Just as the civil court has the inalienable authority to reverse – in extremely rare cases – a final judgment, so too does the special religious conversion court. For otherwise, we would allow for judgments that are flawed from their inception to exist eternally."

== Consequences ==
Once undergone, a valid religious conversion to Judaism cannot be overturned. However, a Beth Din may determine that the conversion is void as it was never undertaken correctly in the first place, for example, if the rite of mikveh was performed incorrectly. In recent years, many Orthodox conversions have been overturned. In 2008 Israel's highest religious court invalidated the conversion of 40,000 Jews, mostly from Russian immigrant families, even though they had been approved by an Orthodox rabbi. Debate on what constitutes a valid Beth Din for conversion and for annulling conversions has caused divisions in the Orthodox world. It is an implicit judgment on the character and uprightness of the rabbis in that religious court. For example, when Rabbi Barry Freundel was arrested on charges of voyeurism for filming women converts at the mikveh he supervised, Israel's Chief Rabbinate initially threatened to review and possibly invalidate the conversions Freundel had been involved in approving. A crisis between American and Israeli rabbis was averted when the Chief Rabbinate agreed that all conversions completed by Freundel would be considered valid.

=== Relations between Jews and proselytes ===
Judaism is not an openly proselytizing religion. Judaism teaches that the righteous of all nations have a place in the afterlife. Much like in the other Abrahamic faiths, Jewish law requires the sincerity of a potential convert. In view of the foregoing considerations, most authorities are very careful about it. Essentially, they want to be sure that the convert knows what they are getting into, and that they are doing it for sincerely religious reasons. However, while conversion for the sake of love for Judaism is considered the best motivation, a conversion for the sake of avoiding intermarriage is gaining acceptance also.

There is a tradition that a prospective convert should be turned away three times as a test of sincerity, though most rabbis no longer follow the tradition. Neither the Rabbinical Council of America nor the Rabbinical Assembly, the leading American Orthodox and Conservative organizations, suggest taking this action in their conversion policies, with the Central Conference of American Rabbis (CCAR) and Union for Reform Judaism (URJ) actively opposing its practice.

=== Halakhic considerations ===
Halakha forbids the mistreatment of a convert, including reminding a convert that they were once not a Jew. Hence, little to no distinction is made in Judaism between those who are born Jewish and those who are Jewish as a result of conversion. However, despite Halakha protecting the rights of converts, some Jewish communities have been accused of treating converts as second-class Jews. For example, many communities of Syrian Jews have banned conversion and refuse to recognise any Jewish conversion, including those done under Orthodox auspices (possibly influenced by sects in Syria like the Druze which do not accept converts).

According to Orthodox interpretations of Halakha, converts face a limited number of restrictions. A marriage between a female convert and a kohen (members of the priestly class) is prohibited and any children of the union do not inherit their father's kohen status. While a Jew by birth may not marry a mamzer, a convert can. Descendants of converts can become rabbis. For instance, Rabbi Meir Baal Ha Nes is thought to be a descendant of a proselyte. Rabbi Akiva was also a very well-known son of converts. The Talmud lists many of the Jewish nation's greatest individuals who had either descended from or were themselves converts. Asenath, the wife of Joseph (son of Jacob), is mentioned as a possible convert. There are Midrash attesting to her conversion along with other women. This includes Hagar, Zipporah, Shiphrah, Puah, the Daughter of Pharaoh, Rahab, Ruth, and Jael. In fact, King David is descended from Ruth, a convert to Judaism. (Ruth 4:13–22) In Orthodox and Conservative communities that maintain tribal distinctions, converts become Yisraelim (Israelites), ordinary Jews with no tribal or inter-Jewish distinctions. Converts typically follow the customs of their congregations. So, a convert who prays at a Sephardi synagogue would follow Sephardi customs and learn Sephardi Hebrew.

A convert chooses his or her own Hebrew first name upon conversion but is traditionally known as the son or daughter of Abraham and Sarah, the first patriarch and matriarch in the Torah, often with the additional qualifier of "Avinu" (our father) and "Imenu" (our mother). Hence, a convert named Akiva would be known, for ritual purposes in a synagogue, as "Akiva ben Avraham Avinu"; in cases where the mother's name is used, such as for the prayer for recovery from an illness, he would be known as "Akiva ben Sarah Imenu".

Talmudic opinions on converts are numerous; some positive, some negative. A quote from the Talmud labels the convert "hard on Israel as a scab". Many interpretations explain this quote as meaning converts can be unobservant and lead Jews to be unobservant or converts can be so observant that born Jews feel ashamed.

== Bnei Anusim ==
In recent decades, there has been a renewed Jewish conversion interest with some Bnei Anusim, that is, the descendants of Jews who were forced to convert to other faiths.

The Hebrew term for forced converts is "Anusim" (lit. "forced [converts]"), while the descendants of said converts are called "Bnei Anusim" (lit. "children of forced [converts]").

In the modern era, the single most notable and numerous group of Bnei Anusim converts are the Sephardic Bnei Anusim, descendants of those Sephardic Jews who were forced to convert to Christianity during the Spanish and Portuguese Inquisition. They are found throughout Iberia (Spain and Portugal) and Iberoamerica (the Hispanic countries of the Americas plus Brazil). There has been a continuous steady growth among them who are now prospective converts, actively seeking conversions back to Judaism.

Since many Bnei Anusim (i.e. descendants of forced converts) lack an unbroken matrilineal Jewish line of descent or lack satisfactory documentary evidence to that effect (even if they can prove Jewish ancestry along one or all other of their lineages besides their direct matrilineal lineage), conversion has been a growing option for them to return to Judaism.

== See also ==
- Abraham ben Abraham
- Lord George Gordon
- Kuzari
- List of converts to Judaism
- Machon Meir
- Miller Introduction to Judaism Program
- Proactive conversion
- Outreach Judaism
- Gerim
