= Miller Introduction to Judaism Program =

Educational institute based at the American Jewish University

Coordinates: 34°07′40.18″N 118°28′17.95″W

The Louis and Judith Miller Introduction to Judaism Program is an educational program based at the American Jewish University (AJU) in Los Angeles, California. Founded in 1986, the program provides instruction in Judaism for individuals seeking to learn about Judaism, explore their Jewish roots, or prepare for conversion to Judaism. Although based in Los Angeles, the Miller Intro Program is offered online and in-person around the world and is open to people from all backgrounds.

The program is a comprehensive 18-week course that explores Jewish beliefs, holidays, rituals, contemporary life, ethics and values. Miller Intro classes are taught by rabbis, who guide participants through the study of Judaism and support those looking to convert.

From 2012 to 2022, the program was directed by Rabbi Adam Greenwald. During his tenure, he founded the Maas Center for Jewish Journeys at AJU and authored One One Foot—the course book and guiding curriculum for the program. For his work with Miller Intro Program, he is a recipient of the Covenant Foundation's Pomegranate Prize in Jewish Education.

Since 2022, the program has been directed by Rabbi Tarlan Rabizadeh, AJU's Vice President of Jewish Engagement, Director of the Maas Center—of which Miller Intro to Judaism is a part of. In 2026, AJU hired Rabbi John Carrier as the Senior Rabbi and Director of Jewish Education to help administer the program.

The Miller Intro program is endorsed by the Rabbinical Assembly of America, and by other clergy. Conversions performed under the program's auspices are recognized by the State of Israel for purposes of making Aliyah.

== See also ==
- American Jewish University
- Conversion to Judaism
- Proactive conversion
