= Simone Schweber =

- Occupation: Professor
- Known for: Holocaust education

Simone Schweber is Goodman Professor of Education and Jewish Studies at the University of Wisconsin–Madison.
