= Criticism of Conservative Judaism =

Criticism of Conservative Judaism is widespread in the Orthodox Jewish community, although the movement also has its critics in Reform Judaism and in other streams of Judaism. While the Conservative movement professes fidelity to Jewish tradition, it considers Halakha (Jewish religious law) to be a dynamic process that needs reinterpreting in modern times. The criticism by Orthodox Jews and traditionalists within the movement itself revolves around the following:

- Conservative Judaism, or some of its decisions and positions does not follow halakha, according to many Orthodox Jews, because:
  - The legal analyses of its rabbinate deconstruct or manipulate religious obligations, rather than being faithful to and fostering respect for them;
  - It issues "emergency decrees" in the absence of legitimate emergencies, rather than following a legitimate, faithful, or reverential approach to halakha;
  - Its decisions consistently lead to more lax, rather than stringent or balanced observance;
  - It generally makes communal decrees through a council of (often lay) leaders, rather than relying exclusively on Talmudic scholars, resulting in decisions reflecting popular opinion rather than scholarship; and
  - Accommodating the values and likeness of the broader society has taken precedence over a dedication to the internal integrity of halakhic sources.

Critics also claim that the legal analysis of the Conservative movement tends to be ideologically driven, resulting in intended outcomes to such an extent that it is outside the bounds of traditional halakhic analysis.

== Criticism from Orthodoxy ==
From Haredi Judaism perspective, criticism is exemplified by Rabbi Avi Shafran of Agudath Israel of America. Shafran wrote in 2001 that the Conservative movement's leaders "trample" halakha while proclaiming fealty to it. He argued that the movement was a failure because nearly three-quarters of Conservative Jews said that they consider a Jew to be anyone raised Jewish, even if his or her mother was a gentile—the official Reform position, rejected by Conservative leaders as nonhalachic. Shafran further argued that Conservative Judaism "movement is not honest" because, though stating its commitment to halakhah (Jewish law), it approved the ordination of women based on a commission containing mostly laypeople and only one Talmud scholar. Shafran stated that the movement should have relied on the Talmud faculty of JTS. Similarly, in 2006, Rabbi Shafran criticized the decision by the Conservative movement's Committee on Jewish Law and Standards to adopt a responsum liberalizing its position on homosexual conduct. Shafran repeated his assertion that the Conservative movement, despite its "claim of halachic integrity", did not follow the "true halachic process".

Moreover, Rabbi Avi Weiss, an Open Orthodox rabbi on the left wing of Orthodox Judaism, also characterized the differences between Orthodox and Conservative Judaism in a manner critical of the Conservative approach:

Despite variations in style and approach, the system that we hold as holy sets us fundamentally apart from our Conservative co-religionists whose vision of the Jewish legal process is so very different in each of these three fundamental areas of Halakha: Torah mi-Sinai ["Torah from Sinai", the belief that the Torah was given by God to Moses on Mount Sinai], rabbinic interpretation, and rabbinic legislation.

The belief in Torah mi-Sinai is, for all Orthodox Jews, the foundation of faith and at the core of the halakhic process. Conservative Judaism does not subscribe to this teaching. Moreover, in the area of rabbinic law, we Orthodox—Modern and Right alike—contend that legal authority is cumulative, and that a contemporary posek (legal decisor) can only issue judgments based on a full history of Jewish legal precedent. In contrast, the implicit argument of the Conservative movement is that precedent provides illustrations of possible positions rather than binding law. Conservatism, therefore, remains free to select whichever position within the prior legal history appeals to it. Likewise, we adhere and turn to the wisdom of the most distinguished religio-legal authorities in making Halakhic determinations. Not so the Conservatives. Truth be told, when the Conservative movement faced some of its most controversial "new halakhot", such as the ordination of women, it turned away from its own Talmudic scholars and experts in Halakha, who had almost universally rejected the reasoning on which this new practice was to be based, and who have since virtually all left the faculty of the Jewish Theological Seminary.

Finally, in understanding the value of rabbinic law legislated by today's rabbis, it must be appreciated that at this juncture in our people's history in America, the Orthodox community is blessed with large numbers of ritually observant Jews. Across the spectrum of Orthodoxy, myriads of people meticulously keep Shabbat (the Sabbath), Kashrut (the Dietary Laws), Taharat ha-mishapahah (the Laws of Family Purity) and pray three times a day. Thus, if a "permissive custom" is accepted, it can become binding. This is not true of Conservatism's constituency, which is generally not composed of ritually-observant Jews. Thus, only in our community if a "permissive custom" is accepted, can it be meaningful.

== Criticism from Conservative traditionalists ==
At the 2006 convention of the Rabbinical Assembly, the Conservative movement's official rabbinical organization, Rabbi Ismar Schorsch said that the Conservative movement had "lost faith in itself" and "become Reform".

In an interview, Rabbi Schorsch, who was about to retire as Chancellor of the Jewish Theological Seminary, criticized rabbis and activists who were lobbying to change the Conservative movement's opposition to same-sex unions and the ordination of gay clergy. He described their methods as using scholarship to overturn halakha rather than to foster appreciation of it.

If the Conservative movement chooses to do something at the expense of the halachic system, then it's going to pay the price down the road... The erosion of our fidelity to Halacha is what brings us close to Reform Judaism.

Rabbi Schorsch made similar criticism two months later in his final commencement address at Jewish Theological Seminary, in which he spoke of the "malaise of Conservative Judaism", its "impoverishment", and its "grievous failure of nerve". He also criticized the Seminary, one of the chief academic and intellectual institutions of Conservative Judaism:

In the wake of Mordecai Kaplan's wholesale reduction of halakhah to folkways, the function of history shifted to vindicating change. Ever more identified by the inane mantra of "tradition and change," Conservative Judaism lost access to critical scholarship as a source for religious meaning, with nothing substantially spiritual to replace it. ...

Our impoverishment is sadly exemplified by the ambivalence toward critical scholarship in Etz Hayim, the movement's new humash. As commentary, the abridgement of the Jewish Publication Society Torah Commentary is so eviscerated as to betray not the slightest trace of the plenitude of the original to generate spiritual meaning through empathetic scholarship. As exposition, the end notes, with a few striking exceptions, are spiritually inert. Their rabbinic authors go through the paces without passion, making no effort to extract religious significance from the scholarship being mediated. While Conservative rabbis often chide the research oriented faculty of JTS for allegedly doing just that in their classes, as transmitters of scholarship, the rabbis replicated what they condemn. Ironically, the rare spiritual voice to be heard in the end notes usually emanates from one or another of the academics in the roster. ...

With history no more than an argument for supersession, the halakhic yoke has lost its lightness. Great scholarship has ceased to energize it as it had in the past. Once, the polarity of truth and faith at the Seminary had made it home for the acme of twentieth-century Jewish scholarship, a venue of ferment and fertility. Faith once moved us to study our heritage deeply, while truth asked of us that we do it critically, in light of all that we know. Willful ignorance was never an acceptable recourse. The interaction set us apart as the vital center of modern Judaism.

With frequency, fundamental changes come more easily. Our forebearers embraced history to enlarge and enrich Jewish observance; we wield it, if at all, to shrink it. How quickly have we forgotten the bracing spiritual power of Gershon Scholem's Major Trends in Jewish Mysticism, Yehezkel Kaufmann's Religion of Israel, Saul Lieberman's Hellenism in Jewish Palestine, Nahum Sarna's Understanding Genesis, or Jacob Milgrom's commentaries to Leviticus and Numbers. Our addiction to instant gratification has stripped us of the patience to appreciate any discourse whose rhetoric is dense and demanding. Mindlessly, we grasp for the quick spiritual fix.

A grievous failure of nerve affects Conservative Judaism. We have lost confidence in the viability of the distinctive polarity that once resonated within. It is not a slick new motto that we need, but a vigorous reaffirmation of the old which gloriously captures our essence. When Schechter left England in 1902 to head the Seminary, he inveighed against Anglo–Jewry for its shallow quest for a decorous spiritual Judaism. What the confounding epoch of emancipation actually called for, he claimed, was more spiritual Jews. To educate and inspire Jews of such sturdy timbre remains the unaltered mission of a vastly expanded Seminary in an age of pampered and promiscuous individualists contemptuous of all norms. A Seminary true to itself still holds out the brightest beacon for the future of Conservative Judaism.

Rabbi David Golinkin, the chair of the Masorti movement's Va'ad Halakha (Israel's counterpart to the Committee on Jewish Law and Standards), criticized the Conservative movement's proposal to liberalize its position on homosexual conduct. He wrote that such a change would "split the Conservative movement in two ... drive away the most halakhically observant laypeople in our synagogues, and ... have a devastating effect on the Conservative movement throughout the world." According to Rabbi Golinkin, if the Conservative movement adopted such a change, most Israelis would see little difference between the Masorti movement (Israeli Conservative Judaism in Israel) and Reform Judaism.

Rabbi Joseph Prousser, a member of the Committee on Jewish Law and Standards, also lobbied against the proposal, arguing that its adoption would result in "a fractured Conservative movement" that is "rendered less viable". He wrote that adopting such a change would represent a "failure of moral and religious leadership" and that such a significant change would diminish the Conservative rabbinate's ability to provide meaningful religious guidance to its congregants:

Such sweeping change in Jewish law will make the Law Committee and the Conservative rabbinate poor role models for our religious charges. If we essentially declare so fundamental a halachic obligation inoperative, based on a minority’s subjective reading of contemporary reality, how can we deny individual Jews unbridled autonomy in determining which demands of Jewish law remain binding and personally meaningful? Jewish law would be rendered unrecognizable—as law—to our laity, and to all but the most erudite and progressive legal theorists. ...

Lending credence to the notion that a person’s core identity is defined by physical drives and sexual desire represents a failure of moral and religious leadership. Rabbinic discourse that even unintentionally vests moral authority in the inclination of the individual, rather than in the will of a commanding God, seems a far graver transgression than prohibited, albeit loving, expressions of intimacy between homosexuals.

After the Committee on Jewish Law and Standards adopted the responsum liberalizing its position on homosexual conduct, Rabbi Prouser and three other members of the Committee—Rabbis Joel Roth, Mayer Rabinowitz, and Leonard Levy—resigned in protest.

== Criticism from Reform Jews ==
Rabbi Paul Menitoff, Executive Vice President of the Reform movement's Central Conference of American Rabbis, wrote in a 2004 essay that Conservative Judaism would either merge with Reform Judaism or "disappear". Rabbi Menitoff said that the Conservative movement's policies were at odds with the principles of its young adult members on issues such as intermarriage, patrilineal descent, and the ordination of lesbians and gay men—all issues that Conservative Judaism then-opposed yet Reform Judaism supported. (The Conservative movement has since liberalized its policy concerning the ordination of gay clergy.) To support his prediction, Rabbi Menitoff described Conservative Judaism's dilemma:

If the Conservative movement capitulates regarding these core differences between Reform and Conservative Judaism, it will be essentially obliterating the need for its existence. If, alternatively, it stands firm, its congregants will vote with their feet.

Rabbi Menitoff's essay drew criticism from Conservative rabbis, two of whom described his prediction as "off base" and "wishful thinking". Rabbi Ismar Schorsch, then Chancellor of the Jewish Theological Seminary, pointed out that "at the beginning of the 20th century, all the Jewish pundits predicted the demise of Orthodoxy, and they all proved dead wrong. So Rabbi Menitoff has good company in bad predictions."

== Criticism from third-wave feminists ==
Some third-wave feminists have criticized Conservative Judaism's efforts at integrating women as half-hearted attempts at egalitarianism. Instead of maintaining a traditional approach to worship and treating women as if they were men, what Dr. Rachel Adler calls "honorary men", some have suggested that the Conservative movement cannot become truly egalitarian until it reinterprets Judaism to reflect the perspectives and experiences of women.

In her 1998 book Engendering Judaism: An Inclusive Theology and Ethics, Adler wrote:

For many Conservative congregations, counting women in the minyan and calling them up to the Torah are recent innovations. But ... egalitarian Judaisms may tolerate women as participants by ignoring their distinctive experiences and concerns as women.
