= Joel Roth (rabbi) =

American rabbi

- Title: Rabbi, Professor

Personal life
- Born: May 15, 1940 (age 86)

Religious life
- Religion: Conservative Judaism
- Ordination: 1968

Joel Roth (born May 15, 1940) is an American rabbi in the Rabbinical Assembly, which is the rabbinical body of Conservative Judaism. He is a former member and chair of the assembly's Committee on Jewish Law and Standards (CJLS) which deals with questions of Jewish law and tradition, and serves as the Louis Finkelstein Emeritus Professor of Talmud and Jewish Law at the Jewish Theological Seminary of America (JTSA or JTS) in New York City, where he formerly served as dean of the Rabbinical School. He is also Rosh Yeshiva (head of school) Emeritus of the Conservative Yeshiva in Jerusalem, an institution founded and maintained by the United Synagogue for Conservative Judaism and under the academic auspices of JTS. In 2006, Roth took over as chair of the Hebrew Language department at JTS.

== Education ==
Roth received a BA from Wayne State University in his hometown of Detroit. He received his master's degree at JTS, where he was ordained in 1968. That same year, Roth was appointed to the faculty of JTS as he continued his studies toward a PhD in Talmud, which he received in 1973. In the early 1970s Roth taught at the Prozdor of the Highland Park (N.J.) Conservative Temple and Center. Upon receiving his Ph.D., he was made an associate professor at JTS. Roth has held four key administrative positions, serving as dean of students of List College (then called Seminary College), director of the Melton Research Center for Jewish Education, and both associate dean and dean of the rabbinical school.

== Career ==
Roth served as dean of the rabbinical school from 1981 to 1984 as well as in 1992–1993, resigning both times after a major scandal. Roth resigned in 1984 as part of a settlement of a potential lawsuit by the family of a student whom Roth had allegedly sexually harassed. The accusation was kept secret at the time, coming to light only when an anonymous letter surfaced in 1993 during Roth's second term as dean. Then, on March 29, 1993, Roth resigned after he allegedly made a sexually explicit statement to a student at the seminary's West Coast affiliate, the Los Angeles-based University of Judaism (now the American Jewish University), during a group interview.

An expert in Conservative approaches to and interpretations of Halakha, Roth was appointed to the Committee on Jewish Law and Standards (CJLS) in 1978, and served as chairman for eight years. Many of his CJLS responsa have been published in collections by the Rabbinical Assembly and the United Synagogue of Conservative Judaism. In addition to articles and responsa for the committee, Roth is the author of The Halakhic Process: A Systemic Analysis and Sefer ha-Mordecai: Tractate Kiddushin. He is most well known for writing an influential responsum supporting the ordination of women as rabbis, which was considered by the JTS faculty as part of its 1983 women's ordination decision. Roth is also the author of a responsum arguing that homosexuality is forbidden specifically to Jews, supporting reaffirmation of the Conservative movement's then-current stance excluding openly gay individuals from JTS rabbinic and cantorial schools, but arguing against a view that non-heterosexuality is generally immoral or a social wrong.

On December 6, 2006, Roth resigned from the CJLS after a paper coauthored by Rabbis Elliot N. Dorff, Daniel S. Nevins, and Avram Reisner on same-sex relationships and the ordination of gay and bisexual rabbis was accepted by the committee, despite upholding the biblical prohibition on male same-sex intercourse. The committee simultaneously adopted a diametrically opposed responsum by Roth on the topic, which maintained a complete ban on same-sex sexual activities.
