= Theodore Friedman =

American Conservative rabbi

Theodore Tuvia Zvi Friedman
- תיאודור טוביה צבי פרידמן
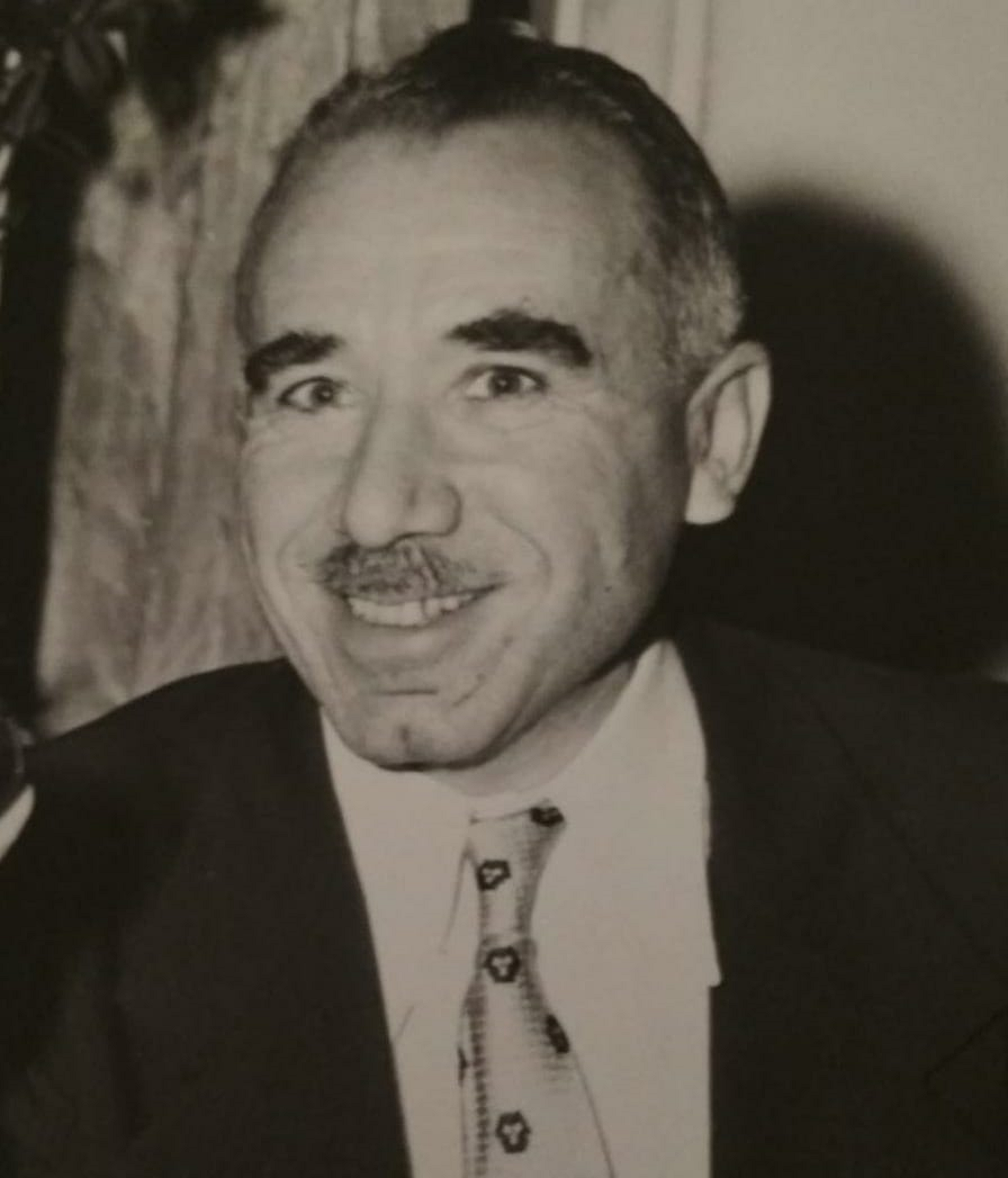
- Born: January 11, 1908; Stamford, Connecticut, United States
- Died: December 18, 1992 (aged 84); Jerusalem, Israel
- Burial place: Jerusalem, Israel
- Other name: Teddy
- Education: Columbia University (MA, PhD), Jewish Theological Seminary of America, City College of New York
- Occupations: Rabbi, author

Theodore Tuvia Zvi Friedman (Hebrew: תיאודור טוביה צבי פרידמן; January 11, 1908 – December 18, 1992) was an American and Israeli conservative rabbi, spiritual leader, and author. From 1962 to 1964, he served as the president of The Rabbinical Assembly, the international association of Conservative rabbis. During his tenure, he supported the African-American Civil Rights Movement.

== Biography ==
Born in Stamford, Connecticut, United States, on January 11, 1908, to Chaim Zvi Harry (Wilkemerski) and Anna Kapit (Kapetulsky) Friedman. His parents immigrated to the United States from Lithuania (father) and from Russia (mother).

He graduated from the City College of New York (1929). In 1931 he was ordained a rabbi by the Jewish Theological Seminary of America, where he served as an associate professor. He earned a PhD from Columbia University in 1952.

Friedman served the Beit El Congregation in northern Bergen, New Jersey (1931–1942), Beit David Congregation in Buffalo, N.Y (1942–1944), the Jewish Center of Jackson Heights, Queens, New York City (1944–1954), where he founded a Hebrew high school. In 1954 Friedman became rabbi of Congregation Beth El, South Orange, New Jersey (1954–1970).

Friedman was an authority in Jewish education and a member of the Board of Governors of the National Academy of Adult Jewish Studies; he organized an innovative adult education program at Beth El based on a four-year curriculum that he designed.

Friedman also chaired the Rabbinical Assembly's Hebrew Culture Committee (1944–46) and was President of the Long Island Region of the Rabbinical Assembly (1947).

In 1948 he presented to the Rabbinical Assembly's annual convention, "Towards a Philosophy of Conservative Judaism", one of the key position papers, which led to the reorganization of the Rabbinical Assembly's Committee on Jewish Law into the Committee on Jewish Law and Standards of the Rabbinical Assembly (CJLS). Here he effectively argued for going beyond Halakha in addressing the many problems of Jewish life.

Friedman chaired the Committee on Jewish Law and Standards from 1951 until 1954 and wrote many decisions, including on family issues, divorce, and Agunah. Friedman co-chaired the Steering Committee and was secretary of its national Bet Din. As Vice-president of the Rabbinical Assembly (1960–62), he led the committee that revised its constitution.

Friedman headed The Rabbinical Assembly as president from 1962 until 1964.

In addition to his work on behalf of the Rabbinical Assembly, he taught homiletics at the Seminary and was a member of the Jewish Book Council of America.

Friedman taught at the Seminario Rabínico Latinoamericano (Latin American Rabbinical Seminary, also known as the Marshall T. Meyer Latin American Rabbinical Seminary, named for Friedman's son-in-law rabbi Marshall Meyer), a Jewish religious, cultural, and academic center in Buenos Aires, Argentina.

In 1970 Friedman immigrated to Israel upon his retirement from the active rabbinate. Following his retirement in 1970, he was elected Rabbi Emeritus of Congregation Beth El, South Orange. Since his aliya, he held a leadership role in the Israeli branch of the Rabbinical Assembly. Friedman taught at the Schechter Institute of Jewish Studies and was its first head of Va'ad Halakhah, founded in 1985 by the Rabbinical Assembly of Israel. The Va'ad Halakhah addressed halakhic questions from Israel and Europe in Hebrew.

From 1970 to 1973, Friedman served on the Executive Council of the Jewish Agency in Jerusalem.

Friedman died in Jerusalem, where he lived, on December 18, 1992.

=== Activities, attitudes, and spiritual perception ===
Friedman played a leading role in guiding the Rabbinical Assembly as it expanded in new directions in post-World War II.

Rabbi Friedman presided over the Rabbinical Assembly when it took the most significant social action stand in its history.

During his tenure as President of the Rabbinical Assembly, he supported the African-American Civil Rights Movement.

While the Rabbinical Assembly convention was in session in May 1963, Martin Luther King Jr. led demonstrations against police brutality in Birmingham, Alabama. During the convention, the call was sounded that a group of rabbis should go to Birmingham as representatives of the Rabbinical Assembly and demonstrate solidarity with the cause. At an earlier session on the second day of that convention, the question was raised about how spiritual leaders could be concerned only with Nazi cruelty when acts of injustice to fellow human beings were taking place in the USA.

Rabbi Friedman was among the decision-maker that sent a delegation of 19 rabbis to protest against police violence in Birmingham, Alabama.

In presenting the resolution to send a delegation, Rabbi Friedman stressed that their presence was "urgent and of great importance." After the vote endorsing the resolution, Rabbi Friedman noted: "You go not only with our official endorsement to speak and act in our name, but you go with our heartfelt blessings and prayers. I want you to go feeling that we have not merely passed a resolution. You are our shlihim. We want you to go in that spirit...".

As the Rabbinical Assembly's president, he worked to build bridges with the other Jewish denominations. He called upon his fellow rabbis to speak from their pulpits to encourage their congregants to embrace the causes of civil rights and Soviet Jewry. Friedman was one of the pioneering supporters of the Soviet Jewry Movement.

Rabbi Friedman opposed the definition of Judaism as racist by its very nature. His view was that the belief in a single God brought the idea of universality to the world. In his opinion, despite the harsh statements in Jewish sources against Idolatry, it should be interpreted in their historical context.

His spiritual approach was that while commitment and loyalty to the Halakha are beyond doubt, the Halakha should be interpreted, as it has always been interpreted, given the social, economic, and moral conditions prevailing at the time and the need and ability to meet the needs of the hour while remaining faithful to its sources.

As a member of the CJLS, Rabbi Friedman collaborated with Morris Adler and Jacob B. Agus to allow the use of electricity on Shabbat. He also allowed community members to ride to the synagogue on Shabbat with the intention of fulfilling the Shabbat mitzvot. The reasoning was that many American Jews were now living far from synagogues as an unavoidable consequence of modern life. Unless Jews were permitted to drive to synagogue, most American Jews would lose their connection to Jewish life. His position was adopted by the Committee on Jewish Law and Standards.

Rabbi Friedman was part of efforts by the Jewish Seminary to solve the long-standing crisis of the Agunah, a woman deserted by her husband and prohibited by Jewish law from remarriage. This led to the establishment of a Joint Law Conference of the Rabbinical Assembly and the Seminary as the Conservative movement's sole authority for adjudicating matters involving the Jewish laws of marriage and divorce.

Rabbi Friedman was concerned by attempts of extremist religious elements to polarize the American Jewish community into two opposing groups – religious and secularist – and their claim that they and they alone represent the Jewish religious community. He was also concerned by possible legislation in Israel that would abridge religious freedom in Israel. He led a fight against the Israeli Rabbinate to recognize Jewish religious divorces granted by American Conservative rabbis. As part of that struggle, the Rabbinical Assembly engaged Gideon Hausner, Israel's former Attorney General, to represent Israel on the issue.

Friedman believed that anyone who claims that it is forbidden to return any part of "Eretz Yisrael hashleimah" ["the complete land of Israel"] has no basis in the Halakha and that the controversy over the question of the Greater Land of Israel is a political conflict and there is no connection between the controversy and the Halakha. He conclusively showed that there is no such concept of the whole land of Israel in Jewish tradition because Israel's borders changed countless times throughout Jewish history, both in theory and in practice.

Friedman believed that conversion for marriage is valid, and the acceptance of the Yoke of the Mitzvot should not be a requirement where there is a fear that the converted will not keep all the mitzvot.

He believed that the establishment of the State of Israel was a great salvation for the Jewish people and a decisive turning point in history of the Jewish people. Therefore, the mourning customs should be shortened on Tisha B'Av by not completing the fast and ending with a great Mincha.

Friedman also believed that according to the Halakha, it is permissible to extradite a Jewish murderer abroad and that the best Halakhic scholars in all generations have ruled that if a criminal caused damage and sorrow to rabbis from Israel, he must be extradited.

=== Writings ===
Friedman was a member of the editorial board of the Conservative Judaism journal, which dealt with Jewish thought and was published by The Rabbinical Assembly and the Jewish Theological Seminary of America, between 1953 and 1961, where he published some of his articles. Conservative Judaism was one of the earliest attempts to articulate the Jewish Conservative movement's theology.

Friedman was co-editor, with Robert Gordis, of Jewish Life in America (1955), an expansion of the special issue Judaism published in 1954 to celebrate the tercentenary of American Jewry. He wrote a column called "Letters to Jewish College Students" (1965), which discusses issues of Judaism and the modern life of college students. After immigrating to Israel, he wrote a column called "Letter from Jerusalem," published in Conservative Judaism.

Friedman was an editor of Encyclopedia Judaica.

During his lifetime, he published over 200 articles in English, Hebrew and Spanish.

=== Books ===
Friedman authored the following books:

- Judgment and Destiny (1965), a selection of his sermons published to mark the tenth anniversary of his rabbinate at Beth El.
- The Rabbis' Bible: Later Prophets (with Solomon Simon and Abraham Rothberg).
- Jewish Life in America
- Letters to Jewish College Students

=== Personal life ===
In 1931 Friedman married Ruth Braunhut (1910 – 1973) and had three children: rabbi Hillel Friedman, Naomi Meyer, and Judy Rotem Z"L. His son-in-law, rabbi Marshall Meyer, was a leading American Conservative rabbi who was also known for his human rights activities during the "Dirty War" in Argentina (1976–1983). After the restoration of democracy in Argentina in 1983, Meyer was awarded Argentina's highest honor, the Order of the Liberator General San Martín, by the new president. His other son-in-law was rabbi David Joseph Spritzer, a Conservative rabbi who was one of the founders of the Hod Ve Hadar congregation in Kfar Saba, Israel. His grandson, Gabriel Meir Halevi, is a musician, peace activist and master of ceremonies and multicultural workshops. His granddaughter Rachel D. Friedman is a Professor and Chair of Greek and Roman Studies at Vassar College. His granddaughter Dodi Meyer is a professor of pediatrics at Columbia University Medical Center.
