= David Golinkin =

American–Israeli rabbi (born 1955)

Rabbi David Golinkin דוד גולינקין
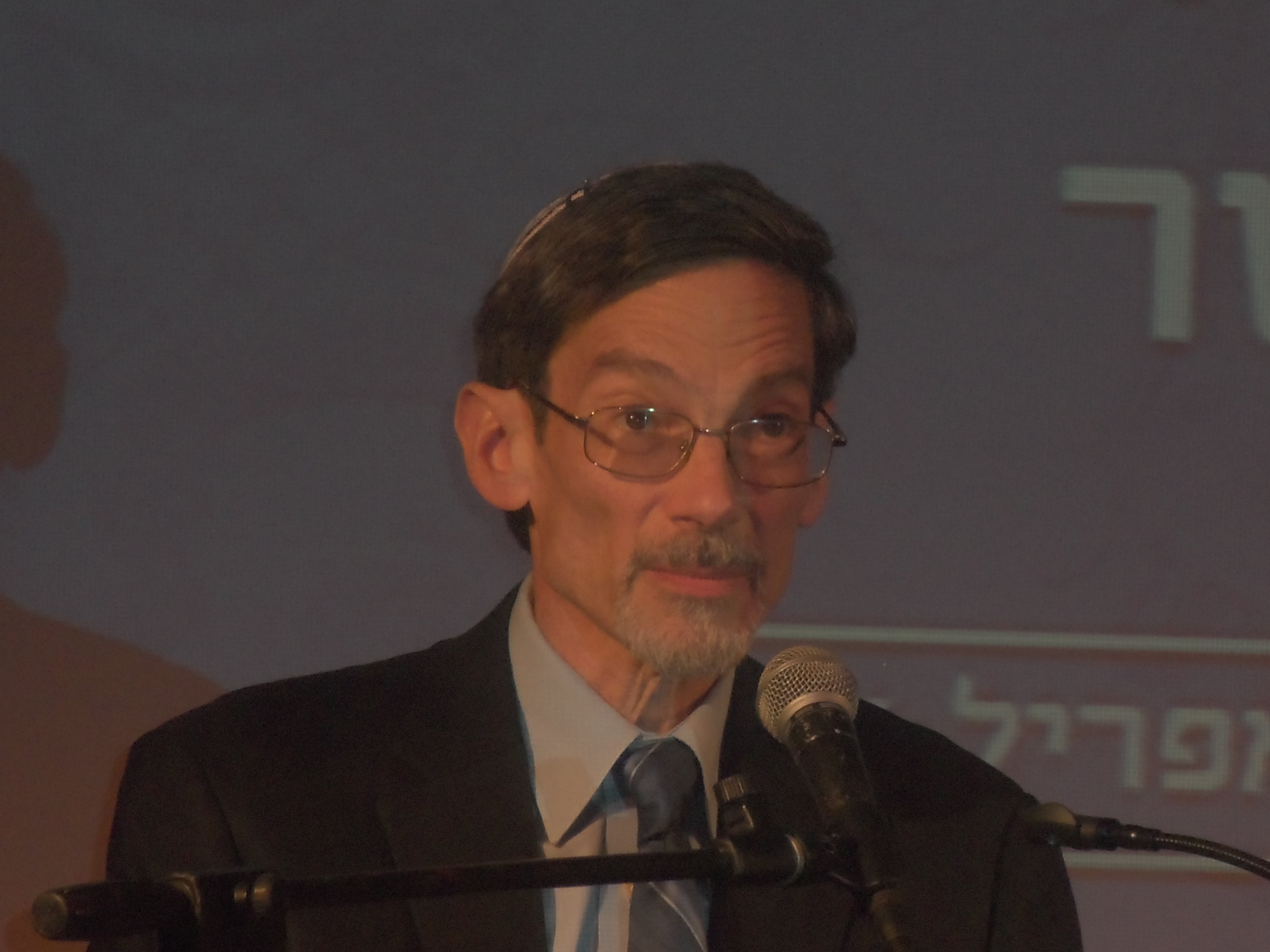

Personal life
- Born: 1955 (age 70–71) Arlington, Virginia
- Education: Hebrew University of Jerusalem, Jewish Theological Seminary of America

Religious life
- Religion: Judaism
- Denomination: Conservative Judaism
- Profession: Rabbi, Professor

David Golinkin (Hebrew: דוד גולינקין; born 1955) is an American-born Conservative rabbi and Jewish scholar who has lived in Jerusalem since 1972. As of July 1, 2025, he is President Emeritus of the Schechter Institutes, Inc., President Emeritus of the Schechter Institute of Jewish Studies, and Professor of Jewish Law at the Schechter Institute of Jewish Studies in Jerusalem.

== Biography ==
Golinkin was born and raised in Arlington, Virginia. He made aliyah (moved to Israel) in 1972, earning a B.A. in Jewish history and two teaching certificates from the Hebrew University of Jerusalem. He received an M.A. in rabbinics and a Ph.D. in Talmud from the Jewish Theological Seminary of America, where he was also ordained as a rabbi. He is the grandson of Mordechai Ya'acov Golinkin, who was the Chief Rabbi of Zhitomir and Danzig and the Av Bet Din (rabbinical court president) of the Rabbinical Council of New England; and the son of Noah Golinkin, also a rabbi.

== Rabbinic and academic career ==
Golinkin began teaching Talmud at JTS in New York in 1980 and taught Talmud and Jewish law at Neve (Note: nˈɛve͡ɪ) Schechter, the Israeli branch of JTS, in 1982. In 1987, he started teaching Talmud and Jewish law at the Seminary of Judaic Studies (later known as the Schechter Institute of Jewish Studies) in Jerusalem. Between 1990 and his September 2025 retirement, he worked full-time as an educator and administrator of the Schechter Institutes. From 1990 to 2000, he served as the assistant dean and later the dean of the Schechter Institute and Schechter Rabbinical Seminary.

He served as the president of the Schechter Institute from 2000 to 2015, acting as the chief academic officer and chief fundraiser for all the Schechter non-profits, including Tigbur Limudei Yahudut (תגבור לימודי יהדות, 'Strengthening Jewish Studies'), a large secular school system in Israel typically acronymized as "TALI"; Neve Schechter in Tel Aviv; and Midreshet Schechter in Ukraine. In 2015, he became president of Schechter Institutes, Inc., where he continued as the chief fundraiser while also teaching and serving as editor of all Schechter academic publications.

During Golinkin's tenure, the Schechter academic programs grew from serving 35 students to 700 students, with over 2,000 graduates; the TALI school system expanded from 3,000 to 65,000 students (as of 2020); and Midreshet Yerushalaim (later renamed Midreshet Schechter) developed from a single school into a network of camps, schools, and synagogues across Ukraine. Furthermore, he oversaw the Institute's accreditation from the Council for Higher Education in Israel, the doubling of its full-time faculty, and more than tripling of its library holdings. Golinkin led the construction campaign for the new campus of the Schechter Institute in Jerusalem, as well as the Neve Schechter campus in Tel Aviv. Opened in 2012, Neve Schechter now functions as a synagogue, gallery, and Jewish cultural center serving 50,000 people annually. He was also responsible for acquiring and restoring the Midreshet Schechter building in Kyiv.

Golinkin is the founder and director of the Institute of Applied Halakhah at Schechter, which has published over 35 books in Hebrew, English, and other languages. He also directs the Center for Women in Jewish Law at Schechter, which has published five books and two series of multilingual booklets on women in Jewish law. He is the founder and director of the Midrash Project at Schechter, which has published eleven volumes related to Midrash. For twenty years, Golinkin served as the chair of the Va'ad Halakhah (Law Committee) of the Israeli Rabbinical Assembly, responsible for writing responsa and providing halakhic guidance to the Israeli branch of Conservative Judaism (Masorti Judaism).

Golinkin has authored or edited sixty-five books. Forty focus on Halakha, his main area of study, including Responsa of the Va'ad Halakhah of the Rabbinical Assembly of Israel (6 volumes), The Responsa of Professor Louis Ginzberg, The Status of Women in Jewish Law: Responsa (Hebrew and English editions), Responsa in a Moment (5 volumes), Aseh Lekha Rav: Responsa (2 volumes), and Za'akat Dalot: Halakhic Solutions for the Agunot of our Time.

Twenty-five books cover other Jewish studies areas like Talmud, Midrash, and liturgy, including Ginzei Rosh Hashanah, the second Hebrew edition of Legends of the Jews, seven additional volumes of The Midrash Project, the Hebrew edition of As a Driven Leaf by Rabbi Milton Steinberg, The Schechter Haggadah, and The Shoah Scroll (6 editions).

He wrote a column called "Responsa" that appeared in Moment magazine from 1990 to 1996. Between 2000 and 2006, he authored a monthly email column titled Insight Israel on the Schechter Institute's website. He writes an English-language responsa series called Responsa in a Moment and a Hebrew-language series called Aseh Lekha Rav (עֲשֵׂה לְךָ רַב, 'Make [for] Yourself a Teacher'), a reference to the teaching of Joshua ben Perachiah recorded in Pirkei Avot 1:6.

== Awards and recognition ==
In June 2014, Prof. Golinkin was named by The Jerusalem Post as one of the 50 most influential Jews in the world. In May 2019, he received an honorary doctorate from The Jewish Theological Seminary. In 2022, he received the Nefesh B’Nefesh Bonei Zion Prize for his contributions to Israeli society in the field of Education.

== Published works ==
- Responsa of the Va'ad Halakhah of the Rabbinical Assembly of Israel, 6 volumes, primary author and editor (1985-1998)
- Halakhah for Our Time: A Conservative Approach to Jewish Law (many editions in Hebrew, English, Spanish, French, Russian; 1986ff.)
- A Time to be Born and a Time to Die: The Laws of Mourning in Jewish Tradition, by Rabbi Isaac Klein (Hebrew and Russian editions; 1991ff.)
- Be'er Tuvia: From the Writings of Rabbi Theodore Friedman (1991)
- An Index of Conservative Responsa and Practical Halakhic Studies 1917–1990 (1992)
- Breaking New Ground: The Struggle for a Jewish Chaplaincy in Canada by Rabbi S. Gershon Levi (1994)
- The Responsa of Professor Louis Ginzberg (1996)
- Rediscovering the Art of Jewish Prayer (1997)
- Proceedings of the Committee on Jewish Law and Standards 1927–1970, 3 volumes (1997)
- Ginzei Rosh Hashanah: Manuscripts of Bavli Rosh Hashanah from the Cairo Genizah — A Facsimile Edition With a Codicological Introduction (2000)
- Responsa in a Moment: Halakhic Responses to Contemporary Issues, 6 volumes (2000-2024)
- The Jewish Law Watch, 7 Hebrew-English booklets (2000-2003)
- The Status of Women in Jewish Law: Responsa (Hebrew, 2001; expanded English edition, 2012)
- Megillat Hashoah: The Shoah Scroll, 6 editions in 5 languages (2003-2008)
- Insight Israel: The View from Schechter, 2 volumes (2003-2006)
- To Learn and to Teach: Study Booklets Regarding Women and Jewish Law, 5 booklets in 5 languages (2004-2008)
- The High Holy Days, by Rabbi Hayyim Kieval (2004)
- Responsa and Halakhic Studies by Rabbi Isaac Klein, second edition (2005)
- Za'akat Dalot: Halakhic Solutions for the Agunot of our Time by Rabbis Monique Susskind Goldberg and Diana Villa (2006)
- Taking the Plunge: A Practical and Spiritual Guide to the Mikveh by Rabbi Miriam Berkowitz (2007)
- Torah Lishmah: Essays in Jewish Studies in Honor of Prof. Shamma Friedman (2007)
- Jewish Education for What? and other Essays by Walter Ackerman (2008)
- The Schechter Haggadah, with Rabbi Joshua Kulp (2009)
- Legends of the Jews by Louis Ginzberg, second Hebrew edition (2009)
- Ask the Rabbi: Women Rabbis Respond to Modern Halakhic Questions, by Rabbis Monique Susskind Goldberg and Diana Villa (2010)
- The Student Struggle Against the Holocaust, with Rafael Medoff (2010)
- Midrash Hadash Al Hatorah edited by Gila Vachman (2013)
- Midrash Esther Rabbah edited by Joseph Tabori and Arnon Atzmon (2014)
- As a Driven Leaf by Rabbi Milton Steinberg, annotated Hebrew edition (2015)
- Truth and Lovingkindness: A Sourcebook for Spiritual Caregivers from the Midrash and Modern Jewish Thought, by Einat Ramon (Hebrew, 2015; English, 2018)
- Say Something New Each Day by Rabbi Noah Golinkin (2016)
- Kohelet Rabbah (Part I) edited by Menahem Hirshman (2016)
- Minhah L'Yehudah: Julius Theodor and the Redaction of the Aggadic Midrashim of the Land of Israel by Tamar Kadari (2017)
- Aseh Lekha Rav: Responsa, (two Volumes) Hebrew (2019-2024)
- Midrishei Kohelet (Part II), edited by Reuven Kiperwasser (2021)
- Bemidbar Rabbah (Part I), edited by Hananel Mack (2023)
- Hakol Kol Yaacov: Responsa and Halakhic Essays, (2024)

In addition, he has published over 250 articles, responsa and sermons.
