= Mayer Rabinowitz =

- Title: Rabbi, Professor

Religious life
- Religion: Conservative Judaism

Mayer Rabinowitz is a Conservative rabbi and a professor of Talmud at the Jewish Theological Seminary of America. Rabinowitz is a recognized authority on Jewish law who served on the Committee on Jewish Law and Standards of the Rabbinical Assembly for twenty-five years. His halakhic papers have dealt with the ordination of women as rabbis, the observance of Yom Tov Sheini in Israel, the stunning and bolting of animals, homosexuality, and transsexuality. On December 6, 2006, Rabinowitz resigned from the committee after the acceptance of a paper by Rabbis Elliot Dorff, Daniel Nevins and Avram Reisner on homosexual relationships and ordination of homosexual rabbis, while it upheld the biblical prohibition on male intercourse. His seminal works also deal on highly sensitive issues like halakhic questions of SRS and status of transsexuals.
