= Leon Lang =

American rabbi and president of the Rabbinical Assembly

Leon S. Lang (c. 1899-1956) was an American rabbi and former president of the Rabbinical Assembly in 1941.

== Biography ==
Ordained as a rabbi by the Jewish Theological Seminary in 1927, Lang served as the inaugural editor of the quarterly journal of the Rabbinical Assembly, Conservative Judaism. He was "internationally known as chairman of the Chaplaincy Availability board of the Rabbinical Assembly of America" as he collaborated with the U.S. Defense department in recruiting military chaplains and also represented the Jewish Welfare Board to the American armed forces.

Lang began serving as the full-time rabbi of Congregation Sons of Israel in (Nyack, New York) in 1925, two years prior to the recorded date of his ordination. He declared the congregation as committed to "Traditional Judaism", somewhere between Reform and Orthodoxy—a stance that would change later as the congregation joined the United Synagogue of America (later renamed the United Synagogue of Conservative Judaism).

Lang began to serve Oheb Shalom Congregation in Newark, NJ (now in South Orange, NJ) as its Assistant Rabbi in 1927 (serving alongside the Senior Rabbi, Charles I. Hoffman) and continued in his position for 12 years. During this tenure, Lang is credited with developing youth programming and reinvigorating the community's Men's Club.

Lang served as a President of National Young Judea and, in 1950, as the Chairman of the Rabbinical Assembly Fund for the Seminary.
