= Conservative halakha =

Jewish law as understood by Conservative Judaism

Conservative Judaism views Halakha (Jewish law) as normative and binding in contemporary Jewish practice. The Conservative movement applies Jewish law to the full range of Jewish beliefs and practices, including thrice-daily prayer, Shabbat and holidays, marital relations and family purity, conversion, dietary laws (Kashrut), and Jewish medical ethics. Institutionally, the Conservative movement rules on Jewish law both through centralized decision-making bodies—primarily by the Rabbinical Assembly and its Committee on Jewish Law and Standards—and through the congregation-level authority held by rabbis known as mara d'atra. Conservative authorities have produced voluminous Responsa literature, and halakhic decisions continue to be published by individuals and institutions.

Conservative Jewish thinkers take the position that Halakha can and should evolve to meet the changing reality of Jewish life. Conservative Judaism writ large, therefore, argues that traditional Jewish legal codes must be viewed through the lens of academic criticism. As Rabbi Solomon Schechter noted in an 1896 publication by the Jewish Publication Society:

however great the literary value of a code may be, it does not invest it with infallibility, nor does it exempt it from the student or the rabbi who makes use of it from the duty of examining each paragraph on its own merits, and subjecting it to the same rules of interpretation that were always applied to Tradition.

The movement of Conservative Judaism holds that its interpretation of Jewish law as evolving and adaptable aligns with Jewish tradition (mesorah). Conservative Jewish application and interpretation of Jewish law can be compared to those of other contemporary Jewish religious movements, specifically with regard to Halakha and the Talmud.)

== Difference in methodology from Orthodoxy ==
Conservative Judaism relies on a somewhat different Jewish legal methodology than is typical of Orthodoxy. The prominent Conservative rabbi Mordecai Waxman has written that "Reform Judaism has asserted the right of interpretation, but it rejected the authority of legal tradition. Orthodoxy has clung fast to the principle of authority but has rejected the right to significant reinterpretations. The Conservative view is that both are necessary for a living Judaism. Accordingly, Conservative Judaism holds itself bound by the Jewish legal tradition, but asserts the right of its rabbinical body, acting as a whole, to reinterpret and to apply Jewish law."

A major difference between Conservative and Orthodox methodology is the former's frequent use of Takkanot (rabbinic decrees), which is far more prevalent than among the latter.

The Talmud states that in exceptional cases, rabbis have the right to uproot Biblical prohibitions for a variety of reasons; it gives examples of how this was done in practice, e.g., Talmud Bavli, tractate Yevamot 89a-90b, and tractate Nazir 43b.

1. B'shev va'al ta'aseh. Rabbis may rule that a Torah mitzvah should not be performed, e.g., blowing the shofar on Shabbat or blessing the lulav and etrog on Shabbat. These are not done out of fear that one may carry these items from home to a synagogue, thus inadvertently violating a Shabbat melakha. (Yevamot)
2. B'kum v'ase. When there is emergency measure that needs to be taken, one may violate a Torah mitzvah, in order to maintain the Jewish system as a whole. Arnold Goodman writes "The example cited is Elijah offering a sacrifice on Mt. Carmel in order to turn the people back from idolatry. (Yevamot)
3. B'davar she'b'mammon. The principle of Hefker Bet Din Hefker, a rabbinic court has the power to declare an object, or money, ownerless. (Yevamot)
4. A Kohen may violate the Torah mitzvah ordering Kohanim not to bury the dead. The example given in Nazir 43b is that a Kohen may bury his wife, as her own father is dead and cannot bury her. Arnold Goodman writes: "In a famous tosfot, Rabbi Yitzhak explains that by Biblical law, she is not a Met mitzvah because she has other family. Yet since her relatives and family may have abandoned her, the Rabbis regarded her as a Met mitzvah and even though a Bet Din does not have the authority to uproot a Biblical prohibition, in an instance where there is a panim v'taam l'davr, it is universally accepted that there is authority to uproot."

See the discussion by rabbi Arnold Goodman in Solemnizing the Marriage Between a Kohen and a Divorcee p. 2 (bottom) p. 3 (top.) Goodman notes that "Later authorities were reluctant to assume such unilateral authority... Later authorities thus imposed severe limitations on the conditions and situations where it would be appropriate and necessary to uproot.." but then states on p. 3 that "Yet the right to uproot was never completely prohibited. There was often the need for an escape hatch, and the right of rabbinic authorities to do so was articulated by the Rashba as follows: It was not a matter of the sages deciding on their own to uproot a matter of the Torah, but it is one of the mitzvot in the Torah to obey the 'judges in your day,' and anything they see necessary to permit is permissible from the Torah." (Chidushai Rashba, Nedarim, p. 90a)

Conservative Jewish philosophy does not allow the use of popular will to overturn Biblical or rabbinic laws. Like Orthodoxy, Conservative Judaism requires responsa citing a full range of precedential authorities as part of any halakhic decision. Changes in halakha must come about through the halakhic process. For examples of this view, see rabbi David Golinkin's essay "The Whys and Hows of Conservative Halakhah", Elliot N. Dorff's "The Unfolding Tradition" (esp. introduction and chapter 1), Joel Roth "The Halakhic Process" (Chapter 1, but also throughout the entire book).

A significant difference with Orthodoxy is that Conservative rabbis have produced a body of research on the history of halakha, which, in their view, concludes that rabbis in every age have always included ethical concerns as a major part of the halakhic process. They hold that rabbis in practice viewed both halakhah and aggadah as inter-related domains and that one could not be used exclusively without the other. See Roth's "The Halakhic Process", Louis Jacobs "A Tree of Life", and Robert Gordis "The Dynamics of Judaism: A Study in Jewish Law" (stressed in introduction and chapters 8, 9).

The CJLS has on a number of occasions accepted teshuvot, which include moral and aggadic reasoning alongside and within a strict precedent-based halakhic framework. As such, they sometimes come to conclusions that differ from their Orthodox peers.

The CJLS cites cases in the Talmud in which Biblical laws became inoperative, such as when the Sanhedrin stopped meeting at its seat in the Temple in Jerusalem where it was required to meet in order to administer capital punishment and the abolition of such practices as the rite of Sotah (the ordeal of a suspected adulteress) and the breaking of the heifer's neck in a case of suspected murder as precedents for refusing to administer Biblically mandated procedures on moral grounds.

== Legal and literary sources ==
As classified by Menachem Elon's Ha-Mishpat Ha-Ivri, the legal sources of Jewish law include Torah interpretation, legislation, and custom (minhag). The Conservative movement utilizes these legal sources as found in both pre-modern and Orthodox Jewish law, though it does not recognize the authority of Reform Jewish responsa.

Through its own deliberations, Conservative Judaism modifies or adds to pre-modern and Orthodox halakha through several literary forms, primarily responsa. Such Conservative responsa may be given official force within Conservative Judaism through the Committee on Jewish Law and Standards (CJLS) of the Rabbinical Assembly. CJLS decisions may also result in a legislative decree or takkanah. Besides responsa and takkanah, the CJLS creates several other literary sources. For instance, the CJLS approved an "Organ and Tissue Donation Card" in 1996. For handling the agunah problem, the CJLS approved a Jewish marriage contract (ketubbah), supplanting a 1935 plan by Louis Epstein, prepared by Saul Lieberman). In addition, Conservative halakha may be found in academic and popular writings, including an effort at codification (Isaac Klein's A Guide to Jewish Religious Practice). Finally, the movement's major liturgical publications—its prayer books and new chumash – constitute de facto halakhic choices about Conservative Jewish religious practice.

In Israel, the Masorti movement recognizes the sources of Conservative halakhah, for the most part. In 1989, the first collection of responsa was published by three Israeli Masorti rabbis in the Va'ad Halacha (Jewish law committee) of the Rabbinical Assembly of Israel. As a matter of custom and rabbinical decision, the Masorti movement differs from its American partner on some matters of Jewish law.

== Conservative Jewish observance of halakha ==
Conservative Judaism holds that both the ethical and ritual mitzvot ("biblical commandments") are normative. Conservative Jews are obligated to observe ritual laws, including the laws of Shabbat (the Jewish Sabbath), kashrut (dietary rules), daily prayer and Jewish holidays, and life-cycle events, as well as guidelines in such matters as medical and social ethics.

A gap exists between what the Conservative movement teaches and what most of its laypeople have incorporated into their daily lives. A primary source of such information about this gap is Jewish Identity and Religious Commitment: The North American Study of Conservative Synagogues and Their Members, 1995–96, edited by Jack Wertheimer (1997). In practice, the majority of Jews affiliated with Conservative synagogues do not observe the Conservative interpretation of halakha.

Conservative Jewish practice, however, is significantly stronger than that found in Reform Judaism, such as following Shabbat, Kashrut, life-cycle events and holiday observances.

There is a substantial committed core of Conservative Jews, consisting of the lay leadership, rabbis, cantors, educators, and those who have graduated from the movement's religious day schools and summer camps, that do take Jewish law very seriously. Recent studies have shown a marked increase in the observance of members of the movement (Silvestein, ibid.)

== Specific decisions in Jewish law ==
This section describes how Conservative beliefs and theory have been applied in practice over the last century. Conservative Judaism began with rabbinical practices similar to those of contemporary Modern Orthodoxy and somewhat laxer observance among its laity. Over the years, specific issues and decisions have resulted in increasing divergence from Orthodoxy. Key differences include:

=== Homosexuality ===
Conservative Judaism has long discussed the issue of homosexuality and whether or not a re-evaluation of the subject is appropriate. The issue had been informally discussed since the 1980s and became a formal issue studied by the CJLS in the early 1990s. The CJLS consistently refused to pass several proposed takkanot concerning the Levitical prohibitions on male-male anal sex as well as other forms of homosexual intimacy. In 1993, the Committee adopted a consensus position reaffirming a blanket prohibition on homosexual conduct while welcoming homosexuals as members.

Arguments over homosexuality were framed as formal halakhic responsa, one of the most prominent by rabbi Bradley Shavit Artson. He argued that homosexuality, as it is now understood today, was not described by the Torah nor understood by traditional rabbis. As such, one would be able to restrict the understanding of the Torah prohibition to cases not being considered today. His views were not accepted. Later, rabbi Elliot N. Dorff used similar arguments in his case for re-evaluating homosexuality. Dorff studied the issue of coercion, arguing that people who were innately homosexual due to biology were not to be regarded as sinning. His early papers on the subject began to gain acceptance among a minority of RA rabbis, but ultimately it was made clear that the CJLS would not accept this argument as sufficient.

Two additional papers, one by rabbi Gordon Tucker and one by rabbis Myron Geller, Robert Fine, and David Fine, went further than Dorff's paper. Tucker's paper stated that it is necessary to expand the definition of the halakhic process, and the Geller, Fine, and Fine paper redefined the corpus of halakha as representing the evolving beliefs and ideals of the Jewish people of a particular time and place as distinct from representing an infallible Divine will. While both papers had the support of at least 6 members, a majority of the CJLS found that both papers represented so extensive a change that they could not be accepted as mere changes of Jewish law. However, each should be regarded as a takkanah that would uproot a Torah prohibition if passed. Under the CJLS rules, once a majority of the committee found a responsum to be a takkanah, accepting it would require a majority of the Committee (13 of 25 votes), while an ordinary responsum could be accepted as a valid alternative with as few as 6 of 25 votes.

On December 6, 2006, the Committee on Jewish Law and Standards adopted opposing responsa on the issue of homosexuality. The CJLS's action permits each congregational rabbi and rabbinical school to decide which responsum to adopt and hence set its own policy on the subject. The adoption of dual responsa represents a straddling of the contemporary societal divide over sexual matters. The responsa was entitled, "Homosexuality, Human Dignity & Halachah: A Combined Responsum For The Committee On Jewish Law And Standards"

In June 2012, the American branch of Conservative Judaism formally approved same-sex marriage ceremonies in a 13–0 vote.

=== Shabbat ===
In the 1950s and 1960s, the Conservative movement permitted limited circumstances regarding driving to a synagogue on Shabbat.

- The CJLS accepted a responsum which holds that if a person rides to the synagogue on Shabbat, with the intention of fulfilling Shabbat mitzvot, and that if no other driving on Shabbat is done, then that person will not be held as being in violation of halakha. The decision about driving was in the nature of an emergency decree, overriding what the authors saw as rabbinic law. The reason was that a tremendous number of American Jews were now living far from synagogues as an unavoidable consequence of modern life, and unless Jews were permitted to drive to the synagogue, then most American Jews would lose their connection to Jewish life ("Responsum on the Sabbath" by rabbis Morris Adler, Jacob B. Agus and Theodore Friedman.)

This teshuvah became somewhat infamous within the observant Conservative Jewish community, and the CJLS was forced to issue a clarification some years later, as the laity came to believe that driving on Shabbat was now generally permitted. (It was not so permitted.) A clarification of this teshuvot was issued in "Travel on the Sabbath", a statement unanimously adopted by the CJLS on 2/17/60.

A vigorous debate on the controversy that this responsa sparked, and how they should be viewed today, arose in the late 1990s and continues today. Modern Conservative views may be found in "Reflections on the Driving Teshuvah" by Avram Hein in the Spring 2004 issue of "Conservative Judaism, along with responses by rabbis David Fine, Susskind Goldberg, Kassel Abelson, and Ismar Schorsch), Conservative Judaism Vol. 56(3), pp. 21–50.

- The CJLS allowed some use of electricity on Shabbat, so long as the use of this electricity did not violate any melakha, Shabbat-prohibited activity. This decision was based on an argument that the nature of electricity more resembled running water in a faucet, which can be turned on and off on Shabbat, than fire, which cannot be ignited on Shabbat. ("Responsum on the Sabbath" by rabbis Morris Adler, Jacob B. Agus, and Theodore Friedman.)
- In 1989 the Conservative movement allowed rabbis to permit videotaping bar and bat mitzvahs on Shabbat, on the grounds that a videotape is not a form of writing (which is prohibited on Shabbat). This permission operates under the restriction that such videotaping is set up before Shabbat and that no Jew operates said equipment during Shabbat.
- The Masorti movements in both Israel and the United Kingdom have rejected the Driving Teshuvah and maintain a general prohibition on driving on Shabbat.

=== The role of women ===
- Early in its history, Conservative Judaism determined that a mechitza separating men and women was not required in services and that women could be called to the Torah if permitted by the synagogue rabbi. Both decisions were based on arguments from Jewish sources.
- The CJLS passed a takkanah that allowed Jewish women to count in the prayer minyan. Throughout 1973 the CJLS debated various responsa on this subject. In August 1973, a vote was taken. Instead of voting for or against a particular responsum, the committee voted on accepting the conclusions of the teshuvot. A motion was passed which stated that "Men and women should be counted equally for a minyan.", with nine in favor and four opposed. According to rabbi David Fine (Women and Minyan, 2002, p. 3), this was because those voting disagreed about the reasoning; no one teshuvah's reasoning was totally satisfactory to all members. Some rabbis agreed with the reasoning but thought that the change was inadvisable because of possible negative effects on the structure of the Jewish family, or the strength of the Conservative movement. (ibid, p. 3)

Rabbi Philip Sigal and his supporters held that Jewish law did not actually prevent women from being counted in a minyan. (Fine, p.4) Sigal holds that the Mishneh Torah and Shulkhan Arukh do not state that ten males must make up a minyan; rather, these sources only say that ten are required. His views were later disputed by some other Conservative rabbis, most prominently David Feldman. (Woman's Role and Jewish Law in Siegel, ed., Conservative Judaism and Jewish Law, p. 300.) Around this same time, rabbi Sigal later reported that many CJLS rabbis did not agree with the reasoning in his paper, even if they happened to agree with his conclusion. He concluded that counting women in a minyan was justifiable within the halakhic system but could no longer be viewed as a change in minhag; it was a change in halakha as established by precedent, and thus and should be viewed as a takkanah. (Fine, p.4) This is also the view accepted in Fine's 2002 CJLS paper.

- In 1983 a number of Conservative rabbis issued responsa on the same subject, arguing that women can and should be counted in the prayer minyan. These papers were written as part of the process of JTS deciding on whether or not to admit women to its rabbinic and cantorial programs. However, the Chancellor of JTS at the time took this process out of the hands of the CJLS, and made the process an affair of the JTS faculty, a move that caused strong controversy, and several resignations of Talmud faculty from JTS (see Union for Traditional Judaism § Origins). The decision to allow women to become rabbinical and cantorial candidates was then based on a vote of JTS faculty, in principle based on their readings of these responsa and their own understanding of the relevant texts.

The anger generated by this controversy affects JTS to this day. The sensitivity over this issue caused future JTS Chancellors Ismar Schorsch, and then Arnold Eisen to avoid making future halakhic decisions, and insisting that such issues be resolved by the CJLS, e.g., the issue of homosexuality. This was especially apparent as Schorsch was a strong proponent of not changing the movement's views on homosexuality, while Eisen was a proponent of making such changes. Despite their personal views, each felt it would be improper to overrule the CJLS.

- In 2002, long after the Conservative movement had adopted complete de facto egalitarianism, it offered its first responsum on the subject, the Fine responsum, holding that Jewish women as a corporate entity could agree to assume the same obligations as men and be bound by them corporately, without any individual woman having to do so personally.

The CJLS effectively passed a takkanah ruling that women may be counted as witnesses in all areas of Jewish law. This change is viewed as a lifting of a rabbinical prohibition that were rooted in social dynamics. See Myron S. Geller, "Woman is Eligible to Testify"; Susan Grossman, "Edut Nashim k'Edut Anashim: The Testimony of Women is as the Testimony of Men" and Joseph H. Prouser, "On Women Serving as Witnesses–A Dissent".

=== Kashrut – keeping kosher ===
The Conservative movement's understanding of kashrut is generally the same as that within Orthodox Judaism. However, on issues where leniency is possible, its Committee on Jewish Law and Standards consistently allows the lenient views as an acceptable option. For instance, it is permissible to view all gelatin as kosher, milk does not have to be cholov yisrael, and red meat does not have to be glatt.

The one significant difference between Orthodox and conservative interpretations of halakha is that in the 1960s, the CJLS accepted a responsum that stated that American wines, being manufactured automatically rather than "by gentiles", might be viewed as kosher. A 1985 responsum by rabbi Elliot Dorff overturned that ruling.

=== Kohanim ===
Conservative Judaism affirms the belief in a rebuilt Temple in Jerusalem, in which Kohanim may bring offerings. However, Conservative Jews generally reject the idea that animal sacrifices will be a part of these services. The movement has no official position on what will or should occur in a future Temple.

==== Restrictions on marriage ====
In 1968 rabbi Isaac Klein wrote a responsum accepted by the CJLS that allowed a Kohen to marry a convert if the Kohen, after counseling on the religious issues involved, agreed to stop performing priestly functions and understood that offspring of the marriage would not be regarded as Kohanim. (Responsa and Halakhic Studies, Ktav.) The reasoning behind this responsum was that:

- Since the Temple in Jerusalem is no longer extant, kohanim are no longer needed to perform Temple services in a state of ritual purity.
- The priestly status of most modern-day kohanim is doubtful at best. The frequent persecutions and expulsions of Jews throughout history have caused kohanim to lose track of their genealogy.
- Because the intermarriage crisis among American Jewry is an extreme situation, the Conservative movement feels it must support the decision of two Jews to marry. The responsum puts this forth as an emergency situation. Any marriage between two Jews should be encouraged.

As the rate of intermarriage among American Jews increased, the issue was revisited again in the 1990s. In 1996 the CJLS issued two emergency takkanot, effectively lifting biblical restrictions on Kohen marriages. This was done given the high rate of intermarriage in the USA and the need to keep two Jews who marry within the Jewish community. Rabbi Goodman details the Talmud's ruling that rabbis have the right to uproot Biblical prohibitions in three cases, and examples of how this was done in practice (Solemnizing the Marriage Between a Kohen and a Divorcee) p. 2 (bottom) p. 3 (top)

Goodman offers sources that admit that "Later authorities were reluctant to assume such unilateral authority... Later authorities thus imposed severe limitations on the conditions and situations where it would be appropriate and necessary to uproot.." but then gives sources that state, "Yet the right to uproot was never completely prohibited. There was often the need for an escape hatch, and the right of Rabbinic authorities to do so was articulated by the Rashba..." (p.3)

Goodman's paper argues that the high rate of intermarriage and need to keep married Jews in the Jewish community meets traditional rabbinic standards for such actions, and notes that "[s]hould the current rate of intermarriage be reversed, a future Law Committee may well decide to review this issue. At this time, however, we face a crisis of such proportion that we dare not, in good conscience, stand between the marriage of two Jews whose union as forbidden by virtue of his being a Kohen and she a divorcee. Our steadfast refusal to solemnize their marriage, or even to agree to do this only after seeking to dissuade them, may well lead the couple to be married either in a civil ceremony or in a ceremony without full chuppah and kiddushin. ..." (p.4)

Arnold M. Goodman, "Solemnizing the Marriage Between a Kohen and a Divorcee" EH 6:1.1996
Arnold M. Goodman, "Solemnizing the Marriage Between a Kohen and a Convert" EH 6:8.1996

Unlike the Klein responsum, which, like the Orthodox view, regarded kohanim in and offspring of prohibited marriages as disqualified from performing priestly functions or receiving priestly honors and benefits, the Takkanah held that they are to be regarded as Kohanim in good standing.

=== Giving Kohanim precedence in reading from the Torah ===
The CJLS accepted a responsum concluding that synagogues are not required to call a Kohen to the first aliyah (reading) at a Torah reading, although traditionalist synagogues may choose to continue to do so out of custom.

=== Priestly functions ===
The CJLS has also determined that a Bat-Kohen (daughter of a Kohen) can perform priestly functions, including the Pidyon HaBen ceremony and the Priestly Blessing.

=== Mamzerut ===
The CJLS issued a ruling, which, while not abolishing the Torah category of mamzerut (children born of an incestuous or adulterous union), effectively ended the category's application to Conservative Judaism. The CJLS accepted a responsum that instructs Conservative rabbis to refuse to accept evidence on this subject, thus preventing anyone from being declared a mamzer by a Conservative rabbi. The responsum explained that its approach was based on "morality... of our tradition":

We cannot conceive of God sanctioning undeserved suffering… When a law of Torah conflicts with morality, when the law is 'unpleasant', we are committed to find a way to address the problem… We are willing to do explicitly what was largely implicit in the past, namely, to make changes when needed on moral grounds. It is our desire to strengthen Torah that forces us to recognize, explicitly the overriding importance of morality, a morality which we learn from the larger, unfolding narrative of our tradition

Rabbi Elie Kaplan Spitz, an esteemed halakhic authority, created a responsum effectively making the Biblical category of mamzerut (bastardy) inoperative, he writes how the "morality which we learn through the unfolding narrative of our tradition" can override traditional understandings of Jewish law.

Orthodox Jewish approaches had recognized the difficulty of maintaining such a category under circumstances where it has become common to divorce civilly and remarry without obtaining a Jewish get (bill of divorce). Orthodoxy thus devised strict rules of evidence rendering it all but impossible to prove the existence of such cases but had kept the category as a theoretical possibility and enforced it in a very small number of controversial modern cases. In declaring its willingness to "do explicitly what was largely implicit in the past" and get rid of the applicability of the category entirely, the CJLS expressly declared that it did not consider a classical rabbinic understanding of this subject to be "the final word" regarding the Divine Will, and that "Aggadah", its evolving conception of morality, can and should override Biblical injunctions when the two come into conflict:

While Conservative Judaism would affirm that the Torah is Divine in its origin, the revelation at Sinai is seen as the beginning of a relationship and not the final word. Interpretation is understood as our communal attempt to understand the will of a compassionate Divine partner. As we mature, we are able to understand God's will for us more clearly. If a law appears unconscionable, we would say that the shortcoming is either our previous understanding or that circumstances have so changed that the rule no longer meets its intended result...The Conservative movement maintains that the purpose of the law in the first place is largely to concretize moral values, and so the specific form of the law can and should be changed if it is not effectively doing that. In other words, the Aggadah should control the halakha.

When a law of Torah conflicts with morality, when the law is 'unpleasant', we are committed to finding a way to address the problem. As a halakhic movement, we look to precedent to find the tools with which to shape the Torah. For the most part, we rely on the strategies of old. At the same time, we are willing to do explicitly what was largely implicit in the past, namely, to make changes on moral grounds.

=== Niddah, family purity and family holiness ===
On December 6, 2006, the Committee on Jewish Law and Standards adopted three responsa on the subject of Niddah.". Two responsa were the majority opinions, one by rabbi Susan Grossman and one by rabbi Avram Reisner, the other responsum was the minority opinion, written by rabbi Miriam Berkowitz. All three responsa held that Conservative Judaism requires women and their sexual partners to abstain from sexual relations for a period of time during and following the woman's menstrual period, and regards this requirement as a Biblical commandment. Two of the three responsa, however, adapted positions more permissive on certain details than required in Orthodox Judaism. These details included:

- Contact between spouses during Niddah. The Grossman and Berkowitz responsa dropped a rabbinic prohibition requiring spouses to completely refrain from touching each other during niddah and permitted nonsexual contact. The Reisner responsum maintained the prohibition on physical contact.
- The duration of the Niddah period. The Grossman and Reisner responsa permitted counting 7 days from the start of menstruation rather than the end. The Berkowitz's responsum required counting 7 days from the end of menstruation but dropped a minimum menstrual period requirement.
- The basis for Niddah. The Grossman and Berkowitz responsum held that the concepts of ritual purity and ritual impurity do not apply in the absence of a Temple in Jerusalem and hence are inapplicable to the contemporary context. They suggested that Conservative Judaism develop a new theological foundation for the practice and suggested renaming it "family holiness" rather than "family purity" to reflect its modern understanding as founded on concepts of holiness rather than "purity". The Reisner responsum maintained that the Biblical concepts of ritual purity and ritual impurity continue to apply in contemporary times and are binding on Conservative Judaism.

== Debate over halakhic foundations ==
There has recently been a debate within Conservative Judaism as to whether and to what extent the movement should continue to base, or claim to base, its practices on halakha. In the keynote address to the December 2005 Biennial convention, JTS philosophy professor Neil Gillman urged Conservative Judaism to "abandon its claim that we are a halakhic movement", which he called "irrelevant to the vast majority of our laypeople".

This speech was strongly criticized. Rabbi David Golinkin, head of the Schechter Institute in Jerusalem, for example, commented that "If the Conservative movement abandons its claim that it is a halakhic movement, it really has no reason to exist."

== Differences from Orthodox theology ==
Both Conservative Judaism and Orthodox Judaism view rabbinic decrees and interpretations as open to some re-evaluation. However, whereas according to the Thirteen Principles of Faith of Orthodox Judaism, the halakha contains a core reflecting a direct Divine revelation that represents God's final and unalterable word to the Jewish people on these matters, Conservative Judaism does not necessarily consider portions of the halakha, and even Biblical law, as a direct record of Divine revelation. The CJLS has written that the Torah represents merely "the beginning of a relationship" rather than a final word and can be superseded by new understanding and new circumstances "as we mature".

This more liberal approach to revelation has resulted in a view that Conservative Judaism's rabbinate can overrule Biblical as well as rabbinic law believed to be inconsistent with modern requirements. The CJLS has issued a number of rabbinic decrees, or takkanot (plural of takkanah), that lift biblically-derived prohibitions – prohibitions which Orthodox Judaism universally regards as sacrosanct.

Examples of such Conservative decrees are:

- a 1961 decree permitting driving to synagogue on Shabbat, overriding the Biblical injunction on the use of fire on Shabbat (based on the rejection of the view that driving equates with making fire.) Responsum on the Sabbath by rabbis Morris Adler, Jacob Argus, and Theodore Friedman.
- a 1998 decree permitting Kohanim to marry divorced women without losing the privileges of Kohen status
- a 2000 decree abolishing investigations into Mamzer status

Despite these decrees, Conservative Judaism's theories of halakha incorporate a broad spectrum of views, including Orthodox views on some issues.

== Bibliography ==
- Adler, Morris; Agus, Jacob; and Friedman, Theodore. "Responsum on the Sabbath" in Proceedings of the Rabbinical Assembly 14 (1950)
- Bokser, Ben Zion. "The Sabbath Halachah – Travel and Use of Electricity" in Proceedings of the Rabbinical Assembly 14 (1950)
- Dorff, Elliot N. To Do the Right and the Good: A Jewish Approach to Modern Social Ethics, 2002
- Feldman, David. Marital Relations, Birth Control and Abortion in Jewish Law, 1968
- Gold, Michael. And Hannah Wept: Infertility, Adoption, and the Jewish Couple JPS, 1988
- Gordis, Robert. The Dynamics of Judaism: A Study in Jewish Law, 1990
- Harlow, Jules, ed. The Rabbi's Manual, New York (1965)
- Novak, David. Halakhah in a Theological Dimension, 1985
- Roth, Joel. the Halakhic Process: A Systemic Analysis, NY:JTSA, 1986
- Waxman, Meyer. Handbook on Judaism, 1947
- Waxman, Mordechai, ed. Tradition and Change New York: Burning Bush Press, 1958
- Rabbinical Assembly website, section on Contemporary Halakha, teshuvot published online.

Contemporary Halakha: Rabbinical Assembly

- Responsa 1991-2000 by the Committee on Jewish Law and Standards of the Rabbinical Assembly.
- "Responsa in a Moment: Halakhic Responses to Contemporary Issues", Rabbi David Golinkin, The Institute of Applied Halakhah at the Schechter Institute of Jewish Studies, Jerusalem, Israel, 2000
- "Life & Death Responsibilities in Jewish Biomedical Ethics", Ed. Rabbi Aaron L. Mackler, Jewish Theological Seminary of America, 2000
- "Proceedings of the Committee on Jewish Law and Standards of the Conservative Movement 1980 - 1985", The Rabbinical Assembly, 1998
- "Proceedings of the Committee on Jewish Law and Standards of the Conservative Movement 1986 - 1990" The Rabbinical Assembly, 2001.
- "The Ordination of Women as Rabbis: Studies and Responsa", Simon Greenberg, JTS, 1988.
- "Proceedings of the Committee on Jewish Law and Standards of the Conservative Movement 1927-1970", 3 Volume set, Ed. David Golinkin, The Rabbinical Assembly, 1997.
- "Responsa and Halakhic Studies", Isaac Klein, Ktav, 1975
- "The Responsa of Professor Louis Ginzberg" Ed. David Golinkin, The Jewish Theological Seminary of America, 1996
- "Responsa of the Va'ad Halakhah of the Rabbinical Assembly of Israel", David Golinkin, The Schechter Institute of Jewish Studies.
