= Martin Cohen =

Martin Cohen may refer to:

- Martin Cohen (soccer) (born 1952), South African footballer who played for the Los Angeles Aztecs
- Martin Cohen (philosopher) (born 1964), author of several popular books in philosophy, philosophy of science and political philosophy
- Martin Samuel Cohen, rabbi of the Shelter Rock Jewish Center in Roslyn, New York
- Martin Cohen (entrepreneur), founder of Latin Percussion in New York
