= Boaz Cohen =

Personal life
- Born: February 26, 1899 Bridgeport, Connecticut, U.S.
- Died: December 11, 1968 (aged 69) New York City, New York, U.S.

Religious life
- Religion: Judaism

Boaz Cohen (1899–1968) was a leading American scholar of Talmud, a legal decisor (posek), and a professor at the Jewish Theological Seminary of America.

== Biography ==
Cohen was born and educated in Bridgeport, Connecticut. He was ordained as a rabbi at the Jewish Theological Seminary of America (JTS) in 1924. Following his ordination, he was appointed Assistant Librarian of JTS. In 1925, he was appointed an instructor of Talmud, and went on to serve on the JTS faculty for four decades. In 1927, he received his Ph.D. from Columbia University. During his career he published extensively on the Talmud and Jewish law, while also authoring many comparative studies between Jewish law and other legal systems. Many of those studies were published in a collection titled Jewish and Roman Law (New York, 1966).

Cohen also served as chair of the Committee on Jewish Law of the Rabbinical Assembly, and he issued thousands of legal rulings.
