= Conservative Judaism (journal) =

Religious periodical

Conservative Judaism was a peer-reviewed scholarly journal published by the Rabbinical Assembly and the Jewish Theological Seminary of America from 1945 until 2014.

== History ==
The journal was founded in 1945 under the editorship of Rabbi Leon S. Lang as a publication of the Rabbinical Assembly (RA). In 1968, the journal became a joint project of the RA and the Jewish Theological Seminary. According to Pamela Nadell, "the quarterly was designed for the elite--Conservative leaders and readers learned in Judaica," and it "remained influential chiefly among the leadership of the Conservative movement."

== Leadership ==
=== Editors ===
Its editors were:

- Leon S. Lang, 1945–1952
- Samuel Dresner, 1955–1964
- Jack Riemer, 1964–1965
- S. Gershon Levi, 1965–1969
- Mordecai Waxman, 1969–1974
- Stephen C. Lerner, 1974–1977
- Myron Fenster, 1977–1979
- Arthur A. Chiel, 1979–1980
- Harold S. Kushner, 1980–1984
- David Wolf Silverman, 1984–1989
- Shamai Kanter, 1989–1993
- Benjamin Edidin Scolnic, 1993–2000
- Martin Samuel Cohen, 2000-2014
- Benjamin Kramer, 2014

=== Editorial board members ===
- Jerome Abrams (1967)
- Jacob Agus (1951-1952)
- David Aronson (1960)
- J. Leonard Azneer (1951)
- Ephraim Bennett (1951-1952)
- Sidney Bogner (1951)
- Eli A. Bohnen (1967)
- Ben Zion Bokser (1948, 1951, 1960)
- Alexander Burnstein (1945-1951)
- Gershon Chertoff (1951-1952)
- Seymour J. Cohen (1951)
- Alan Cooper
- David G. Dalin (historian)
- Samuel Dresner (1967)
- Jessica Feingold (1967)
- Myron Fenster (1967)
- Theodore Friedman (1948)
- Neil Gillman (theologian)
- Judah Goldin (1951)
- Robert Gordis (biblical scholar) (1948)
- Philip Graubart (1951)
- Simon Greenberg (former vice-chancellor of the Jewish Theological Seminary of America) (1948)
- Judith Hauptman (Talmudist)
- Arthur Hertzberg (1948-1951)
- Max Kadushin (scholar of rabbinics) (1948)
- Abraham Karp (1960)
- Wolfe Kelman (1967)
- Leon Liebreich (1951)
- Philip Kieval (1951)
- Alfred Kolatch (1951)
- Myer S. Kripke (1948)
- Morris B. Margolies (1951)
- A. Elihu Michelson (1952)
- Herbert Parzen (1951-1952)
- Jack Riemer (1967)
- Henry Moses Rosenthal (1948)
- Jack Wertheimer (historian)
- Edward T. Sandrow (1948)
- Joseph Sarachek (1951)
- Howard Singer (1951)
- Ira F. Stone (Musar scholar)
- Seymour Siegel (1967)
- Ralph Simon (1951)
- David Silverman (1967)
- Max Weine (1951-1952)
- Joseph Wise (1951)

=== Editorial Council ===
- Max Arzt (1945-1948)
- Herman Abramowitz (1945)
- Mortimer J. Cohen (1945-1948)
- Solomon Goldman (1945-1948)
- Israel Goldstein (1945-1948)
- Solomon Grayzel (1945-1948)
- Israel H. Levinthal (1945-1948)
- Louis M. Levitsky (1945-1948)
