= Aaron L. Mackler =

American rabbi

Aaron L. Mackler is associate professor of theology at Duquesne University in Pittsburgh, Pennsylvania, and an ordained Conservative Rabbi. He is an author in the fields of bioethics and Jewish law. He was editor of Life and Death Responsibilities in Jewish Biomedical Ethics and authored Introduction to Jewish and Catholic Bioethics, part of the Georgetown Press Moral Traditions series.

Mackler served on the Committee on Jewish Law and Standards of the Conservative movement as the Medical Ethics Subcommittee chair, and has written and edited numerous responsa. Mackler's work has been cited for the New York State Task Force. He wrote a book published under Georgetown University press entitled "An Introduction to Jewish and Catholic Bioethics: A Comparative Analysis."

== Education ==
Mackler received his B.A. from Yale University in Religious Studies and Biochemistry in 1980. At the Hebrew University, Jerusalem, Israel he pursued Graduate Studies in Jewish philosophy, Bible, and Midrash. From the Jewish Theological Seminary of America, New York, NY in 1985 he received and M.A. and Rabbinic ordination. In 1992, he was awarded a Ph.D. in philosophy from Georgetown University, Washington, DC. Mackler's dissertation was entitled "Cases and Judgments in Ethical Reasoning: An Appraisal of Contemporary Casuistry and Holistic Model for the Mutual Support of Norms and Case Judgments”.

== Publications ==
- Responsa 1991-2000: The Committee on Jewish Law and Standards, 2001, The Rabbinical Assembly
- Life & Death Responsibilities in Jewish Biomedical Ethics, Aaron L. Mackler, JTS, 2000
