= Benjamin Scolnic =

American rabbi, author, and scholar

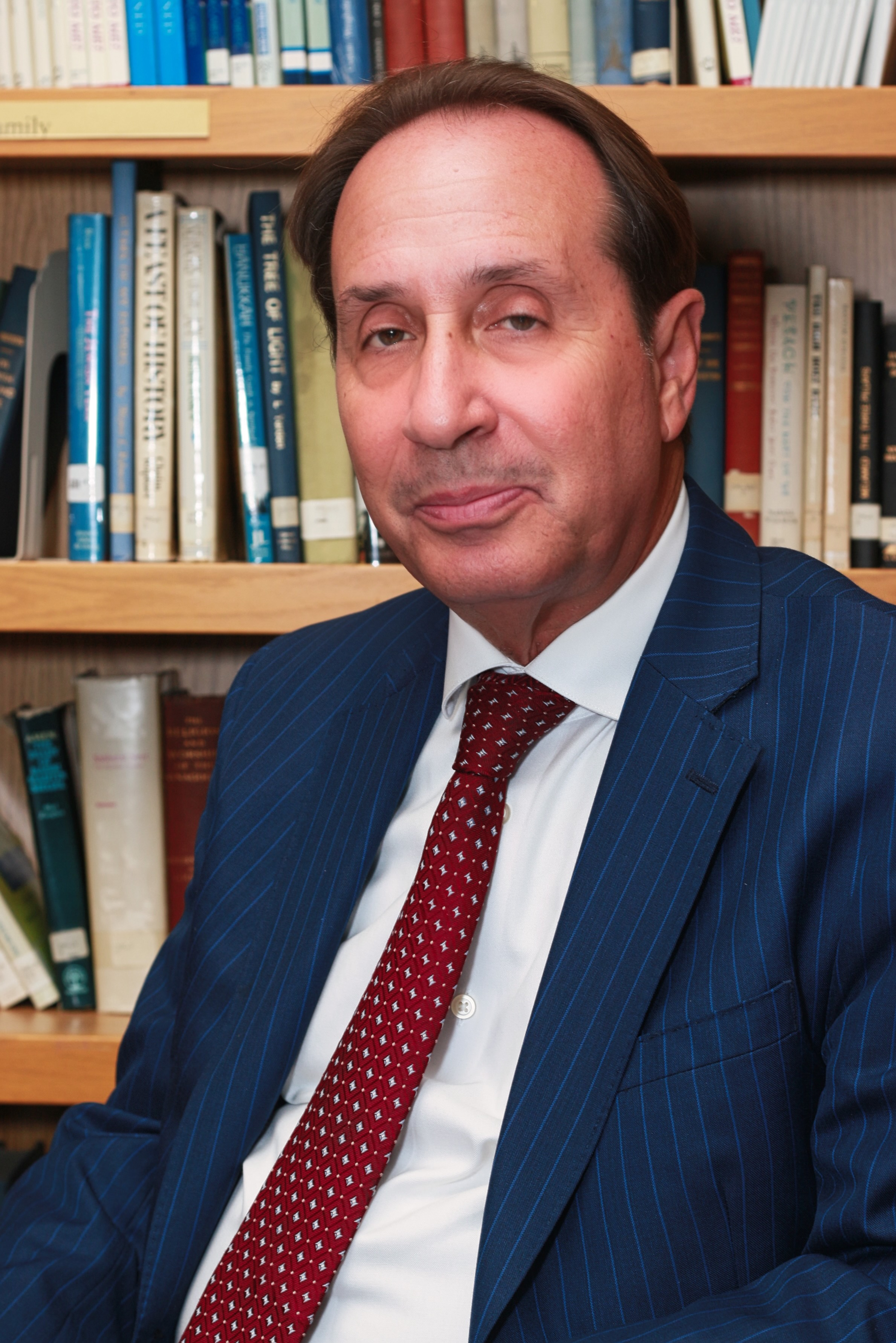
Benjamin Scolnic

Benjamin Edidin Scolnic (born October 28, 1953) is an American rabbi, author, and scholar. He has served as the spiritual leader of Temple Beth Sholom in Hamden, Connecticut, since 1983. Scolnic is a prolific author of works concerning the Hebrew Bible, the Maccabean period, and Hellenistic history.

== Education ==
Scolnic was educated at Columbia University and the Jewish Theological Seminary of America (JTS). He earned master's degrees from both institutions before his rabbinic ordination in 1979. He later received his Ph.D. from JTS, becoming the first person in the history of the JTS Graduate School to earn a doctorate in Bible. His doctoral thesis was subsequently published as Theme and Context in Biblical Lists.

== Career ==
=== Rabbinic and community leadership ===
Since 1983, Scolnic has led Temple Beth Sholom in Hamden, Connecticut. In addition to his pulpit duties, he served as the editor of the journal Conservative Judaism from 1993 to 2000. He also hosted a series of The Eternal Light radio shows produced by JTS.

=== Academic and editorial work ===
Scolnic has held academic appointments at the Jewish Theological Seminary, Yale University, the University of Connecticut, and Southern Connecticut State University, where he has been an adjunct professor for over 20 years.

He has contributed numerous articles to peer-reviewed journals, including Vetus Testamentum, Journal of Biblical Literature, Zeitschrift für die Alttestamentliche Wissenschaft (ZAW), Byzantion, and The Bible Translator. He is also a frequent contributor to the Jewish Bible Quarterly.

Since 2021, he has co-hosted the Seleukid Lecture Series with Altay Coşkun and serves as the editor for the book series Seleukid Perspectives.

== In popular culture ==
Scolnic served as the inspiration for one of the rabbinical detectives in Jacob M. Appel's murder mystery novel, Wedding Wipeout (2013).

== Published works ==
Scolnic is the author or editor of twelve books and hundreds of articles on biblical scholarship, liturgy, and Hellenistic history.

=== Scholarly books ===
- Theme and Context in Biblical Lists (1995)
- Chronology and Papponymy: A List of the Judean High Priests of the Persian Period (1999)
- Alcimus, Enemy of the Maccabees (2004)
- If the Egyptians Drowned in the Red Sea, Where are Pharaoh's Chariots? (2005)
- Conservative Judaism and the Faces of God's Words (2006)
- Thy Brother's Blood: The Maccabees and Dynastic Morality in the Hellenistic World (2007)
- Judaism Defined: Mattathias and the Destiny of His People (2010)
- The Seleukids at War: Recruitment, Composition, and Organization (2024), Volume Editor

=== Sermons and essays ===
- Are You Talking to Me? (2001)
- Shoes for the Road: Thoughts for Living in a Troubled Time (2003)
- Unfinished Business (2006)
- I'm Becoming What I'm Becoming (2008)
- Hayom: Judaism and the Meaning of Today (2012)
