= Ben-Zion Bokser =

American Rabbi

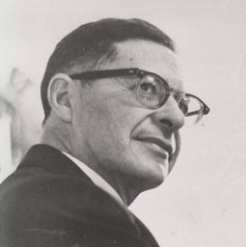
- Born: July 4, 1907; Liuboml, Poland
- Died: January 30, 1984 (aged 76); New York, New York
- Education: City College of New York; Columbia University
- Scientific career
- Fields: Religious Studies & Political Science
- Workplaces: Queens College; Jewish Theological Seminary of America; Hebrew University of Jerusalem

Ben-Zion Bokser (July 4, 1907 – January 30, 1984) was a major Conservative rabbi in the United States.

== Biography ==
Bokser was born in Liuboml, Poland (now Ukraine). He immigrated to the United States at the age of 13 in 1920. He attended City College of New York (BA, 1928) and Rabbi Isaac Elhanan Theological Seminary, followed by the Jewish Theological Seminary of America (ordained, 1931) and Columbia University (PhD, 1935). He taught for many years as an adjunct professor of political science, Queens College, City University of New York.

His first pulpit was Congregation Beth Israel in Vancouver. He served as the rabbi of Forest Hills Jewish Center in Queens, New York, starting in 1933 and remained in that position for the balance of his career, more than fifty years. He served a two-year period as a United States Army chaplain during World War Two, stationed at Camp Miles Standish in Massachusetts. During World War Two, he organized aid for Jewish soldiers.

Bokser was an advocate of social justice, taking a position in favor of the construction of a housing project for the poor in the middle-class community of Forest Hills. During this episode, called the Forest Hills housing controversy 1966–1972, he was in constant contact with many leading politicians and building developers.

He fought against the death penalty in New York state.

He served as a program editor for the Eternal Light, the Jewish Theological Seminary's radio program; a lecturer on homiletics; and a participant in the Conference on Science, Philosophy and Religion and the Institute for Religious and Social Studies, both seminary-run programs.

Bokser heard Rabbi Abraham Isaac Kook speak in New York in 1924 and became an avid student and great proponent of his teachings. Bokser translated and published a number of Rabbi Kook's writings.

He served as chair of the Committee on Jewish Law and Standards of the Rabbinical Assembly from 1959 to 1960, 1963–1965, and 1980–1984.

Bokser and his wife, Kallia, had two children. His son was the scholar of Rabbinic Judaism, Baruch Bokser. His daughter Miriam Bokser Caravella wrote The Holy Name: Mysticism in Judaism on the universal aspects of Jewish mysticism and similarities with the mysticism of other religions.

== Thought ==
He stressed the rabbinic sages and the Talmud as the source of Judaism. "This is not an uncommon impression and one finds it sometimes among Jews as well as Christians - that Judaism is the religion of the Hebrew Bible. It is, of course, a fallacious impression. ... Judaism is not the religion of the Bible" (Judaism and the Christian Predicament, New York: Alfred A. Knopf, 1967, p. 59).

Similar to Heschel, Bokser affirms revelation and even the special status of Sinai, but revelation is always framed in humans by man. "Man receives a divine communication when the divine spirit rests on him, but man must give form to that communication; He must express it in words, in images and in symbols which will make his message intelligible to other men. Out of this need to give form to the truth that is revealed to him, the prophet places the stamp of his own individuality upon that truth."

Bokser argued that Christian antisemitism had desensitized Germans to the heinous character of Nazi propaganda. However, in the post-war period Christian religious and lay leaders have insisted that Christians must play a role in correcting the problems of the social order. (Judaism and the Christian Predicament)

== Legal decisions ==
Rabbi Bokser was active in the Rabbinical Assembly of America, and was a member of its Committee on Jewish Law and Standards. He served as chair of the committee from 1959 to 1960, 1963–1965, and 1980–1984.

He is most famous for writing the minority report 1951 responsa against driving to synagogue on the Sabbath.

In the same year he permitted a Cohen to marry a divorcee.

His responsum against capital punishment is cited often.

In 1981, he advocated holding bat mitzvah ceremonies for girls on Sabbath morning in the main sanctuary. His synagogue was still traditional to the point that he received a public outcry in the local press and letters to him.

In 1983, he permitted holding funerals in a synagogue.

== Works ==
- Pharisaic Judaism in Transition (1935)
- The Legacy of Maimonides (1950)
- The Wisdom of the Talmud (1951)
- Judaism: Profile of a Faith (Knopf, 1963)
- Selihot Service (United Synagogue of America, 1964)
- Judaism and the Christian Predicament
- Siddur: The Prayer Book (????)
- Jews, Judaism, and the State of Israel (1973)
- Abraham Isaac Kook: The Lights of Penitence, Lights of Holiness: The Moral Principles, Essays, Letters and Poems, translation and introduction by Ben Zion Bokser, from the Classics of Western Spirituality., Paulist Press, Inc., New York / Mahwah, N.J.
- The Essential Writings of Abraham Isaac Kook (Ben Yehuda Press (reprint), 2006) ISBN 0-9769862-3-X

== Awards ==
1964: National Jewish Book Award in the Jewish Thought category for Judaism: Profile of a Faith
