= Martin Samuel Cohen =

Martin Samuel Cohen is rabbi of the Shelter Rock Jewish Center in Roslyn, New York.

== Biography ==
Cohen was educated at the City University of New York and at Jewish Theological Seminary of America, where he was ordained a rabbi and received his Ph.D. in ancient Judaism. His dissertation dealt with the early Jewish mystical work Shiur Komah. At that time he also studied the legal writings of Maimonides together with his friend Rabbi Dr. Zvi Leshem, currently the director of the Gershom Scholem Collection at the National Library of Israel.

He has taught at Hunter College, at the Jewish Theological Seminary of America, at the Institute for Jewish Studies of the University of Heidelberg, and at the University of British Columbia and Vancouver School of Theology. Cohen also served as rabbi at 1986–1999 at Beth Tikvah Congregation in Richmond, British Columbia and from 1999 to 2002 at Congregation Eilat in Mission Viejo, California. In 2002, he became rabbi of the Shelter Rock Jewish Center in Roslyn, New York.

Cohen is the author of academic articles, novels, and books of essays. His publications include Our Haven and Our Strength: The Book of Psalms (Aviv Press, 2003) and The Boy on the Door on the Ox: An Unusual Spiritual Journey Through the Strangest Jewish Texts (Aviv Press). Rabbi Cohen published a Siddur in 2007 called Siddur Tzur Yisrael.

From 1997 to 2000, Cohen was chairman of the Publications Committee of the Rabbinical Assembly, and he then became chair of the editorial board of the quarterly journal Conservative Judaism.

In April 2012, the Rabbinical Assembly published a new guide to Jewish law and practice, The Observant Life: The Wisdom of Conservative Judaism for Contemporary Jews, edited by Rabbi Cohen and Rabbi Michael Katz.
