= Isaac Klein =

Conservative rabbi (1905–1979)

Isaac Klein (September 5, 1905 – January 23, 1979) was a prominent rabbi and halakhic authority within Conservative Judaism.

== Personal life, education, and career ==
Klein was born in the small village of Várpalánka, today part of Mukachevo, in what was then Hungary. He emigrated with his family to the United States in 1921. He earned a BA from City College of New York in 1931. Although nearing ordination at the Yeshiva University's Rabbi Isaac Elchanan Theological Seminary, he transferred to the Jewish Theological Seminary of America (JTSA), where he was ordained in 1934 and received the advanced Jewish legal degree of Hattarat Hora’ah under the great talmudic scholar Rabbi Professor Louis Ginzberg. He was one of only three people, along with Boaz Cohen and Louis Finkelstein, to ever to receive this degree from JTSA. Klein subsequently earned a PhD from Harvard University under the pioneering academic of Judaic studies Harry Wolfson.

He married the former Henriette Levine in 1932 and had three daughters, Hannah, Miriam, and Rivke. Devoted to his family, he dedicated his major work, A Guide to Jewish Religious Practice to his children, sons-in-law and 13 grandchildren listing each by name.

Klein served as rabbi at Kadimoh Congregation in Springfield, Massachusetts from 1934 to 1953; Temple Emanu-El, Buffalo, New York, 1953–1968; Temple Shaarey Zedek, Buffalo, (which was created from the merger of Emanu-El with Temple Beth David in 1968), 1968–1972. He and his wife, who was an educator, founded Jewish day schools in both Springfield and Buffalo.

Despite the difficulties facing a congregational Rabbi raising a family, Klein volunteered for the U.S. Army during World War II as a chaplain. He served over 4 years, rising to the rank of Major and was an advisor to the high commissioner of the Occupation government. He also served on special assignments for Jewish soldiers in the U.S. Army in the 1950s, receiving the simulated rank of Brigadier General for these missions. His experiences in the war are described in his book The Anguish and the Ecstasy of a Jewish Chaplain.

== Role within Conservative Judaism ==
Klein was a leader of the right wing of the Conservative movement. He was president of the Rabbinical Assembly, 1958–1960, and a member of its Committee on Jewish Law and Standards, 1948–1979. He was the author of several books, notably, A Guide to Jewish Religious Practice. One of the outstanding halakhists of the movement, he served as a leading member of the Committee on Jewish Law and Standards from 1948 until his death in 1979.

As a leading authority on halakha he authored many important teshuvot (responsa), many of which were published in his influential "Responsa and Halakhic Studies". From the 1950s to 1970s, he wrote a comprehensive guide to Jewish law that was used to teach halakha at the JTSA. In 1979 he assembled this into A Guide to Jewish Religious Practice, which is used widely by laypeople and rabbis within Conservative Judaism.

== Rabbinic thought ==
The philosophy upon which A Guide to Jewish Religious Practice is written is stated in the foreword: "The premise on which Torah is based is that all aspects of life - leisure no less than business, worship or rites of passage (birth, bar mitzvah, marriage, divorce, death) - are part of the covenant and mandate under which every Jew is to serve God in everything he does. In the eyes of Torah there is, strictly speaking, no such thing as the purely private domain, for even in solitude - be it the privacy of the bath or the unconsciousness of sleep - one has the capacity and the duty to serve God." This message, of life seen in consonance with the dictates of Judaism, permeates many pages of the book. Rabbi Louis Finkelstein, scholar of the JTSA, wrote: "There are those who would think that we have but two alternatives, to reject or to accept the law, but in either case to treat it as a dead letter. Both of these alternatives are repugnant to the whole tradition of Judaism. Jewish law must be preserved but it is subject to interpretation by those who have mastered it, and the interpretation placed upon it by duly authorized masters in every generation must be accepted with as much reverence as those which were given in previous generations."

This understanding of traditional preservation of the law through its continuous interpretation lies at the heart of Klein's extensive study of Jewish law.

Klein's papers are located at the University Archives, State University of New York at Buffalo (see finding aid). The archives include fourteen reels of microfilm. The collection consists of extensive writings by Klein on traditional Jewish practice and law. This includes manuscript material for his books Guide to Jewish Religious Practice (1979), The Ten Commandments in a Changing World (1963), The Anguish and the Ecstasy of a Jewish Chaplain (1974), and his translation of The Code of Maimonides (Mishneh Torah): Book 7, The Book of Agriculture (1979). The collection also contains speeches, sermons, articles, and remarks from the Conservative Jewish viewpoint on subjects such as Jewish medical ethics, dietary laws, adoption, and marriage and divorce. Meeting minutes, annual reports, bulletins, and sermons relating to Klein's rabbinical vocations in Springfield, Massachusetts and Buffalo, New York are also included. The papers contain photographs, wartime letters, and military records of Klein documenting his service in World War II as a director of Jewish religious affairs in Germany.
