= Daniel S. Nevins =

American rabbi

Daniel S. "Danny" Nevins (born March 18, 1966) is an American rabbi affiliated with Conservative Judaism. He has been named Senior Rabbi of the New North London Synagogue in the United Kingdom, starting in July 2026. Rabbi Nevins recently served as Head of School at Golda Och Academy in West Orange, New Jersey. His book of responsa (rabbinic essays), Torah and Technology: Circuits, Cells, and the Sacred Path, was published by Izzun Books in 2024.

From 2007 to 2021, Rabbi Nevins was Dean of the Rabbinical School of the Jewish Theological Seminary of America. Previously, he was the rabbi of Adat Shalom Synagogue in Farmington Hills, Michigan, where he served for 13 years in his first pulpit. He is an authority on halakha and co-authored a 2006 responsum approved by the Conservative Movement's Committee on Jewish Law and Standards which permitted gay marriage and the ordination of queer rabbis within the movement.

== Biography ==
Nevins grew up in River Vale, New Jersey. He attended the Frisch School in Paramus, New Jersey and Yeshivat HaMivtar when it was in Jerusalem (1984–85). In 1989, he graduated magna cum laude from Harvard College with a bachelor's degree in history. He earned a master's degree in Jewish studies from the Jewish Theological Seminary of America in 1991 and was ordained as a rabbi in 1994. Nevins also received a graduate fellowship from the Wexner Foundation.

Nevins served on the Rabbinical Assembly's International Executive Council and is a member of its Committee on Jewish Law and Standards. His responsa address topics such as the participation of blind individuals in Torah services, contemporary criteria for determining death, the use of electricity on Shabbat, gene editing, lab-grown meat, and artificial intelligence. He has worked in collaboration with his father, Michael A. Nevins, MD, on projects related to medical ethics. Alongside Rabbis Elliot N. Dorff and Avram Israel Reisner, Rabbi Nevins co-authored the responsum on "Homosexuality, Human Dignity, and Halakha" in 2006, and a 2012 responsum proposing rituals and documents for same-sex marriage and divorce. His 2024 volume of responsa, Torah and Technology, includes an introduction explaining his theory of halakhah (Jewish law) which refers not only to normative precedents but also to the ethical values inherent in the tradition. It closes with an essay in memory of his mother Phyllis Brower Nevins explaining the traditional expression, "May God comfort you among the other mourners of Zion and Jerusalem."

Nevins has also served as president of the Michigan region of the Rabbinical Assembly, the Farmington Area Interfaith Association, and the Michigan Board of Rabbis. He was a founding board member of The Jean and Samuel Frankel Jewish Academy of Metropolitan Detroit and the Detroit chapter of the National Coalition for Community and Justice. In 2006, Nevins received the Reverend James Lyon's Dove Award from the Dove Institute for promoting interfaith understanding.

Nevins has written on mamzerut, advocating for a halakhic approach that limits its practical implications without abolishing the concept. He aligns this perspective with methodologies used by Rabbi Ovadia Yosef to discredit potential evidence of mamzerut, ensuring most cases encountered by congregational rabbis fall outside its scope.

In a responsum on Torah reading by blind individuals, Nevins concluded that while Torah reading for the congregation requires a sighted reader using a kosher Torah scroll, individuals who are blind may lead other aspects of the service, such as serving as a prayer leader (shaliach tzibbur), chanting the haftarah, or receiving aliyot. He also allowed for the possibility of chanting from a braille text and suggested that future technologies enabling direct reading from the scroll by blind individuals could meet halakhic requirements.

His responsum on brain death argued that Jewish law traditionally relies on respiratory criteria to determine death. Nevins contended that contemporary brain death protocols, particularly the apnea test, align with these criteria. He maintained that patients declared brain dead can be removed from artificial support, and organ donation with family consent is permissible to save lives.

The responsum on homosexuality, co-authored with Rabbis Dorff and Reisner, highlighted the harm caused by requiring queer Jews to be celibate to comply with rabbinic norms. The responsum argued that rabbinic prohibitions could be waived in cases where human dignity is compromised, while the biblical prohibition on male anal sex remains in force. The decision, passed by a 13–12 vote, permitted the ordination of LGBTQ rabbis and cantors and allowed same-sex commitment ceremonies, though not equating them with traditional Jewish marriage (kiddushin). The Rabbinical Assembly continues to define guidelines for such ceremonies under this legal decision.

In May 2005, Nevins led a group of Christian leaders on an interfaith trip that included Pope Benedict XVI's first public audience, Holocaust Memorial Day at Titus's Arch in Rome, and a week-long visit to the State of Israel.

== See also ==
- Conservative Judaism
