= Religion in Israeli schools =

Presence and influence of religion in the educational institutions of Israel

Education in Israel
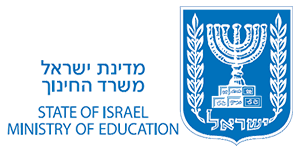

Education Ministry
- Minister of Education: Yoav Kisch

National education budget (2015)
- Budget: ₪45.5 billion

General details
- Primary languages: Hebrew, Arabic
- System type: State and privatized

Literacy (2014)
- Total: 97.8%
- Male: 98.7%
- Female: 95.8%

Enrollment
- Total: 1,445,555
- Primary: 828,732
- Secondary: 259,139
- Post secondary: 357,685

Attainment
- Secondary diploma: 85%
- Post-secondary diploma: 49%

Religion in Israeli schools refers to the presence, influence or instruction of religion and its related subjects at educational institutions in Israel. The Israeli government recognizes schools providing religious education, including publicly-funded or privatized. Education in Israel, at all age levels through tertiary, accommodates religious schools and the teaching of religion, coordinated with the supervised structure and mandated curriculum set by the Israeli Ministry of Education. Religion plays a role in the formal and some informal education of all students in Israel.

== Religious studies in schools ==
Under state education, Israeli families are directed to choose a public school based on their student's primary language as well as their religious affiliation. There are four main Israeli schooling sectors: Arabic-language schools, Haredi Jewish schools, government-managed secular (Hiloni) schools, and government-managed religious schools. Arabic schools primarily comprise Arab teachers, and Hebrew is taught only as a second language. The split in Israeli schools based on ethnic identification has likewise largely led to a divide on specific religious studies. In Jewish Israeli schools, Judaism is seen as a crucial part of the heritage and culture of Israel, and the teaching of Jewish holidays and religious practices is seen as crucial to the understanding of the state in all aspects. The Torah and other Jewish scriptures are studied in a critical manner to enable students to intimately understand the identity of Israel's Jewish-majority population. In 2007, the Public Committee for Bible Education was established to further encourage the teachings of the Bible in order to bridge the growing gap between the secular and religious members of Israeli society.

== Educational disadvantages for Haredim and Arabs ==
There are large divides in educational achievements between the majority of the population of Israel and the subgroups of the population, particularly in the Haredi Jewish and the Arabic-speaking sectors. A 2016 study revealed a 51% completion rate of upper secondary education amongst Haredi Jewish students, compared to 82% amongst Arabic-speaking students and 98% amongst Hebrew-speaking non-Haredi Jewish students. Regional demographics play a large role in educational achievements in the school system. State funding for the Israeli school system comes primarily from the government of Israel as well as local municipalities. Schools in wealthy regions provide on average 10–20 times more funding per student than in less affluent regions. Many schools in the Arabic-language education stream are not funded sufficiently. In 2001, 82% of the Israeli Arab population was made up of Muslims, the majority of whom live on the outskirts of the main cities and in the northern villages that only hold approximately 10% of the Jewish population. Lack of financial means through less industrial development in these villages and declines in agriculture have decreased the opportunities for Arab Muslims to move to more populated and developed areas in Israel. Lack of migration has impaired the ability for young Arabs to attend higher-ranked schools and limited financial means has put more pressure on Arab students to be employed at a younger age. These factors have partly led to the inception of lower rates of success amongst the Muslim community of Israel. The OECD has reported that Israel will need to allocate greater levels of resource disbursements to reach minority populations and demographics in isolated areas. A plan from 2008–2011 provided additional resources for the Arab, Druze and Bedouin communities for teaching and infrastructure.

== Controversy in Israeli schools ==
The uneven distribution of resources and disadvantaged students in different communities in Israel has been studied by the OECD. While Israeli schools back all religious programs, and the Ministry of Education has a set of guidelines, the vast differences in schools has created major divides across the state. Schools vary in size, funding, teacher qualities, and class structures, so that educations between schools are hard to compare and even harder to evaluate. This becomes more complicated when trying to compare students from schools that teach different religious historical backgrounds (i.e. Islam in Arab schools and Judaism in Jewish schools). Furthermore, a recent study found that the rising budget cuts to both secular and religious state schools drove up the number of students who attended private institutions for religious or academic studies, and critics argue that this creates a bigger divide among the wealthier and lower classes, primarily the Muslim and Jewish populations. Critics argue that a bigger wedge between varying religions cause further divide among the different ethnicities within the state, causing long-term tension.
