= Committee on Jewish Law and Standards =

Authority on halakha within Conservative Judaism

- Formation: 1927
- Founder: Rabbinical Assembly

The Committee on Jewish Law and Standards (CJLS) is the central authority on Halakha (Jewish law) within Conservative Judaism; it is one of the most active and widely known committees on the Conservative movement's Rabbinical Assembly. The current chairman of the CJLS is Rabbi Pamela Barmash.

== History ==
The Committee on Jewish Law was created by the Rabbinical Assembly (RA) in 1927. Rabbi Max Drob was the first chair of the committee. The committee was tasked with including representatives from the "Various tendencies" of the Rabbinical Assembly. Of the ten members of the committee, four were to represent a "more conservative tendency," four were to represent "the liberal tendency," and two more were to be chosen by the eight. The more conservative rabbis on the initial committee were Louis Epstein, Louis Finkelstein, Julius Greenstone, and Chairman Drob. The liberals were Mordecai Kaplan, Jacob Kohn, Herman Rubenovitz, and Solomon Goldman. The two additional members were Harry S. Davidowitz and Morris Levine. Drob viewed the creation of the committee as "the first step towards the organization of an American beit din hagadol [supreme court of Jewish law] which will study the problems arising in our new environment and solve them in the spirit of our Torah."

Drob was succeeded by Julius Greenstone, who chaired the committee from 1932 to 1936, and Louis Epstein (1936–1940). Boaz Cohen, a professor at the Jewish Theological Seminary of America, served as chair from 1940 to 1948.

In 1948, the committee was expanded to 25 members and renamed the Committee on Jewish Law and Standards. The new name signaled the Rabbinical Assembly's hopes that Jewish practice should be guided by the highest moral standards along with traditional law. The committee was tasked with "raising the standards of piety, understanding, and participating in Jewish life" among Conservative Jews. In 1986, Amy Eilberg became the first woman appointed to serve on the committee.

After the reconstitution of the committee in 1948, the following rabbis served as chair:

- Morris Adler (1948–1951)
- Theodore Friedman (1951–1954)
- Arthur Neulander (1954–1959)
- Ben Zion Bokser (1959–1960)
- Max Routtenberg (1960–1963)
- Ben Zion Bokser (1963–1965)
- Israel Silverman (1965–1966)
- Benjamin Kreitman (1966–1972)
- S. Gerson Levi (1972–1973)
- Seymour Siegel (1973–1980)
- Ben Zion Bokser (1980–1984)
- Joel Roth (1984–1992)
- Kassel Abelson (1992–2007)
- Elliot Dorff (2007–2019)
- Elliot Dorff and Pamela Barmash (2019-2024)
- Pamela Barmash (2024-present)

Other rabbis who have served on the Committee on Jewish Law and Standards include:

- Morris Adler (1952)
- Jacob Agus (1949–1952, 1954, 1958)
- Aaronson (1932)
- David Aronson (1948–1952, 1954, 1958)
- Max Arzt (1940, 1948, 1951–1952, 1954, 1958, 1958)
- Alexander Basel (1937)
- Noah Bickart (present)
- Aaron Blumenthal (1949–1952, 1954)
- Ben Zion Bokser (1937, 1949–1952, 1954, 1958)
- Alexander Burnstein (1949-1950)
- Paul Chertoff (1937, 1939–1940, 1944, 1948)
- Boaz Cohen (1932, 1937)
- Herman M. Cohen (1948)
- Max D. Davidson (1951–1952, 1954, 1958)
- Max Drob (1932, 1937, 1939–1940, 1944)
- Ira Eisenstein (1949–1952, 1954)
- Louis M. Epstein (1932, 1944, 1948–1949)
- Salamon Faber (1948, 1951–1952, 1954)
- Louis Feinberg (1937, 1939–1940, 1948)
- Louis Finkelstein (1932, 1939–1940, 1952, 1954, 1958)
- Henry Fisher (1948, 1951–1952)
- Theodore Friedman (1948–1950, 1958)
- Israel M. Goldman (1948)
- Solomon Goldman (1948–1950)
- Solomon Goldfarb (1952, 1954, 1958)
- Fishel J. Goldfeder (1948, 1952, 1954, 1958)
- Robert Gordis (1937, 1944, 1948–1952)
- Albert I. Gordon (1952, 1954)
- Harold H. Gordon (1948)
- David Graubart (1948–1950, 1958)
- Simon Greenberg (1937, 1948)
- William P. Greenfeld (1949–1952, 1954)
- Julius H. Greenstone (1932, 1937, 1939–1940, 1948)
- Susan Grossman (1995–2022)
- Herman Hailperin (1949–1952, 1954, 1958)
- Harry Halpern (1940)
- Michael Higger (1939-1940, 1944, 1948–1952)
- Max Kadushin (1939–1940)
- Mordecai M. Kaplan (1932, 1944)
- Harry M. Katzen (1944, 1948)
- Charles E. H. Kauvar (1944, 1948)
- Israel J. Kazis (1949–1951)
- Isaac Klein (1937, 1940, 1944, 1948–1952, 1954)
- Eugene Kohn (1932)
- Benjamin Kreitman (1958)
- Israel Lebendiger (1937, 1939–1940, 1944, 1948)
- Levine (1932)
- Amy Levin (2011-present)
- Louis M. Levitsky (1948)
- S. Gerson Levi (1949–1951)
- Israel H. Levinthal (1944)
- Joshua Lindenberg (1958)
- Hugo Mantel (1944, 1948)
- Solomon H. Metz (1939–1940)
- Abraham E. Millgram (1948)
- Judah Nadich (1954, 1958)
- Arthur H. Neulander (1944, 1948–1952, 1954)
- Daniel S. Nevins (present)
- Simon Noveck (1950)
- David Panitz (1954, 1958)
- Joseph Prouser (2006)
- Jacob Radin (1958)
- James Rosen
- Samuel Rosenblatt (1937, 1939–1940, 1944, 1948)
- Hyman Routtenberg (1949–1951)
- Rubenowitz (1932)
- Ralph Simon (1954, 1958)
- Sanders A. Tofield (1939–1940, 1944, 1949–1951, 1954, 1958)
- Raysh Weiss (present)
- Gershon Winer (1954)

Secretaries of the committee have included the following rabbis:

- Boaz Cohen (1939)
- Philip Sigal (1958)
- Ashira Konigsburg (2013)

Secretaries of the committee have included the following people who were not, at the time, rabbis:

- Gabriel Seed (2010)
- Philip Gibbs (2016)

Ex officio members of the committee have included the following rabbis:

- Aaron H. Blumenthal (1958)
- Isaac Klein (1958)
- Perry Rank (2004–2006)
- William Gershon (2014–2016)
- Philip Scheim (2016–2018)
- Debra Newman Kamin (2018)

Ex officio members of the committee who were not rabbis have included the following:

- Marc Gary

Consultants to the Committee on Jewish Law have included the following rabbis:

- Max Arzt (1949)
- Boaz Cohen (1949-1950)
- Herman Carmel (1954)
- Albert I. Gordon (1949-1950)
- Simon Greenberg (1949-1950)
- Mordecai M. Kaplan (1949-1950)
- Milton Steinberg (1949)

In 1950, Rabbi Milton Steinberg was notably still listed as a consultant to the committee while also being listed as deceased.

In 1949, the Rabbinical Assembly commissioned a "Special Committee on Scope of the Law Committee." This special committee was chaired by Rabbi Israel H. Levinthal and included Rabbis Morris Adler, Ben Zion Bokser, Max D. Davidson, Ira Eisenstein and Theodore Friedman. The special committee lasted through 1950.

== Process ==
Conservative rabbis hold that the boundaries of Jewish law are determined through Halakha, a religious-ethical system of legal precedents. In this system, one may re-interpret or change the law through a formal argument. These arguments are effectively peer-reviewed. When a rabbi proposes a new interpretation of a law, that interpretation is not normative for the Jewish community until it becomes accepted by other committed and observant members in the community. New legal precedents are based on the standard codes of Jewish law, and the responsa literature. The Hebrew term for the responsa is "She'elot U-Teshuvot", literally "Questions and Answers".

There is no formal peer-review process for the entire Jewish community in general, since the Jewish community has no one central body that speaks for all of Judaism. However, within certain Jewish communities, formally organized bodies exist: Each strand of Orthodox Hasidic Judaism has its own rebbe, who is its ultimate decisor of Jewish law. Within Modern Orthodox Judaism, there is no one committee or leader, but Modern Orthodox rabbis generally agree with the views set by consensus by the leaders of the Rabbinical Council of America. Within Conservative Judaism, the Rabbinical Assembly has the Committee on Jewish Law and Standards.

Conservative Judaism teaches that one can use literary and historical analysis to understand how Jewish law has developed and to help them understand how such laws should be understood in our own day. It generally views the laws and customs from the various law codes as the basis for normative Jewish law. Solomon Schechter writes "however great the literary value of a code may be, it does not invest it with infallibility, nor does it exempt it from the student or the Rabbi who makes use of it from the duty of examining each paragraph on its own merits, and subjecting it to the same rules of interpretation that were always applied to Tradition".

In fundamental ways, Orthodox Judaism has a significantly different understanding of how halakha is determined; thus, Orthodox rabbis generally do not respect the decisions of the CJLS as valid or normative.

The CJLS is composed of 25 rabbis (voting members) and five laypeople, who participate in deliberations but do not have a vote. When any six (or more) members vote in favor of a position, that position becomes an official position of the committee. Any particular issue can generate from one to four official positions. When multiple positions are validated, they usually have much common ground.

When more than one position is validated, a congregation's rabbi functions as its mara de-atra (local authority), adopting for their congregation the position they consider most compelling. As Aaron Mackler states:

"The positions authorized by the Committee offer important guidance for Conservative Jews and others. Still, each Conservative rabbi has the authority to make halakhic judgments. Each rabbi formulates decisions about numerous issues not discussed explicitly by the Committee, relying on other halakhic sources and his or her own judgment. For issues the Committee has addressed, each rabbi may choose among various positions endorsed by the Committee, or may even find a different position best mandated by halakhah."

Gordon Tucker has argued that RA members should give "extraordinary weight" to CJLS decisions, while remaining free to disagree with them:

Because it is a body that seeks to coalesce judgment around particular halakhic opinions, and not simply to give voice to individually held positions, it is right and proper that six members of the CJLS be required to define an authoritative position. Because it is a body that is ultimately here to provide service and guidance to Rabbinical Assembly members, it is also right and proper that authoritative opinions not be categorized by the number of votes they received, and that they not be binding on Rabbinical Assembly members in a coercive sense, but rather only in the sense that we are bound by our covenant to one another to give extraordinary weight to CJLS responsa in reaching our own legal decisions. Should an RA member choose, upon study and consideration, not to follow any CJLS position on a given matter, he or she would thus be unable to claim any authority or backing for that position from the CJLS, a "sanction" which in some circumstances could be substantial, in others not.

While responsa are not enforceable on rabbis, there are a few standards of rabbinic practice that are enforced by the RA. Willful violations of these standards have led to resignations or expulsions from membership of the Rabbinical Assembly (RA). At present, three standards of rabbinic practice have been issued, containing four rules:

1) A complete prohibition on rabbis and cantors to officiate in any way at intermarriages.

2) A complete prohibition against officiating at the remarriage of a Jew whose previous marriage has not been halakhically terminated, whether by a halakhic divorce [get], hafka'at Kiddushin [annulment], or death.

3a) A complete prohibition against taking any action that would intimate that native Jewishness can be confirmed in any way but matrilineal descent.

3b) A complete prohibition against supervising a conversion to Judaism that does not include circumcision for males, and immersion in a Mikvah for both males and females.

== Responsa ==
A separate article exists on Conservative responsa, the body of responsa created by Conservative rabbis (primarily by the CJLS.)

== Difference in methodology from Orthodoxy ==
A key practical difference between Conservative and Orthodox approaches to halakhah is that Conservative Judaism holds that rabbis in our day and age are empowered to issue takkanot (decrees) modifying Biblical prohibitions, when perceived to be necessary.

The Conservative position is that the Talmud states that in exceptional cases, rabbis have the right to uproot Biblical prohibitions for a variety of reasons; it gives examples of how this was done in practice, e.g., Talmud Bavli, tractate Yevamot 89a-90b, and tractate Nazir 43a. Rabbi Arnold Goodman, in Solemnizing the Marriage Between a Kohen and a Divorcee, notes that

Later authorities were reluctant to assume such unilateral authority... Later authorities thus imposed severe limitations on the conditions and situations where it would be appropriate and necessary to uproot.. Yet the right to uproot was never completely prohibited. There was often the need for an escape hatch, and the right of Rabbinic authorities to do so was articulated by the Rashba as follows: It was not a matter of the sages deciding on their own to uproot a matter of the Torah, but it is one of the mitzvot in the Torah to obey the 'judges in your day' and anything they see necessary to permit is permissible from the Torah. —Chidushai Rashba, Nedarim, p. 90b

Conservative Jewish philosophy does not allow the use of popular will to overturn Biblical or rabbinic laws. Conservative Judaism requires responsa citing a full range of precedential authorities as part of any halakhic decision. Changes in halakhah must come about through the halakhic process. Examples of this view include Rabbi David Golinkin's essay "The Whys and Hows of Conservative Halakhah", Elliot N. Dorff's "The Unfolding Tradition", and Rabbi Joel Roth's "The Halakhic Process".

The CJLS has, on several occasions, accepted teshuvot, which include moral and aggadic reasoning alongside and within a precedent-based halakhic framework. As such, they often reach conclusions that differ from those of their Orthodox peers.

=== Takkanot: Significant legislative changes in Jewish law ===
The CJLS has passed takkanot which significantly change Jewish law. The following is a list of such takkanot; note that the reasoning behind these changes is not explained in depth here.

- Driving to synagogue on Shabbat. The CJLS accepted a responsa which holds that if a person rides to synagogue on Shabbat with the intention of fulfilling various Shabbat mitzvot, and if no other driving on Shabbat is done, then that person will not be held as violating halakhah. ("Responsum on the Sabbath" by Rabbis Morris Adler, Jacob B. Agus and Theodore Friedman.)
- The CJLS issued emergency takkanot, lifting biblical restrictions on Kohen marriages. These responsa argue that the high rate of intermarriage and need to keep married Jews in the Jewish community meets traditional rabbinic standards for such actions, and notes "Should the current rate of intermarriage be reversed, a future Law Committee may well decide to review this issue. At this time, however, we face a crisis of such proportion that we dare not, in good conscience, stand between the marriage of two Jews whose union is forbidden by virtue of his being a Kohen and she a divorcee. Our steadfast refusal to solemnize their marriage, or even to agree to do this only after seeking to dissuade them, may well lead the couple to be married either in a civil ceremony or in a ceremony without full chuppah and kiddushin. ..."
- The CJLS effectively passed a takkanah ruling that women may be counted as witnesses in all areas of Jewish law. The CJLS does not view this as a change in Torah law, but rather as lifting a rabbinical prohibition rooted in social dynamics. See Myron S. Geller, "Woman is Eligible to Testify"; Susan Grossman, "Edut Nashim k'Edut Anashim: The Testimony of Women is as the Testimony of Men"; and Joseph H. Prouser, "On Women Serving as Witnesses–A Dissent".
- The CJLS passed a takkanah that allowed Jewish women to participate in the prayer minyan. In August 1973, a motion was passed stating that "Men and women should be counted equally for a minyan," with nine in favor and four opposed.

In other areas, the CJLS did not issue takkanot, but found procedures to follow classical halakhah while maintaining what they view as the highest standards of moral behavior. For instance:

- The CJLS, in declaring that its rabbis would not accept evidence or entertain questions as to the existence of mamzerim, declared that Biblical law represents only the beginning of a relationship with the divine and that in the Conservative movement, biblical law can be overridden on grounds of inconsistency with contemporary morality because "Aggadah controls Halacha".
- In December 2006, a majority vote of the CJLS (13 members for, 12 against) accepted a controversial responsum that allows homosexual Jews to become rabbis and cantors. The responsum was titled "Homosexuality, Human Dignity & Halakhah", and it was written by Rabbis Elliot N. Dorff, Daniel S. Nevins, and Avram I. Reisner. The responsum abolished rabbinic laws restricting homosexual conduct other than male-male anal sex, concluding that the CJLS has authority to do this on the grounds of the talmudic principle of Kavod HaBriyot, which it translated as "human dignity", on the grounds that the existence of such sexual restraints represents an affront to human dignity as modern society perceives it. Four members of the CJLS resigned to protest this decision.
- In December 2006, a majority vote of the CJLS (13 members for) also adopted a responsum titled "Homosexuality Revisited", written by Rabbi Joel Roth, maintaining the traditional prohibitions on homosexual conduct. The Roth responsum maintained that the Dorff responsum was untenable, claiming that virtually all classical authorities hold that the Biblical prohibition extends to a wider range of homosexual conduct. It also claimed that the concept of Kavod HaBriyot, which it translated as "respect" or "honor", permits setting aside rabbinic prohibitions in deference to others' honor, but does not permit setting aside prohibitions set up for God's honor in deference to one's own.
- In 2011, the responsum "The Status of the Heresh [one who is deaf] and of Sign Language" was unanimously passed by the CJLS. This responsa declared that, among other things, "The Committee on Jewish Law and Standards rules that the deaf who communicate via sign language and do not speak are no longer to be considered mentally incapacitated. Jews who are deaf are responsible for observing mitzvot. Our communities, synagogues, schools, and camps must strive to be welcoming and accessible, and inclusive. Sign language may be used in matters of personal status and may be used in rituals. A deaf person called to the Torah who does not speak may recite the berakhot in sign language. A deaf person may serve as a shaliah tzibbur in sign language in a minyan whose medium of communication is sign language.

== Criticisms of the CJLS ==
There exist significant disagreements in the interpretation of Jewish law between all Jewish groups, even different groups within the same denomination (for instance, there are half a dozen large, different Orthodox Jewish rabbinical groups, none of which accepts the rulings of the other as necessarily correct or authoritative.

Rabbi Joel Roth (cited above as one of the two opinions on the issue of homosexuals serving as rabbis) left the CJLS after the ruling on homosexual rabbis. He does not agree with Rabbi David Wolpe, Rabbi of Sinai Temple in Los Angeles and supporter of the ordination of homosexual rabbis, that the Conservative movement is not halakhic, and in fact publicly reaffirmed his commitment to staying in the Conservative movement and in the movement's Rabbinical Assembly. However, he felt that the members of the CJLS were no longer following the parameters of the halakhic system, and as such quit the CJLS.

Of the criticism of the committee are its voting methods. Currently, as stated, a position must garner six votes to be held as legitimatized view. In times past, it was one. This has caused many to claim that the committee is very waved by popular opinion and creates inner fractions instead of attempting to making a conclusive ruling.

When dealing with rulings on Jewish law between entirely different denominations (Orthodox vs. Conservative, Conservative vs. Reform, etc.) it is thus to be expected that significant disagreements can be found.

As well, there is also a more extreme criticism that the committee is a failure in being able to balance modernity and traditional practice. Citing for example the "takana" of driving on Shabbat for the exclusive purpose of going back and forth to synagogue, critics note today few Conservative actually just drive to synagogue (including the Rabbinical and Lay leadership) while some do not drive at all. Meaning that neither those who drive nor decide to refrain completely from driving have any relevancy to the original committee's decision, which in effect just allowed the doing whatever the individual member of the movement wanted to do based on everything but the committee itself. The explanation by many critics that the committee would rather try to please everyone within its broad tent than make a decision that would be considered more correct but in any way controversial (thus the wanting to approve all sides of all controversies.) Also explained as an overemphasis of modern political and philosophical thought over traditional Jewish thought.

== See also ==
- Conservative Judaism
- Conservative Halakha
- Rabbinical Assembly
- Halakha
- Posek
- Vaad
