= Elliot N. Dorff =

American rabbi and scholar

Elliot N. Dorff (born 24 June 1943) is an American Conservative rabbi. He is a visiting professor of law at UCLA School of Law, a distinguished professor of Jewish theology at the American Jewish University (formerly the University of Judaism) in California (where he is also rector), an author, and a bioethicist.

Dorff is recognized as an expert in the philosophy of Conservative Judaism and Jewish bioethics, and he is acknowledged as a leading authority on Halakha (Jewish law) within the Conservative community. Dorff was ordained as a rabbi from the Jewish Theological Seminary of America in 1970. He earned his BA and PhD in philosophy from Columbia University in 1971. He has been awarded four honorary doctoral degrees—from the Jewish Theological Seminary, Gratz College, Hebrew Union College, and American Jewish University—and a Lifetime Achievement Award from the Journal of Law and Religion.

Dorff was the chairman of the Rabbinical Assembly's Committee on Jewish Law and Standards (CJLS), as well as the author of many responsa on various aspects of Jewish law and philosophy.

== Philosophy of religion ==
Among other topics, Dorff is interested in Jewish philosophy, especially epistemology. As a philosopher, Dorff asks about the difference between belief and knowledge. Given the philosophical definition that knowledge differs from belief (knowledge is often defined as a justified, true belief), Dorff's works explicitly analyze epistemological questions. His philosophy of religion, as illustrated especially in his book Knowing God: Jewish Journeys to the Unknowable, stems from the analytic tradition in philosophy, with careful attention to the grounds of justified belief. He claims, however, that the Jewish tradition did not base its belief in God primarily on intellectual activity because Judaism is theistic, believing in a personal God: just as we do not come to know people through creating proofs of their existence, so too that has not been the primary way in which Jews have come to know God. Instead, he writes, to know people we talk with them and do things with them, and the same is true for how we come to know God: We talk to God through prayer; God talks to us through revelation; we do things with God through following God's commandments; and God does things with us by acting in history. In Knowing God there is a chapter on each of those aspects of the interaction that Dorff says gives us knowledge of God.

In his book Conservative Judaism: Our Ancestors to Our Descendants, Dorff creates and then explains a chart of various views of revelation and Jewish law, including the mainstream Orthodox approach, four Conservative approaches, and the Reform approach. In it he describes himself as "Conservative III," according to which revelation holds no content in of itself; rather, God inspired people with His presence by coming into contact with them. In this view the Bible is a human response to our ancestors' encounters with God, and revelation continues each time we study and reinterpret Jewish classical texts.

== Bioethics ==
In the spring of 1993, Dorff served on the ethics committee of Hillary Clinton's Health Care Task Force for her 1993 health care plan, and in March 1997 and May 1999, he, along with other rabbis, testified on behalf of the Jewish tradition on the subjects of human cloning and stem cell research before President Bill Clinton's National Bioethics Advisory Commission. In 1999–2000, he served on the U.S. Surgeon General's Task Force to create a Call to Action for responsible sexual behavior to reduce the spread of sexually transmitted diseases, and between 2000 and 2002 he served on the National Human Resources Protections Advisory Commission, charged with reviewing and revising the federal guidelines on research on human beings. He is now on the California Ethics Advisory Commission for embryonic stem cell research done within the state and his perspective has been sought on this topic at a national level.

Dorff is a fellow of the Hastings Center, a research institution that studies issues in bioethics. His book on Jewish medical ethics is Matters of Life and Death: A Jewish Approach to Modern Medical Ethics.

== Other areas of ethics ==
Dorff has co-edited two anthologies with religion professor Louis E. Newman, formerly of Carleton College and now of Stanford University—namely, Contemporary Jewish Ethics and Morality: A Reader and Contemporary Jewish Theology: A Reader, both published by Oxford University Press. In addition, he has written books on social ethics To Do the Right and the Good, and The Way into Tikkun Olam: (Repairing the World) and personal ethics Love Your Neighbor and Yourself. His books on social ethics include chapters on interfaith relations, pluralism within the Jewish community, poverty, justice, war, and communal forgiveness. His book on personal ethics includes chapters on privacy, sexual ethics, family violence, how we talk to and about each other, parents and children, and hope. He has also co-edited with Emory University Professor Jonathan Crane The Oxford Handbook on Jewish Ethics and Morality.

In addition to these chapters on specific areas of ethics, Dorff has written extensively on issues in ethical theory—in particular, the relationships between religion and ethics and between Jewish law and ethics.

== Jewish law ==
Dorff has written about the theory of Jewish law and has also written rabbinic rulings (teshuvot) on a number of issues in Jewish law. In his book The Unfolding Tradition, he describes and analyzes fifteen theories of Jewish law within the Conservative Movement with comparisons to theories on the right in Orthodoxy and on the left in Reform Judaism and yet further left. He articulates his own theory of Jewish law as a living, organic system in his book For the Love of God and People: A Philosophy of Jewish Law. In addition to describing how he understands Jewish law as being like a human being with a body (=the body of Jewish law, the corpus juris) and soul (=the Covenant between God and the Jewish People), he has specific chapters on the interaction between Jewish law and morality, theology, and custom, followed by some comparisons to the right and left of his approach and some specific examples of his own rabbinic rulings that illustrate his theory.

== Communal activities ==
In Los Angeles, Dorff is a member of the Board of Jewish Family Service and has served as its president (2004–2006). From 2008 to 2016 he was a member of the Board of the Los Angeles Jewish Federation Council, co-chairing its task force on Serving the Vulnerable. Since the 1980s he has been a member of the Ethics Committees of UCLA Medical Center and the Jewish Homes for the Aging. He is co-chairman of the "Priest-Rabbi Dialogue" sponsored by the Los Angeles Archdiocese and the Board of Rabbis of Southern California, and he is the former Treasurer and President and current board member of the Academy of Judaic, Christian, and Islamic Studies. He has been Secretary of the Board of the Faithtrust Institute, dedicated to stopping violence against women and children. He is a past president of three academic societies: The Jewish Law Association, The Jewish Philosophical Association, and the Society for Jewish Ethics and Honorary President of the Jewish Law Association between 2012 and 2016.

== Scholarship ==
Dorff has published fourteen books and over 200 articles on Jewish thought, law, and ethics, and he has edited or co-edited another fourteen books on those topics. His books relevant to Jewish law include: A Living Tree: The Roots and Growth of Jewish Law (with Arthur Rosett), The Unfolding Tradition: Philosophies of Jewish Law, and For the Love of God and People: A Philosophy of Jewish Law. In addition he has written about 20 rabbinic rulings for the Conservative Movement's Committee on Jewish Law and Standards on such subjects as "Donations of Ill-Gotten Gain," "Violent and Defamatory Video Games," and “Providing References for Schools or Jobs,” as well as many topics in medical ethics.

== Responsa ==
On December 6, 2006, the law committee accepted a paper by Rabbis Elliot Dorff, Daniel Nevins and Avram Reisner on same-sex marriage and ordination of homosexual rabbis, while it upheld the biblical prohibition on male intercourse. In addition, Dorff has written responsa adopted by the Conservative Movement's Committee on Jewish Law and Standards on these and other topics: end-of-life medical issues; artificial insemination, egg donation, and adoption; assisted suicide; donations of ill-gotten gain; and violent or defamatory video games.

== Bibliography ==
- Elliot N. Dorff (1970). Jewish law and modern ideology: a confrontation based on source materials. United Synagogue Commission on Jewish Education. ISBN 9780838102091.
- Elliot N. Dorff (1978). Conservative Judaism: Our Ancestors to Our Descendants. U'd Syn Conservative Judaism. GGKEY:4ZJDQ31X11K.
- Elliot N. Dorff (1989). Mitzvah Means Commandment. U'd Syn Conservative Judaism. GGKEY:7U2Y4UGG8NC.
- Elliot N. Dorff; Louis E. Newman (1995). Contemporary Jewish Ethics and Morality: A Reader. Oxford University Press. ISBN 978-0-19-509066-6.
- Elliot N. Dorff (2003). Matters of Life and Death. Jewish Publication Society. ISBN 978-0-8276-1022-4.
- Elliot N. Dorff (1996). Knowing God: Jewish Journeys to the Unknowable. Jason Aronson, Incorporated. ISBN 978-1-4616-2931-3.
- Elliot N. Dorff; Louis E. Newman (1999). Contemporary Jewish Theology: A Reader. Oxford University Press. ISBN 978-0-19-511467-6.
- Elliot N. Dorff (2004). To Do the Right and the Good: A Jewish Approach to Modern Social Ethics. Jewish Publication Society. ISBN 978-0-8276-0774-3.
- Elliot N. Dorff (2005). The Unfolding Tradition: Jewish Law After Sinai. Aviv Press. ISBN 978-0-916219-29-1.
- Elliot N. Dorff (2006). Love Your Neighbor and Yourself: A Jewish Approach to Modern Personal Ethics. Jewish Publication Society. ISBN 978-0-8276-0825-2.
- Elliot N. Dorff (2007). The Way Into Tikkun Olam: Repairing the World. Jewish Lights Publishing. ISBN 978-1-58023-328-6.
- Elliot N. Dorff; Cory Willson (2008). The Jewish Approach to Repairing the World (Tikkun Olam): A Brief Introduction for Christians. Jewish Lights Publishing. ISBN 978-1-58023-349-1.
- Elliot N. Dorff; Louis E. Newman, eds. (2008). Jewish Choices, Jewish Voices: Body. Jewish Publication Society. ISBN 978-0-8276-0860-3.
- Elliot N. Dorff; Louis E. Newman, eds. (2008). Jewish Choices, Jewish Voices: Power. Jewish Publication Society. ISBN 978-0-8276-0860-3.
- Elliot N. Dorff; Louis E. Newman, eds. (2008). Jewish Choices, Jewish Voices: Money. Jewish Publication Society. ISBN 978-0-8276-0861-0.
- Elliot N. Dorff; Danya Ruttenberg; Louis E Newman, eds. (2010). Jewish Choices, Jewish Voices: War and National Security. Jewish Publication Society. ISBN 978-0-8276-1123-8.
- Elliot N. Dorff; Danya Ruttenberg, eds. (2010). Jewish Choices, Jewish Voices: Sex and Intimacy. Jewish Publication Society. ISBN 978-0-8276-0955-6.
- Elliot N. Dorff; Danya Ruttenberg, eds. (2010). Jewish Choices, Jewish Voices: Social Justice. Jewish Publication Society. ISBN 978-0-8276-1124-5.
- Elliot N. Dorff (2010). For the Love of God and People: A Philosophy of Jewish Law. U of Nebraska Press. ISBN 978-0-8276-1044-6.
- Elliot N. Dorff; Arthur Rossett (2012). Living Tree, A: The Roots and Growth of Jewish Law. SUNY Press. ISBN 978-1-4384-0142-3.
- Elliot N. Dorff; Laurie Zoloth (March 2015). Jews and Genes: The Genetic Future in Contemporary Jewish Thought. U of Nebraska Press. ISBN 978-0-8276-1194-8.
- Elliot N. Dorff; Jonathan K. Crane, eds. (2016). The Oxford Handbook of Jewish Ethics and Morality. Oxford University Press. ISBN 978-0-19-060838-5.
- Elliot N. Dorff (2018). Modern Conservative Judaism: Evolving Thought and Practice. U of Nebraska Press. ISBN 978-0-8276-1387-4.

For his responsa:

- https://rabbinicalassembly.org/law/teshuvot_public.html
- Responsa 1991-2000: The Committee on Jewish Law and Standards, 2001, The Rabbinical Assembly
- Proceedings of the Committee on Jewish Law and Standards of the Conservative Movement 1986 - 1990, The Rabbinical Assembly, 2001.
- Life & Death Responsibilities in Jewish Biomedical Ethics, Aaron L. Mackler, JTS, 2000

== Awards ==
1965-1971: Danforth Foundation Fellowship

- 2002-2003: National Jewish Book Award for To Do the Right and the Good: A Jewish Approach to Modern Social Ethics.

2006: Lifetime Achievement Award of the Journal of Law and Religion.

== See also ==
- American philosophy
- List of American philosophers
- Conservative responsa
