= Jacob Agus =

Polish-born American liberal Conservative rabbi and theologian

Rabbi Jacob Bernard Agus
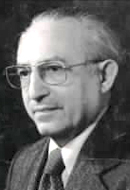
- Jacob Agus

Personal life
- Born: November 8, 1911 Poland
- Died: September 26, 1986 (aged 74)
- Spouse: Miriam Shore (m. 1940)
- Main interest(s): Jewish theology, interfaith dialogue
- Notable work(s): Modern Philosophies of Judaism, Guideposts in Modern Judaism, Dialogue and Tradition
- Education: Yeshiva College (Yeshiva University), Harvard University
- Occupation: Rabbi, theologian, author

Religious life
- Religion: Judaism
- Denomination: Conservative

Jacob Bernard Agus (November 8, 1911 – September 26, 1986) was a Polish-born American Conservative rabbi and theologian who played a key role in the Conservative Rabbinical Assembly.

== Early life and education ==
Agus (the family name was originally Agushewitz), was born in Poland in 1911 and his family emigrated to the United States in 1927. He attended the Talmudic Academy in New York, graduating in 1929. He received his B.A. from Yeshiva College in 1933. He received semicha from Moshe Soloveichik at the Rabbi Isaac Elchanan Theological Seminary of Yeshiva University in 1935. In 1940, he received a PhD in Jewish Thought from Harvard University and married Miriam Shore that same year. His elder brother, Irving A. Agus, taught medieval Jewish history at Yeshiva University.

== Career ==
Jacob Agus was a leading thinker of the Conservative movement's liberal wing, heading Rabbinical Assembly committees on the Sabbath, prayerbook, and ideology of the Conservative movement. He was also a rabbi of Beth El Congregation in Baltimore, Maryland, and a promoter of interfaith communication, which he referred to as "dialogue" or "trialogue".

Agus's rabbinic career included appointments at Congregation Beth Abraham, Norfolk, Virginia, 1934–1936; Temple Ashkenaz, Cambridge, Massachusetts from 1936 to 1940; Agudas Achim North Shore Congregation in Chicago from 1940 to 1942; and Beth Abraham United Synagogue Center in Dayton, Ohio from 1942 to 1950. In 1945, Agus formally affiliated with the Conservative movement by joining the Rabbinical Assembly. In 1950 he became the rabbi of Beth El Congregation in Baltimore, where he remained for thirty years, retiring in 1980. As a member of the Conservative movement's Rabbinical Assembly he was active in the Committee on Jewish Law and Standards, chaired the Prayer Book Committee (1952–1956) and worked to define Conservative Jewish ideology through a series of conferences, committees and other gatherings, including the Continuing Conference on Conservative Ideology (1956–1963). With Morris Adler and Theodore Friedman, he co-authored the 1950 Responsum on the Sabbath that allowed Conservative Jews to drive to a synagogue on the Sabbath if no synagogue was within walking distance. He taught at the Reconstructionist Rabbinical College, St. Mary's Seminary and Ecumenical Institute, where he was also a founder of the Interfaith Roundtable, and at both Temple University and Dropsie College in Philadelphia. In 1965, he accepted an invitation to teach at the Seminario Rabinico Latinoamerico in Buenos Aires. He remained in Argentina for two months, then traveled to Brazil where he spent two weeks lecturing under the auspices of the American Jewish Committee and the Brazilian Institute for Culture and Information. In Latin America, he developed continuing ties with students and colleagues – among them Marshall Meyer, then director of the Seminario. These ties are documented in the correspondence contained in this collection.

In addition to his rabbinical and scholarly work, Agus championed the cause of interfaith and interracial relations, dubbing his efforts to promote Jewish/Christian and Jewish/Christian/Muslim relations "dialogue" and "trialogue." He also served on the boards of the Baltimore National Council on Christians and Jews, and Morgan State University, a predominantly African-American institution, also in Baltimore. Professor Steven Katz described him as "a remarkable American Rabbi and scholar, illuminating Agus' commitment to Jewish people everywhere, his profound and unwavering spirituality, his continual reminders of the very real dangers of pseudo-Messianism and misplaced romantic zeal, and his willingness to take politically and religiously unpopular stands."

== Interfaith ==
Agus was one of the principal theologians of the American Jewish-Christian dialogue. He developed a dual covenant theory based on the thought of Franz Rosenzweig. He envisioned a symbiosis of the two religions.

Rosenzweig’s view was remarkable, in that, the Christian community was engaged in fulfilling Israel's mission. The people Israel are like the sun; the Christian community was the effluence of Divine rays permeating the nations with the spirit of monotheism. The boundary line between Judaism and Christianity was not along the plane of intellectual thought, since the divine being could only be caught figuratively or symbolically within the meshes of human reason.

== Personal life ==
Agus and his wife Miriam had four children including Zalman, Robert, Deborah and Edna. He had 10 grandchildren at the time of his death in 1986. One of his grandchildren is physician David Agus.

== Works ==
- Modern Philosophies of Judaism (1941)
- Banner of Jerusalem a biography of Abraham Isaac Kook, Chief Rabbi of Palestine in the 1930s.(1946)
- Guideposts in Modern Judaism (1954)
- The Evolution of Jewish Thought (1959)
- The Meaning of Jewish History (1963)
- The vision and the way; an interpretation of Jewish ethics
- Dialogue and Tradition : The Response of Judaism to the Major Challenges of the Contemporary World

== Bibliography ==
- Agus, Jacob Bernard. Dialogue and Tradition: The Challenges of Contemporary Judeo-Christian Thought. Dorley House Books, Inc.; ISBN 9780200715492.
