= Rabbinical Assembly =

International association of Conservative rabbis

- Abbreviation: RA
- Founded: June 17, 1901; 125 years ago
- Type: Professional association
- Tax ID no.: 13-1663324
- Legal status: 501(c)(3)
- Headquarters: New York, New York, U.S.
- Coordinates: 40.812148°N 73.960768°W
- President: Rabbi Gesa Ederberg
- Chief Executive Officer: Rabbi Jacob Blumenthal
- Website: www.rabbinicalassembly.org
- Formerly called: Alumni Association of the Jewish Theological Seminary

The Rabbinical Assembly (RA) is the international association of Conservative rabbis. The RA was founded in 1901 to shape the ideology, programs, and practices of the Conservative movement. It publishes prayerbooks and books of Jewish interest, and oversees the work of the Committee on Jewish Law and Standards for the Conservative movement. It organizes conferences and coordinates the Joint Placement Commission of the Conservative movement. Members of the RA serve as rabbis, educators, community workers and military and hospital chaplains around the world.

Rabbis ordained by Jewish Theological Seminary of America (New York, New York), the Ziegler School of Rabbinic Studies at the American Jewish University (Los Angeles, California), The Seminario Rabínico Latinoamericano (Buenos Aires, Argentina), The Zacharias Frankel College (Berlin, Germany) and The Schechter Rabbinical Seminary (Israeli-administered Jerusalem) automatically become members of the RA upon their ordination. Rabbis whose ordination is from other seminaries and yeshivas may also be admitted to the RA. As of 2010, there were 1,648 members of the RA.

The majority of RA members serve in the United States and Canada, while more than ten percent of its rabbis serve in Israel and many of its rabbis serve in Latin America, in the countries of Europe, Australia, and Africa.

== History ==
The Rabbinical Assembly was founded in 1901 as the Alumni Association of the Jewish Theological Seminary of America (JTS). Henry M. Speaker served as the first president. In 1918, the association changed its name to the Rabbinical Assembly, opening itself up to rabbis ordained at institutions other than JTS.

The longest-serving executive vice president of the Rabbinical Assembly was Wolfe Kelman, who accepted the post in 1951 and continued in the post until 1989.

In 1985, the RA admitted its first female member, Rabbi Amy Eilberg. It immediately afterward proceeded to admit Rabbis Jan Caryl Kaufman and Beverly Magidson. By 2010, 273 of the 1648 members of the Rabbinical Assembly were women.

In 1989, upon Wolfe Kelman's retirement, Joel H. Meyers became executive director of the RA. In 1991, Meyers was appointed executive vice president, and he served in this role until his retirement in 2008.

In October 2008, Julie Schonfeld was named as the new executive vice president of the Rabbinical Assembly, making her the first female rabbi to serve in the chief executive position of an American rabbinical association. She later become Chief Executive Officer of the RA.

In 2011, Rachel Isaacs became the first openly gay rabbi to join the Rabbinical Assembly.

Rabbi Jacob Blumenthal has served as its CEO since 2020.

== Bodies for interpreting Jewish law ==
The Committee on Jewish Law and Standards (CJLS) is the movement's central body on interpreting Jewish law and custom; it was founded by the Rabbinical Assembly in 1927, with Max Drob as its first head. It presently composed of 25 rabbis, who are voting members, and five laypeople, who do not vote but participate fully in deliberations. When any six (or more) members vote in favor of a position, that position becomes an official position of the Rabbinical Assembly. An individual rabbi, however, functions as the mara de-atra (מרא דאתרא, lit. "master of the house" in Aramaic, the local authority in Jewish law), adopting the position he or she considers most compelling, even if it has not been approved by the CJLS.

The Rabbinical Assembly of Israel (the Israeli arm of the RA) has its own decision making body, the Va'ad Halacha. Responsa by both the CJLS and the Va'ad Halacha are equally valid, although the Va'ad's emphasis is on issues pertaining to Israeli society. The CJLS and the Va'ad do not always come up with the same answer to a question. Individual rabbis are free to decide which responsa to adopt or to develop their own halakhic positions.

== Publications ==
The RA has also published prayer books for Shabbat and weekdays, most recently Siddur Sim Shalom and Or Hadash: A Commentary on Siddur Sim Shalom by Reuven Hammer.

It has also published prayer books for Rosh Hashanah and Yom Kippur, most recently Mahzor Lev Shalem. The RA has also published liturgical texts for other days on the Jewish calendar, such as Megillat Hashoah: The Holocaust Scroll for Yom Ha-shoah and Siddur Tishah B'Av for the fast day of Tishah B'Av.

In cooperation with the United Synagogue of Conservative Judaism and the Jewish Publication Society, the RA published the Etz Hayim Humash, a Torah commentary for synagogue use.

In cooperation with the Jewish Theological Seminary of America, the RA also publishes a scholarly quarterly journal, Conservative Judaism, which is edited by Martin Samuel Cohen.

Under its Aviv Press imprint, the RA publishes books on Jewish spirituality and contemporary Jewish practice written by its members. The earliest publications by Aviv Press were:

- a Torah commentary by Ismar Schorsch
- meditations on the Jewish year by Jonathan Wittenberg
- meditations on the psalms by Martin Samuel Cohen
- a volume describing different approaches to Jewish law edited by Elliot Dorff
- an introduction to Judaism as a compassionate, mindful practice by Jonathan P. Slater
- an introduction to Musar as a spiritual path by Ira F. Stone

In April 2012, the Rabbinical Assembly published new guide to Jewish law and practice, The Observant Life: A Guide to Ritual and Ethics for Conservative Jews, edited by Martin Samuel Cohen and Michael Katz.

Members of the RA have their own private discussion group, "Ravnet".

== Leadership ==
The Rabbinical Assembly has been served by a variety of volunteer presidents over the course of its history. Below is a listing of those who served as presidents during the 21st century:

- Vernon Kurtz (2000–2002)
- Reuven Hammer (2002–2004)
- Perry Rank (2004–2006)
- Alvin Berkun (2006–2008)
- Jeffrey Wohlberg (2008–2010)
- Gilah Dror (2010–2012)
- Gerald Skolnik (2012–2014)
- William Gershon (2014–2016)
- Philip Scheim (2016–2018)
- Debra Newman Kamin (2018–2020)
- Stewart Vogel (2020–2022)
- Harold J. Kravitz (2022–2024)
- Jay M. Kornsgold (2024-2026)
- Gesa Shira Ederberg 2026~

== See also ==
- Conservative responsa
- Committee on Jewish Law and Standards
- Vaad
