= Mauricio Balter =

Conservative Judaism leader (born 1957)

Mauricio Balter מאוריסיו בלטר
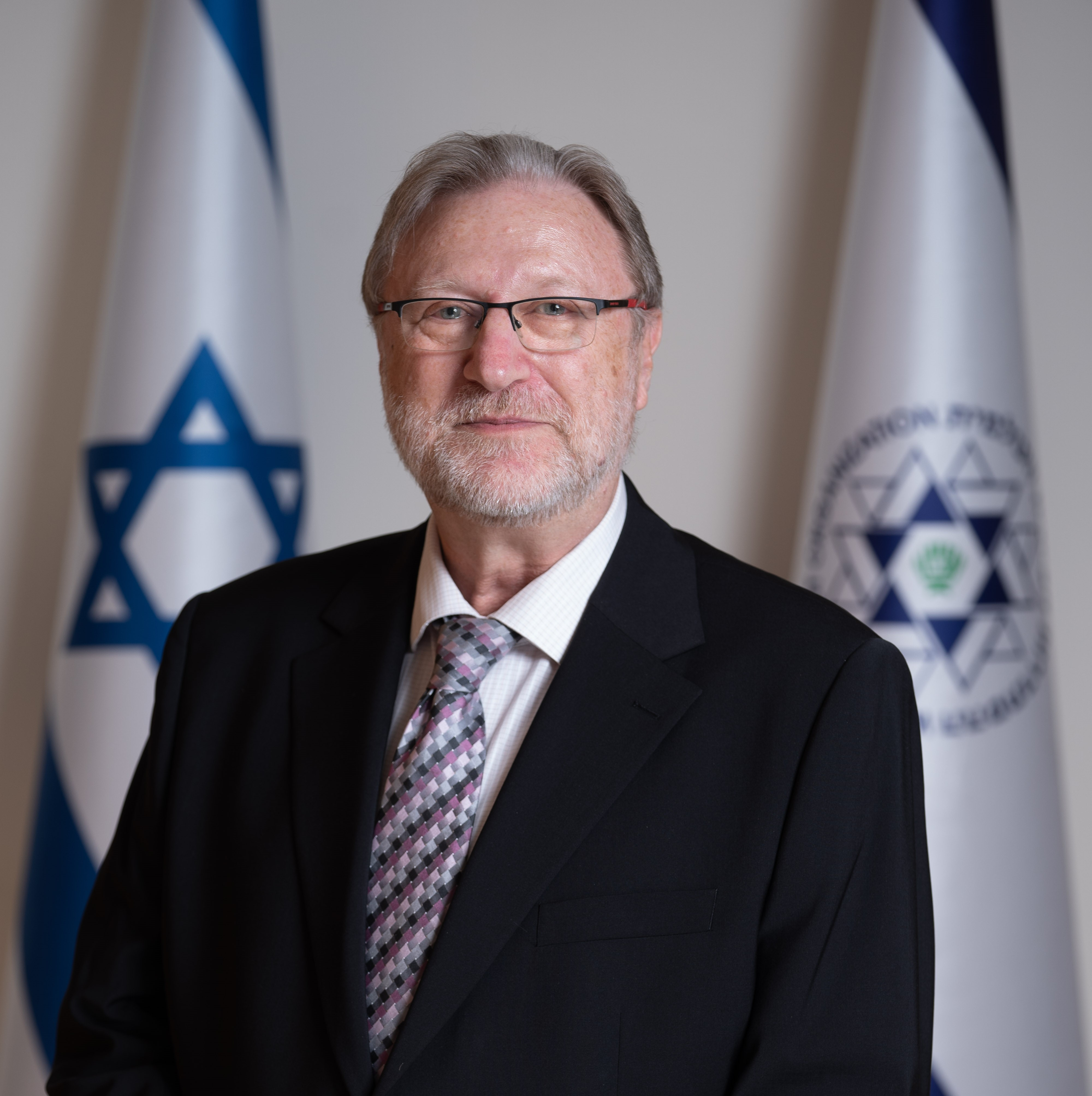

Personal life
- Born: 1957 (age 68–69) Uruguay
- Spouse: Bilha
- Education: Universidad Centro de Altos Estudios en Ciencias Exactas
- Occupation: Rabbi and Executive Director

Religious life
- Religion: Judaism
- Denomination: Masorti/Conservative Judaism
- Profession: Executive Director

Jewish leader
- Predecessor: Rabbi Zvi Graetz
- Position: Executive Director
- Organisation: Masorti Olami and MERCAZ Olami
- Began: 2017
- Residence: Jerusalem, Israel
- Semikhah: Seminario Rabinico Latinoamericano

Rabbi Mauricio Balter (Hebrew: מאוריסיו בלטר; born 1957) is the executive director of Masorti Olami, the international umbrella organization of the Masorti/Conservative Judaism Movement and MERCAZ Olami, the Movement's Zionist and political arm. As a representative of the Masorti/Conservative Movement, Balter is one of the 37 Directors of the Jewish National Fund and sits on the Education and Community Committee, as well as the Resource Development Committee. Rabbi Balter is founder and member of the Forum for Jewish Renewal in the Negev and founder of the Negev Interfaith Initiative Dialogue. Rabbi Balter serves as an executive member of the World Zionist Organization, a member of the board of governors of KKL-JNF, Keren HaYesod and the Jewish Agency for Israel.

== Biography ==
Rabbi Mauricio Balter was born in 1957 in Uruguay and became involved in Jewish life and Zionist activities at a young age in his native country. In July, 1995 Rabbi Balter made Aliyah to Israel together with his family. Rabbi Balter holds B.A and B.S degrees in Education and Judaism, respectively. He received his Rabbinic Ordination from the Seminario Rabinico Latinoamericano Marshal T. Meyer, in Buenos Aires, Argentina in May 1991 and his M.A. in Jewish Thought from Haifa University, Israel in 2003. He holds a B.A. in Psychopedagogy from the Universidad Centro de Altos Estudios en Ciencias Exactas. He is married to his wife, Bilha and is a father to two daughters and has two grandchildren.

== Career ==
Balter served as general director of the Sephardi community in Bogotá, Colombia and director of religious affairs of the Salta and San Miguel de Tucumán communities in Argentina upon graduating from university. After receiving his smicha in 1991, he served at the Or Hadash community in Buenos Aires, Argentina. During this period he was responsible for supporting the many families of those killed in the AMIA Bombing, an attack on the building of the Jewish community in Argentina, taking care of spiritual services. He was the first director of the Masorti Movement in Argentina. In total, he was involved in public activity in South America for fourteen years.

After immigrating to Israel in the summer of 1995 with his wife Bilha and their two daughters, he was appointed rabbi of the Kiryat Bialik Masorti community. He held the position for fifteen years. Since 1997, he has coordinated with the Jewish Agency on the topic of Aliyah of Masorti/Conservative Jews from around the world, bringing five hundred families from Argentina between 1997 and 2007, around the years of the severe economic crisis of 1998–2002. Balter and his wife helped with the conversions of some of these individuals who made Aliya from Latin America, as part of the Joint Institute for Jewish Studies. However, some of these conversions were not approved. During the Second Lebanon War, he coordinated his congregation's state of Emergency and provided spiritual support to residents of Kiryat Bialik. In 1999, Balter was one of the first six non-Orthodox representatives to join a religious council in Israel, and took a seat in Kiryat Bialik. In early 2003, he was elected president of the Rabbinical Assembly in Israel, a role he held for six terms. He is also a member of the executive committee member of the World Rabbinical Assembly. He was elected to the Zionist General Council in 2006 and served until 2012. Rabbi Balter was vice chairman of the Masorti/Conservative Movement in Israel and secretary and member of the administrative committee and executive council of the International Rabbinical Assembly, New York. He was also chairman of the Siddur and Machzor Committee at the Rabbinical Assembly Israel.

As chairman of the Liturgy Committee of the Masorti Movement in Israel, he headed the team that prepared and conducted I and my prayers: an Israeli arrangement, an Israeli Masorti Siddur that was published in 2009. In 2010, he left Kiryat Bialik and moved to Be'er Sheva, where he was appointed Rabbi of K. Eshel Avraham, the largest conservative community in southern Israel, serving the community for 7 years until 2017. Since 2017, he has served as executive director of Masorti Olami and MERCAZ Olami.

== Opinions ==
Balter has consistently supported declared LGBT ordination to the rabbinate, an issue that divided the movement throughout the 1990s and early 2000s: In 2006, when the move was made possible in the United States, no decision was made in Israel and the Schechter Institute continued to reject such candidates. After further voting, the issue was confirmed.

In his view, he belongs to the liberal wing of Masorti/Conservative Judaism, which advocates an existentialist theology of perpetual relations between the Creator and the authors of the Scriptures.

Alongside the Masorti Movement, Rabbi Balter supports having an egalitarian section at the Western Wall in Jerusalem and has been pushing for the implementation of the Kotel agreement which has stalled.

Rabbi Balter has spoken out against xenophobia and racism, particularly against Arabs in Israel. In response to a letter by Lehava, an organization that encourages Jewish women and girls not to date or marry non-Jews, Rabbi Balter responded that this xenophobia is contrary to Judaism and shows racism.

== Honors ==
In 2020, Balter was honored by the Jewish Theological Seminary of America at their convocation for over 25 years of service.

== Publications ==
Balter has written a number of articles for the public and has appeared on a variety of podcasts for example on the Spanish version of Can, an Israeli TV station. He was also interviewed by Radio Jai, a Jewish radio station based in Buenos Aires, Argentina. He has been interviewed for his opinions on a variety of topics, such as pluralism and tradition, and about the gap between Israeli Jews and the Diaspora.
