= Olami =

Olami may refer to:

- Masorti Olami, umbrella organization for Masorti Judaism
- Mercaz Olami, Zionist political movement representing the movement for Conservative Judaism
- Netzer Olami, youth movement of the World Union for Progressive Judaism
- Olami (organization), a global Jewish outreach network
