= Kehilat Nitzan =

Kehilat Nitzan is a Masorti (a branch of Conservative Judaism) congregation in Melbourne, Australia. It is affiliated with Masorti Olami, the World Council of Conservative Congregations.

== History ==
It was the first founded and currently only Australian Masorti congregation in Australia. It was co-founded in 1999 by educator John Rosenberg. The congregation has approximately 250 families.

The congregation originally met at rented facilities at the Kadimah Jewish Cultural Centre in Elsternwick and at B'nai B'rith House in Balaclava. In July 2013, it moved into its own building on Hawthorn Road in Caulfield North. Services are traditional egalitarian and are led by members of the congregation. The congregation uses the Conservative movement's Siddur Sim Shalom and Lev Shalem prayerbooks.
