= David Lazar (rabbi) =

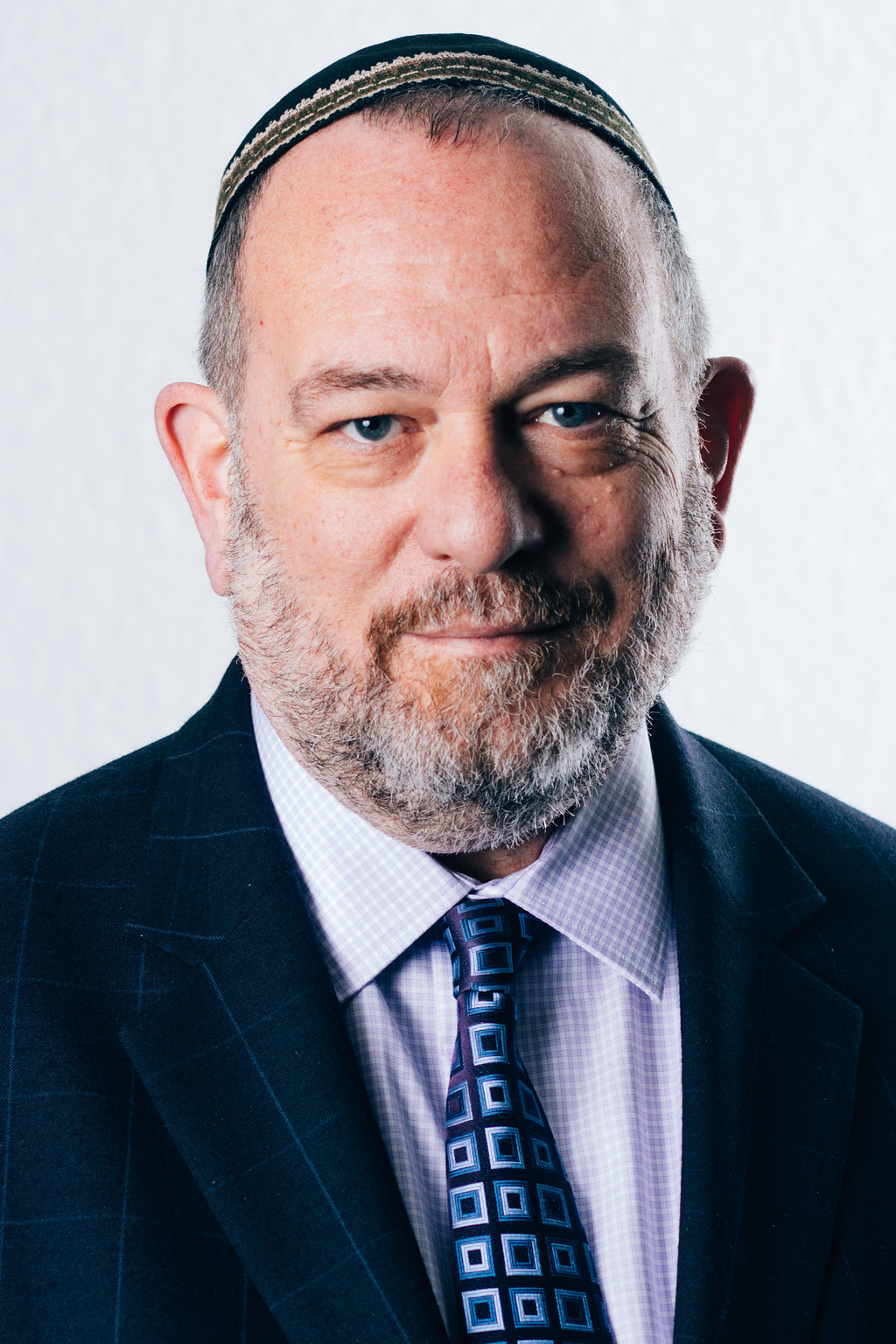
Lazar

David James Lazar (born January 28, 1957) is a United States-born rabbi-educator, and Rabbi at Or Hamidbar in Palm Springs, California. He has worked in Israel and Europe for more than 30 years.

== Early life and times ==
Raised in a committed liberal Conservative Movement family in Los Angeles, Lazar moved toward Orthodoxy in his teens. After completing his army service in 1980, he was one of the founders of Moshav Gan Or at Netzarim in the Gaza Strip. It is there that he met his wife Sascha Meijers - an immigrant to Israel from the Netherlands - and were married in the summer of 1981. They then moved to Jerusalem the year after.

Lazar was educated at Yeshivat Kerem B’Yavneh, where he combined Jewish studies with service in the IDF's armor-corp. His BA in Bible Studies is from the Hebrew University and, rabbinic ordination and MA in Jewish Studies (1993) are from the Schechter Institute. He was also a Jerusalem Fellow at the Mandel School for Educational Leadership (1998–2000).

Before becoming the founding rabbi of Or Hamidbar in Palm Springs, California, Lazar served for more than two decades as a congregational rabbi and educator in Israel and Europe. In Jerusalem, he was education director at Kehilat Mevakshei Derech, then an independent congregation, and later rabbi of Kehilat Ya’ar Ramot, affiliated with the Masorti (Conservative) movement. After exploring Orthodox Judaism earlier in his life, he was ordained as a Conservative rabbi in 1993.

He later moved to Tel Aviv, where he served as spiritual leader of Kehilat Tiferet Shalom, a Masorti congregation. From 2010 to 2013, he was rabbi of the Jewish Community of Stockholm, Sweden and was active in GLBTQ advocacy and interfaith dialogue. Following his tenure there, he served as rabbi and educator at Temple Isaiah and the Jewish Community Center of Palm Springs until 2018. He subsequently founded Or Hamidbar, an independent Jewish spiritual community in the Palm Springs area.

Lazar has worked in a range of educational settings, including the TALI school system, Camp Ramah in California and Canada, and the NOAM and Young Judea youth movements. In 1999, he founded RIKMA: Spiritual Community Leadership Development, an initiative that provides training and support for Masorti and Reform rabbis.

Throughout his career, Lazar has been involved with nonprofit and advocacy organizations, including the Israel AIDS Task Force, the Jerusalem Open House, and the Rabbinical Assembly. In December 2025, he was honored in Tel Aviv at a World AIDS Day gathering marking 40 years of the Israel AIDS Task Force, recognizing activists, medical professionals, and community leaders involved in HIV awareness and support in Israel.

While serving in Stockholm and in subsequent years, Lazar has participated in interfaith dialogue initiatives. In August 2025, he took part in the program “A World of Neighbours – Is It Possible?” at the Central Mosque in Stockholm, addressing themes of faith, migration, and social responsibility. He also represented Or Hamidbar at Fisksätra Church in Sweden, where he participated in a panel discussion on “Antireligious Racism in a Time of Polarization,” alongside religious leaders and scholars from different traditions.

A documentary film, The New Rabbi, directed by Irene Lopez and Stefan Henriksson, began production in 2013 and follows his work in Stockholm.

He lives in Palm Springs with his wife, Sascha.
