= Alan Silverstein =

American Conservative rabbi and writer

Alan Silverstein is an American Conservative rabbi, lecturer, writer, and Rabbi Emeritus of Congregation Agudath Israel in Caldwell, New Jersey. He has served as Vice President of the National Council of Synagogues, President of the International Rabbinical Assembly of the Conservative Movement, President of the Masorti Olami, and President of Mercaz Olami.

== Education ==
Alan Silverstein was raised in the Overbrook Park neighborhood of Philadelphia. He graduated from Central High School in 1966 and went on to receive a Bachelor of Arts degree in history from Cornell University in 1970 and a Master of Arts degree in Jewish History from Columbia University in 1973. He was ordained as a Rabbi at the Jewish Theological Seminary of America in 1975 and received a Ph.D. in Jewish History from the Seminary's Institute for the Advanced Study in Humanities in 1989.

== Career ==
From 1975-1979, Silverstein served as rabbi at Congregation Tifereth Israel in Neshaminy, Pennsylvania. He became rabbi at Congregation Agudath Israel in Caldwell, New Jersey in 1979. In 2018, Silverstein announced his plans to retire as rabbi of Congregation Agudath Israel by 2021.

Silverstein has written and published three books and maintains a blog with the Times of Israel.

=== Offices held ===
- President, West Essex Clergy Association
- President, MetroWest Board of Rabbis
- President, Region of the Rabbinical Assembly New Jersey Region
- President, Coalition of Religious Leaders
- President of The International Rabbinical Assembly of the Conservative Movement (1993-1995)
- President of Masorti Olami (2000 - 2005)
- Vice President, National Council of Synagogues
- Member, National Rabbinic Cabinet of the United Jewish Appeal
- Chair, Foundation for Masorti Judaism in Israel (2010-2014)
- President, Mercaz Olami (2016- )

== Published works ==
- Alternatives to Assimilation: The Response of Reform Judaism to American Culture, 1840–1930 (1994)
- It All Begins With A Date: Jewish Concerns About Intermarriage (1995)
- Preserving Judaism in Your Family After Intermarriage Has Occurred (1995)
