= Yizhar =

Yizhar may refer to:

== People ==
=== Given name ===
- Yizhar Ashdot (born 1958), Israeli musician
- Yizhar Cohen (swimmer) (born 1962), Israeli paralympic swimmer
- Yizhar Harari (1908–78), Israeli Zionist activist and politician
- Yizhar Hess (born 1967), CEO of the Masorti Judaism movement in Israel
- Yizhar Hirschfeld (1950–2006), Israeli archaeologist
- Yizhar Shai (born 1963), Israeli businessman and politician
- Yizhar Smilansky (1916–2006), better known by his pen name S. Yizhar, Israeli writer and politician

=== Surname ===
- S. Yizhar, see Yishar Smilanksy above)

== Other ==
- Yitzhar, an Israeli settlement in the West Bank
