= Yizhar Hess =

Israeli activist and Vice Chairman of the World Zionist Organization

- יזהר הס
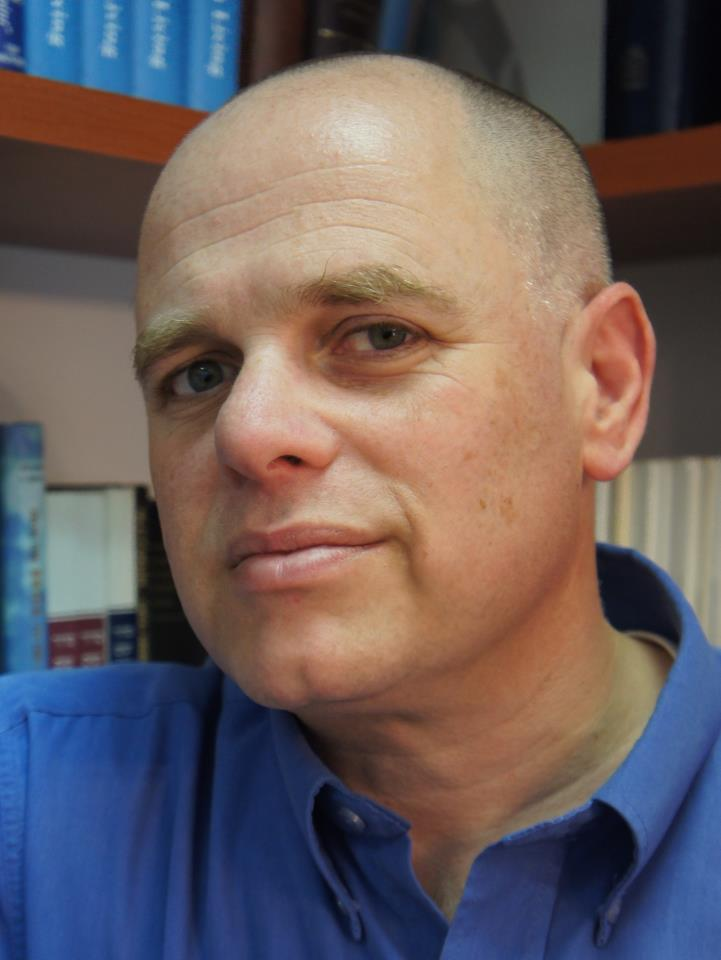
- Yizhar Hess
- Born: July 5, 1967 (age 59); Jerusalem, Israel
- Education: B.A. in Hebrew Literature and Political Science, Hebrew University of Jerusalem; Law degree, Interdisciplinary Center Herzliya; M.A. in Jewish Studies, Schechter Institute of Jewish Studies; Ph.D. in Philosophy of Education, Sussex University
- Occupations: Vice Chairman of the World Zionist Organization; Activist; Commentator on religion and state issues in Israel
- Known for: Former CEO of the Masorti Movement in Israel
- Board member of: World Zionist Organization; Jewish Agency for Israel; KKL/JNF; Keren Hayesod

Yizhar Hess (Hebrew: יזהר הס; born July 5, 1967) is Vice Chairman of the World Zionist Organization. He was elected to that role in 2020 as a representative of MERCAZ, the Zionist slate of the global Masorti/Conservative Movement. He is an activist and commentator on issues of religion and state in Israel, religious pluralism, and Israel-Diaspora relations. Hess previously served for thirteen years as CEO of the Masorti Movement in Israel.

== Biography ==
Yizhar Hess was born and educated in Jerusalem. He studied at Gymnasia Rehavia and was active in Tzofim (scouts). He has a BA in Hebrew Literature and Political Science from the Hebrew University in Jerusalem, a degree in law from The Interdisciplinary Center Herzliya and an MA degree in Jewish Studies from the Schechter Institute of Jewish Studies, and a Ph.D. from the Department of Philosophy of Education at Sussex University in Brighton, England.

Hess began his service with the Israel Defense Forces in 1985 in the Armored Corps and later became an information officer in the Education and Youth Corps.

== Media career ==
After his release from the army in 1990, Hess worked as a copywriter in an advertising agency and later as a journalist for Shishi, a newspaper that appeared on Fridays.

== Academic career ==
During his studies at the Hebrew University, he joined the Shorashim Institute for Jewish Studies. Hess conducted and directed seminars at the Institute until he was appointed vice CEO of the Institute in 1996, a position he held until 1999.

== Israel diplomacy ==
In 2000 Hess started serving as the Jewish Agency's shaliach to Tucson, Arizona. He wrote a weekly column in the Arizona Jewish Post and won an excellence Award (2002) from the Association of Jewish Centers in North America (now known as the JCCA, the JCC Association) for the many cultural programs he initiated in Arizona and an Excellence Award on behalf of the Jewish Federation (2003). He was also a regular commentator about Israel on the weekly program The Too Jewish Radio Show with Rabbi Sam Cohon and Friends during his tenure in Tucson.

Upon his return to Israel in 2003, he continued to work for the Jewish Agency as director of partnerships between Jewish communities abroad and in Israel.

== Masorti movement ==
Yizhar became the CEO of the Masorti movement in Israel in 2007, holding the position until 2020. He has served as one of the negotiators attempting to work out an agreement to handle pluralist worship at the Western Wall that would meet the requirements of the Women of the Wall and the requirements of Rabbi Shmuel Rabinowitz, the Administrator of the Western Wall and the Holy Sites. An agreement was announced among the various factions in early 2016, but when ultra-orthodox members of the current government coalition threatened to abandon the coalition, Prime Minister Benjamin Netanyahu announced difficulties and said the arrangement would take longer. Hess criticized Netanyahu's backtracking on the agreement.

== Views and opinions ==
Hess has been an outspoken critic of fundamentalism: "We must say it loud and clear: Jewish fundamentalism is no better and no worse than any other kind of religious fundamentalism. The only difference is that it is clear to all of us that we must fight Islamic fundamentalism. But when it comes to the fundamentalism in our own home, the fundamentalism which is active within us, which is threatening our life as a Jewish-democratic state and endangering Zionism as a historic enterprise, we hesitate even after 20 years." Hess also defended Conservative Judaism against criticism from David Lau, Ashkenazi Chief Rabbi of Israel, who made disparaging remarks about Bayit Yehudi chairman and Education Minister Naftali Bennett visiting a Conservative Jewish school in the U.S.

Hess is concerned that if politicians and Orthodox rabbis continue to disparage non-Orthodox streams of Judaism, and the Knesset delays pluralist worship solutions for the Western Wall and passes legislation limiting non-Orthodox access to state-funded mikvehs, this could impact on the relationship between Israel and diaspora Jews.

Since becoming Vice Chairman of the World Zionist Organization, Hess has focused on advancing the idea of Jewish Peoplehood. He has spoken with groups of Israelis and Diaspora Jews about Israel-Diaspora relations, educating Diaspora Jews on issues of religion and state and other political issues in Israel. Elected as a representative of MERCAZ, the Zionist slate of the Masorti/Conservative Movement, Hess has been a leading advocate for advancing pluralism and liberal values in the work of the WZO, Jewish Agency and KKL/JNF, Keren Hayesod, where he serves on their boards of directors. During the protests against the proposed judicial overhaul in Israel in 2023, Hess was a leading voice representing the concerns of Diaspora Jews.
