= Mercaz Olami =

Zionist political organization

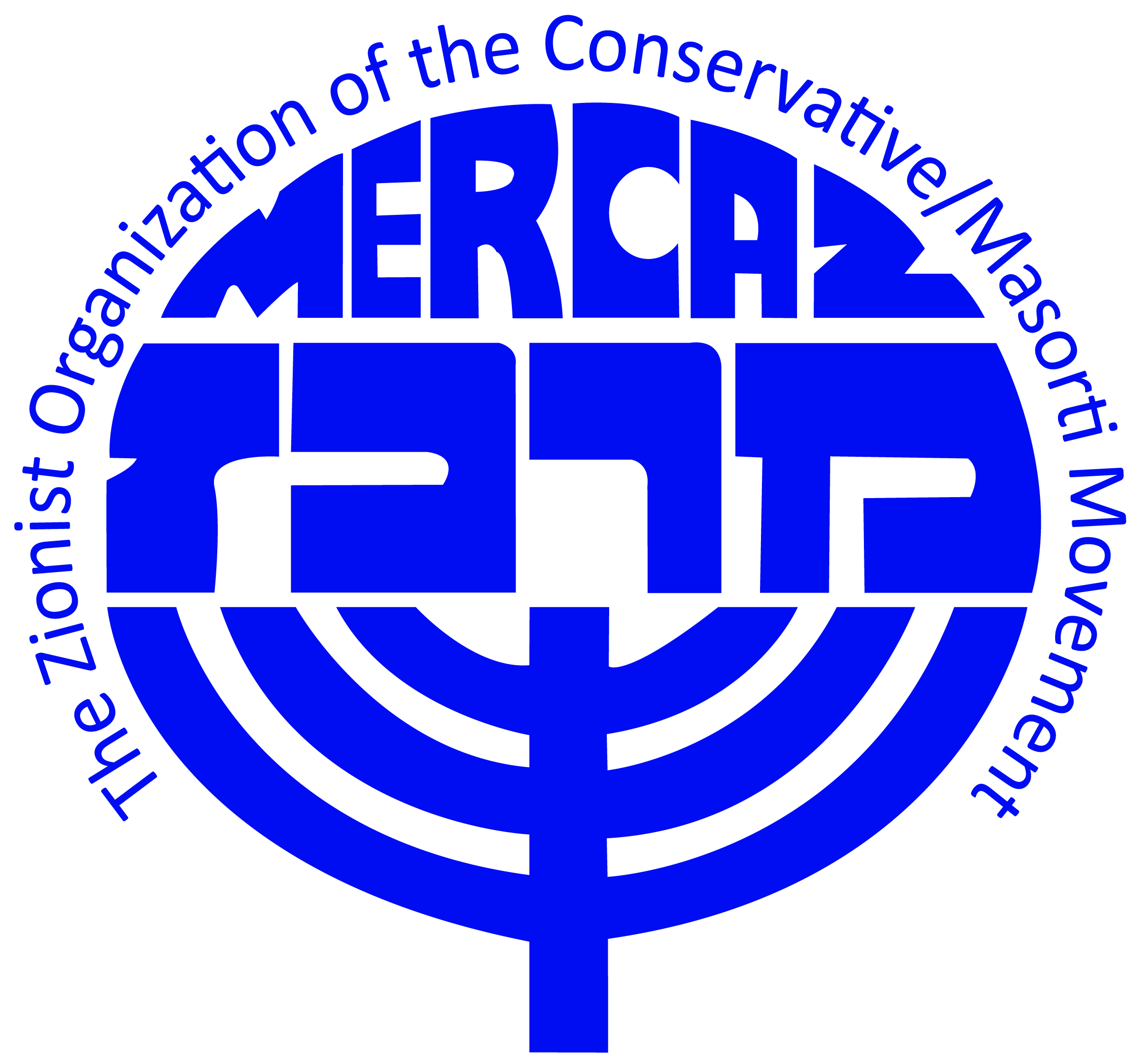
- Mercaz Olami Logo
- Theology: Conservative Judaism
- President: Rabbi Dr. Alan Silverstein
- Executive Director: Rabbi Mauricio Balter
- Associations: Masorti Olami; American Zionist Movement; World Zionist Organization; World Zionist Congress; Jewish National Fund
- Region: Worldwide
- Headquarters: Beit Miriam, General Pierre Koenig St 32, Jerusalem, 9346940, Israel
- Official website: mercaz.masortiolami.org

Mercaz Olami is a Zionist political organization representing the world Masorti/Conservative Movement of Judaism at the World Zionist Organization, Jewish Agency for Israel, Keren Kayemeth Leyisrael and Keren HaYesod.

By running for election to the democratically-elected parliament of the Jewish people, the World Zionist Congress, and working year-round through these four so-called "national institutions" of the Jewish people founded by Herzl and the Zionist movement, the MERCAZ movement advocates for full equality for Masorti/Conservative Judaism and works to advance the Movement's values and interests in Israel. This includes recognition of Conservative and Reform conversions, equal funding for Masorti/Conservative institutions, protecting the Law of Return, promoting religious pluralism, and supporting the implementation of the Western Wall compromise agreement that would allow all streams to practice freely at Judaism's holiest site. "Mercaz" is the Hebrew word for "center", whilst "Olami" means "worldwide" or "global".

== Leadership and Organization ==
Since 2020, Mercaz Olami has five representatives in the National Institutions: Dr. Yizhar Hess, has served as Vice Chairman of the World Zionist Organization, on the Board of Directors of JNF, and as a member of the Jewish Agency Executive. Rabbi Mauricio Balter serves as a member of the Executive of the World Zionist Organization, and on the board of directors of Keren Hayesod, Tammy Gottlieb serves as members of the Executive of the World Zionist Organization. Emily Levy Shochat and Gadi Perl serve on the Board of Directors of KKL. Mercaz has affiliates in 15 countries that represent Masorti/Conservative Jews in their respective countries' Zionist federations. In the United States, Mercaz's affiliate is Mercaz USA.

The current President of Mercaz is Alan Silverstein, a Masorti/Conservative Rabbi, and member of Congregation Agudath Israel in New Jersey. He succeeded Stephen Wolnek in 2016.

The current executive director is Mauricio Balter, the executive director of Masorti Olami. Prior to this, it was Rabbi Tzvi Graetz.

== Accomplishments ==
At the Extraordinary World Zionist Congress in 2023, Mercaz successfully passed two resolutions: one calling on the Israeli government not to amend the Law of Return, and another calling on the Israeli government not to cancel recognition of Conservative and Reform conversions. Mercaz delegates also supported resolutions increasing women's representation in the World Zionist Congress, promoting LGBTQ rights in Israel and the Zionist movement, and opposing the Israeli government's proposed judicial overhaul.

At JNF/KKL, which has an annual budget of approximately $2 billion USD, Mercaz has successfully secured funding for a number of the Masorti/Conservative priorities, while preventing the funding of a number of programs that go against the Masorti/Conservative movements values and interests. Together with its partners, Mercaz helped secure record funding from JNF/KKL for fighting climate change, increased funding for liberal Zionist youth, and increased engagement in education in liberal communities.

=== Results at the 38th World Zionist Congress (2020) ===
The 38th World Zionist Congress took place virtually due to COVID-19 restrictions from October 20–22, 2020. There were 15 slates with 1,800 delegate candidates, competing for 152 seats that are elected by Americans. Mercaz USA won 18 seats out of the 152. Further to this, Mercaz received another 19 mandates from the Diaspora, making it the fourth largest faction at the Congress.

== Viewpoints ==
The Masorti movement (through Mercaz Olami) condemned a plan by the Jewish National Fund to purchase private land in Area C of the West Bank, calling it "damaging to the legitimacy of Israel and favoring the settlement policy of the extreme right in Israel". They stated that the move to buy private Palestinian land "could irreversibly endanger KKL and our homeland". Similarly, the organization denounces West Bank settlements and opposes plans to buy private Arab-owned lands in the areas of the West Bank.

Mercaz Olami also pushes for no restrictions of the Law of Return (the law regarding Jewish immigration to Israel) as well as increased funding for its programs. Important also to the slate is the implementation of the egalitarian prayer plan at the Western Wall, creating a place for non-Orthodox prayer, and an open Jewish "pluralistic society". Mercaz also pushes for recognition of all conversions and weddings performed by Masorti/Conservative rabbis as well as state funding for their rabbis.
