= Neve Granot =

Neighborhood in Jerusalem

Coordinates: 31°46′10.84″N 35°12′15.69″E

Neve Granot is a neighborhood in Jerusalem, located behind the Israel Museum and overlooking the Monastery of the Cross.

Neve Granot is named after Avraham Granot, a Zionist activist and signatory of the Israeli Declaration of Independence who went on to become head of the Jewish National Fund. The Schechter Institute of Jewish Studies in Neve Granot built its new campus there, designed by Israeli architect Ada Carmi.

Neve Granot was built above the Nayot neighborhood. In public perception, the distinction between the two adjacent neighborhoods is blurred, and even Jerusalem residents often confuse them.

The neighborhood is home to the Schechter Institute of Jewish Studies, designed by architect Ada Karmi-Melamede.
