= Masorti Olami =

International Jewish organization

Masorti Olami (World Council of Synagogues, Inc)
- Formation: 1957
- Founded at: New York City
- Headquarters: Beit Miriam, General Pierre Koenig St 32, Jerusalem, 9346940
- Members: ~600,000 (with Israel and North America)
- President: Margo Gold
- Executive Director: Mauricio Balter
- Affiliations: United Synagogue of Conservative Judaism, התנועה Masorti Judaism (UK) etc.

Masorti Olami (also known as the World Council of Synagogues) is an international organization of Masorti Judaism. According to a census by the Council published in 2025, it reportedly had 2 million members and 830 congregations worldwide. Masorti Olami's international headquarters are in Jerusalem and New York City located at the Jewish Theological Seminary of America. The President of Masorti Olami is Margo Gold.

== History ==
The Masorti movement emerged in 1902 with the reorganization of the Jewish Theological Seminary of America in New York City by Rabbi Solomon Schechter. In 1913, Schechter presided over the founding of the United Synagogue of America.

The United Synagogue of America and communities from various countries founded the World Council of Synagogues in 1957 in New York City, in the United States.

According to a census by the Council published in 2025, it reportedly had 2 million members and 830 congregations worldwide.

== Beliefs ==
=== Marriage ===
A 2006 resolution permits the blessing of same-sex unions, and a 2012 resolution allows synagogues to decide about same-sex marriage.

== Mission and vision ==
Masorti Olami's mission is to advance the interests and principles of Masorti Judaism. It works with all other arms of the Conservative/Masorti movement to be an effective spokesperson for Masorti Judaism by emphasizing:

- The study of Torah and the transmission of its principles from generation to generation
- The unity of the Jewish people and fostering ties between Jews wherever they live
- The centrality of the synagogue in the life of the Jewish people
- The importance of maintaining a centrist, dynamic Jewish practice based on halacha and mitzvot, grounded in Jewish knowledge and observance, reflecting a love of tradition and embracing modernity and the positive aspects of change
- The centrality of Israel and the knowledge and use of the Hebrew language in the life of the Jewish people
- The values of egalitarianism, pluralism, tolerance and democracy in the development of Jewish tradition

== Headquarters and leadership ==
Masorti Olami's international headquarters are in Jerusalem at 32 General Pierre Koenig St, with an office in New York City located at the Jewish Theological Seminary of America at 3080 Broadway in Manhattan. The President of Masorti Olami is Rabbi Philip Scheim and Gillian Caplin is the immediate past president. Rabbi Mauricio Balter serves as executive director of both Masorti Olami and MERCAZ Olami.

== Regions covered ==
Masorti Europe and Masorti AmLat (Latin America) are the main regional organizations under the umbrella of Masorti Olami that serve the specific regions.

=== Masorti Europe ===
Masorti Europe, directed by Rabbi Chaim Weiner, is made up of 29 congregations in ten different countries with several more in the process of joining. Masorti Europe provides religious and community services to Jews from across the continent, including:

The European Masorti Beit Din provides halachic conversions, divorces, and halachic rulings. Their Kashrut supervision program offers a unique "One Day License" providing regular caterers a kosher kitchen, ingredients, and supervision which reduces the cost of catering a kosher event.

EAJL, The European Academy for Jewish Liturgy pairs lay leaders with cantors and trains them as Schlichei Tzibur (prayer leaders). This empowers small communities and Chavurot who don't have a full-time rabbi or cantor and is key to creating self-sufficient Masorti communities across Europe. In addition to EAJL, Masorti Europe's Rabbinical placement provides small congregations with rabbis and cantors for the High Holy Days.

NOAM and Marom chapters are active around Europe and hold regional conferences.

Masorti Europe also holds regular leadership conferences for members involved in Jewish Education, Security and Interfaith work, Israel Education, and synagogue board members to create networks of regional collaboration and mutual support.

In Europe, the Masorti Movement is the fastest-growing of the major branches of Judaism. A Masorti rabbinical school opened in Berlin in 2013 to cater to those who want to become Masorti rabbis and serve European communities. The Zacharias Frankel College is based at the University of Potsdam and offers a five-year course in English. It is associated with the School of Jewish Theology at the University of Potsdam and the Ziegler School of Rabbinic Studies of the American Jewish University in Los Angeles. The college is named for Rabbi Zacharias Frankel, who provided the foundational principles of what is now Masorti/Conservative Judaism.

=== Masorti AmLat ===
Masorti AmLat is the largest and fastest-growing region of Masorti Olami. It contains more than 70 congregations in eleven Latin American countries from Mexico to Argentina as well as NOAM Olami and Marom chapters. In 2017, Masorti AmLat began an organizational renewal titled "Hitjadshut" to boost its networking and cooperation across the region. This region has seen a recent proliferation of successful programs, some examples of which include:

- Tikunea - Rooted in the Jewish value of Tikkun Olam, Tikunea provides services to those in need including a soup kitchen as well as clothing, a library, yoga, theatre, and group therapy. Tikkunea was founded by the Weitzman Comunidad Educative-Adat Israel in Buenos Aires.
- Bet El 3.0 - Comunidad Bet El of Mexico aims to shape the next generation of leaders and volunteers for their community by mobilizing young adults and newlywed couples. Participants from Bet El spent months in training sessions culminating in a trip to Israel organized by Masorti Olami and Marom where they met leaders of NGOs, startups, social projects, and the Masorti movement and learned how to start and implement initiatives for their community in Mexico.
- YESH! aims to engage young adults in the Jewish community at the critical 18-35 age range. Participants take several trips together during the year and YESH! creates a space to discuss their needs and priorities within the Jewish community. YESH! is a collaboration between Marom and Masorti in Argentina.
- Shituf is the name of the annual Masorti AmLat gathering, focused on joint movement building and training of all member countries, communities, and leaders. Shituf 2019 happened in Montevideo, Uruguay between June 13 and 15 with approximately 100 participants. Shituf 2020 and 2021 took place virtually. Shituf 2021 was opened by the President of Israel, Isaac Herzog.

=== Masorti Former Soviet Union ===
Masorti Olami is helping with the renaissance of Jewish life in the Former Soviet Union. Masorti Ukraine currently consists of communities in Kyiv, Chernivtsi and Odessa as well as minyanim in Kharkov, Lvov and Berdychiv. The Masoret Kyiv Community was formed when Ukraine native Rabbi Reuven Stamov was installed as the first Masorti Rabbi in the Former Soviet Union.

Masorti Ukraine has extensive and expanding youth activities. There is a Jewish school in Chernivtsi and Schechter Institute of Jewish Studies have held Camp Ramah Yachad in Ukraine for over twenty years. In 2018, NOAM Ukraine opened its first NOAM Winter Camp and the Masoret Kyiv Community hosts an annual family camp where children and parents can learn, experience traditional Jewish life, and worship together.

Masorti Ukraine collaborates with Rabbi Chaim Weiner and Rabbi Shlomo Zacharow to pioneer the first Conservative Hashgacha in Ukraine. Masorti Ukraine continues to bring traditional Judaism back to Ukraine and connect Jews to their roots in a meaningful and modern way.

=== Masorti Australasia ===
Australia is the newest frontier for the Masorti movement. Masorti Australia comprises two congregations, Emanuel Synagogue in Sydney and Kehillat Nitzan in Melbourne, and has great possibilities for expansion in the future. Additional bonds are being fostered with Masorti India, having communities in Mumbai, New Delhi, Alibaug and Ahmedabad.

=== Masorti Africa ===
Masorti Africa consists of a community in Johannesburg, South Africa and approximately 2,500 Abayudaya Jews spread across Uganda and Kenya. The Abayudaya Jewish community in Eastern Uganda and Kenya numbers approximately 2,500 members and has eight synagogues and schools in villages around Mbale, Uganda, and in the Ugandan capital Kampala. The community was founded in the early 20th century by Semei Kakungulu, a Ugandan military leader who discovered Judaism after breaking away from Christianity following a fallout with the British colonial authorities. The Abayudaya community formally converted to Judaism in 2002 under the auspices of the Conservative Movement. The community is active, performs its own shechitah, have their own schools and NOAM Olami youth groups and send participants to study at the Conservative Yeshiva and to take part in Onward NOAM Olami. Many members of the Abayudaya have tried to make Aliya to Israel and Masorti Olami has attempted to support them in doing this. However, Israel's high court has consistently denied the community's ability to do so. Masorti Olami filed a petition on behalf of Yosef Kibita, a Ugandan Jew who had his Aliya denied.

=== Shlichim ===
Masorti Olami sends professional Masorti Shlichim (emissaries) from Israel to serve in Latin America, Europe, and Africa, as well as volunteers to Australia, Spain, Prague, UK, and Africa. In order to train and further educate future leaders of Conservative and Masorti communities, Masorti Olami operates a program to send interested rabbinical school students from the Jewish Theological Seminary of America - during their year of study in Israel - to assist in leading Masorti kehillot in places such as Europe. Masorti Olami also partners with the Schechter Rabbinical Seminary in Jerusalem in sponsoring and placing these rabbinical students in France, Germany, Spain, Ukraine, and other locations.

Masorti Olami partners with the International Rabbinical Assembly in its service to Latin American and European regions rabbis. Masorti rabbis serve more than 80 diverse kehillot in Argentina, Chile, Uruguay, Brazil, Peru, Venezuela, Colombia, El Salvador, England, France, Germany, Hungary, Switzerland, Sweden, Czech Republic, Ukraine, Russia, Australia, South Africa, Uganda, China, Japan and elsewhere.

== Youth and young adults organizations ==
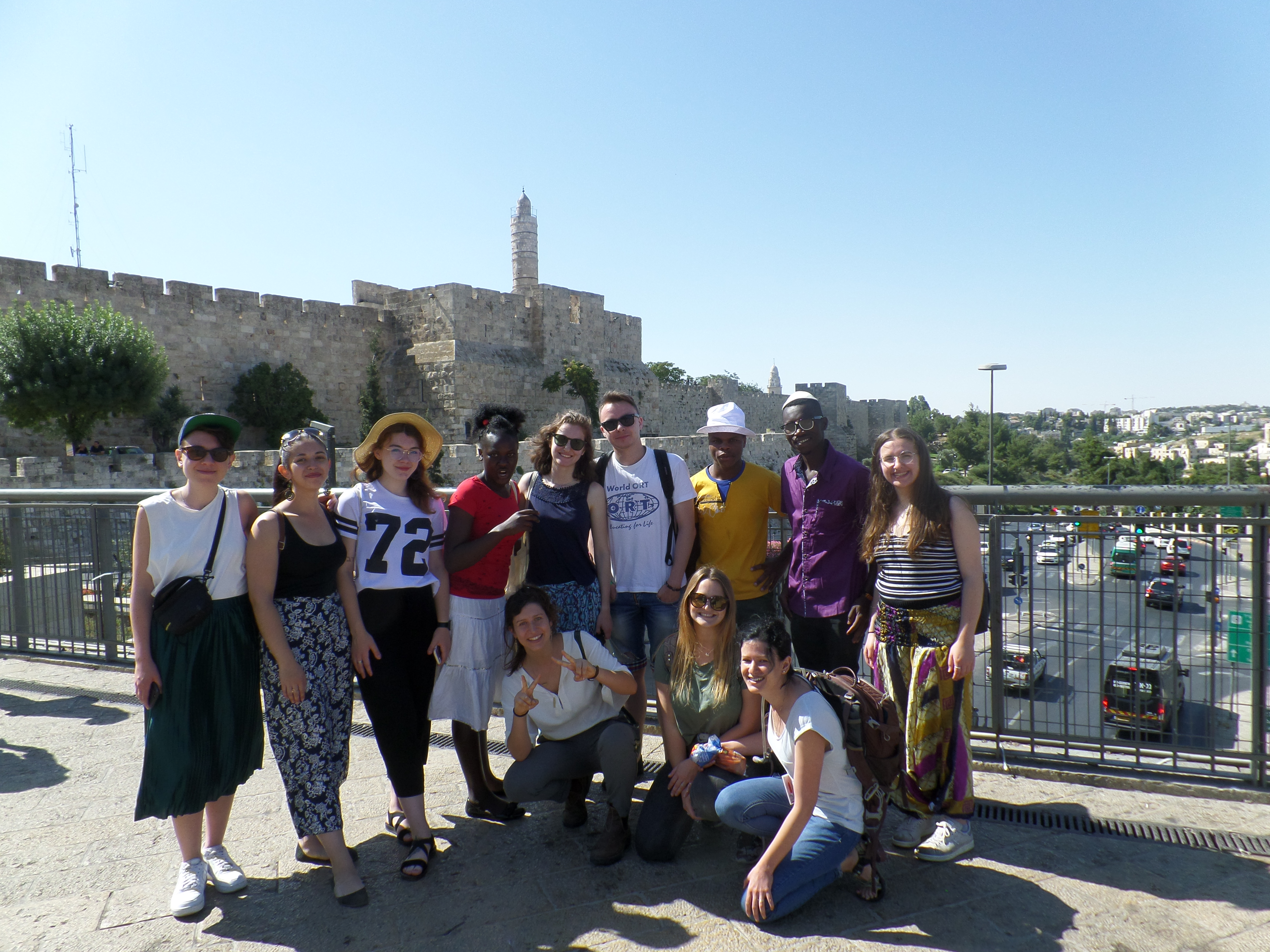
Masorti youth leaders from six countries intern in Jerusalem each summer while learning to become leaders of the NOAM youth movement.

NOAM (Noar Masorti) is the youth movement of Masorti Olami which is active in Latin America, Europe, Israel, the Former Soviet Union, and in North America where it is known as USY (United Synagogue Youth). NOAM operates under the umbrella of Masorti Olami with activities for young people aged 8 to 18. Summer camps operating in a similar fashion to the Camp Ramah movement occur in Argentina, Brazil, Chile, Ukraine, and the United Kingdom. See also Zionist youth movement.

MAROM (Mercaz Ruchani u'Masorti) is a network for groups of Masorti young adults aged 18–30 that exists in more than 12 countries throughout Europe, Latin America, and the Former Soviet Union. MAROM facilitates meetings, coordinates festivals, and runs holiday celebrations, as well as provides regional and national level conferences, leadership training and seminars for future rabbis, educators and lay leaders. Marom "aims to enrich and inspire their participants with values of Zionism and a meaningful Jewish life, through significant experiences in Israel and around the world".

== Partnerships ==
Masorti Olami has representation in a number of national/international Jewish organizations, including the World Zionist Organization, Jewish Agency for Israel and Keren Kayemeth Le’Yisrael (JNF) via MERCAZ. Masorti Olami also works with other global organizations such as Marom, the movement's organization for young adults, and MERCAZ Olami, the movement's Zionist organization, and NOAM Olami, the movement's youth group.

North American partner organizations include: United Synagogue of Conservative Judaism, Camp Ramah, United Synagogue Youth, Jewish Theological Seminary of America, Ziegler School of Rabbinic Studies, Schechter Day School Network, The William Davidson School, Rabbinical Assembly, Cantors Assembly, JEA (Jewish Educators Assembly), FJMC (Federation of Jewish Men's Clubs), WLCJ (Women's League for Conservative Judaism), NAASE (North American Association for Synagogue Executives), Mercaz USA, Canadian Foundation for Masorti Judaism, Jewish Youth Directors Association, Masorti on Campus, Masorti Foundation for Conservative Judaism in Israel.

Latin American partner organizations include: Seminario Rabínico Latinoamericano, AmLat, AJL (Asamblea de Jazanim Latinoamericanos).

European and Former Soviet Union partner organizations include: Zacharias Frankel College, Tali France, EAJL (European Academy for Jewish Liturgy), Midreshet Yerushalayim, ERA (European Rabbinical Assembly), Masorti Judaism (UK).

Israeli partner organizations include: Schechter Institute of Jewish Studies, Conservative Yeshiva, Hannaton Educational Center, TALI Schools, Midreshet Yerushalayim, Marom Israel, Masorti Movement in Israel, Ramah Israel.
