= Olami (organization) =

Jewish youth outreach program

- Founded: 2001; 25 years ago
- Type: 501(c)3
- Location: 300+ chapters
- Services: Meor; JBiz
- Key people: Rabbi Mordechai Deutsche (CEO) (as of 2017)
- Parent organization: Mosaic United
- Website: olami.org/about/

Olami (Hebrew: עולמי, lit. 'global') is a Orthodox Jewish network of youth outreach programs. It is targeted primarily towards students on college campuses by offering a variety of religious and educational services to its Jewish student body. As of 2026, it operates more than 300 chapters in more than 30 countries.

== History ==
Olami was founded in 2001 as an initiative to connect with Jewish students across college campuses. It seeks to "counter assimilation" by providing religious education and experiences to diaspora Jewish youth.

Olami Worldwide, the service-based organization, is financed by its parent nonprofit, the Olami Foundation. The network received significant funding from Mosaic United, a venture by Naftali Bennett through Israel's Ministry of Diaspora Affairs and Combating Antisemitism.

The organization also provides funding through the Olami Foundation to startups under its "initiative incubator" to increase Jewish learning. As of 2017, has provided tens of thousands of dollars per startup to more than 60 initiatives.

As of 2017, its CEO was Rabbi Mordechai Deutsche In the 2022 academic year, it provided services to 60,000 students.

== Meor ==
Its flagship affiliate program, Meor (Hebrew: מאור, lit. 'illumination') offers religious lessons and opportunities at colleges and universities, and was first established at the University of Pennsylvania in 2005 by Rabbi Shmuel Lynn. As of 2026, Meor was active on 21 college campuses and educated more than 4,000 student participants. It also provides religious services on the Sabbath and educational trips to Israel. Since 2008, Meor's Poland division has offered global attendees subsidized education trips to learn about the Holocaust by visiting Auschwitz.

== See also ==
- Hillel International
- Chabad on Campus
