= Marom Israel =

Marom is the Masorti movement’s (Conservative Judaism) organization for students and young adults, providing activities based on religious pluralism and Jewish content.

== Overview ==
Marom was founded in 1995 by a group of Israeli university students who felt the need for a pluralistic religious framework for young adults within the framework of the Masorti movement.

Marom is a platform for a wide cross-section of Israelis with an open, traditional outlook, allowing them to share experiences and develop their sense of belonging to the Jewish people. It also provides a framework for members to influence change in Israeli society with their views and beliefs. Marom organizes activities in the spirit of traditional Judaism, Zionism and democracy, on campuses, in Masorti congregations, and in other locations around the country.

Through its programming, Marom opens up the pluralistic, Zionist, open and inclusive beliefs of the Masorti Movement to students and young adults, reaching across the religious-secular divide and drawing in new immigrants. Marom also serves as a training ground for future leaders, both within the Movement and in Israeli society.

Marom is actively involved in the absorption of student immigrants, holding joint activities with organizations of student "Olim". Marom provides a natural home for immigrants from South and North America, who are already well acquainted with Conservative Judaism.

Marom complements Masorti in Israel by providing a bridge for young people, graduates of NOAM and other youth frameworks. In effect, Marom is the young community of the Movement, from which spring many of its future leaders, such as its student rabbi members. Marom offers a forum for students and young adults who wish to express their Judaism in ways that are unavailable in any other organization. Marom serves as a testing ground for non-affiliated young native-Israeli and immigrant Jews to find their place within Judaism.

== Goals and Objectives ==
1. To provide a community for students and young adults of the Masorti Movement.

2. To spread the Masorti message of pluralism, openness and equality among the members’ peers.

3. To strengthen the level of volunteerism and giving back to the community of its members, through the undertaking of "Tikun Olam" projects.

4. To assist with immigrant absorption, especially of student olim.

5. To provide monthly regional and national events on campuses and in other locations.

Activities include: meetings to discuss religious texts held in cafés; weekends of study, prayer and social activities; joint events, especially on campus, with other organizations; celebration of festivals; panels and lectures; Tikun Olam projects; aiding immigrant absorption projects.
