= Seminario Rabínico Latinoamericano =

Seminario Rabínico Latinoamericano (Latin American Rabbinical Seminary, also known as the Marshall T. Meyer Latin American Rabbinical Seminary) is a Jewish religious, cultural, and academic center in Buenos Aires, Argentina, whose primary purpose is to educate and ordain rabbis from Latin America who will help to strengthen and sustain Jewish communities throughout the region. Founded in 1962 by Rabbi Marshall T. Meyer, it is part of a system of Jewish religious education that operate under the auspices of the Judaism's Conservative movement (also known, largely outside of the United States, as the Masorti Movement).

More than eighty rabbis have graduated and been ordained by this seminary since its creation, including nine female rabbis. These rabbis work in Jewish communities throughout Latin America, including Argentina, Bolivia, Brazil, Chile, Costa Rica, Colombia, Ecuador, Dominican Republic, Mexico, Paraguay, Peru, Puerto Rico, El Salvador, Uruguay and Venezuela. Other graduates work in areas outside of Latin America, including Israel and the United States.

The Seminary is an "educational affiliate" of the Jewish Theological Seminary of America, located in New York City.

== Educational programs ==
The primary program for educating and ordaining rabbis, named after Abraham Joshua Heschel, is complemented by a series of other Jewish study programs, including:

- Upper Education Institute of Jewish Studies (Instituto Superior de Estudios Judaicos "Mijlelet Abarbanel")
- Hazanim and Singing Teachers School (Escuela de Jazanim y Mestros de Canto "Bet Asaf")
- Puzzle (Arkavá), courses for adults focusing on ethical questions, along with a separate track for teenagers 15–17 years old, with a goal of relating traditional Jewish sources to contemporary issues

The Seminary also includes training institutes to prepare scribes (sofarim) to write religious documents such as Torah scrolls and parchments for mezuzot, and mohalim who can perform religious circumcision ceremonies (brit milah).

== Library ==
The library, housing the most complete collection of Jewish studies materials in Latin America, contains approximately 50,000 volumes in numerous languages, including (in addition to Hebrew) English, French, German, Italian, Spanish, and Yiddish.

== Awards ==
The Seminary received the Zalman Shazar award for educational institutes studying the Diaspora in May 1996, an award considered to be "one of the most prestigious awards in the Jewish world."
