= Schechter Institute of Jewish Studies =

Israeli academic institution

Coordinates: 31.7704°N 35.2044°E

- Type: Graduate School of Jewish Studies
- Established: 1984
- Affiliations: Pluralistic Judaism
- President: Prof. Ari Ackerman
- Academic staff: Dean: Dr. Sarah Schwartz
- Location: Jerusalem
- Campus: Jerusalem and Tel Aviv
- Website: www.schechter.edu www.schechter.ac.il

Schechter Institute of Jewish Studies (Hebrew: מכון שכטר למדעי היהדות, Machon Schechter), located in the Neve Granot neighborhood of Jerusalem, is an Israeli academic institution.

== History ==
Founded in 1984 by the Jewish Theological Seminary (New York) and Israel's Masorti Movement as a rabbinical seminary known as "The Seminary of Judaic Studies," the Schechter Institute has been located since 1990 in Neve Granot, a neighborhood behind the Israel Museum.

Schechter is the only academic institution in Israel devoted entirely to Jewish studies and to fostering a pluralistic approach to Jewish-Israeli identity through education, the arts and community leadership.

The Schechter Institute has more than 600 students, 300 in the M.A. programs and 300 in non-degree studies, specializing in ten Jewish study tracks or programs including Judaism and the Arts, Midrash and Aggadah, Land of Israel, and classical Jewish disciplines such as Bible, Talmud, Midrash, and Jewish Thought. A new program, Meirav, is an inter-disciplinary program combining study of classical Jewish Textual Midrash, Talmud, Bible for an M.A. degree. Its YAMAH Community Leadership M.A. program combines Jewish studies education practices with practical tools for building strong community-based professional leadership. Its Mishlei M.A. program strengthens the connection between the academic study of Judaism and practical community works. Its Marpeh program, unique to Israel, combines Chaplaincy with a degree in Family and Community Studies.

Two new programs Bibliotherapy and Psychodrama place these two forms of therapy within the Jewish tradition using Jewish texts as the basis for counselling.

The Schechter Institute has 49 full- and part-time faculty members and approximately 2,000 M.A. graduates. Many work in the Israeli school system as principals and teachers, in the Israel Ministry of Education in management positions, including curriculum planning, or in the nationwide Community Center Association.

Schechter Institute research centers include the Center for Women and Jewish Law, the Center for Judaism and the Arts, and the Center for Applied Jewish Law, and the Midrash Project which publish several books annually in diverse fields of Jewish studies. Schechter also co-publishes Nashim, the Journal of Jewish Women’s Studies, in partnership with Brandeis University and Indiana University Press.

The Schechter campus in Jerusalem, in addition to its graduate school, is home to the Schechter Rabbinical Seminary for ordination of rabbis, TALI Education Fund and Midreshet Schechter. Midreshe Schechter operates Neve Schechter, the Center for Contemporary Jewish Culture in the historic former Cafe Lorenz building in Tel Aviv's Neve Tzedek neighborhood. Midreshet Schechter Ukraine operates camps, schools and synagogues / Jewish Community Centers, in conjunction with Masorti Olami.

== Notable faculty ==
- David Golinkin, Talmud and Jewish Law
- Moshe Benovitz, Talmud and Jewish Law
- Shamma Friedman, Talmud

== See also ==
- Education in Israel
- Religion in Israel
