= Conservative Judaism =

Jewish religious movement

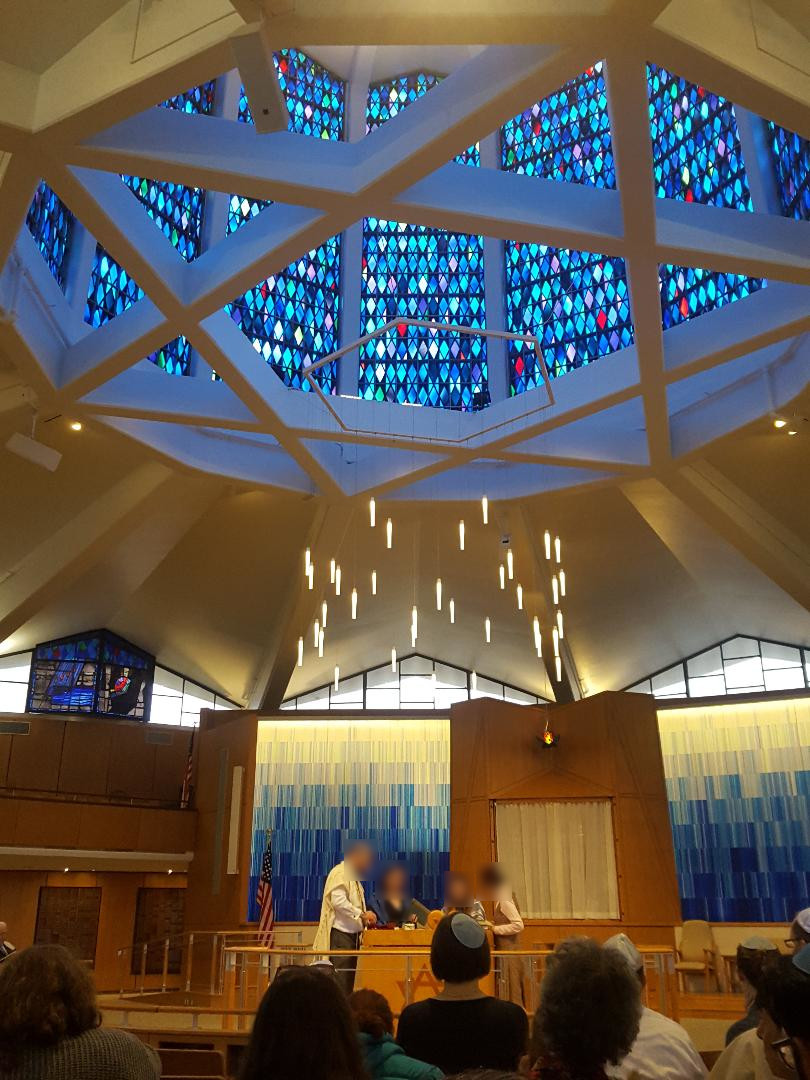
Morning service in synagogue Adath Israel, Merion Station, Pennsylvania

Conservative Judaism, also known as Masorti Judaism, (Note: Hebrew: יהדות מסורתית, romanized: Yahadut Masortit) is a Jewish religious movement that regards the authority of Jewish law and tradition as emanating primarily from the assent of the people through the generations, more than from divine revelation. It therefore views Jewish law, or Halakha, as both binding and subject to historical development. The Conservative rabbinate employs modern historical-critical research, rather than only traditional methods and sources, and lends great weight to its constituency, when determining its stance on matters of practice. The movement considers its approach as the authentic and most appropriate continuation of Halakhic discourse, maintaining both fealty to received forms and flexibility in their interpretation. It also eschews strict theological definitions, lacking a consensus in matters of faith and allowing great pluralism.

While regarding itself as the heir of Rabbi Zecharias Frankel's 19th-century positive-historical school in Europe, Conservative Judaism only became fully institutionalized during the mid-20th century, in the United States. Its largest center is in North America, where its main congregational arm is the United Synagogue of Conservative Judaism, and the New York–based Jewish Theological Seminary of America operates as its largest rabbinic seminary. Globally, affiliated communities are united within the umbrella organization Masorti Olami. Conservative Judaism is the third-largest Jewish religious movement worldwide, estimated to represent close to 1.1 million people, including over 600,000 registered adult congregants and many non-member identifiers.

== Theology ==
=== Attitude ===
Conservative Judaism was marked by ambivalence and ambiguity in all theological matters from its earliest stages. Rabbi Zecharias Frankel, considered its intellectual progenitor, believed the very notion of theology was alien to traditional Judaism. He was often accused of obscurity on the subject by his opponents, both Reform and Orthodox.

The American movement largely espoused a similar approach, and its leaders mostly avoided the field. Only in 1985 did a course about Conservative theology open in the Jewish Theological Seminary of America (JTS). The hitherto sole major attempt to define a clear credo was made in 1988, with the Statement of Principles Emet ve-Emunah (Truth and Belief) formulated and issued by the Leadership Council of Conservative Judaism. The introduction stated that "lack of definition was useful" in the past, but a need to articulate one now arose. The platform provided many statements citing key concepts such as God, revelation, and election, but also acknowledged that a variety of positions and convictions existed within its ranks, eschewing strict delineation of principles and often expressing conflicting views.

In a 1999 special edition of Conservative Judaism dedicated to the matter, leading rabbis Elliot N. Dorff and Gordon Tucker stated that "the great diversity" within the movement "makes the creation of a theological vision shared by all neither possible nor desirable".

=== God and eschatology ===
Conservative Judaism largely upholds the theistic notion of a personal God. Emet ve-Emunah stated, "We affirm our faith in God as the Creator and Governor of the universe. His power called the world into being; His wisdom and goodness guide its destiny." Concurrently, the platform also noted that his nature was "elusive" and subject to many options of belief. A naturalistic conception of divinity, regarding it as inseparable from the mundane world, once had an important place within the movement, especially represented by Mordecai Kaplan. After Kaplan's Reconstructionism fully coalesced into an independent movement, these views were marginalized.

A similarly inconclusive position is expressed toward other precepts. Most theologians adhere to the immortality of the soul, but while references to the resurrection of the dead are maintained, English translations of the prayers obscure the issue. In Emet, it was stated that death is not tantamount to the end of one's personality. Relating to the Messiah, the movement rephrased most petitions for the restoration of the sacrifices into past tense, rejecting a renewal of animal offerings, though not opposing a return to Zion and even a Third Temple. The 1988 platform announced that "some" believe in classic eschatology, but dogmatism in this matter was "philosophically unjustified". The notions of the election of Israel and God's covenant with it were basically retained as well.

=== Revelation ===
Conservative conception of revelation encompasses an extensive spectrum. Zecharias Frankel himself applied critical-scientific methods to analyze the stages in the development of the Oral Torah, pioneering modern study of the Mishnah. He regarded Chazal as innovators who added their own original contribution to the canon, not merely as expounders and interpreters of a legal system given in its entirety to Moses on Mount Sinai. Yet he also vehemently rejected utilizing these disciplines in the Pentateuch, maintaining it was beyond human reach and wholly celestial in origin. Frankel never elucidated his beliefs, and the exact correlation between human and divine in his thought is still subject to scholarly debate. A similar negative approach toward Higher Criticism, while accepting an evolutionary understanding of Oral Law, defined Rabbi Alexander Kohut, Solomon Schechter and the early generation of American Conservative Judaism. When JTS faculty began to embrace Biblical criticism in the 1920s, they adapted a consistent theological view: an original, verbal revelation did occur at Sinai, but the text itself was composed by later authors. The latter, classified by Dorff as a relatively moderate metamorphosis of the old one, is still espoused by few traditionalist right-wing Conservative rabbis, though it is marginalized among senior leadership.

A small but influential segment within the JTS and the movement adhered, from the 1930s, to Mordecai Kaplan's philosophy, denying any revelation but viewing all scripture as a purely human product. Along with other Reconstructionist tenets, it dwindled as the latter consolidated into a separate group. Kaplan's views and the permeation of Higher Criticism gradually swayed most Conservative thinkers towards a non-verbal understanding of theophany, which became dominant in the 1970s. This was in sync with the wider trend of lowering rates of Americans who accepted the Bible as the Word of God. Dorff categorized the proponents of this into two schools. One maintains that God projected some form of message that inspired the human authors of the Pentateuch to record what they perceived. The other is often strongly influenced by Franz Rosenzweig and other existentialists, but also attracted many Objectivists who consider human reason paramount. The second school states that God merely conferred his presence on those he influenced, without any communication, and the experience drove them to spiritual creativity.

While they differ in the theoretical level surrounding revelation, both practically regard all scripture and tradition as a human product with certain divine inspiration—providing an understanding that recognizes Biblical criticism and also justifies major innovation in religious conduct. The first doctrine, advocated by such leaders as rabbis Ben-Zion Bokser and Robert Gordis, largely imparted that some elements within tradition are fully divine, but determining which would be impractical, and therefore received forms of interpretation should be basically upheld. Exponents of the latter view, among them rabbis Louis Jacobs and Neil Gillman, also emphasized the encounter of God with the Jews as a collective and the role of Jewish authorities through the generations in determining what it implied. The stress on the supremacy of community and tradition, rather than individual consciousness, defines the entire spectrum of Conservative thought.

== Ideology ==
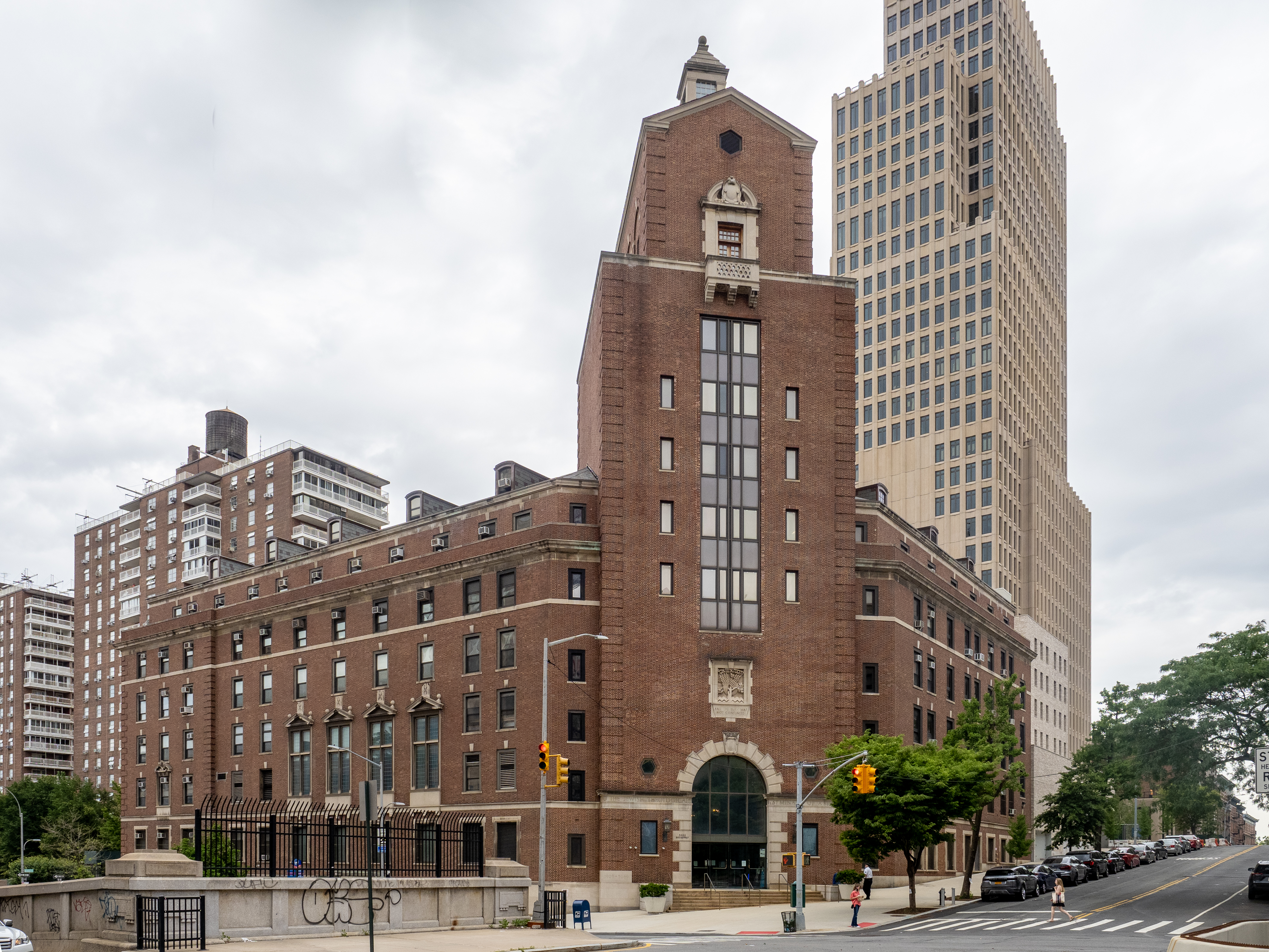
The Jewish Theological Seminary of America in New York City, the main rabbinical seminary of Conservative Judaism

The Conservative mainstay was the adoption of the historical-critical method in understanding Judaism and setting its future course. In accepting an evolutionary approach to the religion, as something that developed over time and absorbed considerable external influences, the movement distinguished between the original meaning implied in traditional sources and the manner they were grasped by successive generations, rejecting belief in an unbroken chain of interpretation from God's original Revelation, immune to any major extraneous effects. This evolutionary perception of religion, while relatively moderate in comparison with more radical modernizers—the scholarship of the Positive-Historical school, for example, sought to demonstrate the continuity and cohesiveness of Judaism over the years—still challenged Conservative leaders.

They regarded tradition and received mores with reverence, especially the continued adherence to the mechanism of Religious Law (Halakha), opposing indiscriminate modification, and emphasized they should be changed only with care and caution and remain observed by the people. Rabbi Louis Ginzberg, summarizing his movement's position, wrote:

We may now understand the apparent contradiction between theory and practice... One may conceive of the origin of Sabbath as the professor at university would, yet observe the smallest detail known to strict Orthodoxy... The sanctity of the Sabbath reposes not upon the fact that it was proclaimed on Sinai, but on the fact that it found for thousands of years its expression in Jewish souls. It is the task of the historian to examine the beginnings and developments of customs and observances; practical Judaism, on the other hand, is not concerned with origins but regards the institutions as they have come to be.

This discrepancy between scientific criticism and insistence on heritage had to be compensated by a conviction that would forestall either deviation from accepted norms or laxity and apathy.

A key doctrine which was to fulfil this capacity was the collective will of the Jewish people. Conservatives lent great weight in determining religious practice, both in historical precedent and as a means to shape present conduct. Zecharias Frankel pioneered this approach; as Michael A. Meyer commented, "the extraordinary status which he ascribed to the ingrained beliefs and practices of the community is probably the most original element of his thought." He turned it into a source of legitimacy for both change and preservation, but mostly the latter. The basic moderation and traditionalism of the majority among the people were to guarantee a sense of continuity and unity, restraining the guiding rabbis and scholars who at his age were intent on reform but also allowing them manoeuvrability in adopting or discarding certain elements. Solomon Schechter espoused a similar position. He turned the old rabbinic concept of K'lal Yisrael, which he translated as "Catholic Israel", into a comprehensive worldview. For him, the details of divine Revelation were of secondary significance, as historical change dictated its interpretation through the ages notwithstanding: "The centre of authority is actually removed from the Bible", he surmised, "and placed in some living body... in touch with the ideal aspirations and the religious needs of the age, best able to determine... This living body, however, is not represented by... Priesthood, or Rabbihood, but by the collective conscience of Catholic Israel."

The scope, limits and role of this corpus were a matter for contention in Conservative ranks. Schechter himself used it to oppose any major break with either traditionalist or progressive elements within American Jewry of his day, while some of his successors argued that the idea became obsolete due to the great alienation of many from received forms, that had to be countered by innovative measures to draw them back. The Conservative rabbinate often vacillated on to which degree may the non-practicing, religiously apathetic strata be included as a factor within Catholic Israel, providing impulse for them in determining religious questions; even avant-garde leaders acquiesced that the majority could not serve that function. Right-wing critics often charged that the movement allowed its uncommitted laity an exaggerated role, conceding to its demands and successively stretching halakhic boundaries beyond any limit.

The Conservative leadership had limited success in imparting their worldview to the general public. While the rabbinate perceived itself as bearing a unique, original conception of Judaism, the masses lacked much interest, regarding it mainly as a compromise offering a channel for religious identification that was more traditional than Reform Judaism yet less strict than Orthodoxy. Only a low percentage of Conservative congregants actively pursue an observant lifestyle: in the mid-1980s, Charles Liebman and Daniel J. Elazar calculated that barely 3 to 4 per cent held to one quite thoroughly. This gap between principle and the public, more pronounced than in any other Jewish movement, is often credited at explaining the decline of the Conservative movement. While some 41 per cent of American Jews identified with it in the 1970s, it had shrunk to an estimated 18 per cent (and 11 per cent among those under 30) in 2013.

== Jewish law ==
=== Role ===
Fidelity and commitment to Halakha, while subject to criticism as disingenuous both from within and without, were and remain a cornerstone doctrine of Conservative Judaism. The movement views the legalistic system as normative and binding, and believes Jews must practically observe its precepts, like Sabbath, dietary ordinances, ritual purity, daily prayer with phylacteries and the like. Concurrently, examining Jewish history and rabbinic literature through the lens of academic criticism, it maintained that these laws were always subject to considerable evolution, and must continue to do so. Emet ve-Emunah titled its chapter on the subject with "The Indispensability of Halakha", stating that "Halakha in its developing form is an indispensable element of a traditional Judaism which is vital and modern." Conservative Judaism regards itself as the authentic inheritor of a flexible legalistic tradition, charging the Orthodox with petrifying the process and Reform with abandoning it.

The tension between "tradition and change"—which were also the motto adopted by the movement since the 1950s—and the need to balance them were always a topic of intense debate within Conservative Judaism. In its early stages, the leadership opposed pronounced innovation, mostly adopting a relatively rigid position. Mordecai Kaplan's Reconstructionism raised the demand for thoroughgoing modification without much regard for the past or Halakhic considerations, but senior rabbis opposed him vigorously. Even in the 1940s and 1950s, when Kaplan's influence grew, his superiors, rabbis Louis Ginzberg, Louis Finkelstein and Saul Lieberman, espoused a conservative line. Since the 1970s, with the strengthening of the liberal wing within the movement, the majority in the Rabbinic Assembly opted for radical reformulations in religious conduct, but rejected the Reconstructionist Non-Halakhic approach, insisting that the legalistic method be maintained. The Halakhic commitment of Conservative Judaism has been subject to much criticism, from within and without. Right-wing discontents, including the Union for Traditional Judaism which seceded in protest of the 1983 resolution to ordain women rabbis—adopted at an open vote, where all JTS faculty regardless of qualification were counted—contested the validity of this description, as well as progressives like Rabbi Neil Gillman, who exhorted the movement to cease describing itself as Halakhic in 2005, stating that after repeated concessions, "Our original claim has died a death by a thousand qualifications... It has lost all factual meaning."

The main body entrusted with formulating rulings, responsa and statues is the Committee on Jewish Law and Standards (CJLS), a panel with 25 voting legalistic specialists and further 11 observers. There is also the smaller Va'ad ha-Halakha (Law Committee) of Israel's Masorti Movement. Every responsa must receive a minimum of six voters to be considered an official position of the CJLS. Conservative Judaism explicitly acknowledges the principle of halakhic pluralism, enabling the panel to adopt more than one resolution in any given subject. The final authority in each Conservative community is the local rabbi, the Mara D'Atra (Lord of the Locality, in traditional terms), enfranchised to adopt either minority or majority opinions from the CJLS or maintain local practice. Thus, on the issue of admitting openly homosexual rabbinic candidates, the Committee approved two resolutions, one in favour and one against; the JTS took the lenient position, while the Seminario Rabinico Latinoamericano still adheres to the latter. Likewise, while most Conservative synagogues approved of egalitarianism for women in religious life, some still maintain traditional gender roles and do not count women for prayer quorums.

=== Characteristics ===
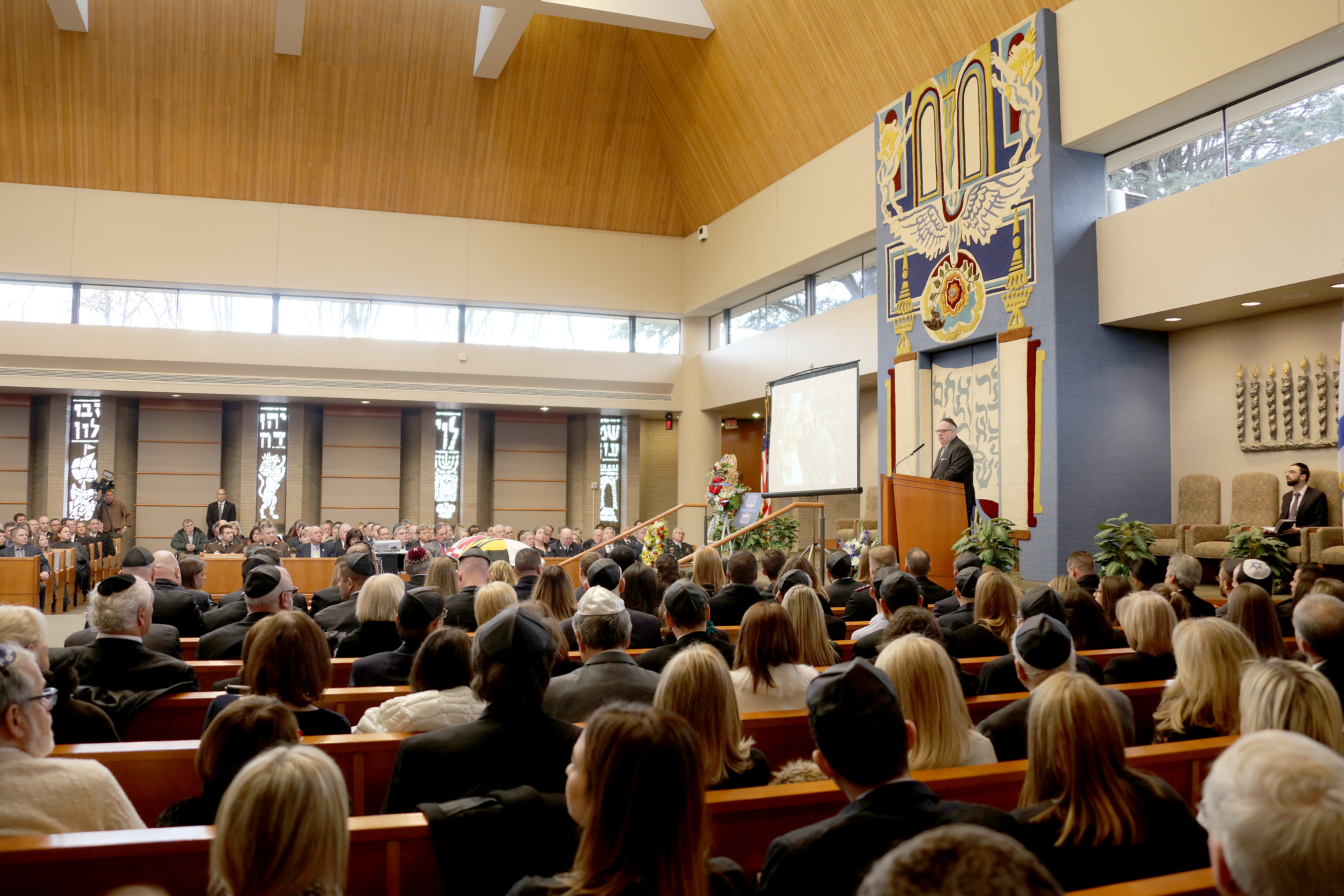
Memorial service of B'nai Israel Congregation (Rockville, Maryland)

The Conservative treatment of Halakha is defined by several features, though the entire range of its Halakhic discourse cannot be sharply distinguished from either the Traditional or Orthodox one. Rabbi David Golinkin, who attempted to classify its parameters, stressed that quite often rulings merely reiterate conclusions reached in older sources or even Orthodox ones. For example, in the details of preparing Sabbath ritual enclosures, it draws directly on the opinions of the Shulchan Aruch and Rabbi Hayim David HaLevi. Another tendency prevalent among the movement's rabbis, yet again not particular to it, is the adoption of the more lenient positions on the matters at question—though this is not universal, and responsa also took stringent ones not infrequently.

A more distinctive characterization is a greater proclivity to base rulings on earlier sources, in the Rishonim or before them, as far back as the Talmud. Conservative decisors frequently resort to less canonical sources, isolated responsa or minority opinions. They demonstrate more fluidity in regards to established precedent and continuum in rabbinic literature, mainly those by the later authorities, and lay little stress on the perceived hierarchy between major and minor legalists of the past. They are far more inclined to contend (machloket) with old rulings, to be flexible towards custom or to wholly disregard it. This is especially expressed in less hesitancy to rule against or notwithstanding the major codifications of Jewish Law, like Mishneh Torah, Arba'ah Turim and especially the Shulchan Aruch with its Isserles Gloss and later commentaries. Conservative authorities, while often relying on the Shulchan Aruch themselves, criticize the Orthodox for relatively rarely venturing beyond it and overly canonizing Rabbi Joseph Karo's work. In several occasions, Conservative rabbis discerned that the Shulchan Aruch ruled without firm precedent, sometimes deriving his conclusions from the Kabbalah. An important example is the ruling of Rabbi Golinkin—contrary to the majority consensus among the Acharonim and the more prominent Rishonim, but based on many opinions of the lesser Rishonim which is derived from a minority view in the Talmud—that the Sabbatical Year is not obligatory in present times at all (neither de'Oraita nor de'Rabanan) but rather an act of piety.

Ethical considerations and the weight due to them in determining halakhic issues, mainly to what degree may modern sensibilities shape the outcome, are subject to much discourse. Right-wing decisors, like Rabbi Joel Roth, maintained that such elements are naturally a factor in formulating conclusions, but may not alone serve as a justification for adopting a position. The majority, however, basically subscribed to the opinion evinced already by Rabbi Seymour Siegel in the 1960s, that the cultural and ethical norms of the community, the contemporary equivalents of Talmudic Aggadah, should supersede the legalistic forms when the two came into conflict and there was a pivotal ethical concern. Rabbi Elliot Dorff concluded that in contrast to the Orthodox, Conservative Judaism maintains that the juridical details and processes mainly serve higher moral purposes and could be modified if they no longer do so: "In other words, the Aggadah should control the Halakha." The liberal Rabbi Gordon Tucker, along with Gillman and other progressives, supported a far-reaching implementation of this approach, making Conservative Judaism much more Aggadic and allowing moral priorities an overriding authority at all occasions. This idea became very popular among the young generation, but it was not fully embraced either. In the 2006 resolution on homosexuals, the CJLS chose a middle path: they agreed that the ethical consideration of human dignity was of supreme importance, but not sufficient to uproot the express Biblical prohibition on not to lie with mankind as with womankind (traditionally understood as banning full anal intercourse). All other limitations, including on other forms of sexual relations, were lifted. A similar approach is manifest in the great weight ascribed to sociological changes in deciding religious policy. The CJLS and the Rabbinical Assembly members frequently state that circumstances were profoundly transformed in modern times, fulfilling the criteria mandating new rulings in various fields (based on general talmudic principles like Shinui ha-I'ttim, "Change of Times"). This, along with the ethical aspect, was a main argument for revolutionizing the role of women in religious life and embracing egalitarianism.

The most distinctive feature of Conservative legalistic discourse, in which it is conspicuously and sharply different from Orthodoxy, is the incorporation of critical-scientific methods into the process. Deliberations almost always delineate the historical development of the specific issue at hand, from the earliest known mentions until modern times. This approach enables a thorough analysis of the manner in which it was practiced, accepted, rejected or modified in various periods, not necessarily in sync with the received rabbinic understanding. Archaeology, philology and Judaic Studies are employed; rabbis use comparative compendiums of religious manuscripts, sometimes discerning that sentences were only added later or include spelling, grammar and transcription errors, changing the entire understanding of certain passages. This critical approach is central to the movement, for its historicist underpinning stresses that all religious literature has an original meaning relevant in the context of its formulation. This meaning may be analyzed and discerned, and is distinct from the later interpretations ascribed by traditional commentators. Decisors are also far more prone to include references to external scientific sources in relevant fields, like veterinarian publications in Halakhic matters concerning livestock.

Conservative authorities, as part of their promulgation of a dynamic Halakha, often cite the manner in which the sages of old used rabbinic statutes (Takkanah) that enabled the bypassing of prohibitions in the Pentateuch, like the Prozbul or Heter I'ska. In 1948, when employing those was first debated, Rabbi Isaac Klein argued that since there was no consensus on leadership within Catholic Israel, formulation of significant takkanot should be avoided. Another proposal, to ratify them only with a two-thirds majority in the RA, was rejected. New statues require a simple majority, 13 supporters among the 25 members of the CJLS. In the 1950s and 1960s, such drastic measures—as Rabbi Arnold M. Goodman cited in a 1996 writ allowing members of the priestly caste to marry divorcees, "Later authorities were reluctant to assume such unilateral authority... fear that invoking this principle would create the proverbial slippery slope, thereby weakening the entire halakhic structure... thus imposed severe limitations on the conditions and situations where it would be appropriate"—were carefully drafted as temporal, emergency ordinances (Horaat Sha'ah), grounded on the need the avoid a total rift of many nonobservant Jews. Later on, these ordinances became accepted and permanent on the practical level. The Conservative movement issued a wide range of new, thoroughgoing statues, from the famous 1950 responsum that allowed driving to the synagogue on the Sabbath and up to the 2000 decision to ban rabbis from inquiring about whether someone was a mamzer, de facto abolishing this legal category.

=== Rulings and policies ===
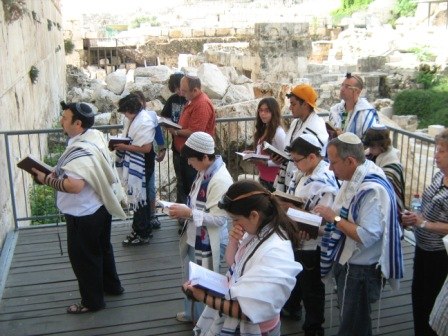
An egalitarian Conservative service at Robinson's Arch, Western Wall

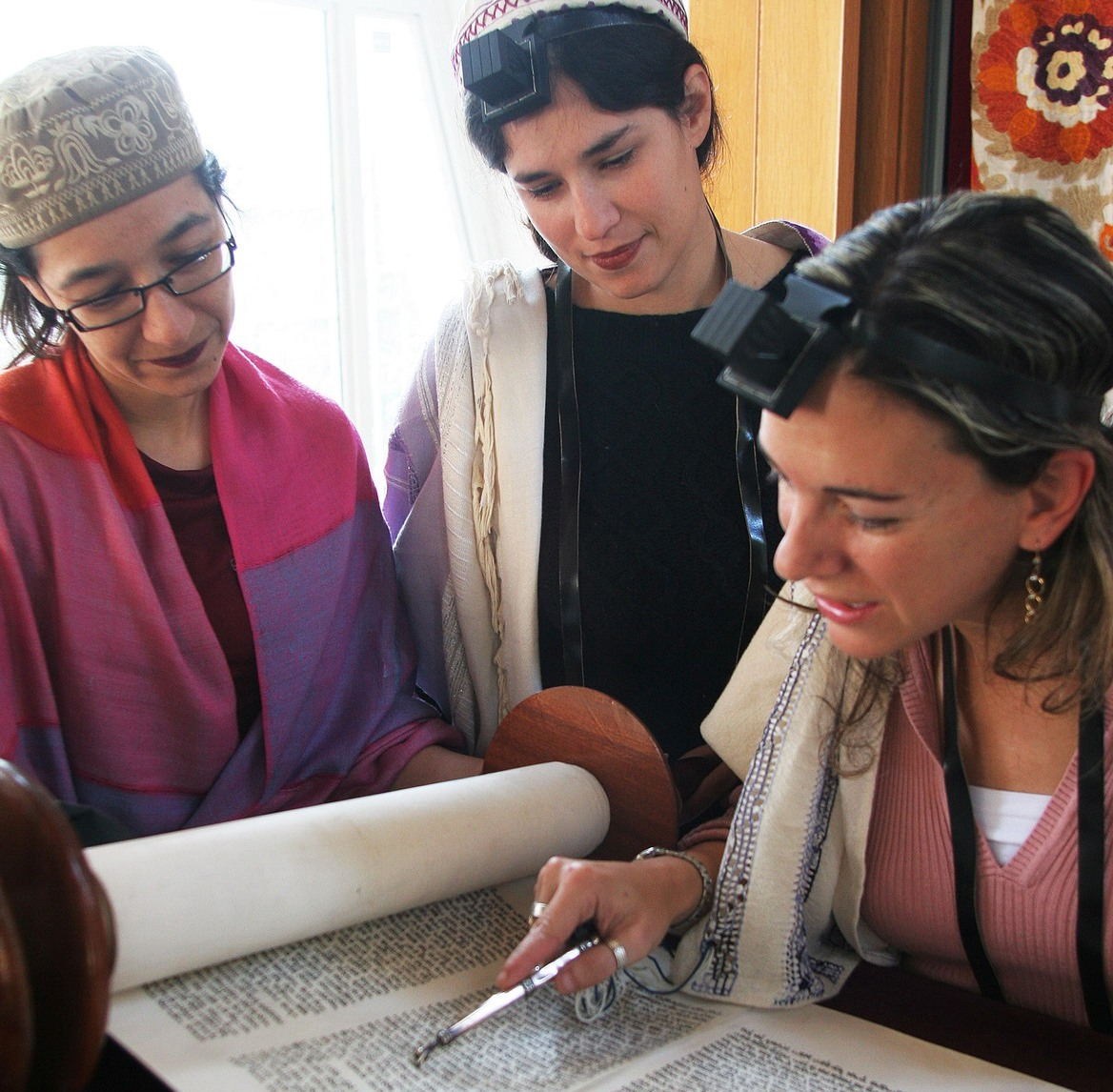
Women rabbis, Israel

Over the years, the RA and CJLS decided many things, shaping a distinctive profile for Conservative practice and worship. In the 1940s, when the public demanded mixed seating in synagogues, some rabbis argued there was no precedent but obliged on the grounds of dire need. Others noted that archaeological research showed no mehitsot (gender partitions) in ancient synagogues. Mixed seating became commonplace in almost all congregations.

In 1950, it was ruled that using electricity (that is, closure of an electrical circuit) did not constitute kindling a fire unto itself, not even in incandescent bulbs, and therefore was not a forbidden labour and could be done on the Sabbath. On that basis, while performing banned labours is forbidden—for example, video recording is still considered writing—switching lights and other functions are allowed. However, the RA strongly urges adherents to keep the sanctity of the Sabbath (refraining from doing anything that may imitate the atmosphere of weekdays, like loud noise reminiscent of work).

The need to encourage arrival at synagogue also motivated the CJLS, during the same year, to issue a temporal statue allowing driving on that day, for that purpose alone; it was supported by decreeing that the combustion of fuel did not serve any of the acts prohibited during the construction of the Tabernacle, and could therefore be classified, according to their interpretation of the Tosafists' opinion, as "redundant labour" (Sh’eina Tzricha L’gufa) and be permitted. The validity of this argument was heavily disputed within the movement. In 1952, members of the priestly caste were allowed to marry divorcees, conditioned on forfeiture of their privileges, as termination of marriage became widespread and women who underwent it could not be suspected of unsavory acts. In 1967, the ban on priests marrying converts was also lifted.

In 1954, the issue of agunot (women refused divorce by their husbands) was largely settled by adding a clause to the prenuptial contract under which men had to pay alimony as long as they did not concede. In 1968, this mechanism was replaced by a retroactive expropriation of the bride price, rendering the marriage void. In 1955, more girls were celebrating Bat Mitzvah and demanded to be allowed ascents to the Torah, the CJLS agreed that the ordinance under which women were banned from this due to respect for the congregation (Kvod ha'Tzibur) was no longer relevant. In 1972 it was decreed that rennet, even if derived from unclean animals, was so transformed that it constituted a wholly new item (Panim Chadashot ba'u l'Khan) and therefore all hard cheese could be considered kosher.

The 1970s and 1980s saw the emergence of women's rights on the main agenda. Growing pressure led the CJLS to adopt a motion that females may be counted as part of a quorum, based on the argument that only the Shulchan Aruch explicitly stated that it consist of men. While accepted, this was very controversial in the committee and heavily disputed. A more complete solution was offered in 1983 by Rabbi Joel Roth, and was also enacted to allow women rabbinic ordination. Roth noted that some decisors of old acknowledged that women may bless when performing positive time-bound commandments (from which they are exempted, and therefore unable to fulfill the obligation for others), especially citing the manner in which they assumed upon themselves the Counting of the Omer. He suggested that women voluntarily commit to pray thrice a day et cetera, and his responsa was adopted. Since then, female rabbis were ordained at JTS and other seminaries. In 1994, the movement accepted Judith Hauptman's principally egalitarian argument, according to which equal prayer obligations for women were never banned explicitly and it was only their inferior status that hindered participation. In 2006, openly gay rabbinic candidates were also to be admitted into the JTS. In 2012, a commitment ceremony for same-sex couples was devised, though not defined as kiddushin. In 2016, the rabbis passed a resolution supporting transgender rights.

Conservative Judaism in the United States held a relatively strict policy regarding intermarriage. Propositions for acknowledging Jews by patrilineal descent, as in the Reform movement, were overwhelmingly dismissed. Unconverted spouses were largely barred from community membership and participation in rituals; clergy are banned from any involvement in interfaith marriage on pain of dismissal. However, as the rate of such unions rose dramatically, Conservative congregations began describing gentile family members as K'rov Yisrael (Kin of Israel) and be more open toward them. The Leadership Council of Conservative Judaism stated in 1995: "we want to encourage the Jewish partner to maintain his/her Jewish identity, and raise their children as Jews."

Despite the centralization of legal deliberation on matters of Jewish law in the CJLS individual synagogues and communities must, in the end, depend on their local decision-makers. The rabbi in his or her or their community is regarded as the Mara D'Atra, or the local Halakhic decisor. Rabbis trained in the reading practices of Conservative Jewish approaches, historical evaluation of Jewish law and interpretation of Biblical and Rabbinic texts may align directly with the CJLS decisions or themselves opine on matters based on precedents or readings of text that shine light on congregants' questions. So, for instance, a rabbi may or may not choose to permit video streaming on Shabbat despite a majority ruling that allows for use of electronics. A local Mara D'Atra may rely on the reasoning found in the majority or minority opinions of the CJLS or have other textual and halakhic grounds, i.e., prioritizing Jewish values or legal concepts, to rule one way or another on matters of ritual, family life or sacred pursuits. This balance between a centralization of Halakhic authority and maintaining the authority of local rabbis reflects the commitment to pluralism at the heart of the Movement.

== Organization and demographics ==
The term Conservative Judaism was used, still generically and not yet as a specific label, already in the 1887 dedication speech of the Jewish Theological Seminary of America by Rabbi Alexander Kohut. By 1901, the JTS alumni formed the Rabbinical Assembly, of which all ordained Conservative clergy worldwide are members. As of 2010, there were 1648 rabbis in the RA. In 1913, the United Synagogue of America, renamed the United Synagogue of Conservative Judaism in 1991, was founded as a congregational arm of the RA. The movement established the World Council of Conservative Synagogues in 1957. Offshoots outside North America mostly adopted the Hebrew name "Masorti" ("traditional"), as did the Israeli Masorti Movement, founded in 1979, and the British Assembly of Masorti Synagogues, formed in 1985. The World Council eventually changed its primary designation to "Masorti Olami." Besides the RA, the international Cantors Assembly supplies prayer leaders for congregations worldwide.

The United Synagogue of Conservative Judaism, covering the United States, Canada and Mexico, is by far the largest constituent of Masorti Olami. While most congregations defining themselves as "Conservative" are affiliated with the USCJ, some are independent. While accurate information of Canada is scant, it is estimated that some third of religiously affiliated Canadian Jews are Conservative. In 2008, the more traditional Canadian Council of Conservative Synagogues seceded from the parent organization. It numbered seven communities as of 2014. According to the Pew Research Center survey in 2013, 18 per cent of Jews in the United States and in 2020 13 per cent identified with the movement, making it the second largest in the country. Steven M. Cohen calculated that as of 2013, 962,000 U.S. Jewish adults considered themselves Conservative: 570,000 were registered congregants and further 392,000 were not members in a synagogue but identified. In addition, Cohen assumed in 2006 that 57,000 unconverted non-Jewish spouses were also registered (12 per cent of member households had one at the time): 40 per cent of members intermarry. Conservatives are also the most aged group: among those aged under 30 only 11 per cent identified as such, and there are three people over 55 for every single one aged between 35 and 44. As of November 2015, the USCJ had 580 member congregations (a sharp decline from 630 two years prior), 19 in Canada and the remainder in the United States. In 2011 the USCJ initiated a plan to reinvigorate the movement.

Beyond North America, the movement has little presence—in 2011, Rela Mintz Geffen appraised there were only 100,000 members outside the U.S. (and the former figure including Canada). "Masorti AmLat", the MO branch in Latin America, is the largest with 35 communities in Argentina, seven in Brazil, six in Chile and further eleven in the other countries. The British Assembly of Masorti Synagogues has thirteen communities and estimates its membership at over 4000. More than twenty communities are spread across Europe, with three in Australia and two in Africa. The Masorti Movement in Israel incorporates about seventy communities and prayer groups with several thousand members. In addition, while Hungarian Neolog Judaism, with a few thousand adherents and forty partially active synagogues, is not officially affiliated with Masorti Olami, Conservative Judaism regards it as a fraternal, "non-Orthodox but halakhic" movement.

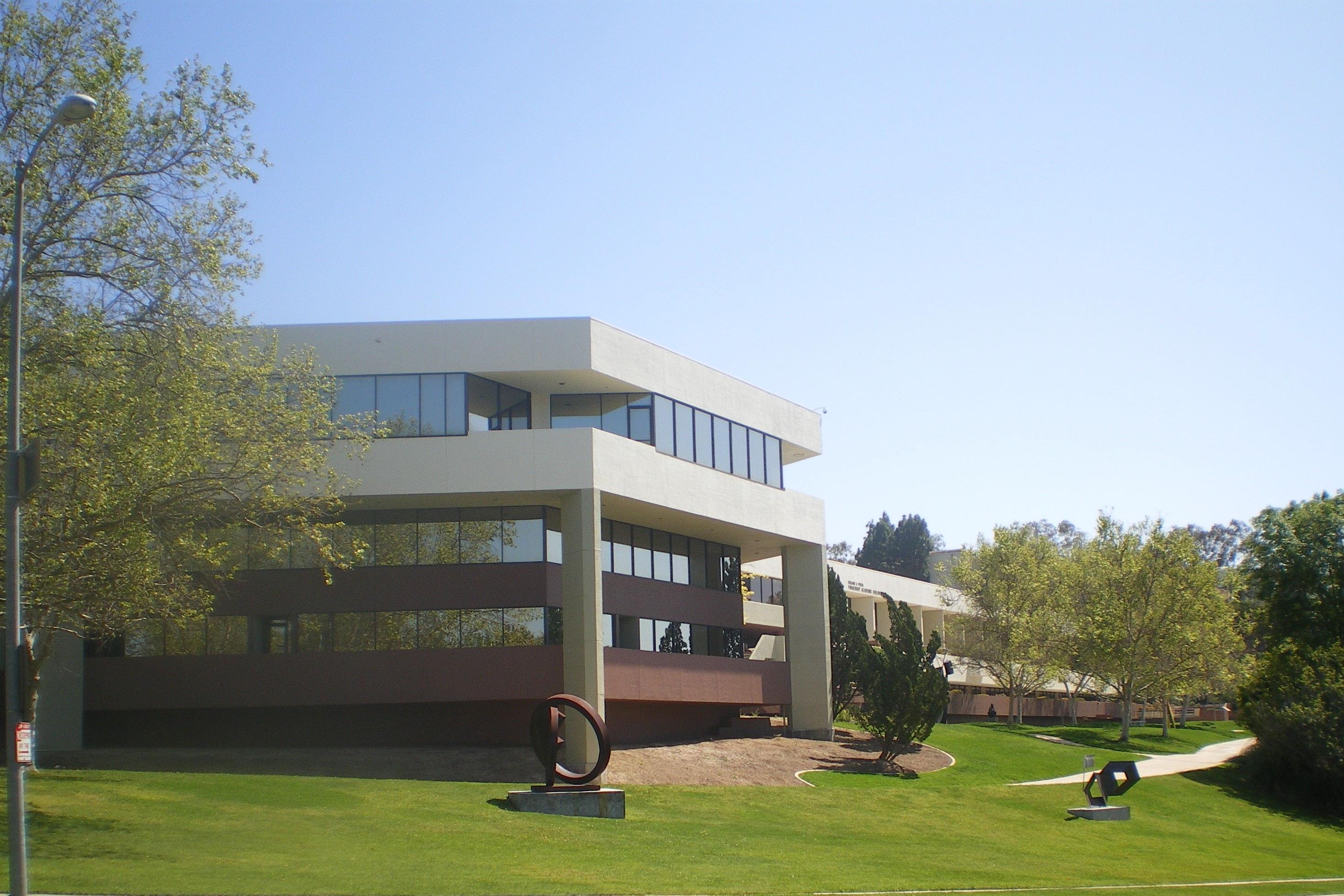
Ziegler School of Rabbinic Studies at American Jewish University

In New York, the JTS serves as the movement's original seminary and legacy institution, along with the Ziegler School of Rabbinic Studies at the American Jewish University in Los Angeles; Seminario Rabínico Latinoamericano in Buenos Aires, Argentina; and the Schechter Institute of Jewish Studies in Jerusalem. A Conservative institution that does not grant rabbinic ordination but which runs along the lines of a traditional yeshiva is the Conservative Yeshiva, located in Jerusalem. The Neolog Budapest University of Jewish Studies also maintains connections with Conservative Judaism.

The current chancellor of the JTS is Shuly Rubin Schwartz, in office since 2020. She is the first woman elected to this position in the history of JTS. The current dean of the Ziegler School of Rabbinic Studies is Bradley Shavit Artson. The Committee on Jewish Law and Standards is chaired by Rabbi Elliot N. Dorff, serving since 2007. The Rabbinical Assembly is headed by President Rabbi Debra Newman Kamin, as of 2019, and managed by chief executive officer, Rabbi Jacob Blumenthal. Rabbi Blumenthal holds the joint position as CEO of the United Synagogue of Conservative Judaism. The current USCJ President is Ned Gladstein. In South America, Rabbi Ariel Stofenmacher serves as chancellor in the Seminary and Rabbi Marcelo Rittner as president of Masorti AmLat. In Britain, the Masorti Assembly is chaired by Senior Rabbi Jonathan Wittenberg. The Masorti movement's executive director in Israel is Yizhar Hess and chair Sophie Fellman Rafalovitz.

The global youth movement is known as NOAM, an acronym for No'ar Masorti; its North American organization is called United Synagogue Youth. Marom Israel is the Masorti movement's organization for students and young adults, providing activities based on religious pluralism and Jewish content. The Women's League for Conservative Judaism is also active in North America.

The USCJ maintains the Schechter Day School Network, comprising 76 day schools in 17 American states and 2 Canadian provinces serving Jewish children. Many other "community day schools" that are not affiliated with Schechter take a generally Conservative approach, but unlike these, generally have "no barriers to enrollment based on the faith of the parents or on religious practices in the home". During the first decade of the 21st century, several schools that were part of the Schechter network transformed into non-affiliated community day schools. The USCJ also maintains the Camp Ramah system, where children and adolescents spend summers in an observant environment.

== History ==
=== Positive-Historical School ===
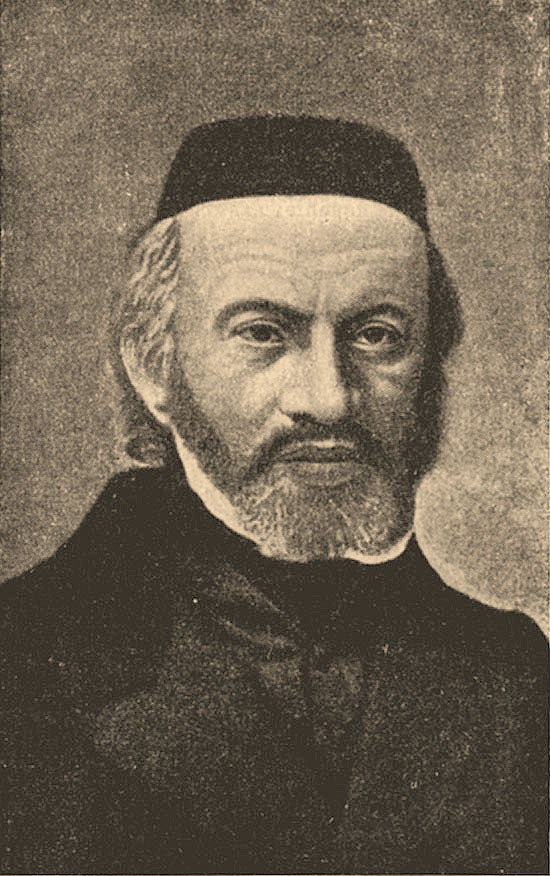
Rabbi Zecharias Frankel

The rise of modern, centralized European states by the early 19th century heralded the end of Jewish judicial autonomy and social seclusion. Their communal corporate rights were abolished, and the process of emancipation and acculturation that followed quickly transformed the values and norms of the public. Estrangement and apathy toward Judaism were rampant. The communal, educational and civil reform process could not be restricted from affecting the core tenets of the faith. The new academic, critical study of Judaism (Wissenschaft des Judentums) soon became a source of controversy. Rabbis and scholars argued to what degree, if at all, its findings could be used to determine present conduct. The modernized Orthodox in Germany, like rabbis Isaac Bernays and Azriel Hildesheimer, were content to cautiously study it while stringently adhering to the sanctity of holy texts and refusing to grant Wissenschaft any say in religious matters. On the other extreme were Rabbi Abraham Geiger, who would emerge as the founding father of Reform Judaism, and his supporters. They opposed any limit on critical research or its practical application, laying more weight on the need for change than continuity.

The Prague-born Zecharias Frankel, appointed chief rabbi of the Kingdom of Saxony in 1836, gradually rose to become the leader of those who stood in the middle. Besides working for the civic betterment of local Jews and educational reform, he displayed a keen interest in Wissenschaft. But Frankel was always cautious and deeply reverent towards tradition, privately writing in 1836, "The means must be applied with such care and discretion... that forward progress will be reached unnoticed, and seem inconsequential to the average spectator." He soon found himself embroiled in the disputes of the 1840s. In 1842, during the second Hamburg Temple dispute, he opposed the new Reform siddur. He argued that eliminating petitions for a future return to the Land of Israel in the Messianic Age violated an ancient tenet. However, he also opposed Bernays's ban on the tome, stating this was a primitive behaviour. In the same year, he and the moderate conservative Solomon Judah Loeb Rapoport were the only ones of nineteen respondents who negatively answered the Breslau community's enquiry on whether the deeply unorthodox Geiger could serve there.

In 1843, Frankel clashed with the radical Reform rabbi Samuel Holdheim, who argued that the act of marriage in Judaism was a civic (memonot) rather than sanctified (issurim) matter and could be subject to the Law of the Land. In December 1843 Frankel launched the magazine Zeitschrift für die Religiösen Interessen des Judenthums. In the preamble, he attempted to present his approach to the present plight: "The further development of Judaism cannot be done through Reform that would lead to total dissipation... But must be involved in its study... pursued via scientific research, on a positive, historical basis." The term Positive-Historical became associated with him and his middle way. The Zeitschrift was, along the convictions of its publisher, neither dogmatically orthodox nor overly polemic, wholly opposing Biblical criticism and arguing for the antiquity of custom and practice.

In 1844, Geiger and like-minded allies arranged a conference in Braunschweig that was to have enough authority (in 1826, Aaron Chorin called for the convocation of a new Sanhedrin) to debate and enact thoroughgoing revisions. Frankel was willing to agree only to a meeting without any practical results, and refused the invitation. When the protocols containing many radical statements were published, he denounced the assembly for "applying the scalpel of criticism" and favouring the spirit of the age over tradition. However, he later agreed to attend the second conference, held in Frankfurt am Main on 15 July 1845, despite warnings from Rapoport, who cautioned that compromising with Geiger was impossible. It would only damage his reputation among the traditionalists. On the 16th, the issue of Hebrew in the liturgy arose. Most present were inclined to retain it, but with more German segments. A slight majority adopted a resolution stating there were subjective, but no objective, imperatives to keep it as the language of service. Frankel then astounded his peers by vehemently protesting, saying it was a breach with the past and that Hebrew was of dire importance and great sentimental value. The others immediately began quoting all passages in rabbinic literature allowing prayer to be in the vernacular. Frankel could not contend with the halakhic validity of their decision, but he perceived it as a sign of profound differences between them. On the 17th, he formally withdrew, publishing a lambasting critique of the procedures. "Opponents of the conference, who feared he went to the other side," noted historian Michael A. Meyer, "now felt reassured of his loyalty".

Frankel's speech in the protocol of the Frankfurt conference, mentioning "Positive-Historical Judaism" (second row, 2–4 words from left)

The rabbi of Saxony had many sympathizers, who supported a similarly moderate approach and change only based on the authority of the Talmud. When Geiger began preparing a third conference in Breslau, Hirsch Bär Fassel convinced Frankel to organize one of his own in protest. Frankel invited colleagues to an assembly in Dresden, which was to be held on 21 October 1846. He announced that one measure he was willing to countenance was the possible abolition of the second day of festivals, though only if a broad consensus would be reached and not before thorough deliberation. Attendants were to include Rapoport, Fassel, Adolf Jellinek, Leopold Löw, Michael Sachs, Abraham Kohn and others. However, the Dresden assembly soon drew heated Orthodox resistance, especially from Rabbi Jacob Ettlinger, and was postponed indefinitely.

In 1854, Frankel was appointed chancellor in the new Jewish Theological Seminary of Breslau, Germany's first modern rabbinical seminary. His opponents on both flanks were incensed. Geiger and the Reform camp accused him of theological ambiguity, hypocrisy, and attachment to stagnant remnants. They now protested the "medieval" atmosphere in the seminary, which was mainly concerned with teaching Jewish Law. The hardline Samson Raphael Hirsch, who fiercely opposed Wissenschaft des Judentums and emphasized the divine origin of the entire halakhic system in the theophany at Biblical Mount Sinai, was deeply suspicious of Frankel's beliefs, use of science and constant assertions that Jewish Law was flexible and evolving.

The final schism between Frankel and the Orthodox occurred after the 1859 publication of his Darke ha-Mishna "Ways of the Mishna". He praised the Chazal, presenting them as bold innovators, but did not affirm the divinity of the Oral Torah. On the ordinances classified as Law given to Moses at Sinai, he quoted Asher ben Jehiel that stated several of those were only apocryphally dubbed as such. He applied the latter's conclusion to all, noting they were "so evident as if given at Sinai". Hirsch branded Frankel a heretic, demanding that he announce whether he believed that both the Oral and Written Torah were of celestial origin. Rabbis Benjamin Hirsch Auerbach, Solomon Klein and others published more complaisant tracts, but also requested an explanation. Rapoport marshaled to Frankel's aid, assuring that his words merely reiterated ben Jehiel's and that he would soon release a statement that would belie Hirsch's accusations. However, the Chancellor of Breslau issued an ambiguous defence, writing that his book was not concerned with theology and avoiding giving any clear answer. Rapoport now joined his critics.

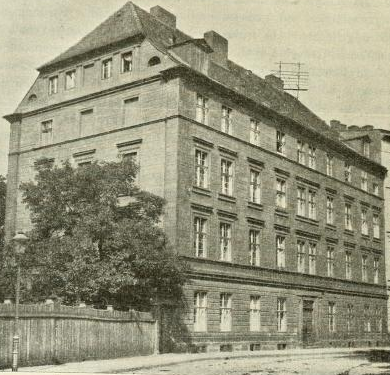
Jewish Theological Seminary of Breslau

Hirsch succeeded, severely tarnishing Frankel's reputation among most concerned. Hirsch and fellow Orthodox Rabbi Azriel Hildesheimer launched a protracted public campaign through the 1860s. They ceaselessly stressed the chasm between an Orthodox understanding of Halakha as derived and revealed, applied differently to different circumstances and subject to human judgement and possibly error, yet unchanging and divine in principle—as opposed to an evolutionary, historicist and non-dogmatic approach in which past authorities were not just elaborating but consciously innovating, as taught by Frankel. Hildesheimer often repeated that this issue utterly overshadowed any specific technical argument with the Breslau School (the students of which were usually more lenient on matters of headcovering for women, Chalav Yisrael and other issues). Hildesheimer was concerned that Jewish public opinion perceived no practical difference between them. However, he cared to distinguish the observant acolytes of Frankel from the Reform camp, he noted in his diary: "How meager is the principal difference between the Breslau School, who don silk gloves at their work, and Geiger who wields a sledgehammer." In 1863, when Breslau faculty member Heinrich Graetz published an article where he appeared to doubt the Messianic belief, Hildesheimer immediately seized upon the occasion to prove once more the dogmatic, rather than practical, divide. He denounced Graetz as a heretic.

The Positive-Historical School was influential, but never institutionalized itself as thoroughly as its opponents. Apart from the many graduates of Breslau, Isaac Noah Mannheimer, Adolf Jellinek and Rabbi Moritz Güdemann led the central congregation in Vienna along a similar path. In Jellinek's local seminary, Meir Friedmann and Isaac Hirsch Weiss followed Frankel's moderate approach to critical research. The rabbinate of the liberal Neolog public in Hungary, which formally separated from the Orthodox, was also permeated with the "Breslau spirit". Many of its members studied there, and its Jewish Theological Seminary of Budapest was modeled after it, though the assimilationist congregants cared little for rabbinic opinion. In Germany itself, Breslau alumni founded in 1868 a short-lived society, the Jüdisch-Theologische Verein. It was dissolved within a year, boycotted by both Reform and Orthodox. Michael Sachs led the Berlin congregation in a very conservative style, eventually resigning when an organ was introduced in services. Manuel Joël, another of the Frankelist party, succeeded Geiger in Breslau. He maintained his predecessor's truncated German translation of the liturgy for the sake of compromise, but restored the complete Hebrew text.

The Breslau Seminary and the Reform Hochschule für die Wissenschaft des Judentums maintained very different approaches. Still, on the communal level, the former's alumni failure to organize or articulate a coherent agenda, coupled with the declining prestige of Breslau and the conservatism of the Hochschule's alumni—a necessity in heterogeneous communities which remained unified, especially after the Orthodox gained the right to secede in 1876—imposed a relatively uniform and mild character on what was known in Germany as "Liberal Judaism". In 1909, 63 rabbis associated with the Breslau approach founded the Freie Jüdische Vereinigung, another brief attempt at institutionalization that failed soon. Only in 1925 did the Religiöse Mittelpartei für Frieden und Einheit succeed in driving the same agenda. It won several seats in communal elections, but was small and of little influence.

=== Jewish Theological Seminary ===
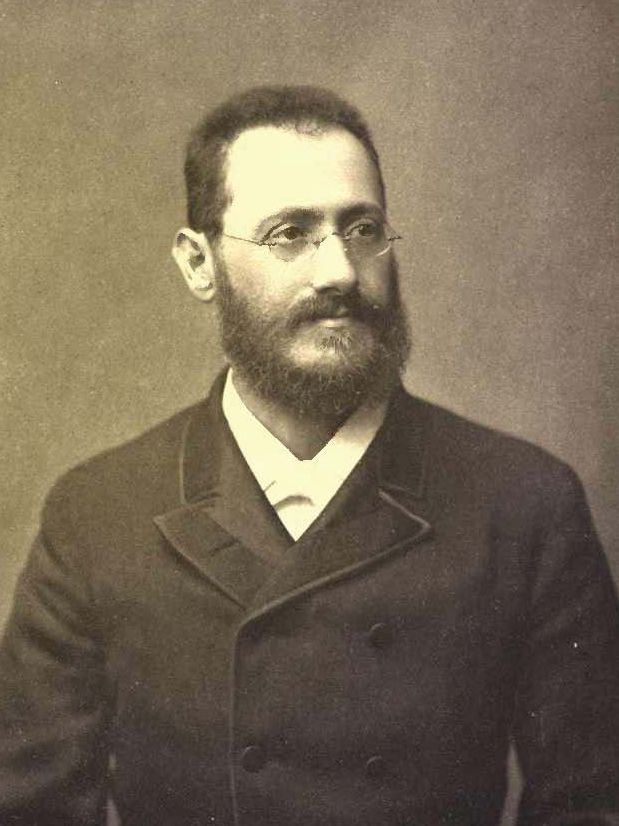
Alexander Kohut

Jewish immigration to the United States bred an amalgam of loose communities, lacking strong tradition or stable structures. In this free-spirited environment, a multitude of forces was at work. As early as 1866, Rabbi Jonas Bondi of New York wrote that a Judaism of the "golden middleway, which was termed Orthodox by the left and heterodox or reformer by the right" developed in the new country. The rapid ascendancy of Reform Judaism by the 1880s left few who opposed it, merely a handful of congregations and ministers remained outside the Union of American Hebrew Congregations. These included Sabato Morais and Rabbi Henry Pereira Mendes of the elitist Sephardi congregations, along with rabbis Bernard Drachman (ordained at Breslau, though he regarded himself as Orthodox) and Henry Schneeberger.

While spearheaded by radical and principled Reformers like Rabbi Kaufmann Kohler, the UAHC was also home to more conservative elements. President Isaac Meyer Wise, a pragmatist intent on compromise, hoped to forge a broad consensus that would turn a moderate version of Reform to dominant in America. He kept the dietary laws at home and attempted to assuage traditionalists. On 11 July 1883, apparently due to negligence by the Jewish caterer, non-kosher dishes were served to UAHC rabbis in Wise's presence. Known to posterity as the "trefa banquet", it purportedly made some guests abandon the hall in disgust, but little is factually known about the incident. In 1885, the traditionalist forces were bolstered upon the arrival of Rabbi Alexander Kohut, an adherent of Frankel. He publicly excoriated Reform for disdaining ritual and received forms, triggering a heated polemic with Kohler. The debate was one of the main factors which motivated the latter to compose the Pittsburgh Platform, which unambiguously declared the principles of Reform Judaism: "to-day we accept as binding only the moral laws, and maintain only such ceremonies as elevate and sanctify our lives."

The explicit wording alienated a handful of conservative UAHC ministers: Henry Hochheimer, Frederick de Sola Mendes, Aaron Wise, Marcus Jastrow, and Benjamin Szold. They joined Kohut, Morais and the others in seeking to establish a traditional rabbinic seminary that would serve as a counterweight to Hebrew Union College. In 1886, they founded the Jewish Theological Seminary of America in New York City. Kohut, professor of Talmud who held to the Positive-Historical ideal, was the main educational influence in the early years, prominent among the founders who encompassed the entire spectrum from progressive Orthodox to the brink of Reform; to describe what the seminary intended to espouse, he used the term "Conservative Judaism", which had no independent meaning at the time and was only in relation to Reform. In 1898, Pereira Mendes, Schneeberger and Drachman also founded the Orthodox Union, which maintained close ties with the seminary.

The JTS was a small, fledgling institution with financial difficulties, and was ordaining merely a rabbi per year. But soon after Chancellor Morais' death in 1897, its fortunes turned. Since 1881, a wave of Jewish immigration from Eastern Europe was inundating the country—by 1920, 2.5 million of them had arrived, increasing American Jewry tenfold. They came from regions where civil equality or emancipation were never granted, while acculturation and modernization made little headway. Whether devout or irreligious, they mostly retained strong traditional sentiments in matters of faith, accustomed to old-style rabbinate; the hardline Agudas HaRabbanim, founded by emigrant clergy, opposed secular education or vernacular sermons, and its members spoke almost only Yiddish. The Eastern Europeans were alienated by the local Jews, who were all assimilated in comparison, and especially aghast by the mores of Reform. The need to find a religious framework that would both accommodate and Americanize them motivated Jacob Schiff and other rich philanthropists, all Reform and of German descent, to donate $500,000 to the JTS. The contribution was solicited by Professor Cyrus Adler. It was conditioned on the appointment of Solomon Schechter as Chancellor. In 1901, the Rabbinical Assembly was established as the fraternity of JTS alumni.

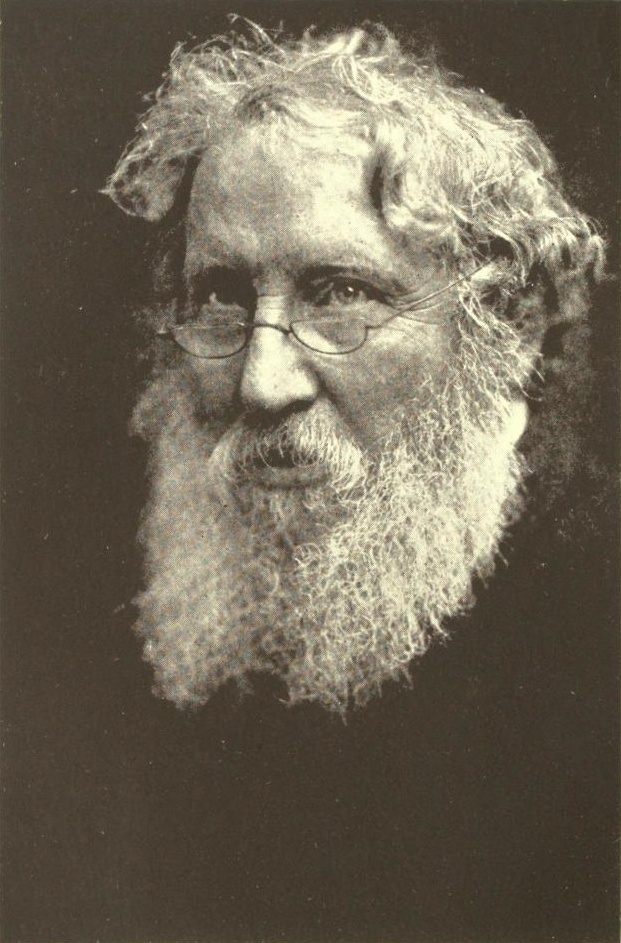
Solomon Schechter

Schechter arrived in 1902, and at once reorganized the faculty, dismissing both Pereira Mendes and Drachman for lack of academic merit. Under his aegis, the institute began to draw famous scholars, becoming a center of learning on par with HUC. Schechter was both traditional in sentiment and quite unorthodox in conviction. He maintained that theology was of little importance and it was practice that must be preserved. He aspired to solicit unity in American Judaism, denouncing sectarianism and not perceiving himself as leading a new denomination: "not to create a new party, but to consolidate an old one". The need to raise funds convinced him that a congregational arm for the Rabbinical Assembly and the JTS was required. On 23 February 1913, he founded the United Synagogue of America (since 1991: United Synagogue of Conservative Judaism), which then consisted of 22 communities. He and Mendes first came to major disagreement; Schechter insisted that any alumnus could be appointed to the USoA's managerial board, and not just to serve as communal rabbi, including several the latter did not consider sufficiently devout, or who tolerated mixed seating in their synagogues (though some of those he still regarded as Orthodox). Mendes, president of the Orthodox Union, therefore refused to join. He began to distinguish between the "Modern Orthodoxy" of himself and his peers in the OU, and "Conservatives" who tolerated what was beyond the pale for him. However, this first sign of institutionalization and separation was far from conclusive. Mendes himself could not clearly differentiate between the two groups, and many he viewed as Orthodox were members of the USoA. The epithets "Conservative" and "Orthodox" remained interchangeable for decades to come. JTS graduates served in OU congregations; many students of the Orthodox Rabbi Isaac Elchanan Theological Seminary and members of the OU's Rabbinical Council of America, or RCA, attended it. In 1926, RIETS and the JTS even negotiated a possible merger, though it was never materialized. Upon Schechter's death in 1915, the first generation of his disciples kept his non-sectarian legacy of striving for a united, traditional American Judaism. He was replaced by Cyrus Adler.

The USoA grew rapidly as the Eastern European immigrant population slowly integrated. In 1923 it already had 150 affiliated communities, and 229 before 1930. Synagogues offered a more modernized ritual: English sermons, choir singing, late Friday evening services which tacitly acknowledging that most had to work until after the Sabbath began, and often mixed-gender seating. Men and women sat separately with no partition, and some houses of prayer already introduced family pews. Motivated by popular pressure and frowned upon by both RA and seminary faculty—in its own synagogue, the institute maintained a partition until 1983—this was becoming common among the OU as well. As both social conditions and apathy turned American Jews away from tradition (barely 20 per cent were attending prayers weekly), a young professor named Mordecai Kaplan promoted the idea of transforming the synagogue into a community center, a "Shul with a Pool", a policy which indeed stymied the tide somewhat.

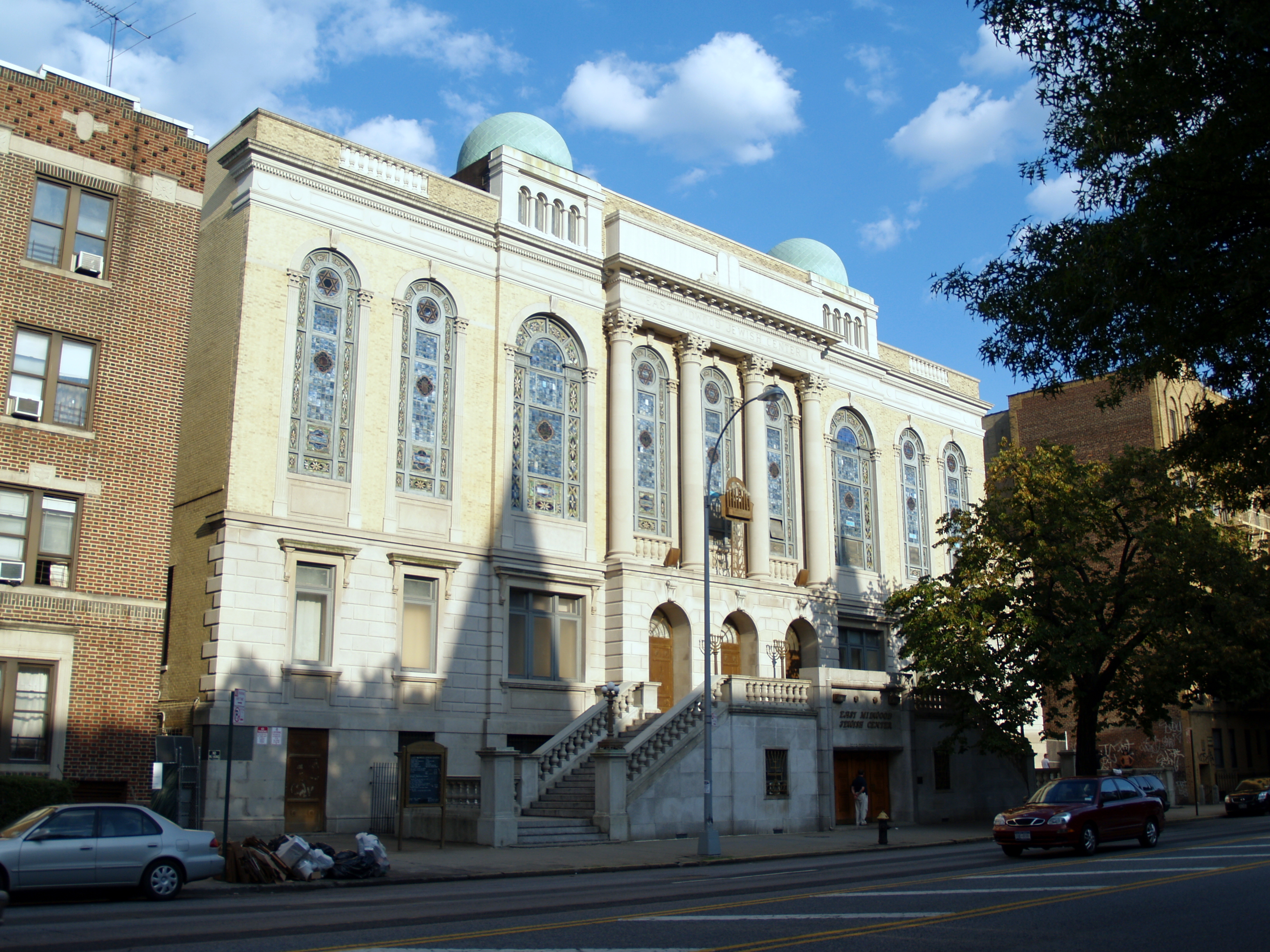
East Midwood Jewish Center, a United Synagogue affiliate built in 1926, during the early years of the union

In 1927, the RA also established its own Committee of Jewish Law, entrusted with determining halakhic issues. Consisting of seven members, it was chaired by the traditionalist Rabbi Louis Ginzberg, who already distinguished himself in 1922, drafting a responsa that allowed the use of grape juice rather than fermented wine for Kiddush on the background of Prohibition. Kaplan himself, who rose to become an influential and popular figure within the JTS, concluded that his fellow rabbis' ambiguity in matters of belief and the contradiction between full observance and critical study were untenable and hypocritical. He formulated his own approach of Judaism as a Civilization, rejecting the concept of Revelation and any supernatural belief in favour of a cultural-ethnic perception. While valuing received mores, he eventually suggested giving the past "a vote, not a veto". Though popular among students, Kaplan's nascent Reconstructionism was opposed by the new traditionalist Chancellor Louis Finkelstein, appointed in 1940, and a large majority among the faculty.

Tensions within the JTS and RA grew. The Committee of Jewish Law consisted mainly of scholars who had little field experience, almost solely from the seminary's Talmudic department. They were greatly concerned with halakhic licitness and indifferent to the pressures exerted on the pulpit rabbis, who had to contend with an Americanized public which cared little for such considerations or for tradition in general. In 1935, the RA almost adopted a groundbreaking motion: Rabbi Louis Epstein offered a solution to the agunah predicament, a clause that would have had husbands appoint wives as their proxies to issue divorce. It was repealed under pressure from the Orthodox Union. As late as 1947, CJL Chair Rabbi Boaz Cohen, himself a historicist who argued that the Law evolved much through time, rebuked pulpit clergy who requested lenient or radical rulings, stating he and his peers were content to "progress in inches... Free setting up of new premises and the introduction of novel categories of ritual upon the basis of pure reason and thinking would be perilous, if not fatal, to the principles and continuity of Jewish Law."

=== A third movement ===
The boundaries between Orthodox and Conservative Judaism in America were institutionalized only in the aftermath of World War II. The 1940s saw the younger generation of JTS graduates less patient with the prudence of the CJL and Talmud faculty in face of popular demand. Kaplan's Reconstructionism, while its fully committed partisans were few, had much influence. The majority among recent alumni eschewed the epithet "Orthodox" and tended to employ "Conservative" exclusively. Succeeding Schechter's direct disciples who headed the RA, JTS and United Synagogue in the interwar period, a new strata of activist leaders was rising. Rabbi Robert Gordis, RA president in 1944–1946, represented the junior members in advocating more flexibility; Rabbi Jacob Agus, a RIETS graduate who joined the body only in 1945, clamored that "we need a law making body, not a law interpreting committee." Agus argued that the breach between the Jewish public and tradition was too wide to be bridged conventionally, and that the RA would always remain inferior to the Orthodox as long as it retained its policy of merely adopting lenient precedents in rabbinic literature. He offered to extensively apply the tool of takkanah, rabbinic ordinance.

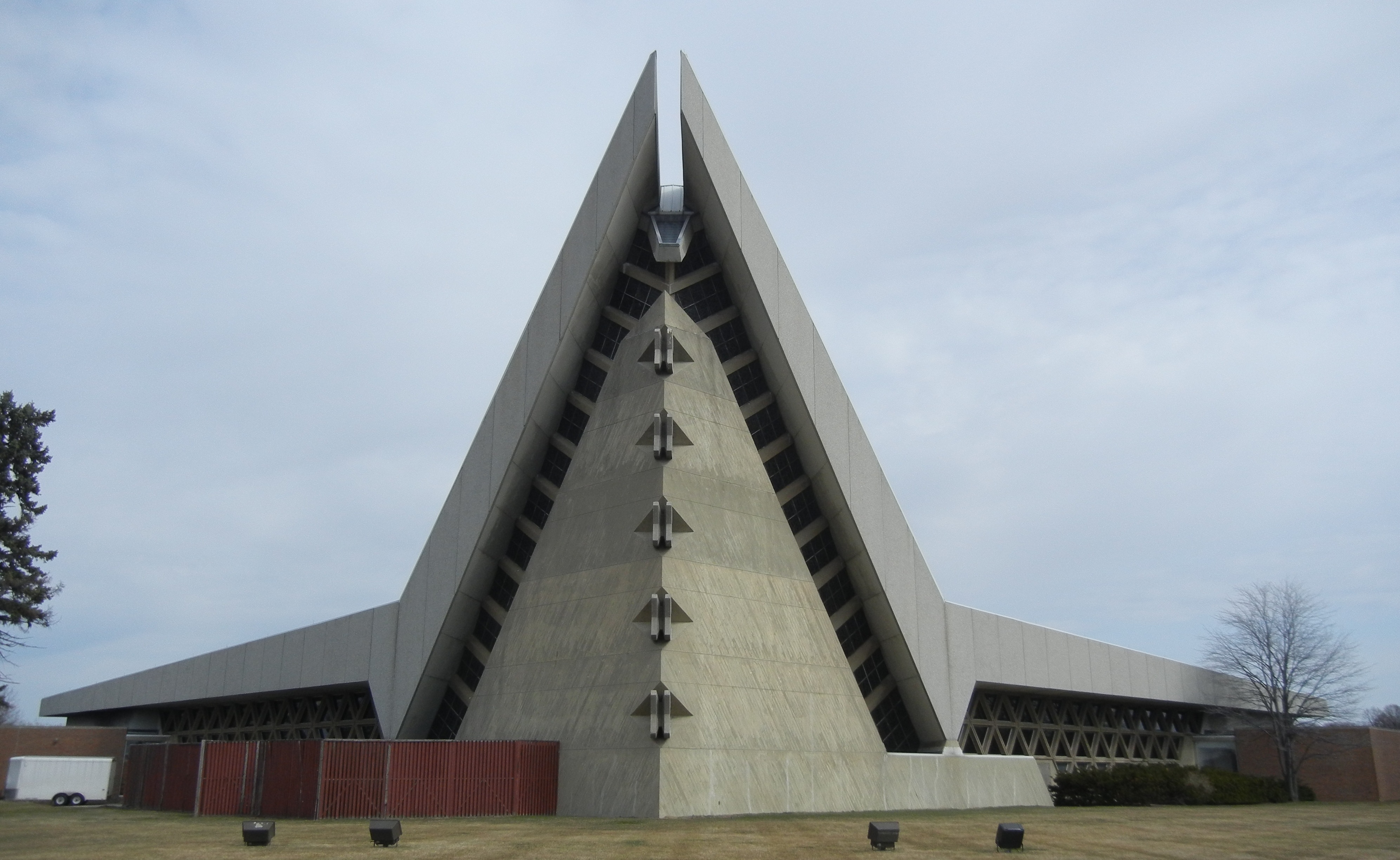
The Conservative Congregation Shaarey Zedek, Southfield, Michigan. The synagogue was built in 1962, after the migration to suburbia

In 1946, a committee chaired by Gordis issued the Sabbath and Festival Prayerbook, the first clearly Conservative liturgy: references to the sacrificial cult were in the past tense instead of a petition for restoration, and it rephrased blessings such as "who hast made me according to thy will" for women to "who hast made me a woman". During the movement's national conference in Chicago, held 13–17 May 1948, the pulpit rabbis in the RA gained the upper hand. Spurred by Gordis, Agus and fellow leaders, they voted to reorganize the CJL into a Committee of Jewish Law and Standards, enfranchised to issue takkanot by a majority. Membership was conditioned on having experience as a congregational rabbi, and unseasoned JTS faculty were thus denied entrance. While the RA was asserting a Conservative distinctive identity, the seminary remained more cautious. Finkelstein opposed sectarianism and preferred the neutral epithet "traditional", later commenting that "Conservative Judaism is a gimmick to get Jews back to real Judaism". He and the very right-wing Talmud professor Saul Lieberman, who maintained ties with the Orthodox while also viewing them as obstructionist and ossified, dominated the JTS, providing a counterweight to the liberals in the Assembly. Kaplan, meanwhile, spent more time on consolidating his Society for Advancement of Judaism. Abraham Joshua Heschel, who espoused a mysticist understanding of Jewish religion, also became an important figure among the faculty.

The CJLS now proceeded to demonstrate its independence. Sabbath was widely desecrated by a large majority of Jews, and the board believed attendance at synagogues should be encouraged. They therefore enacted an ordinance that allowed driving on the Sabbath (for worship alone) and the use of electricity. The driving responsum was later severely criticized by Conservative rabbis, and was charged with imparting that the movement was overly keen to condone the laxity of congregants. It also signified the final break with the Orthodox, who were themselves being bolstered by more strictly observant immigrants from Europe. In 1954, the RCA reversed its 1948 ruling that allowed the use of microphones on Sabbath and festivals and declared that praying without a partition between sexes was banned. Though enforced slowly—in 1997, there were still seven OU congregations with no physical barrier, and so-called "Conservadox" remain extant—these two attributes became a demarcation line between Orthodox and Conservative synagogues. RA converts were denied ablution in Orthodox ritual baths, and rabbis from one movement would gradually cease serving in the other's communities.

Rather than a force within American Judaism, the JTS-centered movement emerged as a third movement. The historicist and critical approach to halakha, as well as other features, were emphasized by leaders eager to demonstrate their uniqueness. In their efforts to solidify a coherent identity, Conservative thinkers like Mordecai Waxman in his 1957 Tradition and Change, ventured beyond Schechter's conceptions to Rabbi Zecharias Frankel and Breslau, presenting themselves as its direct inheritors via Alexander Kohut and others. The CJLS continued to issue groundbreaking ordinances and rulings.

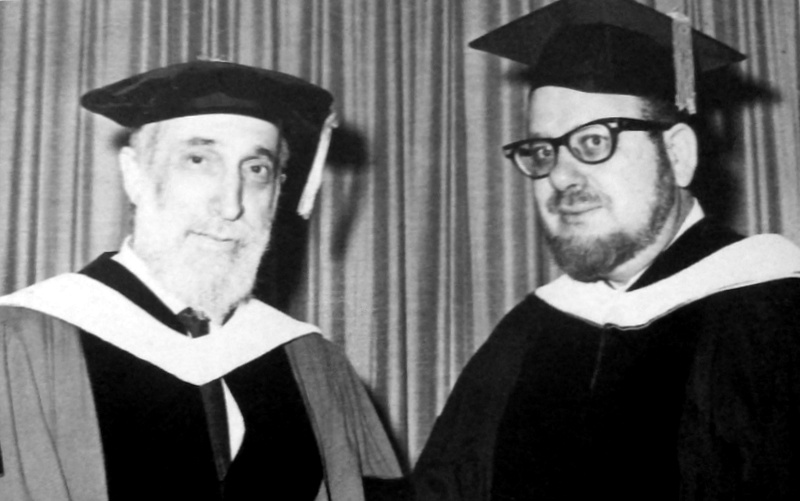
Chancellor Louis Finkelstein (left), the dominant leader of JTS from 1940 to 1972.

The postwar decades were a time of immense growth for the Conservative movement. Most of the 500,000 decommissioned Jewish GIs left the densely populated immigrant neighbourhoods of the East Coast, moving to suburbia. They were Americanized but still retained traditional sentiments, and Reform Judaism was too radical for most. The United Synagogue of America offered Jewish education for children and a familiar religious environment which was also comfortable and not strict. It expanded from 350 communities by 1945 to 832 by 1971, becoming the largest denomination, with some 350,000 dues-paying member households (1.5 million people) at synagogues and over 40 per cent of American Jewry identifying with it in polls, adding an estimated million more non-registered supporters.

Already in a 1955 study, Marshall Sklare defined Conservative Judaism as the quintessential American Jewish movement, but stressed the gap between laity and clergy, noting "rabbis now recognize that they are not making decisions or writing responsa, but merely taking a poll of their membership." Most congregants, commented Edward S. Shapiro, were "Conservative Jews because their rabbi kept kosher and the Sabbath... Not because of their religious behavior." The movement established its presence outside the U.S. and Canada: In 1962, the young Rabbi Marshall Meyer founded the Seminario Rabinico Latinoamericano in Buenos Aires, which would serve as the basis for Conservative expansion in South America. In 1979, four communities formed the Israel Masorti Movement. Rabbi Louis Jacobs, dismissed in 1964 from the British Orthodox rabbinate on the charge of heresy after espousing a non-literal understanding of the Torah, joined with the Conservatives and founded his country's first Masorti community. The new branches were all united within the World Council of Synagogues, later to be named Masorti Olami.

The movement peaked in numbers in the 1970s. During that decade, the tensions between the various elements within it intensified. The right wing, conservative in halakhic matters and often adhering to a verbal understanding of revelation, was dismayed by the failure to bolster observance among the laity and the resurgence of Orthodoxy. The left was influenced by the Reconstructionists, who formed their own seminary in 1968 and were slowly coalescing, as well as the growing appeal of Reform, which turned more traditional and threatened to sway congregants. While the rightists opposed further modifications, their left-wing peers demanded them. The Chavurah movement, consisting of nonaligned prayer quorums of young (and frequently, Conservative-raised) worshipers who sought a more intense religious experience, also weakened congregations. In 1972, the liberal wing gained an influential position with the appointment of Gerson D. Cohen as JTS Chancellor. During the same year, after Reform began to ordain female rabbis, a strong lobby rose to advocate the same. The CJLS rapidly enacted an ordinance which allowed women to be tallied for a minyan, and by 1976 the percentage of synagogues allowing them to bless during the reading of the Torah grew from 7 per cent to 50 per cent. In 1979, ignoring the denominational leadership, Beth Israel Congregation of Chester County accepted the RRC-ordained Rabbi Linda Joy Holtzman. Pressures to allow women to assume rabbinical positions was mounting from the congregational level, though the RA agreed to delay any action until the JTS scholars would concur.

Female ordination was a matter of great friction until 1983, when Rabbi Joel Roth devised a solution that entailed women voluntarily accepting the obligation to pray regularly. The leadership passed it not by scholarly consensus but via a popular vote of all JTS faculty, including non-specialists. Two years later, the first JTS-ordained female rabbi, Amy Eilberg, was admitted into the RA. David Weiss Halivni, professor of the Talmud faculty, claimed that Roth's method must have required waiting until a considerable number of women did prove sufficient commitment. He and his sympathizers regarded the vote as belying any claim to halakhic integrity. They formed the Union for Traditional Conservative Judaism in 1985, a right-wing lobby which numbered some 10,000 supporters from the Conservative observant elite. The UTJC withdrew from the movement and erased the word "Conservative" in 1990, attempting to merge with moderate Orthodox organizations.

In the very same year, the Reconstructionist also seceded fully, joining the World Union for Progressive Judaism under observer status. The double defection narrowed the movement's spectrum of opinions, at a time when large swaths of congregants were abandoning in favour of Reform, which was more tolerant of intermarriage. RA leaders were engaged in introspection through the later 1980s, resulting in the 1988 Emet ve-Emunah platform, while Reform slowly bypassed them and became the largest American Jewish movement.

After the issue of egalitarianism for women subsided, LGBT acceptance replaced it as the main source of contention between the declining right wing and the liberal majority. A first attempt was rebuffed in 1992 by a harsh responsum written by Roth. The retirement of Chancellor Ismar Schorsch, a staunch opponent, allowed the CJLS to endorse a motion which still banned anal intercourse but not any other physical contact, and allowed the ordination of openly LGBT rabbis, in 2006. Roth and three other supporters resigned from the panel in protest, claiming the responsum was not valid; Masorti affiliates in South America, Israel and Hungary objected severely. The Seminario is yet to accept the resolution, while several Canadian congregations seceded from the United Synagogue in 2008 to form an independent union in protest of the slide to the left. Since the 2013 Pew survey, which assessed that only 18 per cent of American Jews identify with it, Conservative leadership is engaged in attempting to solve Conservative Judaism's demographic crisis.
