= Alexander Burnstein =

Alexander J. Burnstein
- Born: May 7, 1899; Bila Tserkov, Kyiv Gubernia Russian Empire (now Ukraine)
- Died: October 17, 1980 (aged 79–80); Manhattan, New York
- Occupation: Interfaith leader

Alexander J. Burnstein (May 7, 1899 – October 17, 1980), a rabbinic ordinand of the Jewish Theological Seminary of America, was a writer, editor and interfaith leader. Burnstein was born in [Bila Tserkov] and, after making his way to the United States, graduated from Northwestern University.

== Biography ==
At a ceremony where Hayim Nahman Bialik received an honorary Doctorate of Hebrew Letters by the Seminary, Burnstein was ordained in June 1926—in the same class as Rabbis Joel S. Geffen, Israel M. Goldman, Elhanan H. Golomb, Jacob Granowitz, Louis Greenberg, Lewis B. Grossman, Moses Hadas, Michael Higger, Jonas Kaminkowski, Herbert Parzen and Benjamin Unger. In addition to his rabbinic ordination, Burnstein also held a master's degree from Columbia University and earned a Doctorate of Divinity from the Seminary in 1965.

In 1928, Burnstein began what was, according to The New York Times, a ten-year term serving Temple Beth El of Harrisburg, Pennsylvania. A young rabbi, only three years after ordination, at the Rabbinical Assembly conference of 1929, Burnstein lectured on "The Abiding Values of the Resurrection Belief." Only two years into his tenure at Temple Beth El, Burnstein witnessed and offered some words upon the congregation's dedication of its new building in 1930 at a ceremony attended both by Harrisburg's mayor George A. Hoverter and Philadelphia's Rabbi Max D. Klein. Pamela Susan Nadell and Marc Lee Raphael write, however, that Rabbi Max "Gelb succeeded ... Burnstein as rabbi of Temple Beth El, Harrisburg, Pennsylvania (1933–39)" and "found the congregation beset by serious financial problems, brought on by the Depression ... [a] declining membership and the failure of most of the congregation's auxiliaries." The exact dating of Burnstein's tenure in Harrisburg is complicated by the official records of Tifereth Israel Congregation in New Bedford, MA, which note that "Rabbi Alexander Burnstein was elected to replace Rabbi [Nochman S.] Arnoff on January 30, 1927, but only stayed with this congregation for 2 years before returning to New York." During this time it is recorded that "Cantor Boris Alper came to the congregation in 1928, and formed the first mixed choir" before Alper "passed away in 1947." Ultimately, "Rabbi Bernard H. Ziskind was elected to replace Rabbi Burnstein." (One separate record recalls Ziskind as having begun his career in New Bedford in 1930.) Notably, the Report of the Forty-Second Year of the Jewish Publication Society of America 1929-1930 indicates that there was in this time period a Rabbi A. Burnstein at Beth El in Harrisburg, PA.

On December 1, 1938, upon the successful arrangement of this position by Cyrus Adler (who had presided over Burnstein's ordination less than a decade before), became the executive secretary of the Advisory Committee on Refugee Jewish Ministers from 1938 to 1942. Burnstein, who, in this capacity, worked with representatives of the three major denominations of American Judaism at the time, regarded Adler as having "done more toward the consummation of this project than any other man." In this capacity, Burnstein was tasked with handling all of the requests that Adler had forwarded from cantors and rabbis asking the Seminary to bring them to the United States from Europe. On May 1, 1939, Burnstein informed Adler that he had successfully relocated 33 rabbis to the United States, including Rabbi Emil Schorsch of Hanover, the father of JTS' former Chancellor Rabbi Dr. Ismar Schorsch. As Adler's health waned, Louis Finkelstein took Adler's stead, and Burnstein became a regular correspondent with Finkestein, asking the latter to urge congregations to hire refugee rabbis he recommended. Burnstein's employment in this position ceased in 1942. It is known that, during the Holocaust, Burnstein corresponded with Joseph H. Hertz, the Chief Rabbi of England.

Prior to 1942, when Burnstein began to serve the Orthodox congregation Millinery Center Synagogue in Manhattan (the city in which he died ten years after his retirement in 1970), Burnstein had previously led congregations in—aside from Harrisburg--New Bedford, Massachusetts; Newark, New Jersey and Long Beach, New York. In 1945—while serving Millinery Center Synagogue—Burnstein joined the editorial board of the quarterly Conservative Judaism, a journal to which he would later contribute his own writings and remained on the editorial board through 1951. Between 1949 and 1950, Burnstein served as a member of the Rabbinical Assembly's Committee on Jewish Law (since renamed the Committee on Jewish Law and Standards).

An activist, Burnstein was a signatory to "A proclamation on the moral rights of the stateless and Palestinian Jews," published in 1941 calling for support for the Jewish plight in Palestine. In that same year, Burnstein spoke at the East Midwood Jewish Center, where Rev. Dr. Harry Halpern served as the rabbi; the former, in the capacity of "guest preacher" was scheduled to deliver on December 12, 1941 "A Message to the Defeated." Although the content of the speech appears not to be recorded, it is notable that this talk was delivered the first Friday night (Shabbat evening) after the Attack on Pearl Harbor. Burnstein is also the author of a widely disseminated piece (having appeared in Milwaukee's The Wisconsin Jewish Chronicle and The Jewish Floridian) on finding meaning in the idea of freedom when celebrating Passover in an age dominated by technological advance and globalization.

Burnstein evidently believed that the Decalogue was an important ecumenical guideline for people of all faiths and non-faiths to follow. The New York Times reported the day after an April 30 multifaith gathering at which Burnstein spoke:

Nations are called upon to obey the ten commandments as well as individuals, Rabbi Alexander J. Burnstein, chaplain of the Employes [sic] Welfare Association of the city's Department of Marine and Aviation, said at an interfaith communion breakfast yesterday morning ... "The message of Mount Sinai was directed at nations and groups as well as individuals," said Rabbi Burnstein. He cited the "Code of Holiness" in Leviticus XIX as applying the ten commandments to collective behavior.

— "Ten Commandments Urged For Nations", The New York Times (May 1, 1950)

Burnstein was one of two Jews, both rabbis (the other being Rabbi Abraham Joshua Heschel), who contributed to a volume celebrating the lifework of Reinhold Niebuhr. Burnstein, a Jewish "admirer" of Niebuhr, wrote of his disagreement with Niebuhr in focusing on teshuvah rather than original sin in understanding human behavior.
