= Congregation Shomrei Emunah =

Congregation Shomrei Emunah is the name of Jewish congregations and synagogues and could refer to:

In the United States

- Congregation Shomrei Emunah (Baltimore), in Baltimore, Maryland
- Congregation Shomrei Emunah (Borough Park), in Brooklyn, New York
