= Congregation Beth Jacob Ohev Sholom =

Orthodox synagogue in New York

Beth Jacob Ohev Sholom
- Hebrew: בית כנסת בית יעקב אוהב שלום
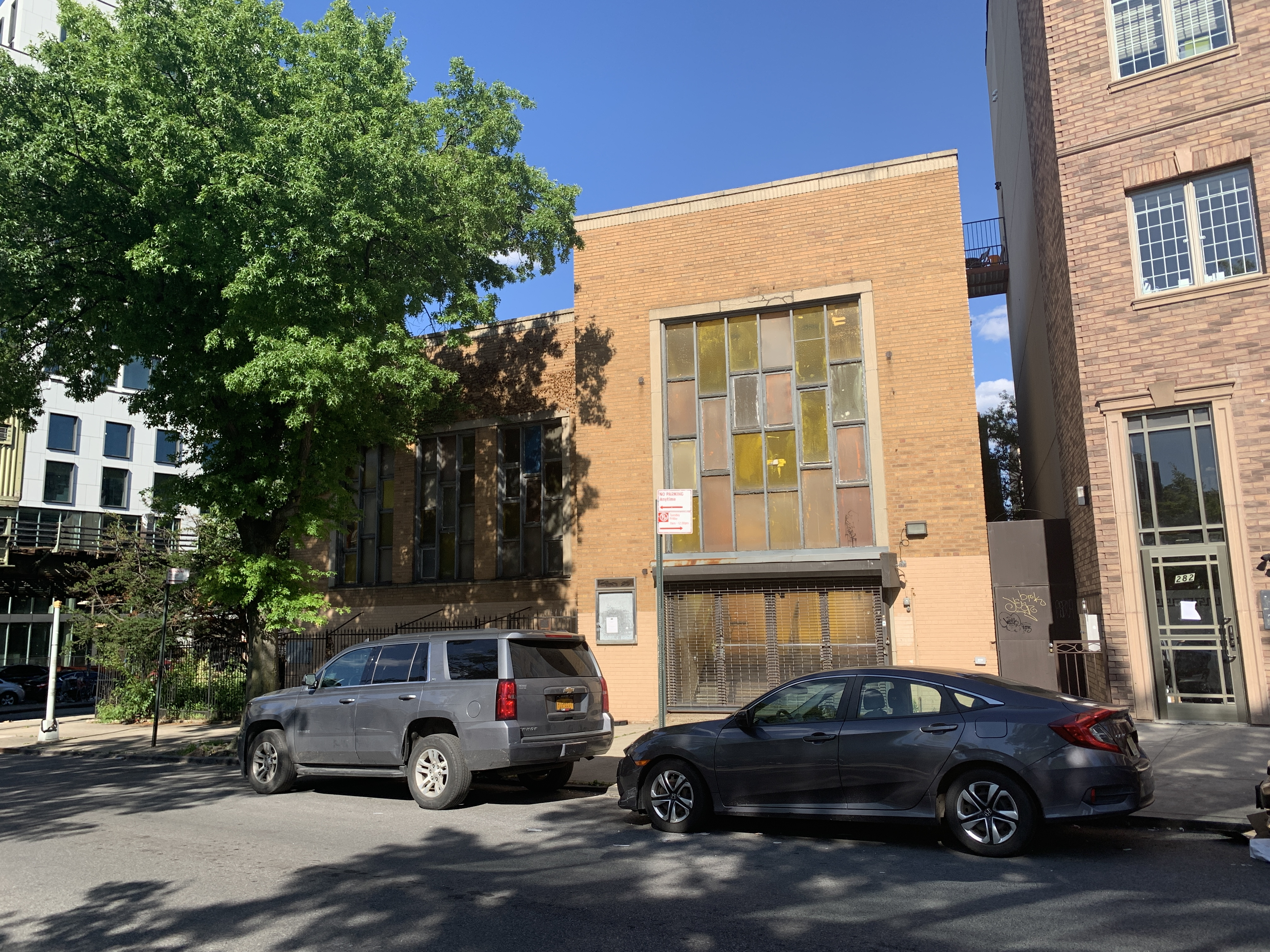
- Beth Jacob Ohev Sholom synagogue in 2021

- Location in New York City

Religion
- Affiliation: Orthodox Judaism
- Rite: Nusach Ashkenaz
- Ecclesiastical or organisational status: Synagogue
- Leadership: Collective/Elected
- Status: Fully functional; two distinct Shabbos davenings

Location
- Location: 284 Rodney Street, Williamsburg, Brooklyn, New York City, New York 11211
- Country: United States
- Coordinates: 40°42′28″N 73°57′24″W

Architecture
- Established: 1869 (as a congregation)
- Completed: 1870 Keap Street); 1906 (South Third Street); 1957 (Rodney Street)

Website
- congbjos.org

Congregation Beth Jacob Ohev Sholom (also known as Congregation Beth Jacob Ohev Shalom) (Hebrew: בית כנסת בית יעקב אוהב שלום, lit. 'House of Jacob Lover of Peace') is an Orthodox Jewish synagogue located at 284 Rodney Street in Williamsburg, Brooklyn, in New York City, New York, United States. The congregation follows the Ashkenazi rite.

Founded in 1869 by German Jews as an Orthodox breakaway from an existing Reform congregation, it is the oldest Orthodox congregation on Long Island (including Brooklyn and Queens), and one of the last remaining non-Hasidic Jewish institutions in Williamsburg.

The congregation constructed its first building on Keap Street in 1870. In 1904 it merged with Chevra Ansche Sholom, and took the name Congregation Beth Jacob Anshe Sholom. The following year it constructed a new building at 274–276 South Third Street, designed by George F. Pelham, consecrated in 1906. In the 1950s, this building was expropriated and demolished to make way for the Brooklyn-Queens Expressway. The congregation combined with another congregation in a similar situation, and, in 1957, as Congregation Beth Jacob Ohev Sholom, constructed a new building at 284 Rodney Street, just south of Broadway.

Rabbi Joshua Fishman served as rabbi from 1971 until his retirement in 2014. With changing demographics, attendance at services, which had been 700 in the 1970s, fell to two dozen by 2010.

Since then, amidst a number of attempts at Rabbis, the congregation has pivotted to functionally lay led, in light of the failure of several subsequent Rabbis to do other than a range of calumnies, some of which are well publicized and still in court dispute

== Early history ==
The congregation was founded as Beth Jacob in 1869, by more traditional members of an existing Reform German Jewish synagogue, the Keap Street Temple. They objected to the installation and use of a pipe organ to accompany Yom Kippur services, which was forbidden by halakha (Jewish law), and seceded and created their own congregation. The new congregation was formally incorporated on October 1 of that year, and first worshiped in a house. In 1870, Beth Jacob purchased a 23-foot (7.0 m) by 95-foot (29 m) lot at what is now 326 Keap Street (then Tenth Street) for $150 (today $3,800) in cash and a mortgage of $1,050 (today $26,700), and constructed a building there, at a cost of around $6,000 (today $153,000). Men and women sat separately, and the sanctuary had seating for 164 men on the main floor and 135 women in the gallery. Services were generally held only on Shabbat and the Jewish holidays. The first spiritual leader was Rabbi Dresser, and he was succeeded by Lewis Lewinski (or Levinsky).

In its early years, the congregation's financial situation was precarious. The building was located ten blocks from where most of the congregants and potential congregants lived (on Grand Street, near the ferry docks), and attendance was low. Even on the High Holy Days, the sanctuary was rarely more than half full. The synagogue employed a rabbi, gabbai, and cantor, and annual expenses often exceeded the congregation's income (which came primarily from the sale of seats). To remain solvent, the congregation borrowed money against the equity in the building: $2,000 (today $72,000) in 1888, and another $2,000 in 1894.

The congregation was also marked by public controversies and factionalism. In January 1887, during a heated discussion at a congregational business meeting, one member addressed two others with the informal German "du" (rather than the formal "Sie"), which was considered impolite. Despite attempts by then-rabbi Lewinski to intervene, the two men beat the first, knocked him to the ground, and "trampled upon" him. The two men were subsequently charged with "assault in the third degree".

Lewinski was succeeded that year as rabbi by Hyman Rosenberg, and in October of the same year a new secretary was elected, in a close-fought battle between two factions. When it was time for the former secretary to hand over the financial books, a member, Simon Freudenthal, was alleged to have grabbed them, jumped out a window, and ran away with them. When he returned, he refused to say why he took them, and insisted he would keep them. A warrant was issued for his arrest on the charge of larceny, and he was released on bail. Ten days later the synagogue president, American Civil War veteran Colonel Solomon Monday, was arrested and charged in turn with libel, for allegedly claiming that Freudenthal stole "sacred books". Monday, in turn, had Freudenthal charged in November with stealing $8 (today $290) worth of "sacred books" during "divine service". Later that month both cases were dismissed. In early 1888, another case was brought, and dismissed, over attempts by one faction to expel members of the other faction.

In December 1892, the congregation expelled Rosenberg, charging him with eating a piece of pork, which is not kosher. To augment his salary of $400 (today $14,300) a year from Beth Jacob, Rosenberg also worked as an agent for a cigar company. While visiting a customer at a bar, he was alleged to have eaten the pork while partaking of some of the free lunch provided there. Rosenberg initially said that while he had drunk a great deal, he had not eaten anything at all, and subsequently stated that he was sure he had not eaten pork, because the bar-keep had sworn in affidavit that there was none in the lunch provided that day. Rosenberg later averred consistently that if he had eaten any pork, it was inadvertently. He also alleged hypocrisy on the part of the members, stating "They are all reformed Jews in private, although orthodox Jews in public."

The rabbi's defenders strongly objected to the decision. His primary supporter, synagogue vice president Louis Jackson, who had broken the story to the press, described the congregation as a "collection of jackasses", with the "chief jackass" being the president Louis Schwartz, who Jackson accused of eating ham himself, and of stealing from the synagogue's charity boxes. Jackson was expelled from the congregation, and subsequently convicted of libel and fined $100 (today $3,600) for making the accusations, while Rosenberg sued the synagogue for his salary. Rosenberg died of pneumonia in April 1893, at the age of 43, his "health and spirits", according to a contemporary New York Times report, "broken" by the expulsion. At the funeral, Jackson berated the congregation's members, who, he charged, had "hounded, hunted, driven [Rosenberg] to a grave of misery", and allegedly threatened to kill one of them with a stone taken from the newly dug grave. Charges were again brought against Jackson, but this time were dismissed, with the Justice stating "it looks as if it were an even thing all around."

A month later, Beth Jacob hired Abraham Salbaum as rabbi. The following year, the synagogue's two-story frame synagogue building at 326 Keap Street, valued at $2,000 (today $74,000), was struck by lightning and almost completely destroyed. The congregation decided to rebuild at the same location.

== Early twentieth century ==
Many working class German Jews moved from the Lower East Side to Williamsburg after the Williamsburg Bridge was completed in 1903, providing access to Manhattan. In January 1904, Beth Jacob merged with Chevra Ansche Sholom, a synagogue that had been founded the year before. The combined congregation took the name Beth Jacob Anshe Sholom. Chevra Ansche Sholom worshiped in a Masonic Temple, and had a number of assets, including two houses at 184–186 South Third Street valued at $6,500 (today $233,000), with a mortgage of $4,500 (today $161,000). At the time, Beth Jacob's own building was valued at $6,000 (today $215,000), with a mortgage of $2,000 (today $72,000).

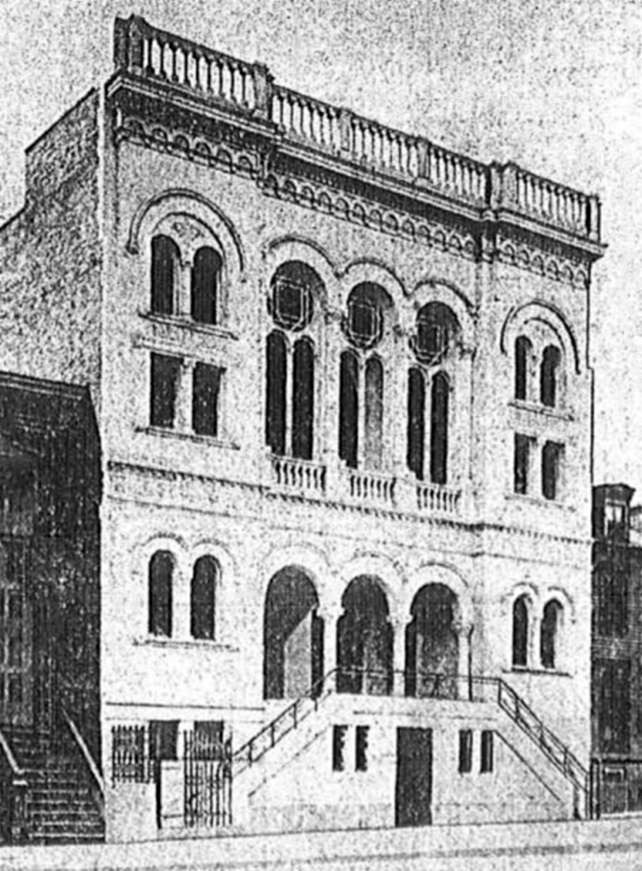
Beth Jacob Anshe Sholom synagogue on South Third Street in September 1906

Beth Jacob Anshe Sholom exchanged the deeds for houses at 184–186 South Third Street for a property at 274–276 South Third Street in June 1905. It hired architect George F. Pelham to draw up plans for a new building, instructing him to copy the prominent Congregation Shaaray Tefila building on Manhattan's West 82nd Street, designed by Arnold Brunner, and known as the "West End Synagogue". Features of the new design included seating for almost 1,000 in the main sanctuary, a Talmud Torah for Hebrew language instruction in the basement, electric lighting, and steam heating. Construction was expected to cost $75,000 (today $2,690,000). Beth Jacob Anshe Sholom erected the building at 274–276 South Third Street, and sold Beth Jacob's building at 326 Keap Street to the North Side Chevre, a new congregation.

Ground was broken in June 1905, the cornerstone was laid in September, and the new building was dedicated by then-rabbi Dr. H. Veld on September 9, 1906, in time for High Holy Day services to be held there that year. The actual cost of construction was around $60,000 (today $2,150,000), of which $35,000 (today $1,250,000) was raised through sale of seats and donations, and the rest via a mortgage. The improved premises attracted many new members.

In February 1907, the congregation created a four-room Talmud Torah. In September of that year Samuel Rabinowitz was hired as rabbi for a three-year term, renewed in 1910 for another three years. A "junior congregation" was created from the members of the Talmud Torah. They elected, as their first "pupil rabbi", Harry Halpern, who later served for five decades as rabbi of the East Midwood Jewish Center.

Rabinowitz resigned in indignation in May 1912, stating the trustees did not live up to the terms of his contract, after Herman Heisman, chairman of the synagogue's board of trustees, hired an assistant rabbi, whose services Rabinowitz objected to. Rabinowitz purchased for $50,000 (today $1,670,000) a church building at South 5th Street and Marcy Avenue, and started his own synagogue there. His first Saturday services had an attendance of 1,200, a third of whom were his former congregants, and he stated that "his flock" would soon join him.

Rabinowitz was succeeded as rabbi of Beth Jacob Anshe Sholom in December 1912 by Wolf Gold. Born in Szczecin, Poland (then Stettin, Germany) in 1889, he was the descendant of at least eight generations of rabbis, and received his own rabbinic ordination in 1906, at age 17. He emigrated to the United States the following year, and served as rabbi of congregations in Chicago, Illinois and Scranton, Pennsylvania before coming to Williamsburg.

A strong proponent of Religious Zionism, Gold helped found in New York the first branch of Mizrahi (the Religious Zionists of America) in the United States in 1914 (he would subsequently assist in the founding of many of its other branches in North America). That year, the congregation purchased for the growing Talmud Torah the First United Presbyterian Church building at South 1st and Rodney Streets, at a cost of $20,050 (today $644,000). Many classrooms were added in the lower auditorium, and the building was dedicated as the "Talmud Torah of Williamsburg" in December.

In 1917, Gold was one of the founders of Yeshiva Torah Vodaas, and was its first president. He would serve at Beth Jacob Anshe Sholom until 1919, moving to a pulpit in San Francisco. That year the congregation had 155 member families. Gold would emigrate to Palestine in 1935, and was one of the signatories of the Israeli Declaration of Independence.

Gold was succeeded as rabbi by Solomon Golobowsky. The congregation had decided by 1918 that the Talmud Torah should become independent: during Golobowsky's tenure, in 1921, it demolished the church building housing the school, and built in its place a new building, with 18 classrooms and an auditorium. The school was incorporated as the "Hebrew School of Williamsburg", and title to the building and property was transferred from the synagogue to it in July of that year. The school in turn assumed a mortgage of $15,000 (today $270,000) and additional debts of around $10,700 (today $190,000).

Isaac Bunin succeeded Golobowsky as rabbi in December 1926. Born in Malistovka, Krasnopoli (near Mogilev, Belarus) in 1882, he had emigrated to the United States in 1923. While practicing as a rabbi in Russia, he issued a responsum in 1908 that permitted Jews to shoot—on the Sabbath—anarchist communists who terrorized local Jewish communities, and extorted "contributions" from them. Before coming to Beth Jacob Anshe Sholom he served as rabbi in Trenton, New Jersey, where he was instrumental in the creation of the re-established Dr. Theodor Herzl's Zion Hebrew School (opened October 1926).

== Post-World War II ==
Following World War II and the Holocaust, large numbers of Hasidic and haredi Jewish refugees immigrated to Williamsburg. The congregation initially had poor relations with these groups, but these later improved with some segments of the Hasidic community. The synagogue celebrated Bunin's Silver Jubilee as rabbi in March, 1951. His work Hegyonot Yitzhak was published in 1953.

The old Jewish area of Williamsburg east of Broadway was strongly impacted by the construction of the Brooklyn-Queens Expressway in the 1950s. The congregation's building was expropriated and demolished. It joined with another large Ashkenazi synagogue in the same situation, and in 1957 the merged congregations constructed the current building at the edge of the "Jewish Triangle", just west of Broadway. In 1965, Chaim A. Pincus was the rabbi.

Joshua Fishman, described by George Kranzler as "a renowned scholar and orator," became the rabbi of the congregation in 1971. He also served from 1982 as head of Torah Umesorah – National Society for Hebrew Day Schools. At the time Fishman became rabbi, as many as 700 people would attend Beth Jacob Ohev Sholom's services.

One of the members in the 1990s and 2000s was Marty Needelman. He was project director for Brooklyn Legal Services, which provided legal services to low-income Brooklyn residents, and was a member of the executive committees of both the synagogue and of Los Sures, a Williamsburg community-based housing group. Another notable congregant is Steve Cohn, the Democratic District Leader and lawyer whose father was involved with the synagogue, and who had his Bar Mitzvah there.

Samuel Heilman wrote in 1996 that Beth Jacob Ohev Sholom was one of four Williamsburg institutions that served to "anchor the community around them", and "in effect geographically engulf and cancel" the ability of prominent local churches to "dominate the neighborhood". By the mid-1990s, however, the synagogue attracted only 300 to 400 generally elderly Ashkenazi men and women for High Holy Day services, most of whom lived in "public high rise projects", and Fishman doubted that Williamsburg's only remaining Orthodox Nusach Ashkenaz synagogue still holding regular services would survive. By 2010, Shabbat attendance was around two dozen worshipers, and weekday attendance half that.

As of 2010, Beth Jacob Ohev Sholom was the oldest Orthodox congregation on Long Island (including Brooklyn and Queens), and, according to Brooklyn Eagle journalist Raanan Geberer, "one of the few remnants of the non-Hasidic Jewish community that thrived in Williamsburg until the 1960s". No Conservative or Reform synagogues presently exist in the neighborhood; Rabbi Fishman retired in 2014 and died February 9, 2023.

== Post 2014 ==
With Joshua Fishman's retirement, the challenge of replacement became a deep vulnerability. Rabbis would be hired, be exposed for some crime or vice or failure or another and be necessarily dismissed: This led to a pivot to lay leadership, everyone in the shul (but especially the Gabbai, Tibor Rosenblum) comfortable and familiar with the liturgy and synagogue customs to collectively just keep doing everything until a new Rabbi would emerge—as well as a means to pay one.

This mission was challenged by the totemic conservativism of the community: "Modern" Orthodox yes, but not "Open Orthodox". A historic member of the community returned and attempted to wrest control, before his history of suspected and accused child abuse emerged amidst his efforts.

In order to prevent a similar take-over of the shul, the administration began empowering more people as members, and even trustees, from the nearby Satmar Hassidic Community. A rabbi was eventually hired, but he was outed as a liar and philanderer by a private detective who contacted the Synagogue on behalf of the woman who the erstwhile Rabbi had taken up with, and this led to a longer period of time with no official Rabbi.

A local organization formed within the shul called JCYES. It would proceed to gain access to Federal Funding, despite a documented and attested absence of activities or services.

== 2020 and post Covid ==
As described by Samantha Max in Gothamist:

"Ruiz said the congregation wanted to extend the welcoming spirit when, several years ago, a small group of Hasidic Jews asked if they could pray at the synagogue. At the same time the number of Beth Jacob Ohev Sholom’s non-Hasidic congregants was diminishing, Ruiz said, Williamsburg’s population of Hasidic Jews — who speak Yiddish and follow strict religious doctrines — was growing. Even though Hasidic Jews have different customs, she said, it seemed like this group wanted to help to revive the shrinking congregation.

“We trusted anybody who came, and we were open to anybody who came here,” she said.

Ruiz and other long-time members now worry they may have been too open. They say the Hasidic group co-opted board elections to put their allies in power and remove those who disagreed with them. At one election in 2022, Ruiz said, they wouldn’t let several long-time congregants cast their ballots, including Needelman, because he didn’t bring a utility bill.

Chananya Groner describes in Shtetl:

"While tensions at Beth Jacob Ohev Sholom are now at their highest, they have been long brewing, ever since some among the newcomers orchestrated a kind of hostile takeover.

The newcomers originally began drifting to Beth Jacob Ohev Sholom nearly two decades ago, during the mid 2000s. Most had been raised nearby, within Satmar and other Hasidic sects. Among them were Masri, Ruttner, Leichter, and a score of others.

Masri had been raised in Williamsburg’s Satmar community, but his parents are from Argentina, of Sefardic background. Fluent in both Yiddish and Spanish, he is a well-known independent political operative who advises elected officials and local candidates for public office. Those who know him cite his ability to act as a bridge between the Satmar community and its Black and Latino neighbors.

Ruttner, who is from a more conventional Satmar background, was convicted for credit card fraud in the ‘90s. While doing time in federal prison, he had something of a religious awakening and, upon his release, began to style himself a rabbi. He began giving Torah lectures at a Hasidic synagogue near Beth Jacob Ohev Sholom, attracting a group of young Hasidic men who, for various reasons, felt out of place in their original communities. The group soon migrated over to Beth Jacob Ohev Sholom, becoming the core of a new cohort at the historic shul.

When they first joined, the newcomers were welcomed. One congregant who asked not to be named says he understood them. “These people were misfits or dropouts of the Hasidic system. They didn’t feel welcome in other places. They wanted to find a place where they wouldn’t be judged.”

Ruiz, too, saw a potentially invigorating force. “When the young Hasidim started to come, we embraced them,” Ruiz recalls. She remembers being the young blood herself, when she’d joined the synagogue back in the ‘80s: “Oh, we were so young. Everybody said, ‘Oh, new blood.’ Now we are the old blood,” she laughs.

“But we were very respectful of the older people,” she adds, which she pointedly contrasts with the behavior among some of the newcomers, including some who show little deference to the older congregants."

Then, as described in  Greenline Magazine:

"According to Keith Kohn, who served as president of the board of CBJOS and remains president according to The Congregation, a small group of Hasidic Jews began worshiping at CBJOS around ten years ago. The Congregation had welcomed the newcomers to their community. They did not foresee this act of fellowship would lead to the destruction of their sanctuary last September.

A pile of shattered pews is a heartbreaking site. Broken and splintered hardwood, which in its former life supported The Congregation’s faithful as they sat and prayed for decades, filled the ground floor of CBJOS on September 17, 2024. Planks engraved with Stars of David, the former pew ends, were cast about. According to The Congregation, this was the doing of the Leichter Faction who had leased out the synagogue to Yeshiva Ohel Elozer, a Satmar boys’ high school. The Congregation states the Leichter Faction only had agency to lease the basement.

This destruction in order to make room for the school, was despite a ruling that stated the yeshiva couldn’t move in at present — made in the Kings County Supreme Court a week prior.

Congregation Beth Jacob Ohev Shalom (CBJOS) was filled with the remnants of broken pews, due to a rival board’s effort to clear the synagogue to make way for the yeshiva they rented it out to.

“Their intention of taking over the synagogue, did not happen overnight, but was a plan step by step by the evil ones like Israel Leichter and his brother Abraham, Marcos Masri and Chaim Ruttner, then they brought Joel Gross and Rebeca Masri, and then when they established themselves they brought in the money guys, Jacob Jacobwitz, Abraham Ruben, and Elozar Porge,” said Ruiz.

Early in 2024, The Congregation began to confront the Leichter Faction for what they perceived as misconduct and the possible mishandling of funds.

At CBJOS, Chaim Ruttner and Marcos Masri had installed the Jewish Coalition for Youth Education & Support (JC YES) to receive public funds for youth services provided on the premises. Members of The Congregation began to question if any services were actually provided. Their suspicions were fueled by the knowledge that Ruttner was convicted for credit card fraud in the ‘90s and served time in federal prison — where he found religion.

“NYC has an ongoing investigation of JC YES since 2021 due to their activities. [They are] investigating the synagogue because JC YES was occupying [CBJOS]. There was a comingling of funds. We would see checks going to the synagogue instead of the troubled youth. Officers of the congregation were interviewed by the Department of Investigation in March 2024,” said Kohn.

Another on Ruiz’s watch list, Elozar Porge, pled guilty to wire fraud for submitting phony documents to the feds from 2013 to 2016 stating that Central United Talmudic Academy, which he led, was feeding dinners to at-risk kids according to court records. The New York Post reported on Oct. 25, 2019 Porge was sentenced to two years in federal prison for taking $3.2M in government funds that were furnished to feed kids in need. The prosecutor’s claim was the money went instead to social events for adults and also bar mitzvahs and bat mitzvahs in a banquet hall.

Other accusations of fraud, some concerning the selling of cemetery plots, have been made by The Congregation.

The Leichter Faction then worked to remove The Congregation members from the board, targeting the ones who made these accusations.

“They initiated a lockout in July, to prevent an election and the board from doing business. They went to court to remove members with restraining orders,” said Kohn. “A membership meeting and election was scheduled for August 29, 2024. The other side saw they were going to lose control. So they held a meeting on August 26 to move the yeshiva into the building at below market rate. This wasn’t really about a lease, but a move to take over the building.”

A couple of weeks later a notice from the Leichter Faction went up on the door of CBJOS, announcing a special board meeting on September 15 at 10 a.m. The agenda listed requests to remove two board members and members of The Congregation, Martin Needelman and America Ruiz. Needelman and Ruiz are husband and wife, were married at CBJOS, raised their family there, and have been worshiping there since the 1980s.

A little more than an hour later, Kate Yourke reported in a private Facebook group, “The pews [are] already removed and stacked outside. The building is being stripped despite a court order making clear that this administration is not legitimate, valid, or allowed to do anything like rent or sell the shul.”

Then on September 17, broken pews filled CBJOS.

According to Kohn, a Temporary Restraining Order (TRO) was granted to The Congregation, shortly after that day. “We came back, put up card tables and chairs and started to pray for three to four weeks. Then the rogue board came to harass and disrupt services. They put locks on the doors during the holiest week, then there was physical violence, theft.”

Pew ends engraved with the Star of David were part of the rubble left by the destruction. The Congregation has documented a timeline of events at CBJOS. The following is some of what this timeline states happened on December 21, 2024. “Kohn was assaulted, knocked down and kicked, by Jacobowitz and Rubin. The NYPD’s 90th Precinct arrived shone a flashlight on Kohn’s face and said they didn’t see any bruising and determined Keith’s assault was harassment. Keith later went to the police station and gave a report but no charges resulted.”

This timeline also records, “since Sunday January 19, 2024, the Members have been locked out of the building. Jacobowitz put locks on all doors and gates. Even when told by police that they must let other congregants in, he has refused, saying ‘This is my house, you are saying I should allow strangers into my house?’ (paraphrasing here – we have this on video).”

On January 21, 2025 the Leichter Faction went to court to get a TRO to compel the board to allow the lease and let the developers begin work. Kohn reported they filed it by paper, which hadn’t been done in five years. This way The Congregation wasn’t notified and there was no digital reference. This [TRO] was challenged by The Congregation. But the developers working with the Leichter Faction saw a loophole, came into CBJOS and “gutted where we read the Torah and ripped up the flooring tiles which had asbestos” said Kohn.

Further work was halted on January 31, 2025 by the Department of Buildings (DOB) who issued a partial vacate order due to “conditions within the premises are imminently perilous to life and re-entry is prohibited until such conditions have been eliminated to the satisfaction of the Department.”

Another court date followed. The Leichter Faction had claimed that the yeshiva had moved in and the renovation work needed to continue. The DOB testified on the building’s status and the judge saw the condition of the building wouldn’t support the Leichter Faction’s claim.

This March, a three-day hearing was convened for the Judge Richard Montelione to determine who is the true board and custodian of the congregation. Closing arguments for this were submitted at the end of March."

They are now set for June.

Every single day, there has continually been Mincha/Maariv at the shul. Sometimes outside if necessary, and the weather demands. It remains the longest running Orthodox congregation doing so in Brooklyn.

== Citations ==
- Abelow, Samuel Philip. History of Brooklyn Jewry, Scheba Publishing Company, 1937.
- Abelow, Samuel P., "The Jews of Williamsburg", in Hurwitz, Solomon Theodore Halivy. The Jewish Forum: A Monthly Magazine, Volume 31, The Jewish Forum Publishing Co., 1948.
- American Jewish Committee. ""Directory of Local Organizations"" (PDF). Archived from the original (PDF) on 2012-02-17. (2.12 MB), American Jewish Year Book, Jewish Publication Society, Volume 1 (1899–1900).
- American Jewish Committee. ""Directories"" (PDF). Archived from the original (PDF) on 2010-06-13. (6.06 MB), American Jewish Year Book, Jewish Publication Society, Volume 21 (1919–20).
- Brooklyn Eagle, no byline:
  - "Cohen Kicked. A Fight in an Eastern District Synagogue.", Brooklyn Eagle, January 10, 1887.
  - "Stolen Books. The Thief Jumped Through a Synagogue Window.", Brooklyn Eagle, October 18, 1887.
  - "A Synagogue in Court. One of the Congregation Makes a Charge of Libel Against Another.", Brooklyn Eagle, October 28, 1887.
  - "Irate Israelites. The Troubles of Congregation Beth Jacob in the Eastern District.", Brooklyn Eagle, November 16, 1887.
  - "Synagogue Beth Jacob Out Of Court", Brooklyn Eagle, November 28, 1887.
  - "Trouble in Beth Jacob. Members of the Congregation Appeal to the Law.", Brooklyn Eagle, March 8, 1888.
  - "May Be Expelled. The Court Cannot Prevent a Synagogue From Taking Action.", Brooklyn Eagle, March 14, 1888.
  - "Judaism in Brooklyn. The Ancient Faith of Israel and Its Local Adherents.", Brooklyn Eagle, September 27, 1891.
  - "How They Regard Ham. Views of Local Rabbis on Mr. Rosenburg's Expulsion.", Brooklyn Eagle, December 16, 1892.
  - "Rabbi Rosenberg Stayed at Home, And All Was Very Quiet at the Temple Beth Jacob This Morning", Brooklyn Eagle, December 17, 1892.
  - "The Beth Jacob People. They Had an Exiting Time at a Meeting Last Night", Brooklyn Eagle, January 12, 1893.
  - "The Beth Jacob Church Fight. Louis Jackson Found Guilty of Criminal Libel.", Brooklyn Eagle, February 3, 1893.
  - "A Rabbi for Beth Jacob, And President Schwartz Says Perfect Harmony Now Reigns", Brooklyn Eagle, May 9, 1893.
  - "Justice Goetting Discharged Him", Brooklyn Eagle, May 25, 1893.
  - "Struck a Synagogue. Lighting's Freak in the Eastern District.", Brooklyn Eagle, July 15, 1894.
  - "Real Estate Market. Equal Rights Demanded in the Transfer of Property", Brooklyn Eagle, September 5, 1894.
  - "New Synagogue Opened. Handsome House of Worship Dedicated in South Third Street." Brooklyn Eagle, September 10, 1906.
  - "New Rabbi Welcomed. Will Take Charge of Street Congregation." Brooklyn Eagle, December 9, 1912.
- Carper, James C.; Hunt, Thomas C. The Praeger Handbook of Religion and Education in the United States, Praeger Publishers, 2009. ISBN 978-0-275-99227-9
- Cohen, Chester G. Shtetl Finder: Jewish Communities in the 19th and early 20th Centuries in the Pale of Settlement of Russia and Poland, and in Lithuania, Latvia, Galicia, and Bukovina, with Names of Residents, Heritage Books, 1989. ISBN 978-1-55613-248-3
- Evening Post (New York), no byline:
  - "Notes of Jewish Churches and Communities", The Evening Post (New York), July 29, 1905.
  - "Cornerstone of New Synagogue Laid", The Evening Post (New York), September 18, 1905.
- Geberer, Raanan. "Brooklyn’s Oldest Orthodox Synagogue Celebrates Birthday. 1869 Institution Is Survivor Of Non-Hasidic Williamsburg", Brooklyn Eagle, May 17, 2010.
- Heilman, Samuel C. Sliding to the Right: The Contest for the Future of American Jewish Orthodoxy, University of California Press, 2006. ISBN 978-0-520-23136-8
- Hughes, Howard L. "Chapter XIV: Schools and Libraries", A History of Trenton 1679 — 1929, Trenton Historical Society, 1929.
- Johnson, Cecil. "News in Brief: Around the Borough", Brooklyn Eagle, March 13, 1951.
- Kaufman, David. Shul with a Pool: The "synagogue-center" in American Jewish History, Brandeis University Press, University Press of New England, 1999. ISBN 978-0-87451-893-1
- Kranzler, George. Hasidic Williamsburg: A Contemporary American Hasidic Community, Jason Aronson, 1995. ISBN 978-1-56821-242-5.
- Landman, Isaac., "Trenton", The Universal Jewish Encyclopedia, Volume 10, Universal Jewish Encyclopedia Co. Inc., 1943.
- McKenna, Sheila. "Brooklyn Profile/Martin S. Needelman", Newsday (Brooklyn edition), October 1, 1992, p. 28.
- New York Times, no byline:
  - ""Fighting by an Open Grave.; Trouble at Rabbi Rosenberg's Funeral that's to be Told in Court."" (PDF)., The New York Times, April 19, 1893.
- Oser, Asher. "Torah Umesorah", Jewish Virtual Library, 2008. Retrieved June 5, 2010.
- Pomdore, Harry J. "Chapter VIII: Churches and Religious Institutions", A History of Trenton 1679 — 1929, Trenton Historical Society, 1929.
- Powledge, Fred. "The Poor Convene in Williamsburg; Meet to Choose Leaders in Antipoverty Campaign", The New York Times, August 25, 1965, p. 48.
- Shapiro, Marc B. "Rabbis and Communism", the Seforim blog, March, 2008.
- Sherman, Moshe D. Orthodox Judaism in America: A Biographical Dictionary and Sourcebook, Greenwood Publishing Group, 1996. ISBN 978-0-313-24316-5
- Sun (New York), no byline:
  - "New Synagogue a Success. War in Williamsburg Splits a Jewish Congregation", The Sun (New York), June 17, 1912.
- Teitz Blau, Rivkah. Learn Torah, Love Torah, Live Torah: HaRav Mordechai Pinchas Teitz, the Quintessential Rabbi, KTAV Publishing House, 2001. ISBN 978-0-88125-718-2
