= Millinery Center Synagogue =

Orthodox synagogue in Manhattan, New York

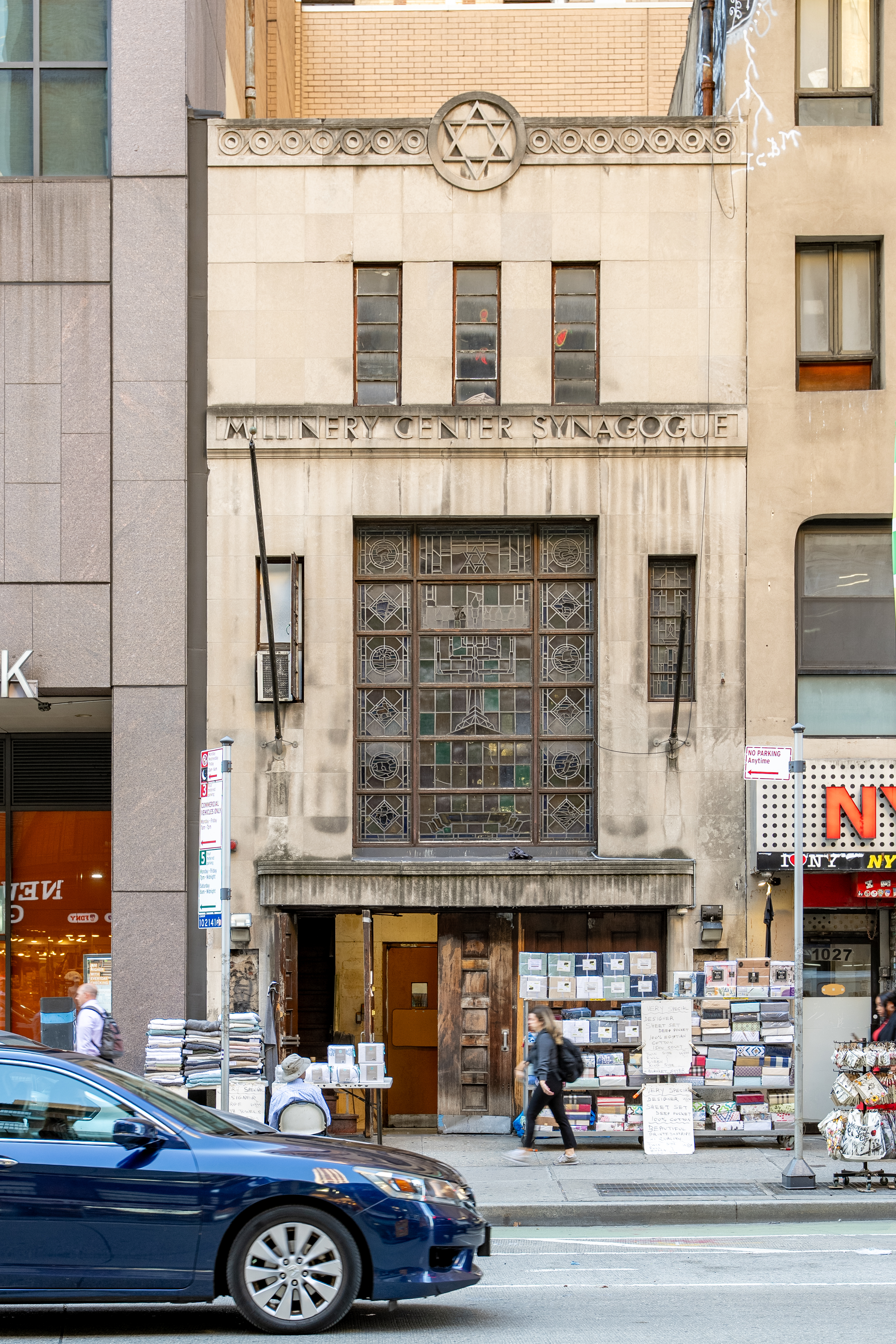
- (2025)

- Location within Manhattan

Religion
- Affiliation: Orthodox Judaism
- Ecclesiastical or organizational status: Synagogue
- Leadership: Rabbi Avrohom Dov Kahn
- Year consecrated: September 12, 1948
- Status: Active

Location
- Location: 1025 6th Avenue (38th St), Manhattan, New York City, New York 10018
- Country: United States
- Interactive map of Millinery Center Synagogue
- Coordinates: 40°45′09″N 73°59′10″W

Architecture
- Architect: Hyman Isaac "H.I." Feldman
- Type: Synagogue
- Style: Modernist; Art Deco
- Founder: Moe Brillstein; Sam Neger
- Established: 1933 (as a congregation)
- Completed: 1948
- Construction cost: $150,000

Specifications
- Capacity: 125 worshippers
- Length: 60 feet (18 m)
- Width: 19 feet (5.8 m)
- Materials: Limestone

Website
- millinerycs.org

Millinery Center Synagogue is an Orthodox Jewish synagogue located in the Garment District of Manhattan, in New York City, New York, United States.

== History ==
The synagogue was supported by the many millinery organizations that were based in the neighborhood. A group of these ready-to-wear industry business men had been meeting in various spaces, mostly in a loft on West 36th Street. Their rabbi during this very loosely organized time was Rabbi Moshe Ralbag. In January 1933, the congregation was more formally organized and the name of the synagogue, the Millinery Center Synagogue, was agreed upon, although the meeting place was temporary, at 1011 Sixth Avenue, on the second floor. Moe Brillstein (the father of film producer Bernie Brillstein) became president and started a building fund. At that point the congregation came together and decided to build a synagogue.

Due to the density of millinery businesses in the neighborhood, at its peak, services for daily minyan were typically so heavily attended that the prayer sessions were held in rotating shifts.

== Structure ==
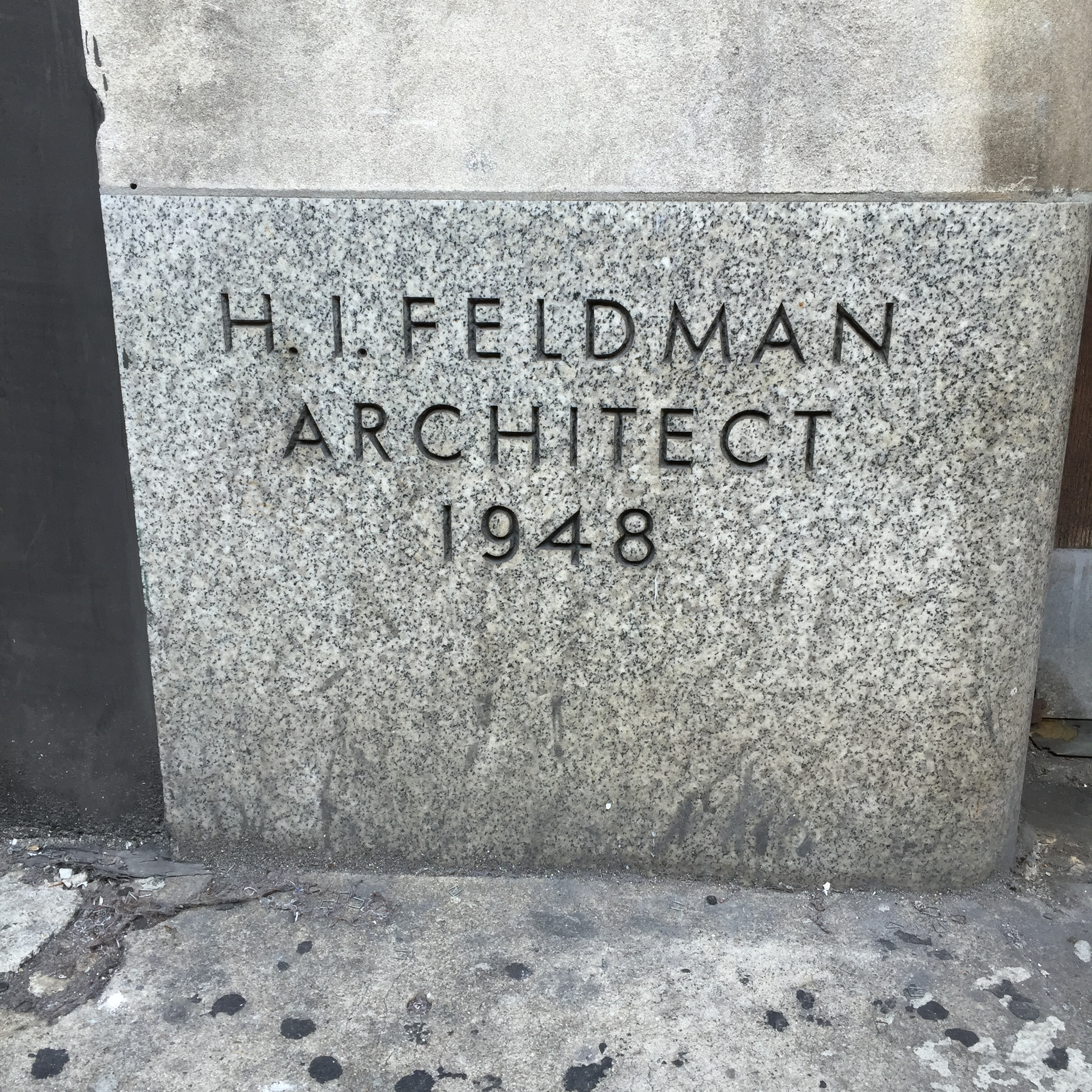
A stone on the façade, marking the architect, H.I. Feldman

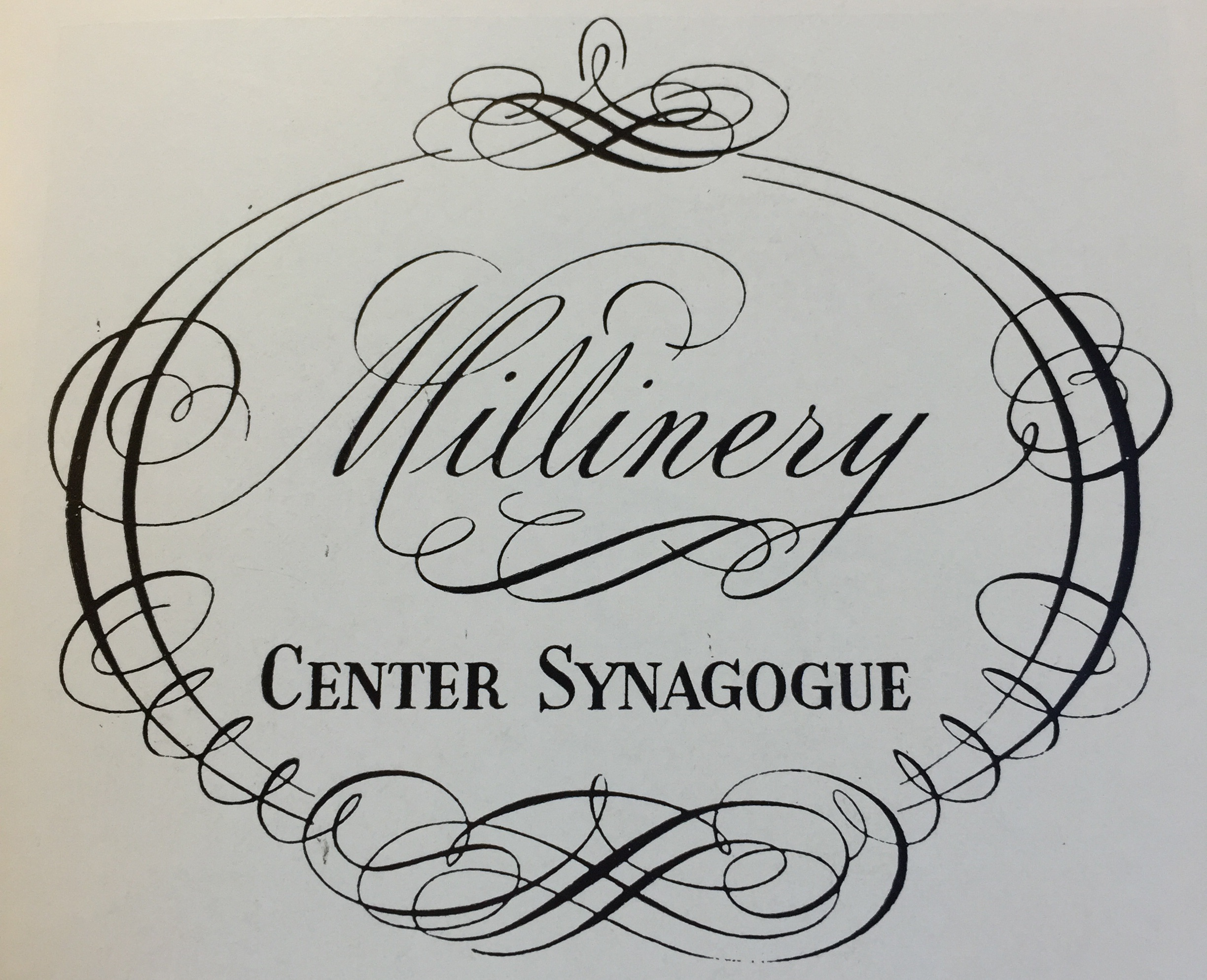
Millinery Center logo

The synagogue was designed by H.I. Feldman, a prolific, Yale-educated architect who designed thousands of Art Deco and Modernist-style buildings in New York City, notably 1025 Fifth Avenue (between 83rd and 84th Streets) on the Upper East Side and the LaGuardia Houses on the Lower East Side, as well as many buildings that line the Grand Concourse in the Bronx. Feldman and his company, The Feldman Company, also built the Federation of Jewish Philanthropies building (130 East 59th Street) and the United Jewish Appeal building (220 West 58th Street).

There were wartime restrictions on building, so building was postponed for a time until 1947. The building's construction was completed in September 1948, and the synagogue was dedicated on September 12, 1948.

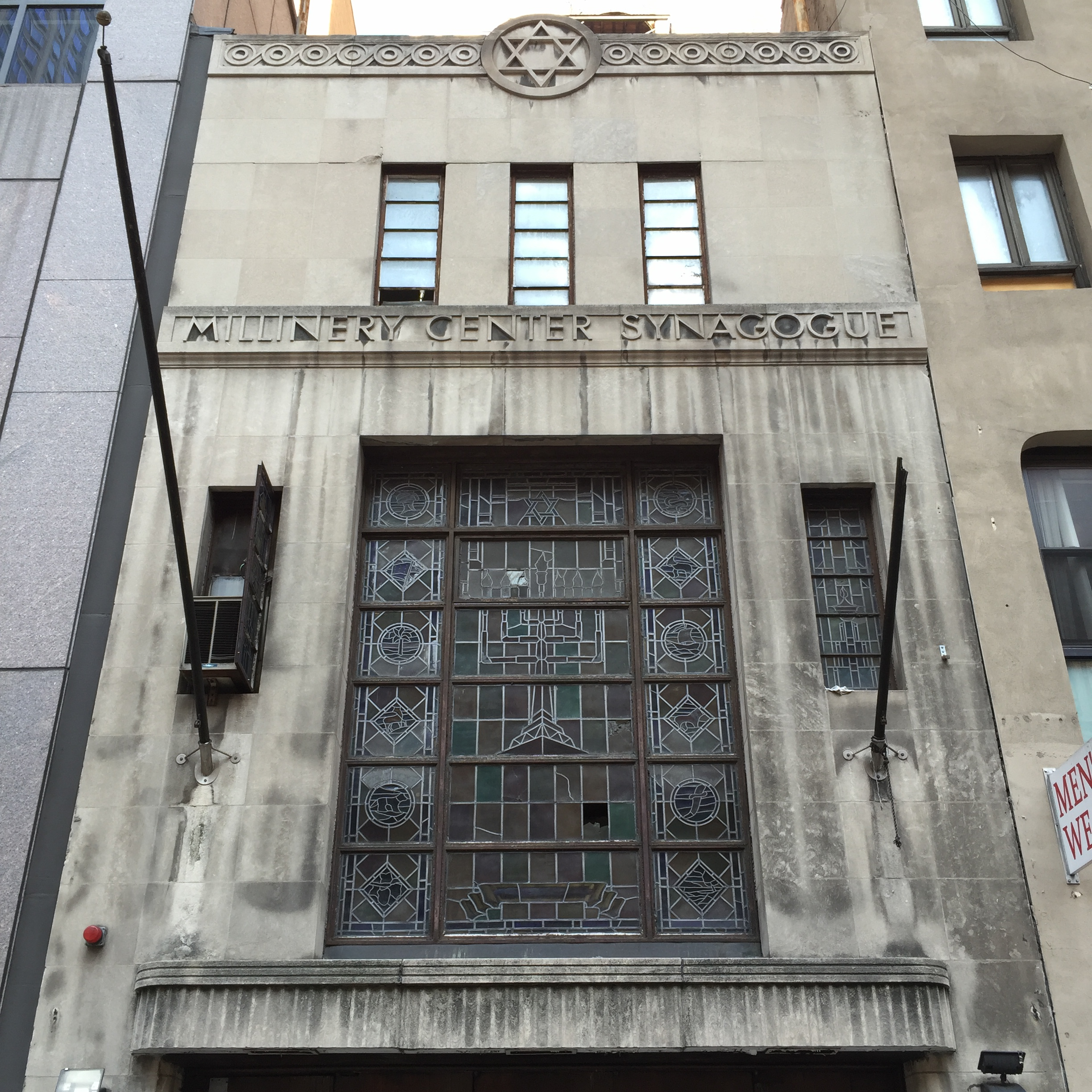
Millinery Center Synagogue façade

The limestone building itself is narrow, approximately 19 feet (5.8 m) wide by 60 feet (18 m) deep, and cost $150,000 to build. It was notable for having air conditioning.

== Current ==
On May 3, 2017, the Board of Trustees of Millinery Center Synagogue nominated Rabbi Avrohom Dov Kahn to serve as rabbi. On May 10, 2017 Rabbi Kahn was elected in a landslide. It was the first election of a rabbi of the synagogue in over two decades.

A week later on May 17, Rabbi Kahn was formally installed as rabbi in a program featuring three young professionals who spoke about the important impact the synagogue and Rabbi Kahn had made on them. Harav Doniel Lander, Rosh Hayeshiva of Yeshivas Ohr Hachaim, spoke movingly of his decades-long close friendship with Rabbi Kahn and those attributes that made Rabbi Kahn eminently qualified to lead the synagogue in its rejuvenation and renewal efforts. Rabbi Kahn concluded the program by outlining what he hoped to do for the synagogue and how he hoped to guide MCS to reach out and benefit Jews throughout all of midtown Manhattan."

== Clergy ==
The following individuals have served as rabbi for the congregation:

Order	Rabbi	Term started	Term ended	Time in office	Notes
1	Moshe Ralbag				
2	Morris Gordon				
3	Dr. Alexander J. Burnstein	1942	1970	27–28 years	
4	Abraham Berger	1980	1985	4–5 years	
5	David Friedberg	1985	1990	4–5 years	
6	Leonard Guttman	1990	1992	1–2 years	
7	Hayim S. Wahrman	1992	2016	23–24 years	
8	Avrohom Dov Kahn	2017	incumbent	8–9 years	
