= Wolf Gold =

Israeli rabbi and independence activist (1889-1956)

- זאב גולד
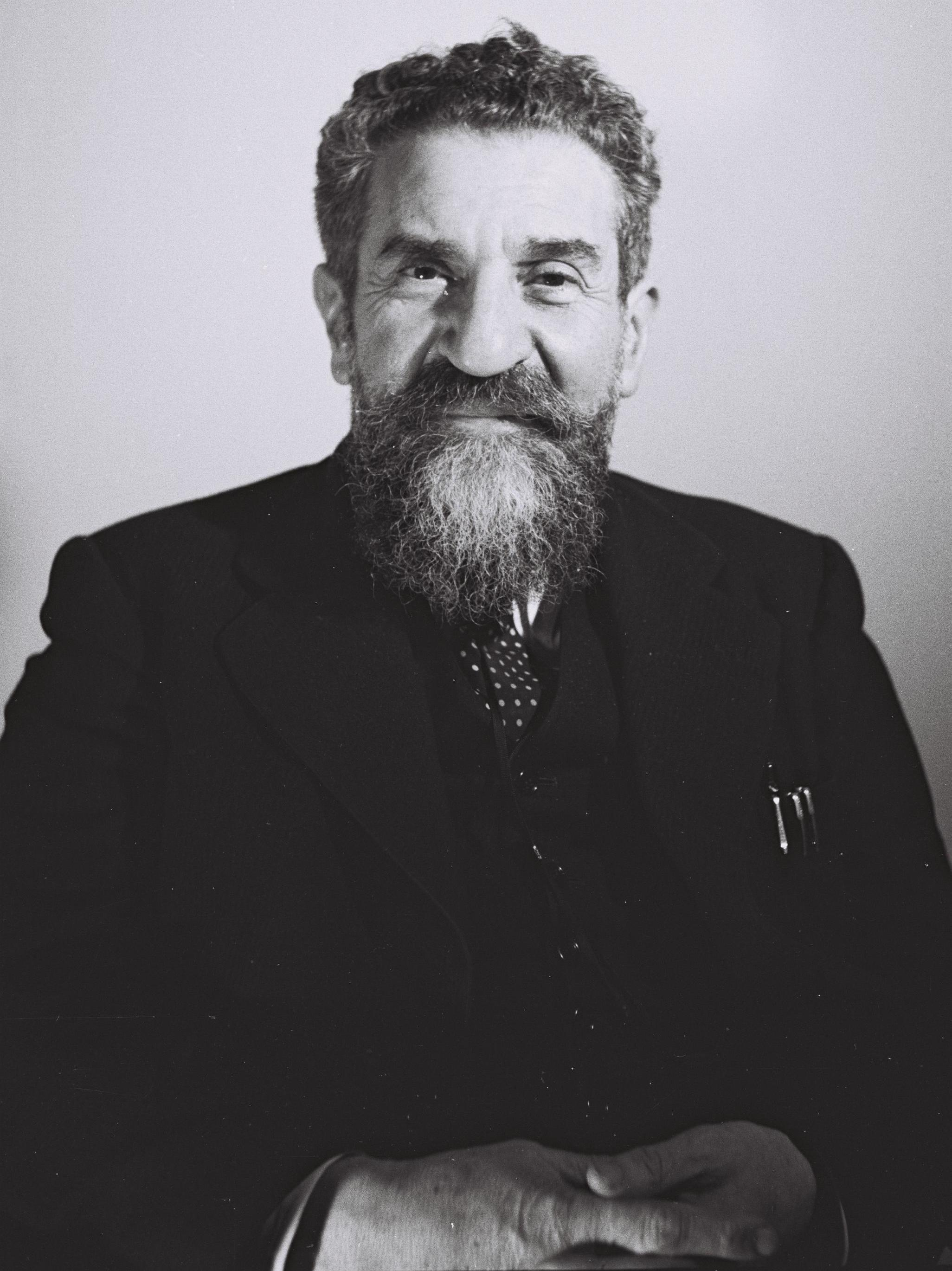
- Gold in 1948
- Born: 2 May 1889; Szczuczyn, Congress Poland
- Died: 8 April 1956 (aged 66); Jerusalem
- Political party: Mizrachi

Rabbi Wolf Gold (Hebrew: זאב גולד; Ze'ev Gold, born Zev Krawczynski on May 2, 1889, died 8 April 1956) was a rabbi, Jewish activist, and one of the signers of the Israeli declaration of independence.

== Biography ==
Wolf was born on 2 May 1889 in the Polish town of Szczuczyn. he was a descendant on his father's side from at least eight generations of rabbis. Gold's first teacher was his maternal grandfather, Rabbi Yehoshuah Goldwasser - a leader in Hovevei Zion. Later he studied at the Mir yeshiva under Rabbi Eliyahu Baruch Kamei. After that he studied in Lida at Yeshiva Torah Vo'Da'as, the yeshiva of Rabbi Yitzchak Yaacov Reines where Torah study was combined with secular studies. Gold was ordained as a rabbi at the age of 17 by Rabbi Eliezer Rabinowitz of Minsk, and succeeded his father-in-law, Rabbi Moshe Reichler, as rabbi in Juteka.

At the age of 18 he moved to the United States, where he served as rabbi in several communities including South Chicago, Scranton, Pennsylvania (until 1912), Congregation Beth Jacob Ohev Sholom in Williamsburg, Brooklyn (1912–1919), San Francisco (until 1924) and Congregation Shomrei Emunah of Borough Park, Brooklyn (1928-1935).

He was a pioneer in establishing Orthodox Judaism in the United States. He founded the Williamsburg Talmud Torah, and in 1917 founded Yeshiva Torah Vodaas. He started the Beth Moshe hospital in Bushwick, Brooklyn in 1920. In 1947 Beth Moses merged with Israel Zion Hospital to become Maimonides Hospital) and an orphanage in Brooklyn and also founded a Hebrew teachers training college in San Francisco.

In 1914, Rabbi Gold invited Rabbi Meir Berlin, secretary of the World Mizrachi, to come to New York to organize a branch of Mizrachi in the United States. For the next 40 years, Gold traveled in the United States and Canada organizing chapters of the Mizrachi movement and became president of American Mizrachi in 1932.

In 1935, he emigrated to Palestine, where he became the head of the Department of Torah Education and Culture in the Diaspora and worked to establish new educational institutions within the Diaspora, especially for North African Jews.

During World War II, he was involved in the widespread Zionist opposition to the British White Paper of 1939 and worked to rescue European Jewry from the Holocaust. In 1943, he traveled to the United States where he participated as a speaker on behalf of European Jewry at the Rabbis' march in Washington.

He was a member of the Jewish Agency Executive, heading the Department for Jerusalem Development. In 1946, he was a member of the Jewish Delegation to the United Nations General Assembly.

He served as Vice-President of the Provisional State Council and went on to sign the Israeli declaration of independence in 1948. He served on the founding committee of Bar-Ilan University.

On 8 April 1956, Gold died of heart disease at Hadassah Medical Center in Jerusalem, and was buried near his lifelong friend Rabbi Meir Bar-Ilan. He had at the time of his death three daughters and a son. Two years after his death, a Jewish woman's teacher training seminary was established in the city and named after him; Machon Gold.

His grandson, Rabbi Yaakov Katz, is a Rosh Yeshiva (dean) at Yeshivat Netiv Aryeh.

== See also ==
- Zev Wolf (disambiguation page)
