= Alvin Kass =

American rabbi (1935–2025)

Personal life
- Born: December 23, 1935 Paterson, New Jersey, U.S.
- Died: October 29, 2025 (aged 89) Manhattan, New York, U.S.
- Spouse: Miryom Arnold (m. 1963–2017)
- Children: 3

Religious life
- Religion: Judaism
- Position: Chief chaplain
- Organization: New York City Police Department

Alvin Kass (December 23, 1935 – October 29, 2025) was an American rabbi. He was the chief chaplain of the New York City Police Department. He joined the department in 1966 at the age of 30, becoming the youngest chaplain in the department's history. He served until his death.

== Early life ==
Kass was born in Paterson, New Jersey, on December 23, 1935, to Joseph Kass and Ida (née Abramowitz) Kass; Joseph worked as a furniture salesman. Alvin attended Eastside High School, and was awarded a bachelor's degree at Columbia College, Columbia University in 1957, having studied American history and political science. He had been accepted to Harvard Law School, but left, a few weeks before classes started, to go to the Jewish Theological Seminary (JTS), a Conservative Jewish seminary in New York, after having decided that he would rather "minister to people’s spiritual needs rather than legal ones". He graduated from JTS in 1962 and received his semikhah. He also had a master's degree from Columbia, a PhD from New York University, as well as a D. Div from JTS.

== Chaplaincy ==
Kass was a chaplain for the United States Air Force and became the rabbi of Astoria Center of Israel, a small congregation in Astoria, Queens, New York in 1964. He led the Queens congregation until 1978, when he moved to the East Midwood Jewish Center, one of New York City's largest Conservative Jewish synagogues, in Brooklyn.

In December 1966, four years after he became a rabbi, Kass was appointed a chaplain for the New York City Police Department (NYPD) at the age of 31 by Police Chief Howard R. Leary, to work alongside the department's five Christian chaplains. He was the youngest chaplain in the department's history. He was inspired to work for the city after the election of John Lindsay in 1965. He later discovered that he had been one of more than 30 rabbis interviewed to fill the vacant position of NYPD chaplain, and said that he had gotten the job based on his experience with the Air Force and after telling the NYPD brass that as chaplain he would have to be sure to answer to a higher authority, by which he made clear he meant the "Almighty Commissioner". Chief of Detectives Albert Seedman thought that the fact that the rabbi had brought handball gear with him to the interview showed that he would be a good match for the department.

In 1978, he persuaded a man not to jump from the World Trade Center. He helped negotiate the end to a 1984 hostage crisis in the Diamond District by buying two pastrami sandwiches from the Carnegie Deli that he traded for the gunman's pistol. In a 1996 interview, Kass cited his success in getting Sabbath observant NYPD officers the opportunity to take Saturdays off, noting that police officers in Jerusalem don't get the same benefit.

In 2002, he became the chief chaplain of the New York City Police Department. On December 16, 2016, the NYPD held a ceremony marking Kass's 50 years of service. He was awarded a third gold star, becoming the first three-star chaplain in the history of New York City. At the time of his death in 2025, Kass was the longest-serving chaplain in NYPD history.

== Personal life and death ==
In 1963, he married Miryom Sue Arnold of St. Paul, Minnesota, who worked as a teacher. Together they had three children. Miryom died in 2017.

Kass died on October 29, 2025, at the age of 89, at a hospital in Manhattan. He was buried at Cedar Park Cemetery in Paramus, New Jersey.
