= Rabbis' march (1943) =

1943 demonstration in Washington, D.C., United States

The Rabbis' March was a demonstration in support of American and allied action to stop the destruction of European Jewry. It took place in Washington, D.C., on October 6, 1943, three days before Yom Kippur. It was organized by Hillel Kook, nephew of the chief rabbi of Mandatory Palestine and head of the Bergson Group, and involved more than 400 rabbis, mostly members of the Union of Orthodox Rabbis of the United States and Canada, from New York and cities throughout the Eastern United States. It was the only such protest in Washington during the Holocaust.

The rabbis were received at steps of the Capitol by the Senate majority and minority leaders, and the Speaker of the House. After prayers for the war effort at the Lincoln Memorial the rabbis marched to the White House to plead with President Franklin D. Roosevelt. They were informed that the President was busy all day and were instead received by Vice President Henry Wallace. It was later learned that Roosevelt had several free hours that afternoon, but had avoided meeting the delegation out of concern regarding diplomatic neutrality and on the advice of some of his Jewish aides and several prominent American Jews, many of whom thought the protest would stir up anti-Semitism. Both Stephen Wise (head of the World Jewish Congress) and Samuel Rosenman (the President's advisor, speech writer and head of the American Jewish Committee) claimed that the protesting rabbis, many of whom were both Orthodox as well as recent immigrants (or first-generation Americans), "were not representative of American Jewry" and not the kind of Jews he should meet. In the November 1943 issue of his journal Opinion, Wise referred to the march as a "painful and even lamentable exhibition", calling it "propaganda by stunts" and accused the rabbis of offending the dignity of the Jewish people. Disappointed and angered by the President's failure to meet with them, the rabbis stood in front of the White House where they were met by Senator William Warren Barbour and others, and refused to read their petition aloud, instead handing it off to the Presidential secretary, Marvin McIntyre.

The march garnered much media attention, much of it focused on what was seen as the cold and insulting dismissal of many important community leaders, as well as the people in Europe they were fighting for. The headline in the Washington Times Herald read: "Rabbis Report 'Cold Welcome' at the White House." Editors of The Jewish Daily Forward commented, "Would a similar delegation of 500 Catholic priests have been thus treated?"

== Participants ==
Participating rabbis included the leading rabbinical figures of the era, including Rabbi Eliezer Silver and Rabbi Avraham Kalmanowitz of the Vaad Hatzalah. One of the participants was Rabbi Moshe Feinstein who would become one of the most important and famous American Orthodox rabbis and Rabbi Eliezer Poupko, a prominent figure in the orthodox rabbinic world. Rabbi Wolf Gold was also a participant and spoke at the protest.

== Gallery ==
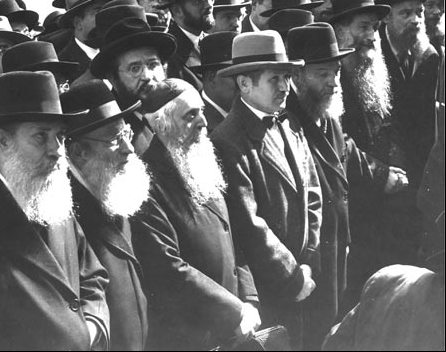
1943, Hundreds of Rabbis March on Washington

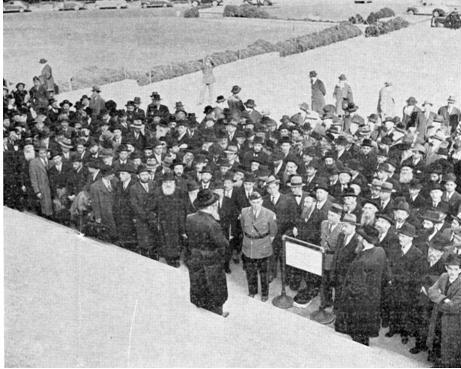
1943, Hundreds of Rabbis March on Washington

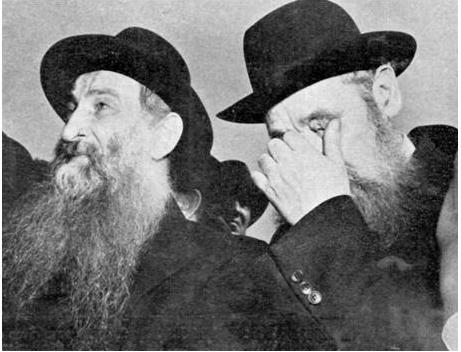
1943, Rabbis crying at the March on Washington

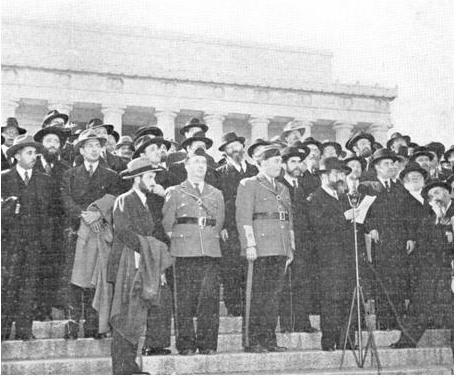
1943, Hundreds of Rabbis at the steps during the March on Washington

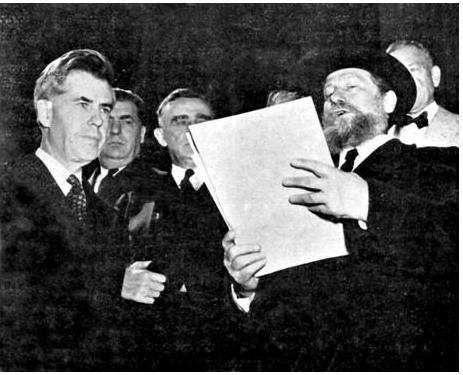
1943, Hundreds of Rabbis March on Washington

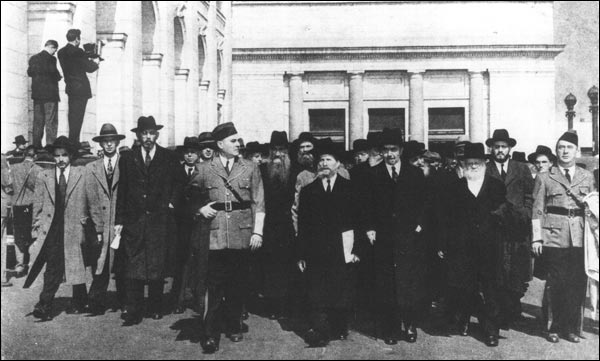
1943, Hundreds of Rabbis March on Washington, David S. Wyman Institute for Holocaust Studies

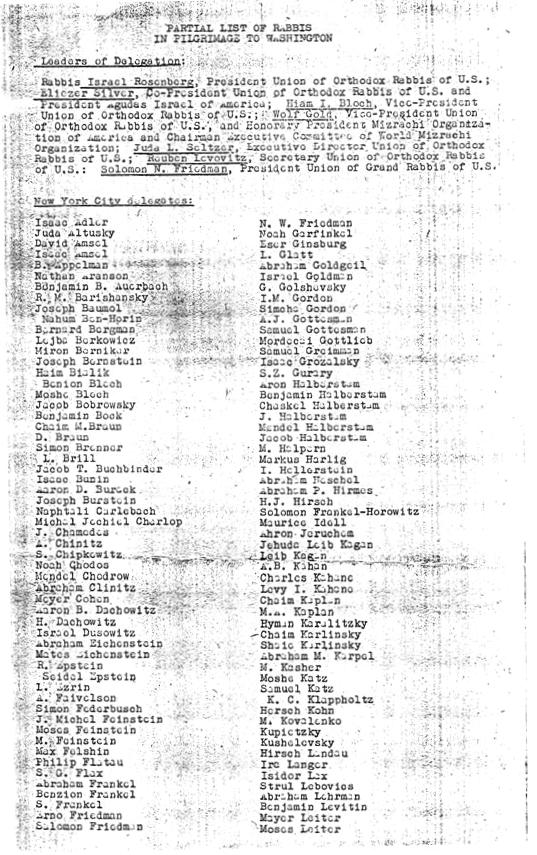
1943, Names of Hundreds of Rabbis March on Washington, page 1

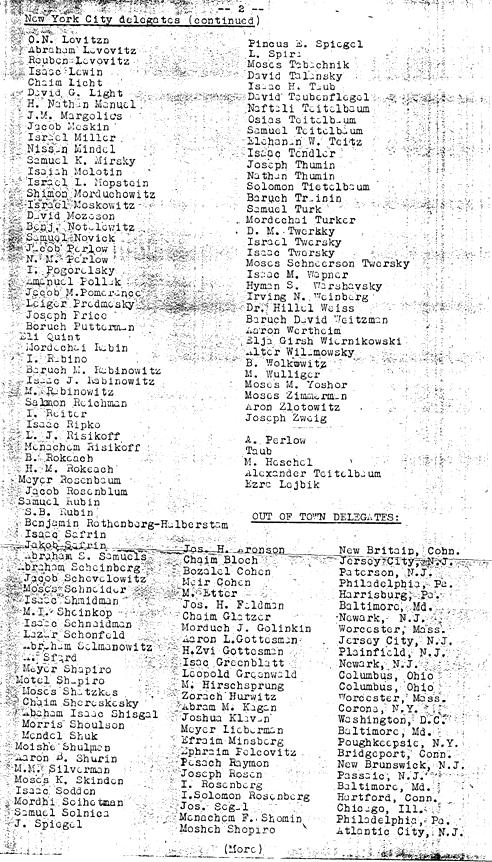
1943, Names of Hundreds of Rabbis March on Washington, page 2

== Holocaust museum petitions ==
On 29 July 2007, relatives of the rabbis who marched on Washington sent a letter to the United States Holocaust Memorial Museum, urging the inclusion of information about the Bergson Group and the Rabbi's March in the museum's permanent exhibit. A similar petition, signed by 100 public figures, was delivered to Yad Vashem.

== Sources ==
- David S. Wyman Institute for Holocaust Studies. The Day the Rabbis Marched
- Jewish Virtual Library. When the Rabbis Marched on Washington
