= Harry Halpern =

American rabbi (1899–1981)

Rabbi Harry Halpern
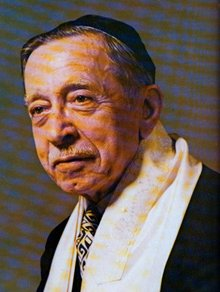

Personal life
- Born: February 4, 1899 New York City
- Died: June 10, 1981 (aged 82) Southbury, Connecticut

Religious life
- Religion: Judaism
- Ordination: Jewish Theological Seminary of America, 1929

Jewish leader
- Previous post: East Midwood Jewish Center

Harry Halpern (February 4, 1899 – June 10, 1981) was an American Conservative Jewish educator and rabbi who for almost 49 years was the rabbi of the East Midwood Jewish Center (EMJC), in Brooklyn, New York.

== Life and works ==
Halpern was born on the Lower East Side of Manhattan, attending Brooklyn's Public School (PS) 37 and Eastern District High School. He received his bachelor's degree in philosophy from the City College of New York in 1919 and a master's degree from Columbia University in 1925. He also received both a bachelor and doctoral degree from Brooklyn Law School, studied at the Rabbi Isaac Elchanan Theological Seminary, and earned ordination as a rabbi from the Jewish Theological Seminary of America (JTS), in 1929. He later received a Doctor of Hebrew Literature degree from JTS in 1951.

Halpern served as the first "pupil rabbi" for the Talmud Torah "junior congregation" of Congregation Beth Jacob Ohev Sholom in Long Island, New York. He also served for a short time as the "student preacher and spiritual leader" of the Jewish Communal Center of Brooklyn, before taking the position of rabbi for the East Midwood Jewish Center in 1929, where he served for almost 49 years. At the EMJC, his sermons constantly educated, challenged and inspired the congregation both in terms of Jewish identity and larger social concerns such as the rights of minorities, and he "pleaded for intensive Jewish Education of the Day School-Yeshiva type long before private schools became fashionable. He retired from the EMJC in 1977 to live in Southbury, Connecticut until his death four years later, in 1981.

A leader in both the general Jewish community and numerous major rabbinic groups, he served as president of both the Rabbinical Assembly, the organization of conservative rabbis, and the New York Board of Rabbis, and Chairman of the JTS Rabbinic Cabinet, advising the seminary chancellor on issues important to the Jewish people. He was also Chairman of the Rabbinical Assembly Social Actions Commission, visiting professor of homiletics at JTS, and adjunct professor of pastoral psychiatry at JTS. In addition to his work at JTS, he served as chairman of the board of the Yeshiva of Flatbush.

During his tenure as president of the Rabbinical Assembly, a number of major changes and new institutions for the conservative movement were introduced, often in conjunction with the Jewish Theological Seminary, reaffirming those two organizations as the leadership groups for the movement. These included the Joint Bet Din(rabbinical court) of the Conservative Movement and the "Joint Conference on Jewish Law."

Halpern was a leader in many organizations and philanthropic affairs, including service as a member of the New York City Human Rights Commission (1967–1978), and the Kings County Commission Against Discrimination, and on the executive committees of the Brooklyn Red Cross and the Brooklyn Cancer Society. He also served on the executive committee of the New York Division of the National Conference of Christians and Jews. He opposed the use of taxes to support private schools (including religious schools) during his chairmanship of the Social Actions Commission of Conservative Judaism, also speaking out against the idea as President of the New York Board of Rabbis. The Board of Rabbis resolution was especially opposed to the idea of public funding of private religious schools, calling such action a "violation of our understanding of the hallowed principle of church-state separation."

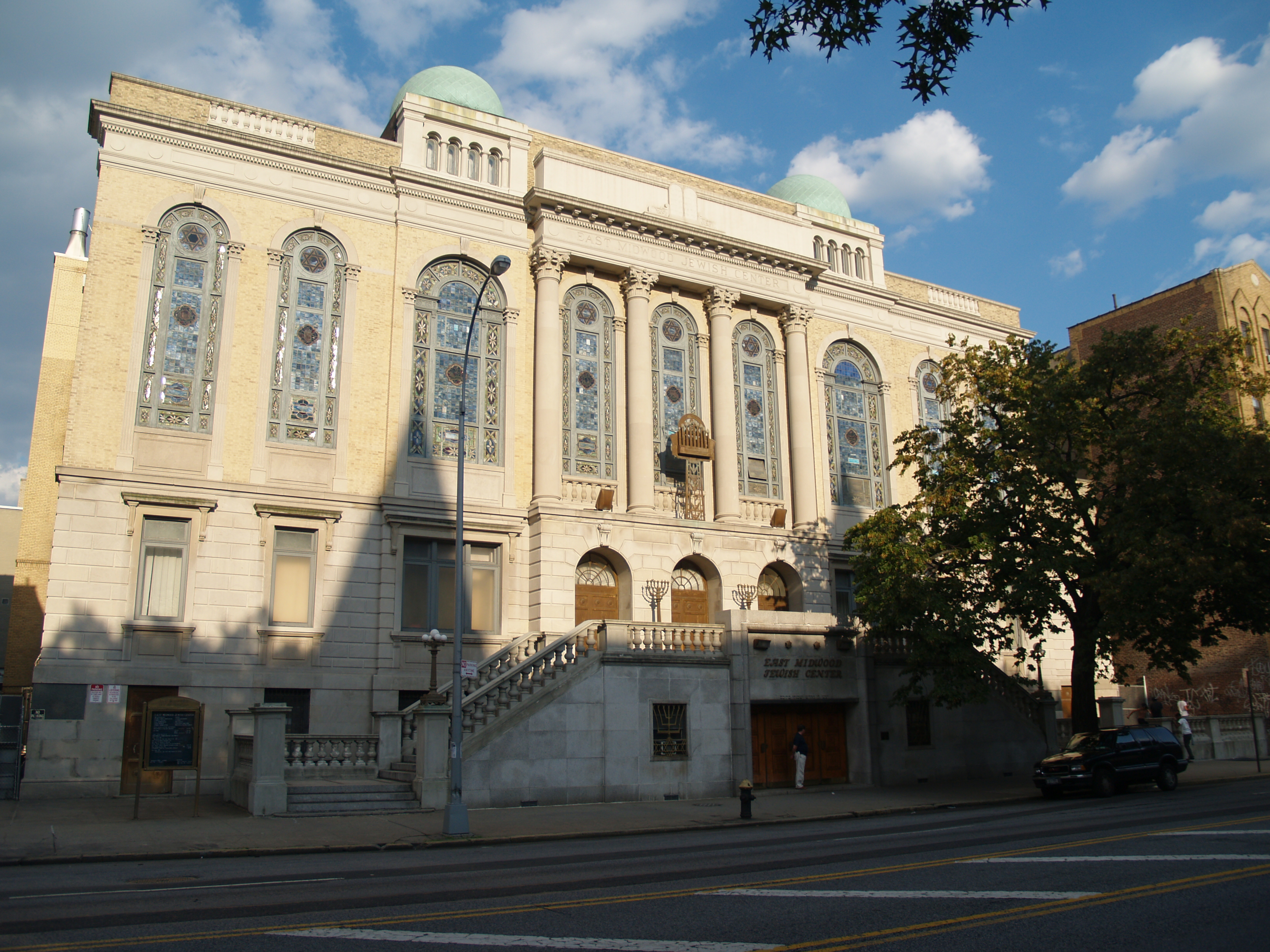
East Midwood Jewish Center

As one of his colleagues wrote upon the occasion of Halpern's death, "There was hardly a National Jewish Conference where Harry Halpern had not delivered the keynote address or one of the major speeches." Halpern's sermons, lectures, and addresses, in and out of the synagog, were "challenging, demanding, and even disturbing ... Rabbi Halpern preached social justice and human rights when those values were still associated with Hosea, Amos, and Isaiah."

Halpern was well respected by civic leaders for his actions, and sought out for his advice. In 1968, when a Brooklyn Jewish School was attacked by youths with rocks and molotov cocktails on the night of Halloween, New York Mayor John Lindsay visited the site the next day, also visiting other Jewish schools, he stopped to pick up Halpern and have lunch with him in between the school visits.

Halpern was a frequent speaker for organizations whose causes he supported, such as the November 1960 benefit for Brooklyn's "Pride of Judea Children's Services," an organization supporting the needs of orphaned, needy, and emotionally disturbed children. He also saw his leadership positions in rabbinic organizations as opportunities to highlight needs and support ministry to those in need, as evidenced by the special conference he convened on prison ministry during his tenure as Chairman of the New York Board of Rabbis chaplaincy program.

Halpern was an ardent Zionist, supporting the rights and needs of the Jewish community in pre-Israel Palestine, and later in the newly established State of Israel, but was also a strong proponent of solving problems through peaceful means. For example, at the annual meeting of the Rabbinical Assembly, where he was re-elected president of the group, a resolution was passed under his leadership, praising President Dwight D. Eisenhower's stand for peace. The resolution read, "We commend the President for the restraining influence he has exercised upon those in our country who would resolve the present international impasse by a resort to arms. We pray that he may be granted wisdom from on High to lead our country into the path of a lasting peace."

Well known as an orator, his sermons were often quoted in the press. A 1961 article in The New York Times quoted his explanation of the message of the festival of Shavuot for Jews, both in terms of their religion and their responsibilities as Americans: "Shavuot conveys two crucial messages to the world today. It stresses the role of the law in society and its binding validity on the conduct of our individual and national life, and it cautions us against yielding to discouragement because of initial failure." Similarly, his words about the meaning of Purim, linking it to the meaning of the right to be different within a democracy, were also quoted by the Times: "True religious freedom in a democratic society means not only the acceptance of the legitimacy of differences, but it regards the diversity of culture and religions as a source of enrichment and ennoblement."

Halpern was married to the former Mollie Singer until her death, later marrying his second wife, Jean Rosenhaus. He had one daughter with Mollie, Debbie Halpern Silverman, and one granddaughter, Meredith Silverman Fontecchio. He had three brothers: Rabbi Peretz (Pete) Halpern of Marblehead, Massachusetts, Isadore (Izzy) Halpern, a trial lawyer of note in Brooklyn, New York, and Louis Halpern who worked in insurance in New York.

== Views ==
A keen observer of religious life in America, he once summed up the inconsistencies of Judaism in America by describing a sign he had seen on a store window: "Closed Thursday and Friday for Rosh Hashanah – open Saturday."

A passionate speaker, Halpern was also a staunch advocate of civility in both private and public discourse. In 1968, when then New York Mayor John Lindsay was "booed and jeered" during a synagog meeting on school decentralization in New York City, Halpern took the microphone to challenge the conduct of the congregation: "I say this with a great deal of sadness in my heart. As Jews, you have no right to be in this synagogue acting the way you are acting," he said, continuing:

This is the spot on which for close to 40 years I preached to my people to be respectful and understanding. Is this the exemplification of the Jewish faith? I understand rebellion: Jews were leaders in every revolution all over the world. But there is one thing about being rebellious and being a dissenter. One can be a rebel with good manners and that is all I'm asking you.

=== Civil rights ===
A strong supporter of equal rights, he opened the 56th annual convention of the Rabbinical Assembly during his time as president of the organization, by calling for more involvement on the part of all rabbis in the fight for civil rights for "negroes" in America. Praising the dignity, the restraint, and the "truly religious spirit" of African Americans (using the term "Negro," current at that time) to fight for the constitutional rights guaranteed to them in the constitution and reaffirmed by the Supreme Court, his words became an important force in later rabbinic support of this cause:

We recognize the social and economic problems which are faced by our colleagues and their members in the heated atmosphere of bigotry. We can understand that there can be a difference of opinion concerning the method of achieving the desired result and the pace at which it should proceed, but we feel that no one can be true to the principles of the faith he professes unless he ranges himself on the side of those who are struggling for liberation from the Pharaohs of the twentieth century.

=== Support for Israel ===
A strong Zionist, Halpern was elected president of the Brooklyn region of the Zionist Organization of America in 1944. He was a fervent spokesman for Israel, sharply criticizing Jewish organizations which lacked the courage (in his words) to take a stand for the new State of Israel. For example, referring to the American Council for Judaism, he called them "terrified Jews who are attempting to convince the American people that a love for Israel is tantamount to disloyalty to our country." Disagreeing with such a stand, he proclaimed that "all Americans who understand the true meaning of American democracy have seen no division of American loyalty in American Jewry's sympathy with and whole-hearted support of those heroic people who make up the population of Israel." Halpern also criticized the American State Department for its lack of sufficient support, publicly calling on the United States to send "defensive weapons" to Israel "to thwart Communist aggression and design in the area."

On June 3, 1946, Halpern, in his position as head of the Brooklyn division of the Zionist Organization of America, presided over a rally "to mobilize Jews to support the Zionist program. Halpern declared that the rally would voice "the common determination of Brooklyn Zionists to fight the [British] delaying tactics now being pursued to block the granting of 100,000 certificates of immigration, recommended by the Anglo-American Committee on Palestine."

In 1948, when Dr. Chaim Yassky, the director of the Hadassah Medical Organization in Palestine, was slain in an attack by Arabs, Halpern spoke at a meeting of more than 1500 Hadassah members in Brooklyn, calling on the group to observe a moment of silence in memory of Dr. Yassky, other doctors, nurses and laboratory assistants working for the cause of medicine in Palestine. The New York Times reported that many of the participants in the meeting openly wept, and that Halpern's words added to the "emotional intensity" of the group.

Halpern continued to support Israel throughout his life, and in 1951 served as the Honorary Chairman for Brooklyn Israel Bond dinners as part of a national effort to raise $500,000,000 in Israel Bonds. Chairing a 1959 dinner to honor departing Israeli Ambassador Abba Eban, Halpern called for a greater awareness of Hebrew language and culture "to achieve a closer relationship between Israeli and American Jews."

=== Family strength ===
Halpern gained notoriety for his 1957 sermon that declared that "the American father is a moron," speaking on the need for stronger parental leadership in American families to ward off the "dire consequences" we would face without it.

In the sermon, reprinted in The New York Times, Halpern went on to clarify that the image of the modern father as a "moron" came from "television and comics," while the same media portrayed fathers in earlier times as tyrants. His sermon continued:

Aside from being a moron, the man spends half his life building a home and the other half getting out of and running away from it. As a result, today's families lack the definite spiritual and cultural links which only a responsible parent can provide. How can children mature and grow up into responsible citizens in such an environment? Today's youth should be fully equipped with the cultural heritage by the time it enters the higher educational institutions, yet how many parents fail to provide that heritage? Too many parents are under the false impression that it is in colleges that their children will acquire the characteristics they should have received at home.

During his tenure as Rabbinical Assembly president, Halpern represented that organization in a joint announcement by the RA and the Jewish Theological Seminary, that a revision in the traditional Jewish marriage document, the ketubah, would require Jewish couples to consult with a newly established conservative "Bet Din" (rabbinical court) before a divorce. Halpern noted that part of the reason behind the change was to protect Jewish women from "unscrupulous" men, who would abuse them (and Jewish law) by granting a civil divorce without a religious divorce ("Get") – a situation that would prevent religious Jewish women from being able to remarry, but that the change would also help support marriages, through the opportunity to seek marital counseling "to heal marital rifts and to ward off hasty divorce actions."

Halpern often spoke out about the importance of human relationships, among family members, colleagues, and friends. In 1956, at the annual gathering of the Rabbinical Assembly, he said, "I know this, that all religion and all life comes down to this – to the effort of the human soul to break through the barriers of loneliness and to make some contact with another seeking soul or to that which all souls seek, namely, God. Therefore, I think we can dedicate ourselves and devote ourselves to assisting and aiding and comforting one another."

=== Religion in public schools ===
During heated 1950s debates on the subject of religion in the public school, Halpern spoke out as President of the Rabbinical Assembly in opposition to the idea. After a presentation to members of the group by Rabbi Morris Adler of Detroit, Michigan, in which Adler took a strong stand against "any religious intrusions upon public education," Halpern personally supported this position, adding that it was a "long-established policy" of the organization.

Halpern continued his opposition to religion in public schools through the 1960s, publicly supporting the Supreme Court ban on prayer in public schools.

=== Faith and hope ===
Throughout his career, Halpern was known for his ability to identify and confront problems – but to fight the tendency to despair, preaching the need to keep faith, and keep hope, even in humanity itself.

Among his most notable sermons, quoted in The New York Times, was his call to look at leaders and heroes from all religions and cultures—individuals like Jesus, Confucius, Gandhi, and Albert Schweitzer—as a means to keep faith in humanity itself: "There is too much a tendency in our day to condemn humanity, or large sections of it. We condemn all nations or groups of citizens within nations. But, like Abraham of old, we must plead for sinful cities with the thought that every group, every city, every nation does contain some righteous people. It is for these righteous people, if for no one else, that the world is worth saving."

His talks often focused on the challenge of looking ahead, not back, linking the ideas of courage and faith:

I love to play with words and look at them closely. I wonder if it has ever occurred to you to examine the word, life, l-i-f-e? In the middle of every life is an "if," i-f, and therefore a great many things can be. There is no point in thinking in terms of what might have been. One has to have faith, one has to have courage, and faith and courage go together, because you cannot have courage without faith. On the other hand, faith leads to courage.

== Honors and memorials ==
Honors Halpern received during his life and after his death include the renaming of the East Midwood Jewish Center educational center as the "Rabbi Harry Halpern Education Center" on March 17, 1995, and a 1947 gift of $50,000, raised by members of his synagog congregation and friends, to establish a fellowship in Talmudic study at the Jewish Theological Seminary in his honor. In 1948, the East Midwood Jewish Center sisterhood honored Halpern by asking him to present an ambulance on the group's behalf to the "American Red Mogen Dovid for Palestine, Inc." (precursor to the Red Magen David), which he called in his presentation remarks "the Red Cross of Israel."

In April 1954, the EMJC held a weekend-long celebration honoring Halpern's 25th year in the rabbinate and the center's 30th anniversary. Among those who paid tribute to Halpern were Abraham L. Sacher, president of Brandeis University," who spoke at a dinner in Halpern's honor, and Supreme Court Justice Maximilian Moss, who delivered a greeting at the Friday evening worship services that began the weekend program. Rabbi Simon Greenberg, Vice-chancellor of the Jewish Theological Seminary, officiated at the service.

Additionally, the East Midwood Jewish Center's school presents the annual Dvora Halpern Memorial Award, named in memory of Halpern's mother,

== Published works ==
- "From Where I stand" (collection of sermons, essays, and lectures), Ktav Publishing House, New York, 1974: ISBN 978-0-87068-263-6.
- "Bible Readings for the Young: Volume I," Behrman House, 1922.
