= Israel M. Goldman =

Israel M. Goldman (1904 - February 9, 1979) was an American Rabbi.

== Early life and move to Chizuk Amuno ==
Goldman was born in Poland and immigrated to the United States. He lived in New York for a time as he attended the Jewish Theological Seminary of America where he graduated in 1926. He immediately made his home in Providence, Rhode Island where he served as a Rabbi at Temple Immanuel until 1948, when he moved to Baltimore, MD. On November 14, 1948, Rabbi Goldman was installed as the 4th leader of Chizuk Amuno. From 1948 to 1976, Rabbi Goldman "established Chizuk Amuno’s first Adult Jewish Institute, Laymen’s Weekend Retreat, and Interfaith service." He was married to Mildred Goldman and had two daughters, Anna and Tobie.

== On discrimination ==
In 1948, the nation Israel was established in Palestine, and he stated that "the Jewish state signalizes the only good to come out of World War II." He said this because he believed that the USA had not overcome its racial bias thereby necessitating that Jews possess a home of their own. In 1953, he headed a research group that collected data regarding racial issues in Baltimore. The Committee of Self Survey, as the group was dubbed, revealed:

- Of the 100,000 people surveyed, 24% were black.
- 91% of "hotels restaurants, theaters, department stores, and other 'public accommodations,'" were guilty of some form of racial bias.
- 75% of church leaders polled were favorable to serving all the people as opposed to 10% who were not.
- 80% of blacks surveyed lived in 19% of the city's living space.
- 40% of black housing was substandard.

Rabbi Goldman participated in the civil rights movement to change this. In the summer of 1963, Rabbi Goldman was arrested at Gwynn Oak Park for protesting racial bans there. However, Rabbi Goldman's participation was not universally welcomed. In 1968 Rabbi Goldman lamented, "[h]ow ironic that the Jewish group that has stood in the forefront of action for the civil rights throughout the country, and throughout the years, should now be singled out by these extremist groups in their blind hatred for the white community." But Rabbi Goldman pointed out that the opposition to his participation was not shared by all as he acknowledged "that some Negroes, in their frustrations, have turned into the blind alley and self degrading path of antisemitism".

== Death ==
In 1976, Rabbi Goldman retired from the rabbinate. He had increased the membership of Chizuk Amuno from 420 families to 1200. He had also moved the worship center of the congregation, in the 1960s, from Eutaw Place to Stevenson Road just outside the city. On February 9, 1979, Rabbi Goldman died at 6 A.M.

== Works by Rabbi Goldman ==
Rabbi Goldman was also a published author. His works are:

Lifelong learning among Jews: adult education in Judaism from Biblical times to the twentieth century. International Standard Book Number: 9780870682919.

The life and times of Rabbi David Ibn Abi Zimra; a social, economic and cultural study of Jewish life in the Ottoman Empire in the 15th and 16th centuries as reflected in the Responsa of the RDBZ.
