= Congregation Shomrei Emunah (Borough Park) =

Orthodox synagogue in Brooklyn, New York

- Hebrew: קהל שומרי אמונה
- Location in New York City

Religion
- Affiliation: Orthodox Judaism
- Ecclesiastical or organisational status: Synagogue
- Leadership: Rabbi Aviezer Cohen
- Status: Active

Location
- Location: 5202 14th Avenue, Borough Park, Brooklyn, New York City, New York 11219
- Country: United States
- Coordinates: 40°37′55″N 73°59′31″W

Architecture
- Type: Synagogue
- Style: Romanesque Revival
- Established: 1907 (as a congregation)
- Completed: 1910

Congregation Shomrei Emunah (Hebrew: קהל שומרי אמונה) is an Orthodox Jewish synagogue located at 5202 14th Avenue, Borough Park, Brooklyn, in New York City, New York, United States.

Founded in 1907, the congregation moved into its present building in 1910. Its current rabbinical leader is Rabbi Aviezer Cohen. Its current chazzan (cantor) is Chazzan Adler. The chazzan sheini (secondary cantor) is Chazzan Nachman Schneider (who is currently the chief cantor at Congregation Beth Israel of Borough Park and cantor emeritus at Congregation Young Israel of Lawrence and Cedarhurst.)

== History ==
Congregation Shomrei Emunah was established in 1907 by a group that included a number of Torah scholars; publishing its by-laws on September 3, of that year. In the beginning, services were held in a Masonic hall at New Utrecht Avenue and 56th Street. In 1910 the congregation constructed its own building at the corner of 14th Avenue and 52nd Street. The yellow-brick building in Romanesque Revival style has a large skylight over the bimah.

The subsequent founding of Beth El, Congregation Anshei Sfard, and Bnai Yehuda drew membership from Shomrei Emunah, which has been called "The Mother of Jewish Institutions" in Borough Park. Congregation members also played a role in the establishment of the first day school in the neighborhood, the Yeshivas Etz Chaim, and the Israel Zion Hospital, now known as the Maimonides Medical Center. In the early years of the congregation, the Chofetz Chaim had advised Torah scholars traveling to America that they should turn to Shomrei Emunah upon their arrival. Rabbis who have addressed the congregation include Elchonon Wasserman, Abraham Isaac Kook, and Boruch Ber Leibowitz.

== Rabbis ==
The synagogue installed its first rabbi in 1926. From 1928 to 1935 the rabbi was Wolf Gold, a founder of the Williamsburg Talmud Torah and Mesivta Torah Vodaas. From 1935 through 1973, Dr. Harry I. Wohlberg, a professor of Bible and homiletic literature at Yeshiva University, was the rabbi. Wohlberg was the first rabbi to receive a lifetime contract from an American Orthodox synagogue. From 1973 through 2008, the rabbi was Yaakov Pollack. In 2008 Aviezer Cohen became the rabbi.

== Activities ==
The synagogue made a name for itself in the Borough Park community with its strong emphasis on Torah study. In 1918 it founded a Chevra Shas (Talmud study society) and afterwards introduced other study groups on Bible, Mishnah, Midrash, Ein Yaakov, Chayei Adam, and Rif. In 1935 it inaugurated a Chevra Mishnayas U’Gemilas Chesed, which combines group study of Mishnayos with the distribution of interest-free loans to individuals and organizations. The emphasis on Torah study made the synagogue popular among former yeshiva students and residents interested in continuing their study of Torah and halakha (Jewish law) on Shabbat and during their free time. It also made the synagogue a popular stopping-point for visiting European Torah scholars.

In response to news of the Kristallnacht pogrom in November 1938, Shomrei Emunah held a public gathering "where FDR was praised for his stance on behalf of Jews".

In 2009 the synagogue was targeted for an anti-Jewish protest by members of the Westboro Baptist Church, a hate group, (Note: For hate group descriptor, see: "Westboro Baptist Church". Anti-Defamation League. Archived from the original on July 7, 2010.; "Active U.S. Hate Groups (Kansas)". Southern Poverty Law Center.; Westcott, Kathryn (May 25, 2006). "Hate Group Targeted by Lawmakers". BBC News. Barre, Vermont.; Lane, Ray (June 14, 2009). "Anti-Gay Hate Group Targets Seattle Churches". Seattle Post-Intelligencer.; McLaughlin, Mike & Einhorn, Erin (September 27, 2009). "Kansas Hate Group Westboro Baptist Church Protest Brooklyn Synagogues". Daily News. New York.) led by Fred Phelps.
