= East Midwood Jewish Center =

Conservative synagogue in Brooklyn, New York

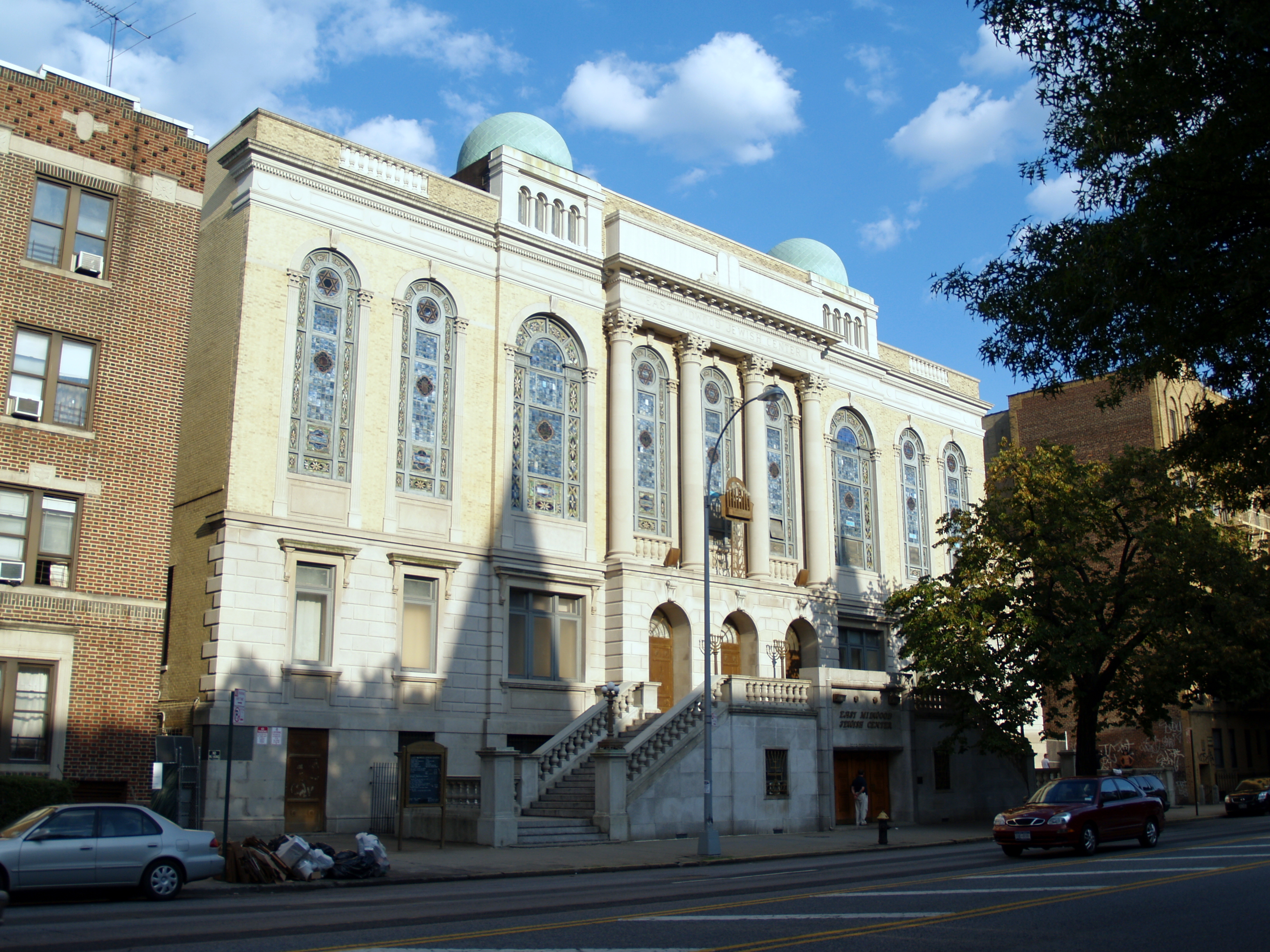
- East Midwood Jewish Center in Brooklyn, in 2008

- Location in Brooklyn, New York City

Religion
- Affiliation: Conservative Judaism
- Ecclesiastical or organisational status: Synagogue
- Leadership: Rabbi Matt Carl; Rabbi Alvin Cass (Emeritus); Cantor Sam Levines
- Status: Active

Location
- Location: 1625 Ocean Avenue, Midwood, Brooklyn, New York City, New York
- Country: United States
- Coordinates: 40°37′21″N 73°57′20″W

Architecture
- Architects: Irving Warshaw; Louis Allen Abramson; Maurice Courland
- Type: Synagogue
- Style: Renaissance Revival
- Established: 1924 (as a congregation)
- Groundbreaking: 1926
- Completed: 1929; 97 years ago
- Construction cost: $1 million (today $19 million)

Specifications
- Direction of façade: West
- Capacity: 800 (main floor); 150+ (balcony)
- Width: 155 feet (47 m)
- Dome: 2
- Materials: Steel frame, masonry, buff and red brick, limestone, copper domes

Website
- emjc.org
- East Midwood Jewish Center
- U.S. National Register of Historic Places
- New York State Register of Historic Places
- NRHP reference No.: 06000478
- NYSRHP No.: 04701.015477

Significant dates
- Added to NRHP: June 7, 2006
- Designated NYSRHP: April 20, 2006

The East Midwood Jewish Center is a Conservative synagogue located at 1625 Ocean Avenue, Midwood, Brooklyn, New York City, New York, United States.

Organized in 1924, the congregation's Renaissance revival building that was completed in 1929 typified the large multi-purpose synagogue centers being built at the time, and was from the 1990s until 2010 the only synagogue with a working swimming pool in Brooklyn. The building has been unmodified architecturally since its construction, and in 2006 was added to the National Register of Historic Places.

Membership dropped during the Great Depression, and the synagogue suffered financial hardship, but it recovered, and by 1941 had 1,100 member families. In 1950 the congregation built an adjoining school; at its peak its enrollment was almost 1,000. As neighborhood demographics changed in the late 20th century, and Brooklyn's Jewish population became more Orthodox, the East Midwood Jewish Center absorbed three other Conservative Brooklyn congregations.

The East Midwood Jewish Center had only three rabbis from its founding until 2014. Reuben Kaufman served from 1924 to 1929, Harry Halpern from 1929 to 1977 and Alvin Kass from 1976 to 2014. In 2014, Matt Carl became the rabbi.

== History ==
=== Founding ===
East Midwood was organized in 1924 by Jacob R. Schwartz, a dentist who was concerned that his two sons had no nearby Hebrew school which they could attend. From the start his intention had been to create a Conservative synagogue: Conservative Judaism was seen as a compromise between Orthodox and Reform, providing the familiar (and lengthy) Hebrew services of Orthodox Judaism, but, like Reform, adding some English prayers. East Midwood differed from earlier Ashkenazi synagogues in New York, as services were to be conducted in Hebrew and English only (not Hebrew and Yiddish), and the members were to come from immigrants from all over Europe, not just one city or region.

East Midwood held its first annual meeting on November 18, 1924 at the Jewish Communal Center of Flatbush (also known as the Flatbush Jewish Center), and there elected its first president, Pincus Weinberg. Weinberg, who was also chair of the Real Estate Committee, was the father of Sidney Weinberg, who rose from the job of assistant porter to head Goldman Sachs from 1930 to 1969. Prior to moving to Flatbush, Pincus Weinberg had been president of Congregation Baith Israel Anshei Emes.

East Midwood's first rabbi was Reuben Kaufman, and its first cantor was Jacob Schraeter. Kaufman, a Brooklyn native, had celebrated his bar mitzvah at Baith Israel Anshei Emes.

=== Building construction ===
The Real Estate Committee almost immediately purchased land located on Avenue L between East 26th and 27th Streets. Most members, however, felt a location on Ocean Avenue would be more desirable. Issues arose with developing the land on Avenue L, and in 1925 the Committee purchased the current location at 1625 Ocean Avenue in Midwood, Brooklyn. The cornerstone was laid in 1926, and, although not complete, the building was fully enclosed by the autumn, and High Holiday services were held there that year. The Center's Talmud Torah, which had been created in 1925 and held in a temporary structure, also moved into the new building.

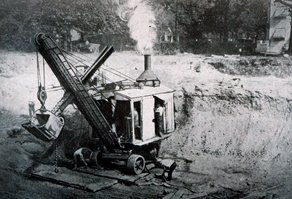
Groundbreaking, July 13, 1925.

Designed in the Renaissance revival style, the building was finally completed in 1929 at the cost of $1 million (today $18.8 million). It typified the new "synagogue-centers" being built at that time, combining the functions of both a synagogue and community center, and included "a synagogue, auditorium, kitchens, restaurant, classrooms, gymnasium, and swimming pool". That year Kaufman left the Center to become the rabbi of Temple Emanu-El in Paterson, New Jersey, and Harry Halpern became East Midwood's rabbi. Halpern, who also became an adjunct professor of pastoral psychiatry at the Jewish Theological Seminary of America (JTSA), would go on to serve as rabbi for 49 years, until his retirement in 1977, four years before his death in 1981.

=== Great Depression and mid-20th century ===
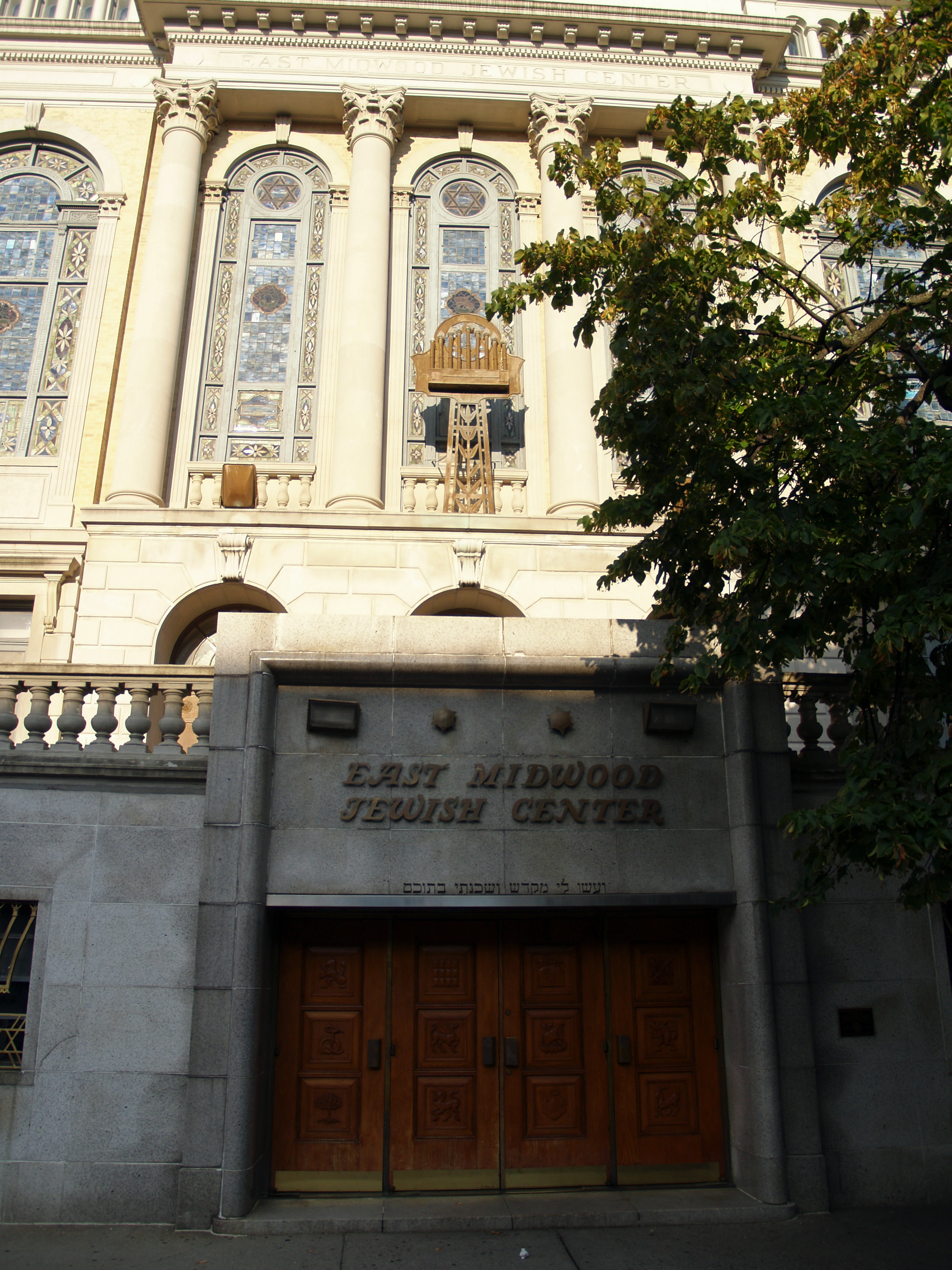
Street level doors

The Great Depression took its toll on the congregation, and membership dropped. In order to cope with the financial burdens, dues were raised, teachers were given endorsed notes rather than paychecks, the Executive Secretary was laid off, pews were sold, and individual members provided mortgage guarantees. The synagogue survived, and membership recovered; by 1934 there were 300 members, and by 1944 there were 1,100.

From 1955 to 1985, the famed Abraham Nadel was appointed Choral Director. Nadel was known for his outstanding Choir leadership & musicianship; Specifically for his composition of Sim Sholom. Joseph Eidelson [Jozef Ajdelson] became cantor in 1956. Born in Warsaw, Poland, Eidelson previously served as cantor at Warsaw's Sinai Synagogue, and in 1935 at the Great Synagogue of Vilna, Lithuania.

In October 1968, then Mayor of New York City John Lindsay was booed and jeered by a huge crowd at the East Midwood Jewish Center, in an infamous incident during the 1968 New York City teachers strike. Lindsay had supported a school decentralization plan that had pitted mostly black parents against mostly Jewish teachers and school administration; after the administrator of the Ocean Hill—Brownsville school board dismissed 13 teachers and 6 administrators (mostly Jewish) for opposing decentralization, the United Federation of Teachers "called a strike that closed 85 percent of the city's 900 schools for 55 days".

When Lindsay arrived he was met by a mob of 2,000 people outside the synagogue, who shouted "Lindsay must go" and "we want Shanker". Halpern admonished the protesters, asking "Is this the exemplification of the Jewish faith?", but many replied "yes". Lindsay was heckled off the podium by the audience inside, and his limousine was "pounded on" and "pelted with trash" by the mob outside (which had grown to 5,000) as he drove away. The strike, which was marked by "threats of violence and diatribes laced with racism and anti-Semitism", ended when the New York legislature suspended the administrator and the board.

Following Halpern's retirement in 1977, East Midwood hired as rabbi Alvin Kass, a graduate of Columbia College and the JTSA, with a Ph.D. in philosophy from New York University.

=== Late 20th and early 21st century ===
As Brooklyn's changing demographics made non-Orthodox institutions less viable, East Midwood absorbed three other congregations, including the Jewish Communal Center of Flatbush, where East Midwood had held its first annual meeting, and, in 1978, Flatbush's Congregation Shaare Torah. In 1996, membership was 1,000 families.

At that time the membership had become divided over the issue of role of women in the synagogue. Though some members left the congregation over this issue, by 2009 East Midwood had become fully egalitarian. According to then-Vice President Michael Sucher "Those individuals who championed depriving women of the rights to be full members of the congregation were overruled by a majority of members who wanted to have an egalitarian Conservative congregation".

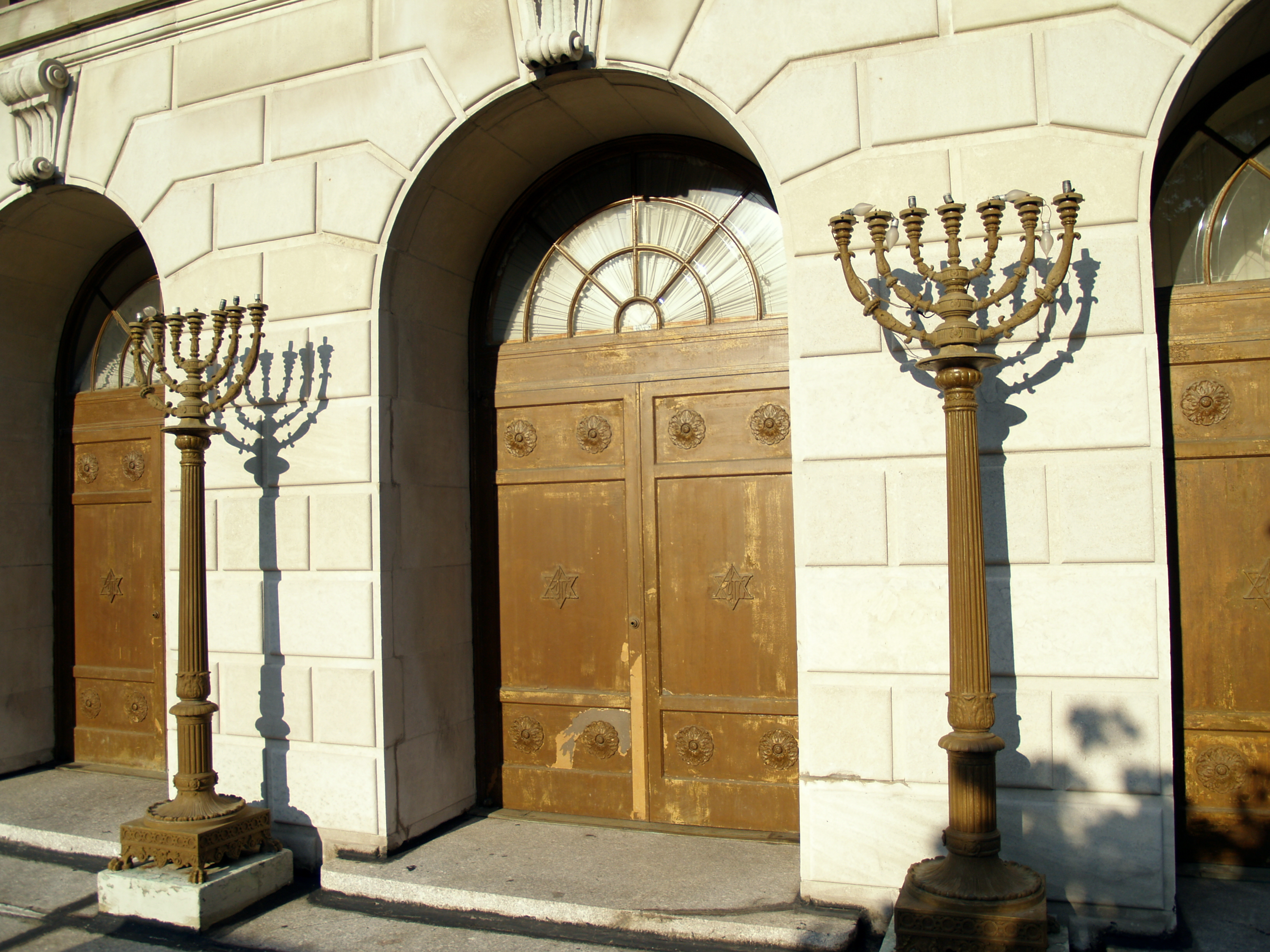
Upper level doors

The synagogue building has remained architecturally unchanged since its construction, and was from the 1990s until 2010 the only synagogue in Brooklyn with a functioning swimming pool. In June 2006, it was added to the NRHP. That year the congregation received a $300,000 loan from the New York Landmarks Conservancy for repairs for "masonry and steel repairs on the side and rear facades." It also raised $40,000 in order to receive a 2:1 "matching grant" of $20,000 from the Conservancy, and completed the repair work in 2007. In November 2007 East Midwood was awarded a $409,575 New York State Environmental Protection Fund grant to "restore features of the sanctuary including stained glass windows, stained glass dome and skylight."

Aaron Pomerantz joined as associate rabbi in 1978. Born in Poland, he had escaped Europe after the outbreak of World War II, moving to Canada and then the United States. There he graduated from Manhattan's Washington Irving High School, and in 1952 received his rabbinic ordination from Yeshiva Rabbi Chaim Berlin. From 1948 he had served as ritual director and then rabbi of Congregation Shaare Torah, joining the East Midwood Jewish Center when the two congregations merged. He served until his death in May 2009.

Joseph Eidelson retired to become Cantor Emeritus in 1995, 9 years before his death in 2004.

Sam Levene became East Midwood's cantor in 2004. Born in Jerusalem and raised in Toronto, Levene was a graduate of the H.L. Miller Cantorial School and the JTSA's cantorial program.

Kass retired to become Rabbi Emeritus in 2014. During his tenure Kass, also served as a New York City Police Department chaplain for over 40 years, and had previously served as a United States Air Force chaplain for two years. At one point during his service as Police Department chaplain he and his family received months of 24-hour security after death threats, and at another he defused a hostage situation by providing the hostage taker with sandwiches from the Carnegie Deli. Kass, who teaches ethics at the Police Academy, was instrumental in getting Jewish police officers time off to observe the Sabbath. He also convinced the NYPD Shomrim Society (the fraternal organization of Jewish members of the New York City Police Department) to admit David Durk. Durk, along with the more famous Frank Serpico, had been the source of the allegations of police corruption that led to the formation of the Knapp Commission.

Matt Carl joined as rabbi in 2014. A graduate of Vassar College and the JTSA, he had previously served as rabbi of Battery Park Synagogue in Manhattan and Congregation Mount Sinai in Brooklyn.

=== East Midwood Day School ===
East Midwood Jewish Center ran a successful Talmud Torah for after school Jewish instruction. As a child in the 1940s, feminist author Susan Brownmiller attended it two afternoons a week. In 1950, the congregation built a three-story school building and a two-story bridge link between the school and synagogue. At its peak in the early 1950s the school had an enrollment of almost 1,000.

East Midwood subsequently created a Conservative Jewish day school, serving students from kindergarten to Grade 8, and also providing "afternoon religious instruction for public school students through high school" operated separately from the Talmud Torah. Author and talk show host Dennis Prager taught at the day school. It was later renamed the Rabbi Harry Halpern Day School, in honor of Rabbi Halpern.

Like the synagogue, the day school also suffered from Brooklyn's changing (and increasingly Orthodox) demographics; enrollment had dropped from 400 students to 99 by the early 21st century. Invigorated by a new principal, enrollment climbed to 160 by 2008, but the school was still not financially stable. In addition, the day school had become more independent in the 1990s, and its relationship with the synagogue deteriorated to that of a tenant to a landlord. As a result, some of the synagogue's board members wanted to evict the school and find a new tenant. In 2009 the synagogue and the school signed a new agreement to bring the two organizations closer again, under which the synagogue would absorb some of the school's costs, and the parents of school children would become members of the synagogue. According to the synagogue's website, however, in 2018 the day school "reorganized itself, and modified into a more orthodox tradition". The Talmud Torah continued to operate as a congregational school.

== Architecture ==
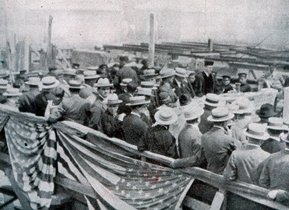
Ceremony in honor of the laying of the cornerstone, June 13, 1926.

The East Midwood Jewish Center synagogue building's architect is uncertain. The design is officially credited to the Building Committee and Irving Warshaw, the construction superintendent. The architect's name is not recorded in synagogue records, nor on the building's dedicatory plaque. The Center's National Register of Historic Places (NRHP) nomination form, however, argues that the architect was Louis Abramson, based on visual evidence and one piece of written evidence.

Abramson was a leading architect of synagogue-centers at that time. He designed a number of New York examples, including the original synagogue-center, the Manhattan Jewish Center (1918), as well as the Brooklyn Jewish Center, the Flatbush Jewish Center, and the Ocean Parkway Jewish Center (all constructed in Brooklyn between 1920 and 1924). While the Flatbush Jewish Center has been completely remodeled, the Brooklyn and Ocean Parkway Jewish Centers are visually similar to the East Midwood Jewish Center, and the Brooklyn Jewish Center in particular has an identical layout. The written evidence consists of an entry in a souvenir journal commemorating the twentieth anniversary of the Flatbush Jewish Center, stating that Abramson drew East Midwood's plans. The NRHP nomination form speculates that Abramson drew the basic plans for the East Midwood Center, and that the Building Committee completed them, in order to save money.

Alternatively, Maurice Courland's 1957 obituary claims the East Midwood Jewish Center as his work. Courland also designed a number of synagogues and New York landmarks, including Brooklyn's Magen David Synagogue.

== Notable members ==
Famous congregational members have included Supreme Court Justice Ruth Bader Ginsburg, who was confirmed at East Midwood, rather than having her bat mitzvah there, because (at the time) Conservative Judaism did not have bat mitzvah ceremonies for girls (a fact Ginsberg could not understand). When Ginsberg was 13 she also had essays published in the synagogue's bulletin about Stephen S. Wise, and on prejudice and world unity following the Holocaust. Filmmaker Marc Levin was also a member; Levin's grandfather, Herman Levin, had been a president of the East Midwood Jewish Center, and had also helped found, and been a long-time lay-leader of, the Reconstructionist movement.

East Midwood has also had members who have died under tragic circumstances, including Jason Sekzer, who was killed in the September 11, 2001 attacks, and Danny Farkas, a New York police lieutenant and National Guard soldier who died while stationed in Kabul, Afghanistan.

== Media appearances ==
In 2018 scenes from the television series The Marvelous Mrs. Maisel were filmed here.

== Bibliography ==
- History, East Midwood Jewish Center website. Accessed January 28, 2010.
- Mission & History, East Midwood Jewish Center website. Accessed June 16, 2019.
- Staff, East Midwood Jewish Center website. Accessed June 16, 2019.
- In Loving Memory: Rabbi Aaron Pomerantz, East Midwood Jewish Center website. Accessed January 28, 2010.
- "National Register of Historic Places Continuation Sheet" (PDF). National Park Service. NPS Form 10-900-a, OMB No. 1024-0018, Section 7. Archived from the original (PDF) on September 5, 2008 – via East Midwood Jewish Center.
- "National Register of Historic Places Continuation Sheet" (PDF). National Park Service. NPS Form 10-900-a, OMB No. 1024-0018, Section 8. Archived from the original (PDF) on September 5, 2008 – via East Midwood Jewish Center.
- "National Register of Historic Places Listings", June 16, 2006. Accessed January 28, 2010.
- "Governor Announces $25.3 Million in Environmental Protection Fund Grants For Projects Across New York", Press Release, Governor Eliot Spitzer, New York State Executive Chamber, November 29, 2007.
- "Environmental Protection Fund Projects", New York State Executive Chamber, November 29, 2007.
- "Mayor Jeered at Jewish Center As He Speaks on School Crisis; Mayor Jeered by Crowd at Brooklyn Jewish Center", The New York Times, October 16, 1968.
- "Herman Levin Is Dead; Jewish Lay Leader, 89", The New York Times, April 2, 1990.
- The 4,000 Jews Rumor, United States Department of State's Bureau of International Information Programs website, Resource Tools, Identifying Misinformation, September 12, 2007. Accessed January 28, 2010.
- Bader Ginsburg, Ruth. My Own Words, Simon & Schuster, 2016. ISBN 978-1-5011-4526-1
- Barton, Evan. "Brooklyn’s Oldest Synagogue Celebrates Its 150th Anniversary", Brooklyn Eagle, June 22, 2006.
- Brownmiller, Susan. "Susan Brownmiller", Statement, Jewish Women's Archive. Accessed June 17, 2019.
- Chandler, Doug. "Jewish Soldier, Police Officer, Mourned", The Jewish Week, July 16, 2008.
- Dash Moore, Deborah. "Rev. of The Strike That Changed New York: Blacks, Whites, and the Ocean Hill-Brownsville Crisis", American Jewish History, Volume 91, Number 1, March 2003, pp. 176–180.
- Dickter, Adam. "A Conservative Remarriage", The Jewish Week, March 6, 2009.
- Dolsten, Josefin. "Read 13-year-old Ruth Bader Ginsburg’s essay in her synagogue bulletin", Jewish Telegraphic Agency, October 1, 2016.
- Fioravante, Janice. "If You're Thinking of Living In/Midwood;A Rich Ethnic Mix in Mid-Brooklyn", The New York Times, July 21, 1996.
- Edward, Daniel. "Cop who Died in Kabul Mourned as a 'Role Model', Newsday, July 15, 2008.
- Gay, Kathlyn (ed.). "Brownmiller, Susan (1935–", American Dissidents: An Encyclopedia of Activists, Subversives, and Prisoners of Conscience, Volume 1, ABC-CLIO, 2012.
- Ginsberg, Johanna R. "Atonement, take nine", New Jersey Jewish News, September 13, 2018.
- Greenwald, Judith R., "First Synagogues: The First 144 Years of Congregation Baith Israel Anshei Emes (The Kane Street Synagogue)", in Abramovitch, Ilana and Galvin, Seán. Jews of Brooklyn, University Press of New England, November 1, 2001. ISBN 978-1-58465-003-4
- Howe, Kathy. "National Register of Historic Places Registration Form" (PDF)., Jewish Center of Kings Highway, United States Department of the Interior, National Park Service, NPS Form 10-900, OMB No. 1024-0018.
- Jacobs, Andrew. "Blessing the Fallen, and Propping Up Those Left Behind", The New York Times, Section B, Column 2, Metropolitan Desk, p. 1.
- Kahlenberg, Richard D. Tough liberal: Albert Shanker and the battles over schools, unions, race, and democracy, Columbia University Press, 2007. ISBN 978-0-231-13496-5
- Kalish, Jon. "Filmmaker Confronts ‘Protocols’ Myth in Documentary", The Forward, January 14, 2005.
- Kass, Alvin. "Brooklyn Is In!", June 2006, East Midwood Jewish Center website. Accessed January 28, 2010.
- Koppell, Bonnie. "Prager's lasting effect", Jewish News of Greater Phoenix, February 20, 2004, Vol. 56, No. 22.
- Kaufman, David. Shul with a Pool: The "synagogue-center" in American Jewish History, Brandeis University Press, University Press of New England, 1999. ISBN 978-0-87451-893-1
- Levin, Carol. "The Weinberg Family: Leaders during the Synagogue’s Golden Age", Kane Street Synagogue, The Synagogue Journal, Issue 11, March 17, 2006.
- Lipsyte, Robert. "Some Days, the Rabbi Wears Blue", The New York Times, September 15, 1996.
- McFadden, Robert D. "John V. Lindsay, Mayor and Maverick, Dies at 79", The New York Times, December 21, 2000.
- "2007 Annual Report" (PDF). New York Landmarks Conservancy.
- "Maurice Courland, Architect, Dies at 65; Expert on Synagogue and School Design", The New York Times, November 18, 1957, p. 31.
- Parker, Milton; Freeman, Allyn. How to feed friends and influence people: the Carnegie Deli—a giant sandwich, a little deli, a huge success, John Wiley & Sons, 2004. ISBN 978-0-471-68056-7
- Pogrebin, Abigail. Stars of David: Prominent Jews Talk About Being Jewish, Random House, 2007. ISBN 978-0-7679-1613-4
- Siegel, Jennifer. "Will Conservative Day Schools Survive?", The Forward, Jun 5, 2008.
- Waggoner, Walter H. "Harry Halpern, 82, Jewish Leader, Dies", The New York Times, June 12, 1981.
- Yaniv, Oren. "Grief for Brooklyn son lost in Afghanistan", New York Daily News, July 14, 2008.
