= Timeline of LGBTQ Jewish history =

This is a timeline of LGBT Jewish history, which consists of events at the intersection of Judaism and queer people.

== Timeline ==
=== 1st millennium BCE ===
==== 4th century BCE ====
- c. 486 BCE - Darius the Great adopted the Holiness code of the Book of Leviticus for Persian Jews of the Achaemenid Empire, enacting the first state sanctioned death penalty for male same-sex intercourse.

=== 14th century ===
- 1322 CE - The Provençal-Jewish poet Kalonymus ben Kalonymus writes "On Becoming a Woman", expressing lament at and cursing having been born male, referring to their penis as a "defect" (Hebrew: מוּם, romanized: mûm), and wishes to have been created as a woman.
- 1345 CE - Juce Abolfaça and Simuel Nahamán, two Jews from Puente la Reina, are chained to a tree and burned to death in Olite "because they had committed the sodomitical sin with each other."

=== 15th century ===
- 1403 CE - Isaach Salamó, a Jew, is burned in Perpignan (then part of Catalonia) for homosexuality.

=== 16th century ===
- 1593 CE - Allegro Orsini, a Jew, is beheaded with Ottaviano Bargellini, a member of a senatorial family, in Bologna for sodomy. Allegro converted to Christianity as Paolo shortly before his death. Allegro's body was later publicly displayed in Piazza Maggiore.

=== 19th century ===
- c. 1894-1943 - Jiří Langer, an early writer in Modern Hebrew, included homoerotic themes in his work.

=== 1960s ===
- 1965 - Women of Reform Judaism officially supported decriminalization of homosexuality in the United States of America.

=== 1970s ===
- 1972 - Beth Chayim Chadashim was founded in 1972 as the first LGBTQ synagogue in the world, and the first LGBT synagogue recognized by the Union for Reform Judaism.
- 1973 - Congregation Beth Simchat Torah (CBST) was founded in New York.
- 1975 - Congregation Or Chadash was founded in Chicago.
- 1977 - Beth Chayim Chadashim became the first LGBT synagogue to own its own building.
- 1977 - Congregation Sha'ar Zahav was founded in San Francisco.
- 1977 - The Central Conference of American Rabbis (CCAR), which is the Union for Reform Judaism's principal body, adopted a resolution calling for legislation decriminalizing homosexual acts between consenting adults, and calling for an end to discrimination against gays and lesbians. The resolution called on Reform Jewish organizations to develop programs to implement this stand.
- 1978 - Allen Bennett became the first openly gay rabbi in the United States.

=== 1980s ===
- 1980 - Lionel Blue became the first British rabbi to come out as gay.
- 1982 - Congregation Ahavat Shalom was founded in San Francisco, led by Allen Bennett.
- 1984 - Reconstructionist Judaism became the first Jewish denomination to allow openly gay and lesbian rabbis and cantors.
- 1986 - Congregation Bet Haverim was founded in Atlanta, GA.
- 1988 - Stacy Offner became the first openly lesbian rabbi hired by a mainstream Jewish congregation, Shir Tikvah Congregation of Minneapolis (a Reform Jewish congregation).

=== 1990s ===
- 1990 - The Union for Reform Judaism announced a national policy declaring lesbian and gay Jews to be full and equal members of the religious community. Its principal body, the Central Conference of American Rabbis (CCAR), officially endorsed a report of their committee on homosexuality and rabbis. They concluded that "all rabbis, regardless of sexual orientation, be accorded the opportunity to fulfill the sacred vocation that they have chosen" and that "all Jews are religiously equal regardless of their sexual orientation."
- 1993 - A Reconstructionist Jewish movement Commission issued: Homosexuality and Judaism: The Reconstructionist Position.
- 1995 - Rabbi Margaret Wenig (who was openly lesbian) had her essay "Truly Welcoming Lesbian and Gay Jews" published in The Jewish Condition: Essays on Contemporary Judaism Honoring Rabbi Alexander M. Schindler; it was the first published argument to the Jewish community on behalf of civil marriage for gay couples.
- 1996 - The Central Conference of American Rabbis passed a resolution approving same-sex civil marriage. However, this same resolution made a distinction between civil marriages and religious marriages.
- 1998 - After she won the Eurovision song competition, a serious religious debate was held as to whether, and how, Dana International, a transgender woman, should pray in a synagogue. One rabbinical authority concluded that Dana should be counted in a minyan as a man, but could not sing in front of the community since she was also a woman, according to the rabbi, and that would violate the Orthodox rule of kol isha.
- 1999 - Steven Greenberg publicly came out as gay in an article in the Israeli newspaper Maariv. As he has a semikhah (rabbinical ordination) from the Orthodox rabbinical seminary of Rabbi Isaac Elchanan Theological Seminary, he is generally described as the first openly gay Orthodox Jewish rabbi. However, some Orthodox Jews, including many rabbis, dispute his being an Orthodox rabbi.

=== 2000s ===
- 2000 - In March 2000 the Central Conference of American Rabbis issued a new resolution stating that "We do hereby resolve that the relationship of a Jewish, same gender couple is worthy of affirmation through appropriate Jewish ritual, and further resolve, that we recognize the diversity of opinions within our ranks on this issue. We support the decision of those who choose to officiate at rituals of union for same-sex couples, and we support the decision of those who do not."
- 2000 - Hebrew Union College-Jewish Institute of Religion established the Institute for Judaism, Sexual Orientation & Gender Identity to "educate HUC-JIR students on lesbian, gay, bisexual and transgender issues to help them challenge and eliminate homophobia and heterosexism; and to learn tools to be able to transform the communities they encounter into ones that are inclusive and welcoming of LGBT Jews." It was the first institute of its kind in the Jewish world.
- 2002 - At the Reform seminary Hebrew Union College-Jewish Institute of Religion in New York, the Reform rabbi Margaret Wenig (who was openly lesbian) organized the first school-wide seminar at any rabbinical school which addressed the psychological, legal, and religious issues affecting people who are intersex or transsexual.
- 2003 - Reuben Zellman became the first openly transgender person accepted to the Hebrew Union College-Jewish Institute of Religion, where he was ordained in 2010.
- 2003 - The Union for Reform Judaism retroactively applied its pro-rights policy on gays and lesbians to the bisexual and transgender communities, issuing a resolution titled, "Support for the Inclusion and Acceptance of the Transgender and Bisexual Communities".
- 2003 - Women of Reform Judaism issued a statement describing their support for human and civil rights and the struggles of the bisexual and transgender communities, and saying, "Women of Reform Judaism accordingly: Calls for civil rights protections from all forms of discrimination against bisexual and transgender individuals; Urges that such legislation allows transgender individuals to be seen under the law as the gender by which they identify; and Calls upon sisterhoods to hold informative programs about the transgender and bisexual communities."
- 2003 - The Committee on Jewish Law and Standards approved a rabbinic ruling that concluded that sex reassignment surgery (SRS) is permissible as a treatment of gender dysphoria, and that a transgender person's sex status under Jewish law is changed by SRS.
- 2003 - The Reform rabbi Margaret Wenig (who was openly lesbian) organized the first school-wide seminar at the Reconstructionist Rabbinical College which addressed the psychological, legal, and religious issues affecting people who are intersex or transsexual.
- 2004 - The Society for Humanistic Judaism issued a resolution supporting "the legal recognition of marriage and divorce between adults of the same sex," and affirming "the value of marriage between any two committed adults with the sense of obligations, responsibilities, and consequences thereof."
- 2004 - The Association of Humanistic Rabbis issued a pro-LGBT statement titled "In Support of Diverse Sexualities and Gender Identities".
- 2005 - Eli Cohen became the first openly gay man to be ordained a rabbi by the Jewish Renewal Movement.
- 2006 - In Conservative Judaism, the Committee on Jewish Law and Standards (CJLS) of the Rabbinical Assembly makes the movement's decisions concerning Jewish law. On December 6, 2006, The CJLS adopted three distinct responsa reflecting very different approaches to homosexuality. One responsum substantially liberalized Conservative Judaism's approach including lifting most (but not all) classical prohibitions on homosexual conduct and permitted the blessing of homosexual unions and the ordination of openly gay/lesbian/bisexual clergy. Two others completely retained traditional prohibitions. Under the rules of the Conservative movement, the adoption of multiple opinions permits individual Conservative rabbis, congregations, and rabbinical schools to select which opinion to accept, and hence to choose individually whether to maintain a traditional prohibition on homosexual conduct, or to permit openly gay/lesbian/bisexual unions and clergy. The liberalizing responsum, adopted as a majority opinion by 13 of 25 votes, was authored by Rabbis Elliot N. Dorff, Daniel Nevins, and Avram Reisner. It lifted most restrictions on homosexual conduct and opened the way to the ordination of openly gay/lesbian/bisexual rabbis and cantors and acceptance of homosexual unions, but stopped short of religiously recognizing same-sex marriage. The responsum invoked the Talmudic principle of kavod habriyot, which the authors translated as "human dignity", as authority for this approach. The responsum maintained a prohibition on male-male anal sex, which it described as the sole Biblically prohibited homosexual act. This act remains a yehareg ve'al ya'avor ("die rather than transgress" offense) under the decision. The Ziegler School of Rabbinic Studies of the University of Judaism (now the American Jewish University) in Los Angeles had previously stated that it would immediately begin admitting gay/lesbian/bisexual students as soon as the law committee passed a policy that sanctioned such ordination.
- 2006 - Chaya Gusfield and Rabbi Lori Klein, both ordained in America, became the first openly lesbian rabbis ordained by the Jewish Renewal movement.
- 2006 - Conservative Judaism decided to allow openly lesbian rabbis and cantors.
- 2006 - Elliot Kukla, who came out as transgender six months before his ordination in 2006, was the first openly transgender person to be ordained by the Hebrew Union College-Jewish Institute of Religion.
- 2007 - The Union for Reform Judaism issued a new edition of Kulanu, their resource manual for gay, lesbian, bisexual and transgender inclusion, which for the first time included a blessing sanctifying the sex-change process. It was written by Elliot Kukla at the request of a friend of his who was transgender.
- 2007 - On March 26, 2007, the Jewish Theological Seminary of America in New York began accepting openly gay/lesbian/bisexual candidates for admission for their Rabbinical program.
- 2007 - Jalda Rebling, a German woman born in the Netherlands, became the first openly lesbian cantor ordained by the Jewish Renewal movement.
- 2007 - Rabbi Toba Spitzer became the first openly lesbian or gay person to head a rabbinical assembly when she was elected president of the Reconstructionist Rabbinical Assembly at the group's annual convention, held in Scottsdale, Arizona.
- 2007 - Joy Ladin became the first openly transgender professor at an Orthodox institution (Stern College for Women of Yeshiva University).
- 2007 - In Israel, a neo-Nazi group of immigrants (from Russia) called Patrol 36, all of whom were of Jewish descent, some of whom had immigrated under the Law of Return, and one of whom was a grandchild of a Holocaust survivor, were violent against gays and others, as well as committing vandalism and voicing anti-Semitic rhetoric.
- 2008 - In an open letter distributed to Orthodox community leaders, the Hod organization (an independent Israel-based organization run by and intended for Orthodox Jewish homosexuals) appealed to the Orthodox community to recognize them as part of the religious society. This was sent to over 100 rabbis in 2008, and eventually was known as the "Document of Principles". By 2013, 163 Orthodox rabbis from Israel and abroad had signed this statement, among them: rabbi Yuval Cherlow, rabbi Binyamin Lau, rabbi Haim Navon, rabbi Daniel Sperber, rabbi Eliezer Melamed, rabbi Shai Piron and rabbi Yehuda Gilad.
- 2008 - CBST publishes its Friday night prayer book, Siddur B'Chol L'vavcha, based on materials first published in 1981. Publisher: Congregation Beth Simchat Torah (2008)
- 2009 - Orthodox Israeli rabbi Ron Yosef became in 2009 the first Israeli orthodox rabbi to come out as gay, which he did when appearing on Uvda ("Fact"), Israel's leading investigative television program, in an episode regarding conversion therapies in Israel. Yosef remained in his position as a pulpit Rabbi.
- 2009 - Siddur Sha'ar Zahav, the first complete prayer book to address the lives and needs of LGBTQ as well as straight Jews, was published.
- 2009 - Juval Porat, who was openly gay, graduated from Abraham Geiger College and thus became the first person to be trained as a cantor in Germany since the Holocaust.

=== 2010s ===
- 2010 - The Society for Humanistic Judaism pledged to speak out against homophobic bullying.
- 2010 - TorahWeb.org published a brief position statement entitled "Torah View on Homosexuality". It was co-authored by Rav Hershel Schachter, Rav Mordechai Willig, Rav Michael Rosensweig, and Rav Mayer Twersky. These four are all roshei yeshiva (i.e., rabbinic leaders) at the Rabbi Isaac Elchanan Theological Seminary at Yeshiva University, the largest and most influential Modern Orthodox rabbinic program in America. In part, the statement reads:

"::... Prohibited homosexual activity includes any non-platonic physical contact; even yichud (seclusion) with someone of the same gender is forbidden for homosexually active individuals. ...

... today's galus [exile] seeks to legitimize and mainstream the abominable practice (toeiva) of homosexuality. Frighteningly, we who live here are not only practically affected, but also axiologically and ideationally infected. Not only our behavior but our very Weltanschauung has been compromised and contaminated.

... Homosexual behavior is absolutely prohibited and constitutes an abomination. Discreet, unconditionally halachically committed Jews who do not practice homosexuality but feel same sex attraction (ssa) should be sympathetically and wholeheartedly supported. They can be wonderful Jews, fully deserving of our love, respect, and support. They should be encouraged to seek professional guidance. Moreover, in an uninfected Torah society, appropriate sympathy for discreet shomrei Torah u'mitzvos who experience but do not act upon ssa is clearly distinguished from brazen public identification of their yetzer hara [temptation] for forbidden behavior. ...

How painful, sad and sobering is the sharp contrast between the clear attitude that should prevail in a pure Torah community and the confusion that exists among well-intentioned individuals within our communities. ... ssa is not viewed as a challenge of kevishas hayetzer (overcoming and taming impulses for forbidden behavior), but rather as a troubling halacha lacking in compassion, rachmanah litzlan [God forbid].

... Inevitably, with respect to homosexuality, Talmud Torah [Torah study] will place us at odds with political correctness and the temper of the times. Nevertheless, we must be honest with ourselves, and with Hakadosh Baruch Hu [God], regardless of political correctness, considerations or consequences."

- 2010 - On July 22, 2010, a "Statement of Principles on the Place of Jews with a Homosexual Orientation in Our Community" was released. It was written primarily by Nathaniel Helfgot, Aryeh Klapper, and Yitzchak Blau. Signatories include more than a hundred rabbis and laypeople. Some of the statement's more notable supporters are Rabbi Marc Angel, co-founder of The Rabbinic Fellowship; Rabbi Shlomo Riskin, founder of Lincoln Square Synagogue, Efrat, and Ohr Torah Stone Institutions; and Rabbi Avi Weiss, head of the Hebrew Institute of Riverdale, founder of Yeshivat Chovevei Torah and Yeshivat Maharat, and co-founder of The Rabbinic Fellowship. The statement makes it clear that homosexual activity is still prohibited, saying inter alia that "Halakhah sees heterosexual marriage as the ideal model and sole legitimate outlet for human sexual expression"; "Halakhic Judaism views all male and female same-sex sexual interactions as prohibited"; and "halakhic values proscribe individuals and communities from encouraging practices that grant religious legitimacy to gay marriage and couplehood". However, it emphasizes that homosexuals need to be treated with compassion and respect. Some of the statement's points that diverge from other common Orthodox positions are [the asterisk before each point has been removed for clarity]: "We affirm the religious right of those with a homosexual orientation to reject therapeutic approaches they reasonably see as useless or dangerous. We believe that the decision as to whether to be open about one's sexual orientation should be left to such individuals, who should consider their own needs and those of the community. We are opposed on ethical and moral grounds to both the "outing" of individuals who want to remain private and to coercing those who desire to be open about their orientation to keep it hidden. Communities should display sensitivity, acceptance and full embrace of the adopted or biological children of homosexually active Jews in the synagogue and school setting. Jews who have an exclusively homosexual orientation should, under most circumstances, not be encouraged to marry someone of the other gender."
- 2011 - Rachel Isaacs became the first openly lesbian rabbi ordained by the Conservative movement's Jewish Theological Seminary.
- 2011 - After her ordination, Rachel Isaacs became the first openly gay rabbi to join the Rabbinical Assembly.
- 2011 - Sandra Lawson became the first openly gay African-American and first African-American admitted to the Reconstructionist Rabbinical College.
- 2012 - Emily Aviva Kapor, an American rabbi who had been ordained privately by a "Conservadox" rabbi in 2005, began living as a woman in 2012, thus becoming the first openly transgender female rabbi.
- 2012 - Rainbow Jews, an oral history project showcasing the lives of Jewish bisexual, lesbian, gay, and transgender people in the United Kingdom from the 1950s until the present, was launched. It is the United Kingdom's first archive of Jewish bisexual, lesbian, gay, and transgender history.
- 2012 - In June 2012, the American branch of Conservative Judaism formally approved same-sex marriage ceremonies in a 13–0 vote.
- 2012 - In November 2012, the Southern Poverty Law Center filed a lawsuit against JONAH (a Jewish ex-gay organization), Goldberg, and Downing on behalf of Unger, Levin, two other participants, and two of the participants' mothers for fraudulent practices which are illegal under New Jersey's consumer protection laws. The Southern Poverty Law Center noted that the lawsuit was "groundbreaking" insofar as it was the first time a conversion therapy provider had been sued for fraudulent business practices.
- 2012 - The Rabbinical Council of America (RCA), a professional association of more than 1,000 Orthodox rabbis around the world, sent an open email to its members that it no longer supported reparative therapy generally, or JONAH specifically.
- 2013 - Rabbi Deborah Waxman was elected as the President of the Reconstructionist Rabbinical College. As the President, she is believed to be the first woman and first lesbian to lead a Jewish congregational union, and the first female rabbi and first lesbian to lead a Jewish seminary; RRC is both a congregational union and a seminary.
- 2013 - The Reconstructionist Rabbinical Association elected as president Rabbi Jason Klein, the first openly gay man chosen to head a national rabbinical association of one of the major Jewish denominations in the United States.
- 2013 - The Reconstructionist Rabbinical Association (RRA) issued a resolution stating in part, "Therefore be it resolved that the RRA directs its executive director and board to move forward, in cooperation with the RRC [Reconstructionist Rabbinical College] and all relevant associated entities, in educating RRA members about issues of gender identity, to urge the Reconstructionist movement to similarly educate its constituency and to adopt policies that will do all that is possible to provide full employment opportunities for transgender and gender nonconforming rabbis, and to explore how the Reconstructionist movement can best influence the wider Jewish and non-Jewish world to [be] welcoming and inclusive of all people, regardless of gender identity."
- 2013 - Mark C. Goldman became the first openly gay president of the American Conference of Cantors, a Reform Jewish organization.
- 2014 - Britain's first Jewish lesbian marriage was held for Nicola Pettit, who was Jewish, and her girlfriend Tania Ward, in a ceremony which contained Jewish elements. They married in Brighton Town Hall, in southern England, and then had their union blessed by a rabbi. It was the first same-sex wedding involving a Jew since the same-sex marriage Act came into force.
- 2014 - The first Jewish boat participated in the Amsterdam Pride Canal Parade. Dana International was on the boat, as well as the Fokkens twins (Louise Fokkens and Martine Fokkens), who are famous in the Netherlands for having worked 50 years as sex workers in Amsterdam's Red Light District before their retirement earlier in 2014. Marianne van Praag, a Reform rabbi from The Hague, was the only rabbi aboard.
- 2014 - The memorial honoring LGBTQ people persecuted by the Nazis in Tel Aviv, the first specific recognition in Israel for non-Jewish victims of the Holocaust, was unveiled in 2014.
- 2014 - Mikie Goldstein became the first openly gay man to be ordained as a Conservative Jewish Rabbi. Later that year he became the Israeli Conservative movement's first openly gay congregational rabbi with his installation as spiritual leader of its synagogue in Rehovot (Congregation Adat Shalom-Emanuel).
- 2014 - The Central Conference of American Rabbis joined a lawsuit challenging North Carolina's ban on same-sex marriage, which was America's first faith-based challenge to same-sex marriage bans.
- 2014 - Becky Silverstein becomes the first out transgender rabbi hired by a Conservative congregation, Pasadena Jewish Temple and Center.
- 2015 - In January 2015 a transgender Jewish woman, Kay Long, was denied access to the Western Wall, first by the women's section and then by the men's section. Long's presence was prevented by "modesty police" at women's section who are not associated with the rabbi of the Western Wall or the site administration. They are a group of female volunteers who guard the entrance to the women's section preventing entry to visitors who are not dressed to their idea of Orthodox modesty standards for women. The director of Jerusalem's Open House, a community center for the lesbian, gay, bisexual and transgender community, noted that Long's experience was not unique. "Gender separation at the Western Wall is harmful for transgender people. This is not the first story that we know of with transgender religious people that wanted to go to the Western Wall and pray and couldn't," said Elinor Sidi, who expected that the battle for access to the Western Wall for the LGBTQ community would be a long and difficult one. It was later asserted that Kay Long would have been permitted in the women's section except for her clothing. "It was not an issue of her gender, but the way she was dressed."
- 2015 - Rabbi Denise Eger became the first openly gay president of the Central Conference of American Rabbis, which is the largest and oldest rabbinical organization in North America.
- 2015 - The Union for Reform Judaism passed a "Resolution on the Rights of Transgender and Gender Non-Conforming People" with 9 points calling for securing and defending the rights of transgender and gender non-confirming people to respectful and equitable treatment and affirming its own commitment to the continued pursuit of the same.
- 2015 - Abby Stein came out as transgender and thus became the first openly transgender woman (and the first woman) to have been ordained by an ultra-Orthodox institution, having received her rabbinical degree in 2011 from Yeshiva Viznitz in South Fallsburg, New York. However, this was before she was openly transgender, and she is no longer working as a rabbi as of 2016. She is also the first openly transgender woman raised in a Hasidic community, and is a direct descendant of Hasidic Judaism's founder the Baal Shem Tov.
- 2015 - The High Holy Days Reform Jewish prayer book Mishkan HaNefesh was released; it was intended as a companion to Mishkan T'filah. Mishkan HaNefesh can be translated as "sanctuary of the soul". It replaced a line from the Reform movement's earlier prayerbook, "Gates of Repentance", that mentioned the joy of a bride and groom specifically, with the line "rejoicing with couples under the chuppah [wedding canopy]", and added a third, non-gendered option to the way worshippers are called to the Torah, offering "mibeit," Hebrew for "from the house of," in addition to the traditional "son of" or "daughter of."
- 2016 - The first Jewish same-sex wedding ceremony in Latin America was celebrated in Buenos Aires; the wedding was for Victoria Escobar and Romina Charur and was officiated by Rabbi Karina Finkielstein.
- 2016 - An edict signed by dozens of Israeli Orthodox rabbis and published in 2016 by the Israeli Modern Orthodox rabbinic group Beit Hillel, a group which promotes inclusiveness in Orthodox Judaism, stated in part, "according to the Torah and halacha, the [same-sex sexual] acts are forbidden but not the proclivities, and therefore people with same-sex tendencies, men and women, have no invalidation in halacha or tradition. They are obligated by the commandments of the Torah, they can fulfill a [ritual] obligation on behalf of the public and carry out all of the community functions just like any member." It also stated in part, "just as it [is] inconceivable to mock someone for being physically, behaviorally, or mentally different, so too those with same-sex tendencies should not be mocked. On the contrary, those around them — family and community — should show special feeling for them, and apply to them the Torah commandment of 'Love thy neighbor as thyself' and to be diligent in avoiding the prohibition of insulting another."
- 2016 - The Rabbinical Assembly passed a "Resolution Affirming the Rights of Transgender and Gender Non-Conforming People".
- 2017 - The Reconstructionist Rabbinical Association approved a resolution committing themselves to work for "full inclusion, acceptance, appreciation, celebration and welcome of people of all gender identities in Jewish life and in society at large"; the resolution also "strongly advocates for the full equality of transgender, non-binary, and gender non-conforming people and for equal protections for people of all gender identities under the law, at all levels of government, in North America and Israel."
- 2017 - Chicago Dyke March organizers singled out three women, including Eleanor Shoshany Anderson and Laurel Grauer, carrying Jewish pride flags and began questioning them on their political stance in regards to Zionism and Israel. After a discussion, organizers asked them to leave the event, insisting that the rainbow flag with the Star of David "made people feel unsafe" and that the Dyke March was "pro-Palestinian and anti-Zionist". The incident prompted widespread criticism and accusations of anti-Semitism among organizers of the event. Dyke March Chicago initially stated that the women were removed due to the flags, and asked pro-Palestinian organizations to release statements of solidarity while they crafted an official statement. March organizers later released an updated statement maintaining that the women (one of whom they described as a "pro-Israel activist") were asked to leave due to their "Zionist stance and support for Israel", and not the use of Jewish symbols. Jewish Voice for Peace Chicago, which had members at the march, corroborated their account.
- 2018 - Sandra Lawson was ordained and thus became the first openly gay, female, black rabbi in the world.
- 2019 - Daniel Atwood became the first openly gay Orthodox person to be ordained as a rabbi; he was ordained by the rabbi Daniel Landes, in Jerusalem.
- 2019 - The 2019 Washington, D.C. Dyke March adopted a policy that Israeli national symbols, including the Star of David when centered on a flag, could not be displayed, while "Jewish stars and other identifications and celebrations of Jewishness (yarmulkes, talit, other expressions of Judaism or Jewishness) are welcome and encouraged". March organizers stated that the Star of David only became a Jewish symbol with the advent of modern Zionism. D.C. Dyke March organizers stated that trained "marshals and de-escalators" would be present to deal with people who brought "signs or flags that don't really align with the mission and values of the Dyke March." Palestinian flags and symbols were permitted. More than two dozen Jewish lesbians and their supporters brought the prohibited flag and symbol to the march. They debated the perceived mistreatment and exclusion with march organizer Jill Raney. Thereafter, D.C. Dyke March organizers allowed the group to participate in the march with their LGBT Jewish Pride flags.

=== 2020s ===
- 2019/2020 - Students at Yeshiva University led advocacy efforts to end LGBTQ+ discrimination in their Orthodox undergraduate community, facilitated a Pride March, and ultimately filed a discrimination complaint against Yeshiva University with the NYC Human Rights Commission for refusing to authorize an LGBTQ+ club for a second year in a row.
- 2022 - The Committee on Jewish Law and Standards approved a ruling authorizing non-gendered language for the aliyah, and the honors of the hagbah (lifting the Torah) and the gelilah (rolling up the Torah). The ruling also includes non-gendered language for calling up Cohens and Levis (descendants of the tribe of Levi) as well as how to address people without gendered language during the prayer Mi Shebeirach. This was a codification of a practice that already existed in places Jewish transgender people led.
- May 2023 - The first transgender/non-binary cantors were ordained at Hebrew Union College, a group of three: Cantors Jordan Goldstein, Kalix Jacobson, and Ze'evi Tovlev.
- October 2023 - The Forward reported about Shua Brick, "experts say that Brick is the first openly gay rabbi to serve on the clergy of an Orthodox synagogue in the U.S.", explaining that Brick "runs the youth program, leads Torah study for adults, and fills in when the senior rabbi is out of town" at Beth Jacob Congregation in Oakland, California, where he started coming out as gay to members of the congregation over a year prior to October 2023. He was ordained by Yeshiva University.
- 2024 - In April 2024, Aaron Weininger was installed as the first openly gay senior rabbi of any large Conservative congregation, as senior rabbi of the Adath Jeshurun Congregation.
- 2025 - Tadhg Cleary became the first openly gay rabbi ordained by an American Orthodox institution, upon being ordained by Yeshivat Chovevei Torah.

== See also ==
- Sexuality and Judaism
- Homosexuality and Judaism
- Same-sex marriage and Judaism
- Transgender people and Judaism
- LGBT-affirming denominations in Judaism
- LGBT clergy in Judaism
- LGBT rights in Israel
- Jewish LGBT organizations
- List of LGBT Jews
