= LGBTQ clergy in Judaism =

Queer people ordained as rabbis and/or cantors

The first openly lesbian, gay, bisexual, and transgender clergy in Judaism were ordained as rabbis and/or cantors in the second half of the 20th century.

== History ==
=== 20th century ===
Allen Bennett became the first openly gay rabbi in the United States in 1978.

Lionel Blue was the first British rabbi to publicly declare himself as gay, which he did in 1980.

Admission to rabbinical seminary and ordination for openly LGBT people began in 1984, when the Reconstructionist Rabbinical College, the seminary of Reconstructionist Judaism, voted to accept and ordain rabbis without regard to their sexual orientation. The same year the Reconstructionist Rabbinical College admitted Jane Rachel Litman, who is openly bisexual, and she was ordained in 1989. In 1985 the Reconstructionist Rabbinical College graduated and ordained Deborah Brin, an out lesbian.

In 1988 Stacy Offner became the first openly lesbian rabbi hired by a mainstream Jewish congregation—Shir Tikvah Congregation of Minneapolis, a Reform Jewish congregation.

Leo Baeck College in London admitted its first openly LGBT students in 1984. Two openly lesbian rabbis were ordained in 1989: Rabbi Sheila Shulman and Rabbi Elizabeth Tikvah Sarah.

In 1989, at the strong urging of the UAHC (Union of American Hebrew Congregations) now known as Union for Reform Judaism (URJ), the seminary of the Reform movement, the Hebrew Union College-Jewish Institute of Religion, changed its admission requirements to allow openly lesbian and gay people to join the student body. Four open LGBTQ applicants were then accepted as students, Leslie Bergson, Peter Kessler, Stephen Roberts and Burt Schuman. In 1989, consistent with its admission policies of its seminary, the UAHC (now known as URJ) announced a national policy declaring lesbian and gay Jews to be full and equal members of the religious community. Its principal rabbinic body, the Central Conference of American Rabbis, which is the largest and oldest rabbinical organization in North America, officially endorsed a report of its own Ad Hoc Committee on Homosexuality and the Rabbinate. This position paper urged that "all rabbis, regardless of sexual orientation, be accorded the opportunity to fulfill the sacred vocation that they have chosen." The committee endorsed the view that "all Jews are religiously equal regardless of their sexual orientation."

Rabbi Steven Greenberg has been described as the first gay rabbi with a rabbinic ordination from the Orthodox rabbinical seminary (of Yeshiva University (RIETS)). He is described as the first openly gay Orthodox-ordained Jewish rabbi, since he publicly disclosed he is gay in an article in the Israeli newspaper Maariv in 1999 and participated in a 2001 documentary film about gay men and women raised in the Orthodox Jewish world. However, some Orthodox Jews, including many rabbis, dispute his status as an Orthodox rabbi.

=== 21st century ===
==== 2000s ====
In 2003 Reuben Zellman became the first openly transgender person accepted to the Hebrew Union College-Jewish Institute of Religion, where he was ordained in 2010. Elliot Kukla, who came out as transgender six months before his ordination in 2006, was the first openly transgender person to be ordained by the Hebrew Union College-Jewish Institute of Religion.

In 2005, Eli Cohen became the first openly gay man to be ordained a rabbi by the Jewish Renewal Movement.

In 2006, Chaya Gusfield and Lori Klein, both ordained in America, became the first openly lesbian rabbis ordained by the Jewish Renewal movement. Also in 2006, the Committee on Jewish Law and Standards, the body for Conservative Judaism, adopted two majority opinions, one allowing the ordination of LGBT clergy, as well as the blessing of same-sex unions, and lifting prohibitions on most (but not all) same-sex conduct (specifically not same-sex anal sex) and the other majority opinion retaining traditional opinions. In response, the two primary seminaries for Conservative Judaism, the Jewish Theological Seminary of America and Ziegler School of Rabbinic Studies, started allowing openly LGBT students. Also in 2006, Chaya Gusfield and Rabbi Lori Klein became the two first openly lesbian rabbis ordained by the Jewish Renewal movement. They were both ordained at the same time in January 2006.

In 2007 Rabbi Toba Spitzer became the first openly lesbian or gay person chosen to head a rabbinical association in the United States when she was elected president of the Reconstructionist Rabbinical Association at the group's annual convention, held in Scottsdale, Arizona.

Also in 2007, Jalda Rebling, born in Amsterdam and now living in Germany, became the first openly lesbian cantor ordained by the Jewish Renewal movement.

In April 2009, Rabbi Ron Yosef became the first Israeli orthodox rabbi to come out, by appearing on Uvda ("Fact"), Israel's leading investigative television program. Yosef remains in his position as a pulpit Rabbi in Netanya. Yosef received death threats in the year leading up to the 2009 Tel Aviv gay centre shooting. Yosef said that he hopes that his coming out and his visibility as a homosexual rabbi in the orthodox community will be equivalent to participating in the pride parade, which he and the organization he founded (Hod) oppose.

Also in 2009 Juval Porat, who is openly gay, graduated from Abraham Geiger College and thus became the first person to be trained as a cantor in Germany since the Holocaust. In 2010 he became the cantor for Temple Beth Chayim Chadashim, a Los Angeles Reform synagogue.

==== 2010s ====
In May 2010, Anna Maranta became the first lesbian rabbi to be privately ordained in Ottawa, Ontario, Canada. She serves The Glebe Minyan, a post-denominational Jewish Renewal community.

In May 2011, Rachel Isaacs became the first openly lesbian rabbi ordained by the Conservative movement's Jewish Theological Seminary ("JTS"). She transferred to JTS from the Reform movement's Hebrew Union College-Jewish Institute of Religion in her third year of rabbinical school. Also in 2011, after her ordination Isaacs became the first openly gay rabbi to join the Rabbinical Assembly.

Also in 2011, the bisexual rights activist Debra Kolodny was ordained as a rabbi by the Jewish Renewal movement and hired as the rabbi for congregation P'nai Or of Portland, Oregon.

Also in 2011, Sandra Lawson became the first openly gay African-American and the first African-American admitted to the Reconstructionist Rabbinical College. She was ordained and thus became the first openly gay, female, black rabbi in the world in 2018.

Emily Aviva Kapor, who had been ordained privately by a "Conservadox" rabbi in 2005, began living as a woman in 2012, thus becoming the first openly transgender female rabbi.

In 2013, Rabbi Deborah Waxman was elected as the president of the Reconstructionist Rabbinical College. As the President, she is believed to be the first woman and first lesbian to lead a Jewish congregational union, and the first female rabbi and first lesbian to lead a Jewish seminary; the Reconstructionist Rabbinical College is both a congregational union and a seminary.

Also in 2013, Rabbi Jason Klein became the first openly gay man chosen to head a national rabbinical association of one of the major Jewish denominations in the United States when he was elected president of the Reconstructionist Rabbinical Association at the group's annual convention, held in New Orleans.

In 2014, Mikie Goldstein became the first openly gay man to be ordained as a Conservative Jewish rabbi. Later that year he became the Israeli Conservative movement's first openly gay congregational rabbi with his installation as spiritual leader of its synagogue in Rehovot (Congregation Adat Shalom-Emanuel). He was born in Britain and studied for the rabbinate in New York.

Also in 2014, Becky Silverstein was the first out transgender rabbi hired by a Conservative synagogue, Pasadena Jewish Temple and Center.

Also in 2014, Nehirim's first retreat for LGBT rabbis, rabbinic pastors, cantors, and students was held in San Francisco.

In March 2015, Rabbi Denise Eger became the first openly gay president of the Central Conference of American Rabbis, which is the largest and oldest rabbinical organization in North America.

In November 2015 Abby Stein came out as transgender and thus became the first openly transgender woman to have been ordained by an Orthodox institution, having received her rabbinical degree in 2012, from an Ultra-Orthodox Hasidic school. To date, she is also thus the only female rabbi to have been ordained by an Ultra-Orthodox institution. She was ordained before transitioning; however, afterwards, as of 2020, she had re-embraced her title as rabbi, and was working in many capacities as a rabbi.

In 2019, Daniel Atwood, a gay rabbinical student who was denied ordination by New York's Yeshivat Chovevei Torah despite the school previously saying it would ordain him, was welcomed into the rabbinate in Jerusalem, breaking a longstanding taboo against homosexuality in the Orthodox community. He was the first openly gay Orthodox person to be ordained as a rabbi, and was ordained by the rabbi Daniel Landes. Atwood became engaged to his male partner in 2018.

Together, Reconstructionist Judaism, Jewish Renewal, Reform Judaism, and Conservative Judaism make up 76% of Jewish Americans who belong to a synagogue. The remainder of synagogue-belonging Jews belong to either Orthodox Judaism, at 21%, who do not ordain openly LGBT Jews, and a remaining 3% belonging to either an unaffiliated synagogue or another Jewish denomination that may or may not ordain openly LGBT Jews.

==== 2020s ====
In October 2023, The Forward reported about Shua Brick, “experts say that Brick is the first openly gay rabbi to serve on the clergy of an Orthodox synagogue in the U.S.”, explaining that Brick “runs the youth program, leads Torah study for adults, and fills in when the senior rabbi is out of town” at Beth Jacob Congregation in Oakland, California, where he started coming out as gay to members of the congregation over a year prior to October 2023. He was ordained by Yeshiva University.

In June 2025, Yeshivat Chovevei Torah became the first Orthodox rabbinical school in the United States to ordain an openly gay rabbi, by ordaining Tadhg Cleary.

== See also ==
- Timeline of LGBT Jewish history
- LGBT-affirming denominations in Judaism
- Homosexuality and Judaism
- Sexuality and Judaism
- Judaism and sexuality
- Same-sex marriage and Judaism
- LGBT rights in Israel
- List of LGBT Jews
