= Same-sex marriage and Judaism =

Same-sex marriage in Judaism has been a subject of debate within Jewish denominations. The traditional view among Jews is to regard same-sex relationships as categorically forbidden by the Torah. This remains the current view of Orthodox Judaism.

As the issue of same-sex marriage has broached the forefront of social and political consciousness in the United States over the past few years, it has also become more prevalent in the Jewish community as well. Certain branches of Judaism that had until recently been less open to gay rights have made organizational changes on the issues. The Conservative Movement was the last of Judaism’s liberal streams to adopt a more progressive streamlined approach to dealing with issues related to homosexuality. Even within the insular Orthodox community, there is a small, but growing population of individuals and leaders who are actively engaged in the struggle for same-sex marriage as a secular institution in America. Rabbi Steven Greenberg is an openly gay rabbi who is leading the charge among open-minded and traditionally-observant Jews around the world. Leading rabbis have denounced reparative therapy and have embraced a much more toned-down approach to homosexuality in Judaism. Each year dozens of observant Jewish students "come out of the closet" and many have increasingly remained involved in organized Jewish life.

Organizations have been established to assist Jews struggling with the perceived dichotomy between living a traditional Jewish life and being homosexual. Eshel was established by Rabbi Greenberg as a platform to advocate for greater acceptance of LGBT Jews in Orthodox life. Jewish Queer Youth (JQY) also exists as a platform to connect with and advocate for LGBT rights within Jewish communities across the United States.

== Branches of Judaism ==
=== Orthodox Judaism ===
Orthodox Judaism maintains the traditional Jewish bans on both sexual acts and marriage amongst members of the same sex. The Orthodox Union in the United States supported a federal Constitutional amendment banning same-sex marriages. In Australia, the Organisation of Rabbis Australasia (ORA) have made submissions and written public letters against legalising same-sex marriage. Despite the general consensus against same-sex marriage, there are some dissenters including Rabbi Steven Greenberg who argues new interpretation of the halacha that is more accepting of homosexual people is required. Rabbi Greenberg became the first rabbi to officiate at a same-sex wedding that was legally recognized by the local government in November 2011.

=== Conservative Judaism ===
The American branch of Conservative Judaism formally approves of same-sex marriage ceremonies. The issue was previously introduced in the Law Committee of Conservative Judaism in December 2006 which simultaneously prohibited same-sex marriage in Conservative Judaism and allowed Conservative Rabbis to perform same-sex commitment ceremonies. The ruling was reversed, however, in June 2012, the Committee of Jewish Law and Standards voted on the issue of same-sex marriage with thirteen for, zero against, and one abstention. The committee also established two different services that can be used as a guide for rabbis marrying a same-sex couple though neither applies the language or symbols associated with kiddushin ("holy union" in Hebrew and the legal term for marriage) as the term is gender-specific. Some synagogues within Conservative Judaism still reject recognition of same-sex unions as marriages, but permit celebration of commitment ceremonies, in part as an expression of their belief that scripture requires monogamy of all sexually active couples.

=== Reform Judaism ===
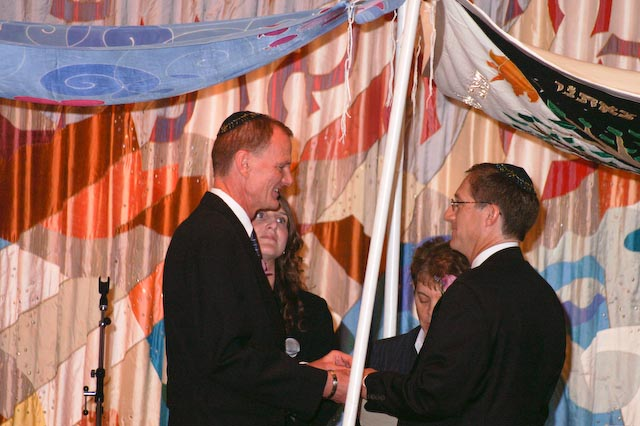
Ed and Eddie under the huppah, (2008)

An ad hoc committee of the Central Conference of American Rabbis (CCAR) has declared same-sex relationships worthy of affirmation through Jewish ritual, but leaves it up to individual rabbis whether to officiate such rituals.

In 1996 the CCAR passed a resolution approving same-sex civil marriage. However, it made a distinction between civil marriages and religious marriages, stating, "However we may understand homosexuality, whether as an illness, as a genetically based dysfunction or as sexual preference and lifestyle—we cannot accommodate the relationship of two homosexuals as a 'marriage' within the context of Judaism, for none of the elements of qiddushin (sanctification) normally associated with marriage can be invoked for this relationship." The CCAR supported the right of gay and lesbian couples to share fully and equally in the rights of civil marriage and opposed governmental efforts to ban gay and lesbian marriage, stating, "this is a matter of civil law and is separate from the question of rabbinic officiation at such marriages."

In 1997 the General Assembly of the Union for Reform Judaism (formerly known as the Union of American Hebrew Congregations) passed a resolution supporting secular efforts to promote legislation which would provide through civil marriage equal opportunity for gay men and lesbians; encouraging its constituent congregations to honor monogamous domestic relationships formed by gay men or lesbians; and supporting the efforts of the CCAR "in its ongoing work as it studies the appropriateness of religious ceremonies for use in a celebration of commitment recognizing a monogamous domestic relationship between two Jewish gay men or two Jewish lesbians."

In 1998, an ad hoc CCAR committee on Human Sexuality issued its majority report (11 to 1, 1 abstention), which stated that the holiness within a Jewish marriage "may be present in committed same-gender relationships between two Jews and that these relationships can serve as the foundation of stable Jewish families, thus adding strength to the Jewish community". The report called for the CCAR to support rabbis in officiating at same-sex marriages. Also in 1998, the Responsa Committee of the CCAR issued a lengthy teshuvah (rabbinical opinion) that offered detailed argumentation in support of both sides of the question whether a rabbi may officiate at a commitment ceremony for a same-sex couple.

In March 2000 the CCAR issued a new resolution stating, "We do hereby resolve that the relationship of a Jewish, same-gender couple is worthy of affirmation through appropriate Jewish ritual and further resolve, that we recognize the diversity of opinions within our ranks on this issue. We support the decision of those who choose to officiate at rituals of union for same-sex couples, and we support the decision of those who do not."

Also in 2000, Hebrew Union College-Jewish Institute of Religion, the Reform seminary, established the Institute for Judaism, Sexual Orientation & Gender Identity to "educate HUC-JIR students on lesbian, gay, bisexual and transgender issues to help them challenge and eliminate homophobia and heterosexism; and to learn tools to be able to transform the communities they encounter into ones that are inclusive and welcoming of LGBT Jews".

In 2003, the Union for Reform Judaism retroactively applied its pro-rights policy on gays and lesbians to the bisexual and transgender communities, issuing a resolution titled, "Support for the Inclusion and Acceptance of the Transgender and Bisexual Communities".

Also in 2003, Women of Reform Judaism issued a statement describing its support for human and civil rights and the struggles of the bisexual and transgender communities: "Women of Reform Judaism accordingly: Calls for civil rights protections from all forms of discrimination against bisexual and transgender individuals; Urges that such legislation allows transgender individuals to be seen under the law as the gender by which they identify; and Calls upon sisterhoods to hold informative programs about the transgender and bisexual communities."

In 2009 Siddur Sha'ar Zahav, a prayer book intended for LGBTQ as well as straight Jews, was published. Sha'ar Zahav is a progressive Reform synagogue in San Francisco.

In 2014, the CCAR joined a lawsuit challenging North Carolina's ban on same-sex marriage, which is America's first faith-based challenge to same-sex marriage bans.

In 2015 the High Holy Day Reform prayer book Mishkan HaNefesh ("sanctuary of the soul") replaced a line from the Reform movement's earlier prayer book, Gates of Repentance, mentioning the joy of a bride and groom with "rejoicing with couples under the chuppah [wedding canopy]." It also added a non-gendered option to the way worshipers are called to the Torah, offering "mibeit", Hebrew for "from the house of", to the traditional options: "son of" or "daughter of".

=== Reconstructionist Judaism ===
As of 1992 with the Report of the Reconstructionist Commission on Homosexuality, the Reconstructionist Movement of Judaism has expressed its support for same-sex marriages as well as the inclusion of gay and lesbian people in all aspects of Jewish life. The Jewish Reconstructionist Federation leaves the choice of whether or not to perform same-sex marriages to individual rabbis but the procedure is included in the Reconstructionist Rabbi's Manual and many choose to use the traditional language and symbols of kiddushin.

== Public opinion ==
Among American religious groups in a 2013 Pew Research Center survey, Jews were the most in favor of allowing same-sex marriages, at 83% (+/− 11%). A 2013 poll by Haaretz showed support among Israelis (including Arabs) for same-sex marriage at 59%, with secular and traditional Jews particularly supportive and Haredi Jews firmly opposed.

== See also ==
- Sexuality and Judaism
- Homosexuality and Judaism
- Timeline of LGBT Jewish history
- LGBT clergy in Judaism
- Transgender people and Judaism
- LGBT rights in Israel
- Jewish LGBT organizations
- List of LGBT Jews
