= LGBTQ-affirming denominations in Judaism =

Jewish LGBTQ flag in Tel Aviv, Israel.

The LGBTQ affirming denominations in Judaism are denominations that affirm same-sex relationships are theologically and morally compatible with the Jewish faith, or that leave it up to each synagogue to determine its position on the subject. These denominations may have statements that support the ordination of LGBTQ rabbis, the blessing of same-sex unions or the same-sex marriages.

== Characteristics ==
Jewish affirming denominations generally have one or more of the following statements about LGBTQ people, or leave it up to each synagogue to determine its position on the subject:

1. Ordination of LGBTQ rabbis
2. Blessing of same-sex unions
3. Same-sex marriages

== International ==
Country	Denomination	Ordination of LGBTQ rabbis	Blessing of same-sex unions	Same-sex marriages	Decisions left to synagogues
6 countries	Alliance for Jewish Renewal	Yes Since 2000	Yes Since 2000	Yes Since 2000	Yes
7 countries	Reconstructing Judaism	Yes Since 1984	Yes Since 1993	Yes Since 1993	Yes
International	World Council of Synagogues	Yes Since 2006	Yes Since 2006	Yes Since 2012	Yes

== Africa ==
Country	Denomination	Ordination of LGBTQ rabbis	Blessing of same-sex unions	Same-sex marriages	Decisions left to synagogues
South Africa	South African Union for Progressive Judaism	Yes	Yes	Yes Since 2007	Yes

== North America ==
Country	Denomination	Ordination of LGBTQ rabbis	Blessing of same-sex unions	Same-sex marriages	Decisions left to synagogues
Canada and United States	Alliance for Jewish Renewal	Yes Since 2000	Yes Since 2000	Yes Since 2000	Yes
Canada and United States	Union for Reform Judaism	Yes Since 1990	Yes Since 2000	Yes Since 2000	Yes
Canada and United States	Reconstructing Judaism	Yes Since 1984	Yes Since 1993	Yes Since 1993	Yes
United States	Society for Humanistic Judaism	Yes Since 2004	Yes Since 2004	Yes Since 2004	Yes

== South America ==
Country	Denomination	Ordination of LGBTQ rabbis	Blessing of same-sex unions	Same-sex marriages	Decisions left to synagogues
Brazil and Curaçao	Reconstructing Judaism	Yes Since 1984	Yes Since 1993	Yes Since 1993	Yes

== Europe ==
Country	Denomination	Ordination of LGBTQ rabbis	Blessing of same-sex unions	Same-sex marriages	Decisions left to synagogues
Germany and United Kingdom	Alliance for Jewish Renewal	Yes Since 2000	Yes Since 2000	Yes Since 2000	Yes
Germany, Italy and Netherlands	Reconstructing Judaism	Yes Since 1984	Yes Since 1993	Yes Since 1993	Yes
United Kingdom	Progressive Judaism (United Kingdom)	Yes Since 2005	Yes Since 2005	Yes Since 2012	Yes

== Oceania and Asia ==
Country	Denomination	Ordination of LGBTQ rabbis	Blessing of same-sex unions	Same-sex marriages	Decisions left to synagogues
Australia and South Korea	Alliance for Jewish Renewal	Yes Since 2000	Yes Since 2000	Yes Since 2000	Yes
Australia, New Zealand and Asia	Union for Progressive Judaism	Yes Since 2007	Yes Since 2007	Yes Since 2011	Yes

== Organizations not recognized by their denominations ==
Country	Denomination	Organization	Ordination of LGBTQ rabbis	Blessing of same-sex unions	Same-sex marriages
Israel	Orthodox Judaism	Hod	Yes	Yes	No
Israel	Orthodox Judaism	Bat Kol	Yes	Yes	No

== Organizations not affiliated with any particular denomination ==
Country	Organization	Ordination of LGBTQ rabbis	Blessing of same-sex unions	Same-sex marriages
International	World Congress of LGBTQ+ Jews	Yes	Yes	Yes

== See also ==
- Sexuality and Judaism
- Homosexuality and Judaism
- Timeline of LGBT Jewish history
- LGBT clergy in Judaism
- Same-sex marriage and Judaism
- Transgender people and Judaism
- LGBT rights in Israel
- Jewish LGBT organizations
- List of LGBT Jews
