= List of Jewish LGBTQ organizations =

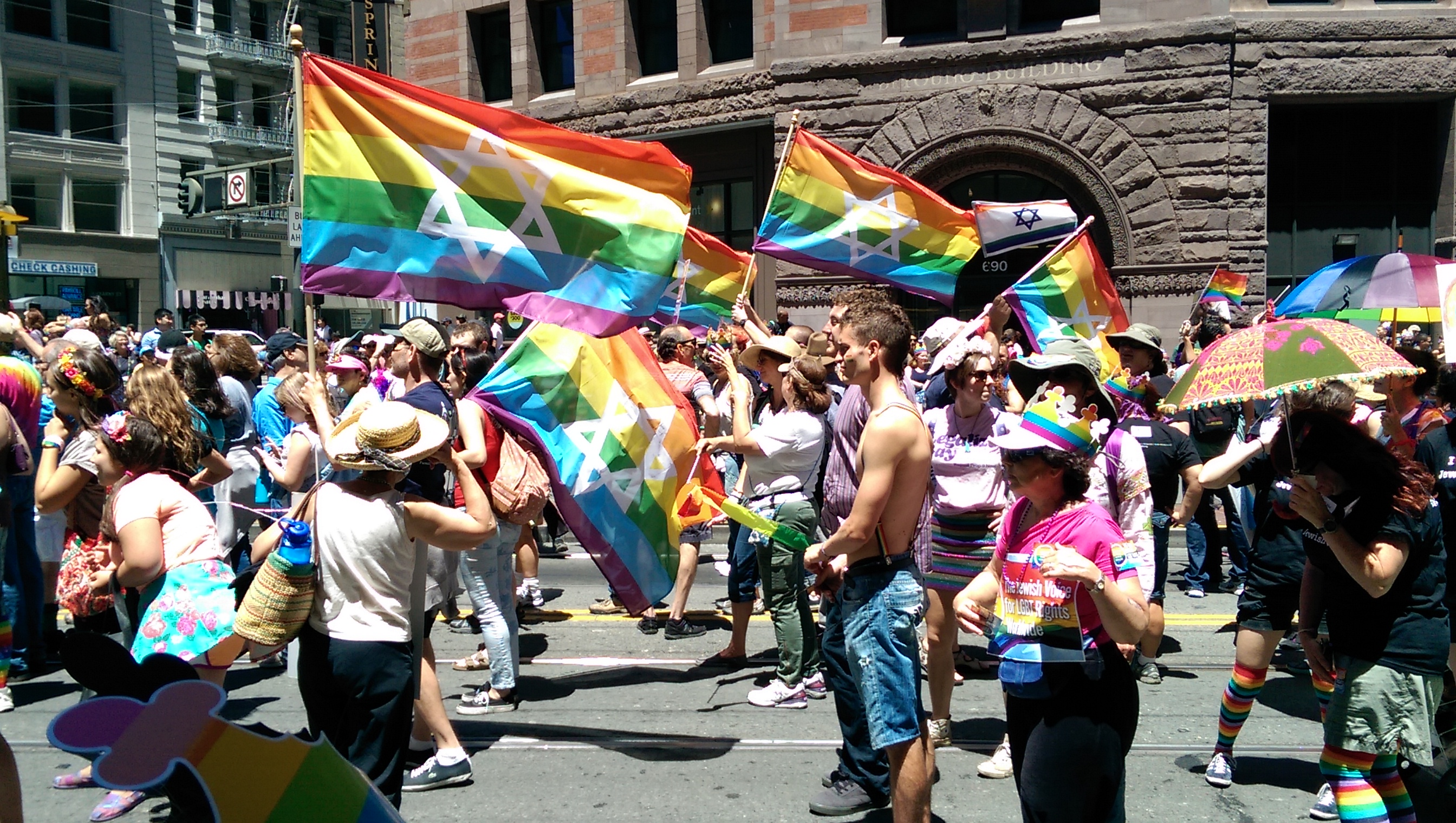
Jewish marchers at San Francisco Pride 2014

Jewish LGBTQ+ organizations are organizations, communities, and support groups which focus on creating a more LGBTQ-inclusive environment within Judaism.

These organizations provide a range of resources and support services, including community-building events, educational programs, advocacy initiatives, and counseling services.

== International ==
- World Congress of LGBTQ+ Jews - Keshet Ga’avah was formed in 1975 and has around 50 member organizations worldwide.

== North America ==
=== Canada ===
- Ga'ava גאווה, the organized Jewish community’s LGBTQ+ Advisory Committee (Quebec) - Based in Montréal, Québec, Canada, since 2007, Ga'ava גאווה advises the organized Jewish community on LGBTQ+ issues and represents the Jewish community to the greater Québec LGBTQIA2+ community.
- Gay and Lesbian Orthodox Jews - A website for LGBTQ individuals who are members of the Jewish Orthodox community. The website features discussion of religious scriptures, as well as comments from Orthodox Rabbis about the intersection of Judaism and sexuality.

=== United States ===
- Eshel - Founded in June 2010 with a mission to build community and acceptance for Jewish LGBTQ individuals and their families in Orthodox communities, Eshel trains its members to act as advocates for LGBTQ Orthodox Jewish people and their families. It was founded in 2010.
- The Institute for Judaism and Sexual Orientation - The Institute for Judaism, Sexual Orientation & Gender Identity at Hebrew Union College-Jewish Institute of Religion (HUC-JIR) was founded in 2000 and is the only one of its kind in the Jewish world. Its goal is to educate HUC-JIR students on LGBTQ issues, to help them challenge and eradicate homophobia and heterosexism; and to learn resources to be able to transform the communities they encounter into ones that are welcoming and inclusive of LGBTQ Jews.
- JQY - A nonprofit organization and support group for Orthodox and formerly Orthodox LGBTQ youth. The website has a number of personal stories, videos, and a comprehensive list of resources for young people, their parents, families, and allies.
- Keshet - A grassroots organization which works to establish equality and inclusion of LGBTQ Jewish people in Jewish life. It is led and supported by LGBTQ Jewish people and straight allies. Keshet's goal is to cultivate the spirit and practice of inclusion in all parts of the Jewish community.
- The Jewish LGBTQ Donor Network - The Jewish LGBTQ Donor Network was founded in 2021 to build a new, global community of like-minded individuals who come together to explore philanthropic opportunities in the Jewish LGBTQ space and to translate that learning into collective action to enhance the lives of LGBTQ Jews.
- SOJOURN - The Southern Jewish Resource Network for Gender & Sexual Diversity is the Southern America's resource for Jewish and LGBTQ programming, education, support, and advocacy. Its mission is to advance LGBTQ affirmation and empowerment across the South.
- SVARA - A Jewish text research academy devoted to the study of the Talmud. It is open to all individuals, including from other religious traditions, who wish to participate. SVARA specifically acknowledges the wisdom and contribution to the changing Jewish culture that LGBTQ Jewish people and their allies can bring.
- GLYDSA: The Gay and Lesbian Yeshiva Day School Alumni Association - Established in 1995. Its mission is to build a community for LGBTQ Jewish people, from Orthodox or traditional backgrounds, and to integrate their Jewish and gay identities, in a self-affirming, confidential manner, through social events and other activities.

=== Mexico ===
- Guimel

== South America ==
=== Argentina ===
- Judíos Argentinos LGBTIQ+

== Israel ==
- A Wider Bridge - Seeks to inspire LGBTQ Jewish people to deepen their Jewish identity through connection with Israel and to develop stronger connections between the LGBTQ communities in Israel and North America.
- Bat-Kol - A religious lesbian organisation founded in Israel to allow women to fulfill both their religious and lesbian identities, and to make it possible for women to live in loving relationships, to raise children without deception, while staying committed to religion.
- Havruta - Offers social support networks for religious LGBTQ people in Israel. Beyond being a safe haven, Havruta actively works to inform and educate the religious public about LGBTQ issues in their communities.
- HOD - An organization for religious homosexual Jews, providing a platform for open-minded discussion in order to promote awareness of being gay and Orthodox.
- Jerusalem Open House - The Jerusalem Open House for Pride and Tolerance is a leading organization of LGBTQ people and their allies in Jerusalem. As a grassroot, activist community center, JOH provides services to all LGBTQ individuals in Jerusalem and surrounding communities, while working to secure LGBTQ rights in Israeli society at large.

== Europe ==
=== France ===
- Beit Haverim - an organization for LGBTQ Jewish people founded in 1977.

=== Germany ===
- Keshet Deutschland - founded in Berlin in 2018, to support visibility for Jewish members of the LGBTQ community.

=== Netherlands ===
- JPride Amsterdam - founded in Amsterdam in 2018 as a social and gathering space for LGBTQ+ Jews.

=== United Kingdom ===
- KeshetUK - a British member organization of Keshet. It was established with the mission of promoting the inclusion of Jewish LGBTQ individuals and their families within all aspects of Jewish life in the UK. The organization primarily focuses on education and training initiatives to achieve its goal.
- The Jewish LGBT+ Group (formerly JGLG)
- A social group for Gay Jews in London
- Laviot
- Pink Peacock, a queer Yiddish anarchist café in Glasgow
- Rainbow Jews - A history project showcasing the heritage of Jewish Lesbian, Gay, Bisexual and Transgender people in the UK from the 1950s to today.

== Oceania ==
=== Australia ===
- Aleph

== See also ==
- LGBT-affirming denominations in Judaism
- LGBT clergy in Judaism
- Timeline of LGBT Jewish history
- Judaism and sexuality
- Same-sex marriage and Judaism
- Homosexuality and Judaism
- List of LGBT Jews
- LGBT rights in Israel
