= Transgender people and religion =

The relationship between transgender people and religion varies widely around the world. Religions range from condemning any gender variance to honoring transgender people as religious leaders. Views within a single religion can vary considerably, as can views between different faiths.

This article includes a wide overview of documented beliefs and opinions held within various sects of mainstream religions, both on a large scale (i.e. statements made by the Pope on behalf of the entire Catholic Church) and on a small scale (i.e. a church accepting a transgender pastor).

== Abrahamic religions ==
Abrahamic religions (namely Judaism, Samaritanism, Christianity, the Baháʼí Faith, and Islam) have traditionally affirmed and endorsed a patriarchal and heteronormative approach towards human sexuality, but the usage of the term "Abrahamic religions" to group together these fundamentally different spiritual communities has been debated in efficacy, particularly by religious studies academics, as it leads to sweeping generalizations about peoples' beliefs. Each individual religious person, even under the umbrella of a specific sect, can have vastly different understandings and beliefs about non-normative gender expression and identity.

=== Baháʼí Faith ===
In the Baháʼí Faith, transgender people can gain recognition in their gender if they have medically transitioned under the direction of medical professionals and if they have Gender-affirming surgery (i.e. Sexual Reassignment Surgery or SRS). After SRS, they are considered transitioned and may have a Baháʼí marriage. Little has been published on the topic by top leaders of the faith as of 2021.

=== Christianity ===
Some Christian denominations have been known to accept transgender people as members and clergy:

- In 2003, the United Church of Christ General Synod called for full inclusion of transgender persons.
- In 2005, Sarah Jones became the first openly transgender person to be ordained by the Church of England as a priest: the first trans person to minister in the Church of England was Carol Stone, who had been ordained in 1978 and transitioned in 2000.
- In 2008, the United Methodist Church Judicial Council ruled that openly transgender pastor Drew Phoenix could keep his position. At the UMC General Conference the same year, several petitions that would have forbidden transgender clergy and added anti-transgender language to the Book of Discipline were rejected. In 2017, the United Methodist Church commissioned its first non-binary clergy member, a transgender non-binary deacon named M Barclay. Also, Joy Everingham was the Methodist Church in Great Britain's first openly transgender minister.
- In 2009, the United Church of Canada affirmed the participation and ministry of transgender people, and encouraged all congregations to welcome transgender people into membership, ministry, and full participation. In 2010, The Rev. Cindy Bourgeoisis the first openly transgender person ordained in the United Church of Canada.
- In 2012, the Episcopal Church in the United States approved a change to their nondiscrimination canons to include gender identity and expression.
- In 2013, Shannon Kearns became the first openly transgender person ordained by the North American Old Catholic Church. He was ordained in Minneapolis.
- In 2014, Megan Rohrer became the first openly transgender leader of a Lutheran congregation (specifically, Grace Evangelical Lutheran Church of San Francisco).
- In 2017, the General Synod of the Church of England passed a motion stating, "That this Synod, recognising the need for transgender people to be welcomed and affirmed in their parish church, call on the House of Bishops to consider whether some nationally commended liturgical materials might be prepared to mark a person's gender transition."

==== Catholic Church ====
The Catechism of the Catholic Church, promulgated in 1992, does not mention transgender issues directly. In 2000, the Catholic Congregation for the Doctrine of the Faith sent a confidential document to church leaders reportedly stating that gender-affirming surgeries do not alter a person's gender in the eyes of the Church. The document reportedly concludes that such an operation could be morally acceptable in certain cases of medical necessity, but that persons who have undergone GAS could not validly marry. In a Christmas 2008 address, Pope Benedict XVI denounced the concept of gender, arguing that it comprised living against "truth" and "the creating Spirit" and could lead to the "self-destruction" of the human race. "What is often expressed and understood by the term 'gender,' is definitively resolved in the self-emancipation of the human being from creation and the Creator... Man wants to create himself, and to decide always and exclusively on his own about what concerns him."

In 2015, in response to a transgender man's query, the Vatican declared that transgender Catholics were prohibited from becoming godparents, stating that transgender status "reveals in a public way an attitude opposite to the moral imperative of solving the problem of sexual identity according to the truth of one's own sexuality" and that, "it is evident that this person does not possess the requirement of leading a life according to the faith and in the position of godfather and is therefore unable to be admitted to the position of godfather or godmother." In 2016, Pope Francis stated that "biological sex and the socio-cultural role of sex (gender) can be distinguished but not separated".

In 2023, a document from the Dicastery for the Doctrine of the Faith within the Roman Curia, responding to questions from José Negri, Bishop of Santo Amaro, stated that transgender people could be baptised, could be godparents at a baptism, and could be witnesses at weddings, so long as such situations would not cause scandal.

Individual Catholics have held a range of positions regarding transgender issues. Apologist Tim Staples has stated that experiencing gender dysphoria is not sinful but surgeries such as sex reassignment surgery are morally impermissible. Theologian James Whitehead has said, "The kind of transition that trans people are talking about is very similar to the journey of faith through darkness and desert that people have been making for thousands of years."

==== Baptist ====
In 2006, Albert Mohler, then president of the Southern Baptist Theological Seminary, said "Only God has the right to determine gender", adding, "any attempt to alter that creation is an act of rebellion against God." He also stated, "Christians are obligated to find our definitions ... in the Bible. What the activists want to call 'sex-reassignment surgery' must be seen as a form of bodily mutilation rather than gender correction. The chromosomes will continue to tell the story...Gender is not under our control after all. When a nation's moral rebellion comes down to this level of confusion, we are already in big trouble. A society that can't distinguish between men and women is not likely to find moral clarity in any other area of life." In 2014, the Southern Baptist Convention approved a resolution at its annual meeting stating that "God's design was the creation of two distinct and complementary sexes, male and female" and that "gender identity is determined by biological sex, not by one's self-perception". Furthermore, the resolution opposes hormone therapy, transition-related care, and anything else that would "alter one's bodily identity", as well as opposing government efforts to "validate transgender identity as morally praiseworthy". Instead, the resolution asks transgender people to "trust in Christ and to experience renewal in the Gospel".

==== Church of Jesus Christ of Latter-day Saints ====
In Mormonism's largest denominations, the Church of Jesus Christ of Latter-day Saints (LDS Church), socially or medically transitioned transgender people are not allowed to join the church via baptism, as of 2024. Transgender members will receive an annotation on their membership record which groups them with violent sexual predators and child abusers, and bars them from working with children or teaching church classes. Rituals (called ordinances) such as receiving the priesthood and temple endowments, are only done according to birth sex. Undergoing gender-affirming surgery may imperil the membership of an LDS Church member.

==== Unitarian Universalism ====
Unitarian Universalism, a liberal religion with roots in liberal Christianity, became the first denomination to accept openly transgender people as full members with eligibility to become clergy (in 1979), and the first to open an Office of Bisexual, Gay, Lesbian, and Transgender Concerns (in 1973). In 1988 the first openly transgender person was ordained by the Unitarian Universalist Association. In 2002 Rev. Sean Dennison became the first openly transgender person in the Unitarian Universalist ministry called to serve a congregation; he was called to South Valley UU Society, Salt Lake City, Utah. Also in 2017, the Unitarian Universalist Association's General Assembly voted to create inclusive wordings for non-binary, genderqueer, gender fluid, agender, intersex, two-spirit and polygender people, replacing the words "men and women" with the word "people." Of the six sources of the living tradition, the second source of faith, as documented in the bylaws of the denomination, now includes "Words and deeds of prophetic people which challenge us to confront powers and structures of evil with justice, compassion, and the transforming power of love".

=== Islam ===
In Islamic literature, the Classical Arabic term mukhannathun is used to describe "effeminate men". The term has sometimes been equated to transgender women, gay men, members of a third gender, or intersex individuals, although it does not neatly fit into any of those categories.

The treatment of mukhannathun varied throughout early Islamic history, and the meaning of the term took on new dimensions over time. In some eras, men deemed mukhannathun were persecuted and castrated, while in others they were celebrated as musicians and entertainers. According to Tabari, one of the earliest authors on the meaning of the Quran, narrates that Muhammad did not forbid the mukhannatun to enter women's quarters until they started to describe the women in great detail to men. In the late medieval era, several Islamic scholars held that mukhannathun who had innate feminine mannerisms were not blameworthy as long as they did not violate Islamic religious laws concerning sexual morality. In later years, the term came to be associated with the receptive partner in gay sexual practices, as homosexuality was seen as an extension of effeminacy.

In the late 1980s, Mufti Muhammad Sayyid Tantawy of Egypt issued a fatwa supporting the right for those who fit the description of mukhannathun to have sex reassignment surgery; Tantawy seems to have associated the mukhannathun with the concept of hermaphroditism or intersex individuals. Ayatollah Khomeini of Iran issued similar fatwas around the same time. Khomeini's initial fatwa concerned intersex individuals as well, but he later specified that sex reassignment surgery was also permissible in the case of transgender individuals. Because homosexuality is illegal in Iran but identifying as a trans person is legal, some gay individuals have been forced to undergo sex reassignment surgery and transition into the opposite sex, regardless of their actual gender identity. Due to Khomeini's fatwas allowing sex reassignment surgery for intersex and transgender individuals, it is sanctioned as a supposed "cure" for homosexuality, which is punishable by death penalty under Iranian law. The Iranian government even provides up to half the cost for those needing financial assistance and a sex change is recognised on the birth certificate.

In some regions of South Asia such as India, Bangladesh, and Pakistan, the hijras are officially recognized as a third gender that is neither male nor female, a concept that some have compared to mukhannathun. Transgender Muslims may encounter multiple forms of minority stress as a religious minority, gender minority, and often as immigrant and ethnic minorities as well. Etengoff & Rodriguez (2020) conducted an explanatory study with 15 transgender Muslims and found that although 14 of the 15 participants spoke of coming-out challenges, the average depression scores for the sample were moderate and self-esteem scores were within the normal range. In addition, qualitative analysis suggested that 8 of the 15 participants used religion and spirituality as important coping tools (e.g., Allah, Quran, liberation theology). This research offers an applied intersectional, positive growth framework for the study of transgender individuals' gender and Muslim identity experiences.

=== Judaism ===
Jewish LGBTQ pride flag

Jewish views of transgender people have varied by time and denomination. Reform and Reconstructionist groups have expressed positive views, Orthodox and Hasidic have expressed negative views, and Conservative groups have expressed more of a mixed view.

==== Rabbinic texts ====
Rabbinic Jewish texts discuss six sex/gender categories.

The term saris (סָרִיס), generally translated to English as "eunuch" or "chamberlain", appears 45 times in the Tanakh. It frequently refers to a trusted but gender-variant person who was delegated authority by a powerful person. It is unclear whether most were in fact castrated. In Isaiah 56, God promises eunuchs who keep the Sabbath and hold fast to his covenant that he will build an especially good monument in heaven for them, to make up for their childlessness.

Tumtum (טומטום in Hebrew, meaning "hidden") is a term that appears in Jewish Rabbinic literature and usually refers to a person whose sex is unknown, because their genitalia are covered or "hidden". A tumtum is not defined as a separate gender, but rather a state of doubt.

Androgynos (אנדרוגינוס in Hebrew, translation "intersex") refers to someone who possesses both male and female sexual characteristics. The nature of the individual's gender is ambiguous.

The concept is also briefly referenced in Shulhan Aruch and mystical texts such as Kabbalah, that at times, a female soul may reside in a male body, and vice-versa, although this is not formally identified as transgender in the modern sense.

==== Orthodox Judaism ====
Orthodox Jewish religious authorities assert that gender is an innate and eternal category which is based on verses in the Book of Genesis about Adam and Eve and the creation of maleness and femaleness. The removal of genital organs is forbidden on the basis of the prohibition against "anything which is mauled, crushed, torn or cut" (Leviticus 22:24). A further prohibition in Deuteronomy 22:5 proscribes not only cross-dressing but any action uniquely identified with the opposite sex, and this would also apply to an operation to transform sexual characteristics.

Despite the religious-legal challenges presented by transgender Jews, some Orthodox rabbis recognize the high rates of suicide attempts among transgender Orthodox Jews and advocate for steps to reduce the risks of mental illness and community rejection. There have been several organizations founded to support LGBTQ Orthodox Jews, such as Eshel and JQY. Orthodox Union senior policy director Rabbi Tzvi Hersh Weinreb has spoken publicly since 2016 about the need to support transgender Orthodox Jews and their families with compassion.

==== Hasidic Judaism ====
Currently, Hasidic Judaism makes no place for trans people, because everything in the community is determined by gender roles. Most Hasidic Jews are barely aware of trans people, and the topic is never discussed altogether. The first person to come out as trans in a Hasidic community was trans activist and writer Abby Stein, who is also a direct descendant of Hasidic Judaism's founder the Baal Shem Tov. When Stein came out she was shunned by her family, and received much scorn from the Hasidic community.

==== Conservative Judaism ====
Conservative Judaism has mixed views on transgender people. In 2003, the Committee on Jewish Law and Standards approved a rabbinic ruling that concluded that sex reassignment surgery (SRS) is permissible as a treatment of gender dysphoria, and that a transgender person's sex status under Jewish law is changed by SRS. There have not yet been any openly transgender rabbis or rabbinical students affiliated with Conservative Judaism. But the Jewish Theological Seminary, one of three Conservative movement schools, openly admits students of all sexual orientations and gender identities for rabbinical training and ordination. Also, Emily Aviva Kapor, who had been ordained privately by a "Conservadox" rabbi in 2005, came out in 2012, thus becoming the first openly transgender female rabbi in all of Judaism. In 2016 the Rabbinical Assembly, which is the international association of Conservative rabbis, passed a "Resolution Affirming the Rights of Transgender and Gender Non-Conforming People". In 2022 the Committee on Jewish Law and Standards approved a ruling authorizing non-gendered language for the aliyah, and the honors of the hagbah (lifting the Torah) and the gelilah (rolling up the Torah). The ruling also includes non-gendered language for calling up Cohens and Levis (descendants of the tribe of Levi) as well as how to address people without gendered language during the prayer Mi Shebeirach. This was a codification of a practice that already existed in places Jewish transgender people led.

==== Reform Judaism ====
Reform Judaism has expressed positive views on transgender people. Reform Judaism's Central Conference of American Rabbis first addressed the issue of transgender Jews in 1978, when they deemed it permissible for a person who has undergone sex reassignment surgery (SRS) to be married according to Jewish tradition. In 1990, the Central Conference of American Rabbis declared that people who have undergone sex reassignment surgery (SRS) may convert to Judaism. In 2002 at the Reform seminary Hebrew Union College-Jewish Institute of Religion in New York, Rabbi Margaret Wenig organized the first school-wide seminar at any rabbinical school which addressed the psychological, legal, and religious issues affecting people who are transgender or intersex. In 2003 Reuben Zellman became the first openly transgender person accepted to Hebrew Union College-Jewish Institute of Religion; he was ordained there in 2010. Also in 2003, the Union for Reform Judaism retroactively applied its pro-rights policy on gays and lesbians to the transgender and bisexual communities, issuing a resolution titled, "Support for the Inclusion and Acceptance of the Transgender and Bisexual Communities." Also in 2003, Women of Reform Judaism issued a statement describing their support for human and civil rights and the struggles of the transgender and bisexual communities, and saying, "Women of Reform Judaism accordingly: Calls for civil rights protections from all forms of discrimination against bisexual and transgender individuals; Urges that such legislation allows transgender individuals to be seen under the law as the gender by which they identify; and calls upon sisterhoods to hold informative programs about the transgender and bisexual communities." In 2006 Elliot Kukla, who had come out as transgender six months before his ordination, became the first openly transgender person to be ordained by the Hebrew Union College-Jewish Institute of Religion. In 2007, the Union for Reform Judaism issued a new edition of Kulanu, their resource manual for gay, lesbian, bisexual and transgender inclusion, which for the first time included a blessing sanctifying the sex-change process. It was written by Elliot Kukla at the request of a friend of his who was transgender. Also in 2007, David Saperstein of the Religious Action Center called for a trans-inclusive Employment Non-Discrimination Act. In 2015, the Union for Reform Judaism passed a "Resolution on the Rights of Transgender and Gender Non-Conforming People" with nine points calling for securing and defending the rights of transgender and gender non-confirming people to respectful and equitable treatment and affirming its own commitment to continued pursuit of same.

==== Reconstructionist Judaism ====
Reconstructionist Judaism has expressed positive views on transgender people. In 2003 the Reform rabbi Margaret Wenig organized the first school-wide seminar at the Reconstructionist Rabbinical College which addressed the psychological, legal and religious issues affecting people who are transgender or intersex. In 2013 the Reconstructionist Rabbinical Association issued a resolution stating in part, "Therefore be it resolved that the RRA [Reconstructionist Rabbinical Association] directs its executive director and board to move forward, in cooperation with the RRC [Reconstructionist Rabbinical College] and all relevant associated entities, in educating RRA members about issues of gender identity, to urge the Reconstructionist movement to similarly educate its constituency and to adopt policies that will do all that is possible to provide full employment opportunities for transgender and gender nonconforming rabbis, and to explore how the Reconstructionist movement can best influence the wider Jewish and non-Jewish world to [be] welcoming and inclusive of all people, regardless of gender identity." In 2017, the Reconstructionist Rabbinical Association approved a resolution committing themselves to work for "full inclusion, acceptance, appreciation, celebration and welcome of people of all gender identities in Jewish life and in society at large"; the resolution also "strongly advocates for the full equality of transgender, non-binary, and gender non-conforming people and for equal protections for people of all gender identities under the law, at all levels of government, in North America and Israel."

==== Other ====
In 1998, after she won the Eurovision song competition, a serious religious debate was held as to whether, and how, Dana International (a transgender woman) should pray in a synagogue. One rabbinical authority concluded that Dana should be counted in a minyan as a man, but could not sing in front of the community since she was also a woman, according to the rabbi, and that would violate the Orthodox rule of kol isha.

In January 2015, a transgender Jewish woman, Kay Long, was denied access to the Western Wall, first by the women's section and then by the men's section. Long's presence was prevented by "modesty police" at women's section who are not associated with the rabbi of the Western Wall or the site administration. They are a group of female volunteers who guard the entrance to the women's section preventing entry to visitors who are not dressed to their idea of Orthodox modesty standards for women. The director of Jerusalem's Open House, a community centre for the lesbian, gay, bisexual and transgender community, noted that Long's experience was not unique. "Gender separation at the Western Wall is harmful for transgender people. This is not the first story that we know of with transgender religious people that wanted to go to the Western Wall and pray and couldn't," said Elinor Sidi, who expected that the battle for access to the Western Wall for the LGBTQ community would be a long and difficult one. It was later asserted that Kay Long would have been permitted in the women's section except for her clothing. "It was not an issue of her gender, but the way she was dressed."

Several non-denominational Jewish groups provide resources for transgender people. Hillel: The Foundation for Jewish Campus Life published an LGBTQ Resource Guide in 2007. Jewish Mosaic has published interpretations of Jewish texts that affirm transgender identities. Keshet, an LGBTQ Jewish advocacy group, has assisted American Jewish day schools with properly accommodating transgender students.

== Australian Aboriginal ==
The Rainbow Serpent Ungud has been described as androgynous. Shaman identify their erect penises with Ungud, and his androgyny inspires some to undergo ceremonial penile subincision. Angamunggi is another Rainbow Serpent, worshipped as a "giver of life".

Other Australian mythological beings include Labarindja, blue-skinned wild women or "demon women" with hair the colour of smoke. Stories about them show them to be completely uninterested in romance or sex with men, and any man forcing his attention upon them could die, due to the "evil magic in their vaginas". They are sometimes depicted as gynandrous or intersex, having both a penis and a vagina. This is represented in rituals by having their part played by men in women's clothes.

== Classical myth ==
The patron god is Dionysus, a god gestated in the thigh of his father Zeus, after his mother died from being overwhelmed by Zeus's true form. Aphroditus was an androgynous Aphrodite from Cyprus with a religious cult in which worshipers cross-dressed, in later mythology became known as Hermaphroditus, the son of Hermes and Aphrodite who merged bodies with the water nymph Salmacis, transforming him into an androgynous being. In Phrygia there was Agdistis, a hermaphroditic being created when Zeus unwittingly impregnated Gaia. The gods feared Agdistis and Dionysus castrated her; she then became the goddess Cybele.

In addition, Norse gods were capable of changing gender at will, for example Loki frequently disguised himself as a woman and gave birth to a foal while in the form of a white mare after a sexual encounter with the stallion Svaðilfari.

Human fertility was a major aspect of Egyptian mythology, and was often entwined with the crop fertility provided by annual flooding of the river Nile. This connection was shown in iconography of Nile-gods, such as Hapi, god of the Nile, and Wadj-wer, god of the Nile Delta, who although male were depicted with female attributes such as pendulous breasts, symbolizing the fertility the river provides.

== Indian religions ==
=== Buddhism ===
There is no general consensus on views towards transgender people in Buddhism, as it has not been directly mentioned by Gautama Buddha or the Buddhist sutras. The 14th Dalai Lama himself has expressed conflicting views on the subject, having condemned violence against LGBTQ people and expressed interest in medical advancements for LGBTQ people, but has also stated in a 1997 interview that "from a Buddhist point of view [lesbian and gay sex] is generally considered sexual misconduct." There are highly varied views on the topic, most stemming from personal opinion. There are no official rules prohibiting transgender people from becoming bhikkhu, and the 2015 US Transgender Survey found that 6% of transgender Americans identify as Buddhist.

In Thai Buddhism, being kathoey (an umbrella term that roughly maps to a range of things from male-assigned transgender people to male homosexuality) is seen as being part of one's karma if it should be the case for a person. The response is one of "pity" rather than "blame". Kathoey are generally seen as not likely to form lasting relationships with men, and the lay explanation of their karma is that they are working out debts from adulterous behavior in past lives. In the past they disrupted marriages, and now they are doomed to never marry.

=== Hinduism ===
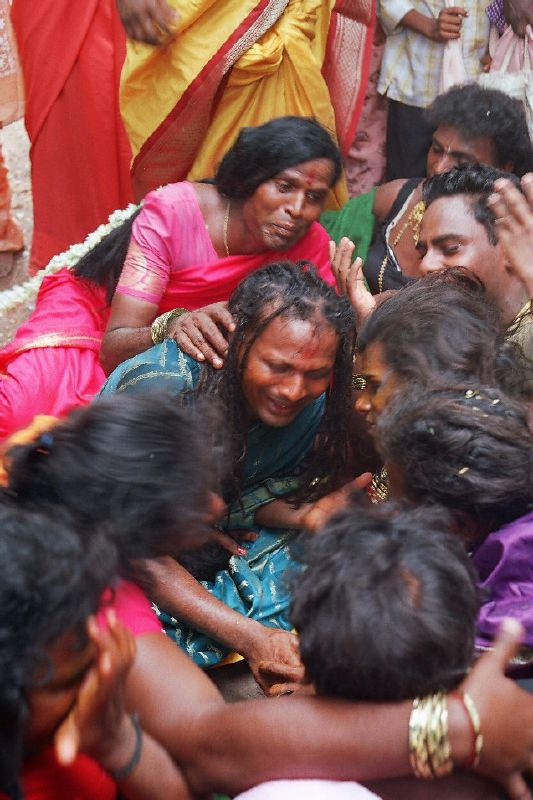
The Indian transgender Hijras or Aravanis – ritually marry the Hindu god Aravan and then mourn his ritual death (seen) in an 18-day festival in Koovagam, India.

Hindu philosophy has the concept of a third sex or third gender (tritiya-prakriti – literally, "third nature"). The people in this category of sex/gender are called Hijras in Hinduism. This category includes a wide range of people with mixed natures of gender and sex, such as homosexuals, transgender people, bisexuals, intersex people, and so on. Such persons were not considered fully male or female in traditional Hinduism, being a combination of both. They are mentioned as third sex by nature (birth) and were not expected to behave like ordinary men and women. Hijras identify themselves as incomplete men, that they do not have the desires (for women) that other men do. This lack of desire they attribute to a "defective organ." If a Hijra is not born with a "defective" organ (and most are not), they must make it so by emasculation. They often kept their own societies or town quarters, performed specific occupations (such as masseurs, hairdressers, flower-sellers, domestic servants, etc.) and were generally attributed a semi-divine status. Their participation in religious ceremonies, especially as crossdressing dancers and devotees of certain temple gods/goddesses, is considered auspicious in traditional Hinduism. Some Hindus believe that third-sex people have special powers allowing them to bless or curse others. However, these beliefs are not upheld in all divisions of Hinduism. In Hinduism, the universal creation is honored as unlimitedly diverse and the recognition of a third sex is simply one more aspect of this understanding.

==== In ancient Hindu society ====
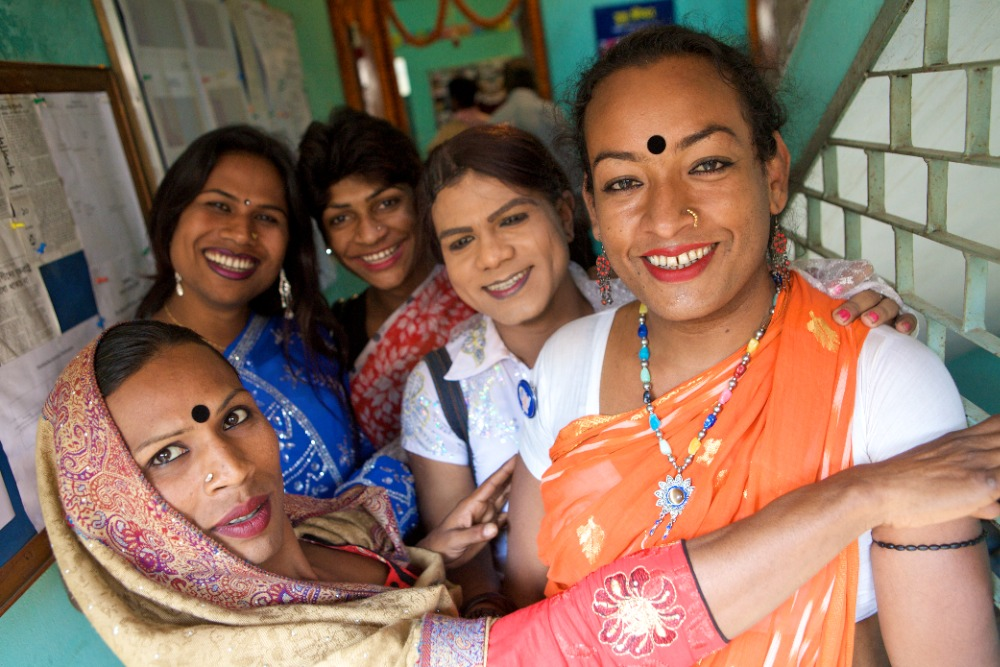
Hijra people in modern-day Bangladesh.

Within the Hindu context, Hijras have always been considered a part of the third gender diaspora, and hence the term Hijra, Transgender or Third gender will be used interchangeably.

Due to their classification as third gender and being sexually neutral, Transgender people, especially the devotees of Krishna, have been historically shown to bestow blessings. Being sexually neutral was considered especially auspicious in Vedic culture because the attraction between a man and woman was thought to create further attachments such as children due to procreation, and a home in terms of property, which would result in the living entities being entangled in samsara, the cycle of repeated birth and death.

The people of the third sex have had a prominent role in the arts and entertainment. Historically referred to as Nartaka, at the birth of a baby, Nartaka dancers would arrive, dance and sing the name of Krishna and bless the baby. As per custom, they were given precious jewelry and silks by the family of the baby for their contribution.

One more example of Transgender people being portrayed in Hindu history is that of Arjuna being depicted as Brihannala in the Mahabharata, who was a person of third gender. Brihanalla was shown to be an instructor singing and dancing in King Virata's court. But Arjuna/Brihanalla was first tested for his third-sex nature by assuring he had no lust for females, and would have been examined for testicles if he had been a eunuch. This is not the first example of the presence of a person of third gender in Hindu texts, but this example most pertains to the topic of third gender people and their auspiciousness.

== Neopagan religion ==
In most branches of Wicca, a person's status as trans- or cisgender is not considered an issue. Transgender people are generally magical people, according to Karla McLaren in her Energetic Boundaries study guide. Transgender people are almost always welcomed in individual communities, covens, study groups, and circles. Many transgender people were initially attracted to modern paganism because of this inclusion.

However, there are some Neopagan groups that do not welcome transgender people. In some cases, this is because of the emphasis on the union of male and female, and the exclusion of transgender individuals from such practices. Also, some gender separatist groups exclude transgender people, often on the basis that non-transgender individuals share certain spiritual qualities derived from assigned sex. Dianic Wicca is an example of such a separatist group.

== Japanese-Ryukyuan religions ==
Third gender characteristics contained in Shinto were gradually eliminated by the Meiji government's Westernization policy. For example, Ishiki Kaii Jōrei (違式詿違条例) ordinances, enacted in many prefectures in 1873, impose a fine of 10 sen on all cross-dressing. This led to the oppression of transgender people who "regularly cross-dressed."

Even after the Meiji period, androgynous symbolizations continued to be believed in unorthodox new sects that was sometimes deemed heretical by the imperial government.^{: 12―13} Some of the founders of these sects identified themselves as an androgynous gender. Nao Deguchi, the originator of Oomoto-kyō, in their later years claimed that their soul is the same as that of Amaterasu's sister, and therefore that although their body is female (i.e. 変性男子; Henjōnansi), they are spiritually male. Onisaburō Deguchi, dressed as a woman, was possessed by a god. The shintai worshipped by the Jikōson's sect, which arose after the war and was banned by Supreme Commander for the Allied Powers, is considered as an androgynous deity that was a fusion of Emperor Jimmu and Amaterasu. Sayo Kitamura, the founder of Tenshō Kōtai Jingū-kyō, claimed that the god residing in her was a single deity embodied by the male deity Kōtaijin (皇大神) and the female deity Amaterasu.^{: 15―16}

=== Japanese festivals ===
Cross-dressing has been a part of Japanese festivals (i.e. matsuri) at least since late ancient periods. Ueme (Japanese: 植女) was a woman who dressed as a man for the rice planting festival. An entry in 1129 in the Minamoto no Morotoki's Chōshūki records uemes planting seedlings in the rice fields during a rice-planting festival. Sanae Fukutō speculates that similar records in 1127 from Fujiwara no Munetada's Chūyūki also suggest cross-dressing may have been involved. Dengaku also involved cross-dressing. According to a record in the Sankaiki by Nakayama Tadachika, when Taira no Kiyomori visited Itsukushima Shrine in 1179, women dressed as men performed the dengaku dance in Fukuhara on the way. Furthermore, Ryōjin Hishō includes an imayō, which sings about women's cross-dressing. Sanae Fukutō speculates that this may also have been a woman cross-dressing for a festival.

このごろ都に流行る物、柳黛髪々似而非鬘しほゆき近江女女冠者、長刀持たぬ尼ぞ無き
What is in fashion in Kyōto these days: willow-leaf-thin eyebrows (ryūtai), various hairstyles, wigs (ese-kazura), shioyuki (an unknown style), courtesans from Ōmi, young women dressed as men (onna-kanza). Even nuns are not unarmed with naginata.

— Ryōjin Hishō, 369

In Japan, cross-dressing is common in entertainment. Based on the names of Shinsarugakuki, Hirokazu Tsuji speculates that men dressed as women in Sarugaku. In the 13th century, yūjos and kugutsumes also began to dress as men, and the shirabyōshis and sex workers gradually merged to become the entertainers of the late Middle Ages.

Large numbers of contemporary people dress up in women's clothing at some Japanese festivals in many parts of Japan, including Ose Matsuri (大瀬まつり) of Ose Shrine and Otaue Matsuri (御田植祭) of Isasumi Shrine. Cross-dressing used to be a common occurrence at Yasaka Shrine festivals, such as the Gion Matsuri.

A festival called Ofudamaki (お札撒き), in which men dressed as women scatter talismans, is held at a Yasaka Shrine in Totsuka Ward, Yokohama City, Kanagawa Prefecture. At a rite called Ikazuchi no Daihannya (雷の大般若) at Shinzōin Temple (in Edogawa Ward, Tōkyō), men dressed as women parade through the town carrying a chest containing the Large Prajñāpāramitā Sūtras. At the Ōmiyuki Matsuri (大御幸祭) held at Sengen Shrine in Yamanashi Prefecture, men dressed as women carry a mikoshi and stomp on the embankment. Junko Mitsuhashi argues that the existence of such festivals can be explained through Sōsei Genri.

== See also ==
- Michael Banner
- Christianity and transgender people
- Homosexuality and religion
- Timeline of LGBTQ Jewish history
- Timeline of LGBTQ Mormon history

== Sources ==
- Conner, Randy P.; Sparks, David Hatfield; Sparks, Mariya (1998). Cassell's Encyclopedia of Queer Myth, Symbol and Spirit. UK: Cassell. ISBN 0-304-70423-7.
