= Ordination of LGBTQ clergy =

Ordination of LGBT clergy may refer to:

- Ordination of LGBT clergy in Judaism
- Ordination of LGBT Christian clergy
