= Miryam Kabakov =

American Jewish lesbian writer and organizer (born 1964)

Personal life
- Born: 1964 (age 61–62)
- Education: San Francisco State University; Wurzweiler School of Social Work

Religious life
- Religion: Judaism

Jewish leader
- Position: Executive Director
- Organisation: Eshel
- Began: 2012

Miryam Kabakov (born 1964) is an American Jewish social worker and community organizer. She is the Executive Director of Eshel, a national organization that supports and advocates for LGBTQ+ Orthodox Jews.

Among other positions, Kabakov has served as director of the Minneapolis Jewish Film Festival, as National Program Director of AVODAH: The Jewish Service Corps, and as a social worker at Footsteps. She also founded a support group for lesbian, bisexual and transgender Orthodox women in New York.

She was the editor of the 2010 anthology Keep Your Wives Away From Them: Orthodox Women, Unorthodox Desires, consisting of 14 essays by LGBTQ+ Orthodox women, which was named best anthology of 2011 by the Golden Crown Literary Society. She was inspired by the book Lesbian Nuns: Breaking Silence, which was edited by Rosemary Curb and Nancy Manahan and published by Naiad Press in 1985. She wondered why there wasn't a similar book for Orthodox women.

In 2019, she was one of the first grant recipients of the Jewish Women's Foundation of New York's The Collective project, which supports Jewish women social entrepreneurs.

== Personal life ==
Kabakov lives with her partner Mara Benjamin and two children in Northampton, Massachusetts. They previously lived in St. Paul, Minnesota. She identifies as "post-modern Orthodox" and attends a Conservative congregation.

== See also ==
- Eshel (organization)
- Homosexuality and Judaism § Orthodox Jewish views
