= Tadhg Cleary =

Openly gay Jewish rabbinical leader

Rabbi Tadhg Cleary

Personal life
- Born: May 6, 1993 (age 33) Dublin, Ireland
- Parent(s): Jon and Jennifer Cleary
- Education: Yeshivat Har Etzion, Yeshivat Chovevei Torah, Victoria University of Wellington
- Occupation: Jewish rabbi and spiritual leader

Religious life
- Religion: Judaism
- Denomination: Orthodox Judaism
- Profession: rabbi
- Yeshiva: Yeshivat Chovevei Torah
- Residence: Washington, D.C.
- Semikhah: Rabbi Avi Weiss

Tadhg Seamus Cleary (b. May 6, 1993) is a rabbi from New Zealand. He was ordained at Yeshivat Chovevei Torah (YCT) in June 2025 and is notable for being the first ever openly homosexual rabbi ordained by an American Orthodox institution.

== Early life ==
Cleary grew up in Wellington, New Zealand with his parents, Dr. Jon Cleary, an orthopedic surgeon, and Jennifer (née Sellen), a nurse. Cleary has a brother, Joshua, and a sister, Shoshana.

The Clearys had a loosely religiously affiliated home, sometimes attending a Progressive Jewish synagogue (akin to Reform Judaism in the United States). Cleary was first introduced to greater observance at age 12 as a result of an interaction with a religious mentor while studying for his bar mitzvah. Curiosity led him to investigate further, and he has considered himself Orthodox since 14. By then, Cleary was performing daily religious rituals and observing both Shabbat and kosher laws.

After attending Scots College in Strathmore Park, Wellington for high school, Cleary planned to spend a year learning abroad at Yeshivat Har Etzion in Alon Shvut, an Israeli settlement in the West Bank, but ended up remaining there for two additional years. Afterward, he returned to Wellington to earn a college degree. He studied law, educational psychology and philosophy (ethics) at Victoria University. Before he changed course to become a rabbi, his intention was to become a barrister, with an eye toward ending up in the judiciary in New Zealand.

While in high school, Cleary was a serious water sportsman, nationally placing in swimming. He was a champion in underwater hockey, and played water polo and field hockey as well. He benefited from excellent instruction in the school choir, which laid the foundation for later chazzanut abilities.

== Homosexuality ==
Cleary recognized his attraction to men before his bar mitzvah. Early on, he considered marrying a woman because of Orthodox rules against homosexual relationships, but he changed his mind in 2020. At the time, he was an advisor at his alma mater Har Etzion, and when he approached the administration to ask if he could come out to his students, they told him that if he did he would be asked to leave. He decided to remain at Har Etzion and in the closet.

Interested in having rabbinic guidance who would more compassionately embrace him, Cleary reached out to Rabbi Steven Greenberg, who in 1999 became the first Orthodox rabbi to come out as gay. Greenberg recommended that he attend YCT and spoke to the rabbinical director, Rabbi Dov Linzer, on his behalf. Cleary enrolled in 2022. Cleary informed YCT about the situation prior to enrolling, making his acceptance of their offer into their rabbinical program contingent on them permitting him to be openly gay, and they accepted. However, YCT did make it clear that he could not marry his homosexual partner while enrolled, and he agreed to these terms. Now that Cleary has matriculated, he has married his partner.

Until Cleary and the yeshiva were contacted by the Forward, neither had planned not to discuss his ordination publicly. In their view, this controversy is not pertinent to Cleary’s qualifications as a rabbi. In an interview, Linzer called Cleary “an enormous talmid chacham,” or Torah scholar, “who is God-fearing, scrupulous in his observance and happens to be gay.” Since news broke on this story, a number of Orthodox institutions have taken a stand on this significant move by YCT, both in favor of more inclusion as well as to demonstrate "concern for the implications this will have on the standards and definitions of Orthodox practice."

== Personal life ==
Cleary married on September 7, 2025 in Cortlandt Manor, New York in a religious ceremony that he designed to be "authentic and halachically effective." He lives with his husband in Washington, D.C.
