= Rachel Isaacs =

American rabbi

Rachel Isaacs was the first openly lesbian rabbi ordained by the Conservative movement's Jewish Theological Seminary ("JTS"), which occurred in May 2011.

== Biography ==
Isaacs earned her B.A. from Wellesley College in 2005, where she was the Hillel Co-president. She transferred to the Jewish Theological Seminary (JTS) from the Reform movement's Hebrew Union College-Jewish Institute of Religion in her third year of rabbinical school. Isaacs was mentored at JTS by Rabbi Carie Carter, who placed the tallit across Isaacs' shoulders at her ordination. Rabbi Carter was a closeted lesbian during her time at JTS, and wrote the originally-anonymous chapter "In Hiding" about lesbian Conservative rabbis in the 2001 book Lesbian Rabbis: The First Generation. Rabbi Carter is now openly lesbian, and works at Brooklyn's Park Slope Jewish Center, which Rachel Isaacs interned at.

In 2011 Isaacs became the first openly lesbian rabbi ordained by JTS, and later that year she became the first openly gay rabbi to join the Rabbinical Assembly.

In 2014, Isaacs was named one of "America's Most Inspiring Rabbis" by the Jewish Daily Forward. In 2016, she delivered the evening Hanukkah benediction at the White House.

She is now the rabbi of Congregation Beth Israel in Waterville, Maine, which is a Conservative synagogue, as well as the Dorothy "Bibby" Levine Alfond Assistant Professor of Jewish Studies at Colby College. She is also the director of the Center for Small Town Jewish Life, also at Colby.

== See also ==
- Timeline of women rabbis
