= Sandra Lawson =

American rabbi (born 1970)

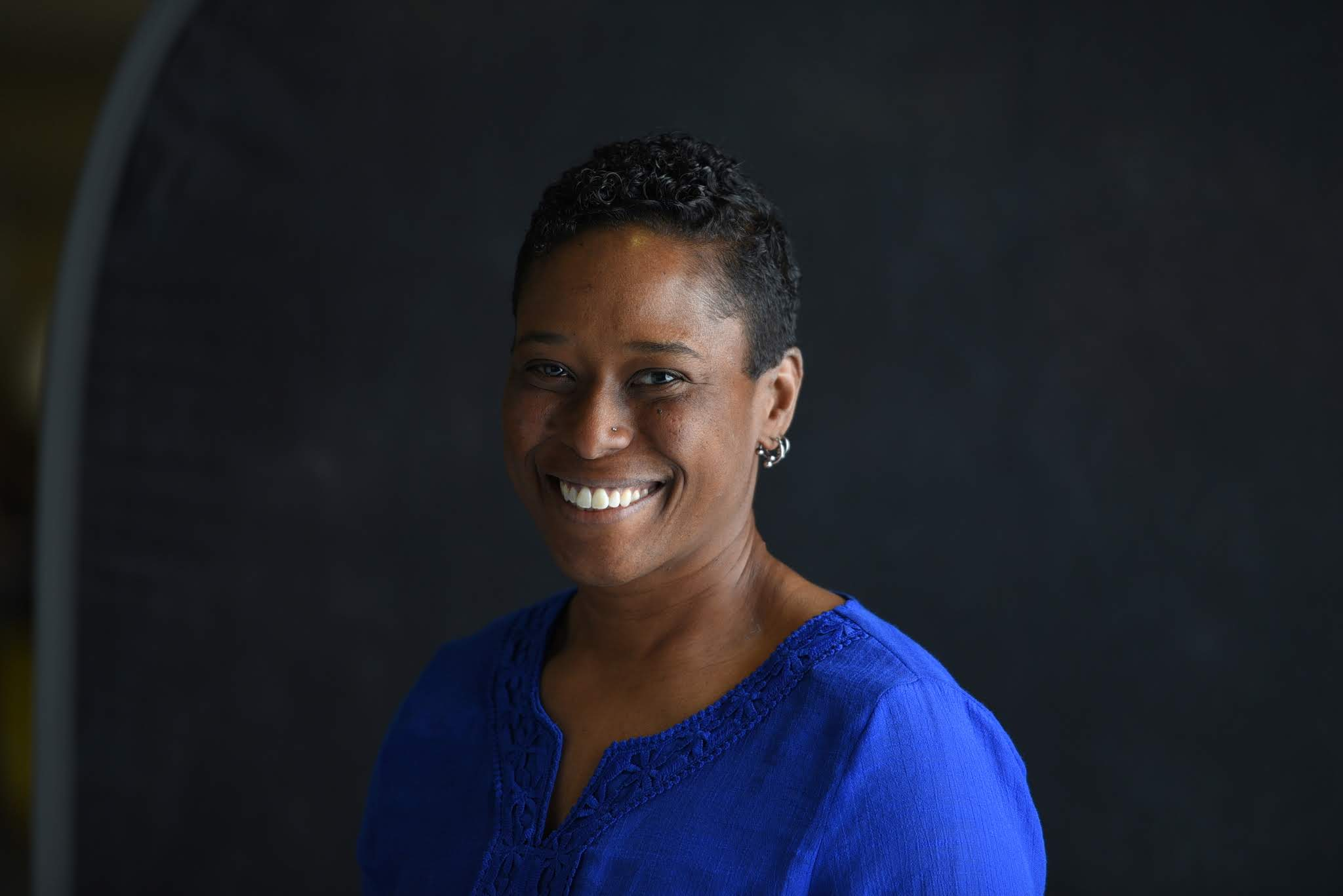
- Lawson in 2018
- Born: 1970 (age 55–56)
- Education: Saint Leo University, BA; Clark Atlanta University, MA; Reconstructionist Rabbinical College, (Semikhah)
- Occupation: Rabbi
- Website: rabbisandralawson.com

Sandra Lawson (born 1970) is an American rabbi and the first director of Racial Diversity, Equity and Inclusion at Reconstructing Judaism. She previously served as Associate Chaplain for Jewish Life at Elon University. Lawson became the first openly gay, female, and black rabbi in the world in 2018. She is a veteran, vegan, sociologist, personal trainer, food activist, weightlifter, author and musician.

== Biography ==
Lawson was born in St. Louis, Missouri, and grew up in a military, non-practicing Christian family. Lawson graduated magna cum laude from Saint Leo University in Florida with a degree in sociology. She also holds a master's degree in sociology from Clark Atlanta University in Georgia.

As a college student, Lawson came out as a lesbian and enlisted in the U.S. Army. In the army she served in military law enforcement, working on child abuse and domestic violence cases.

After graduating from college and leaving the military, she opened a personal training business. Through her client, the Reconstructionist Rabbi Joshua Lesser, she came to discover Judaism and fell in love with Lesser's synagogue, Congregation Beth Haverim. She ultimately converted to Judaism in 2004.

Lawson went on to serve as an investigative researcher for the Anti-Defamation League and later began rabbinical school at the Reconstructionist Rabbinical College. She chose this path after attending an LGBT memorial for Coretta Scott King where she represented the Jewish community. She was the first African-American, and the first openly gay African-American accepted into the Reconstructionist Rabbinical College, which occurred in 2011. She was ordained as a rabbi in 2018 and was hired by Elon University that year. She served as Associate Chaplain for Jewish Life at Elon until she began a new position as the first Director of Racial Diversity, Equity and Inclusion at Reconstructing Judaism in 2021.

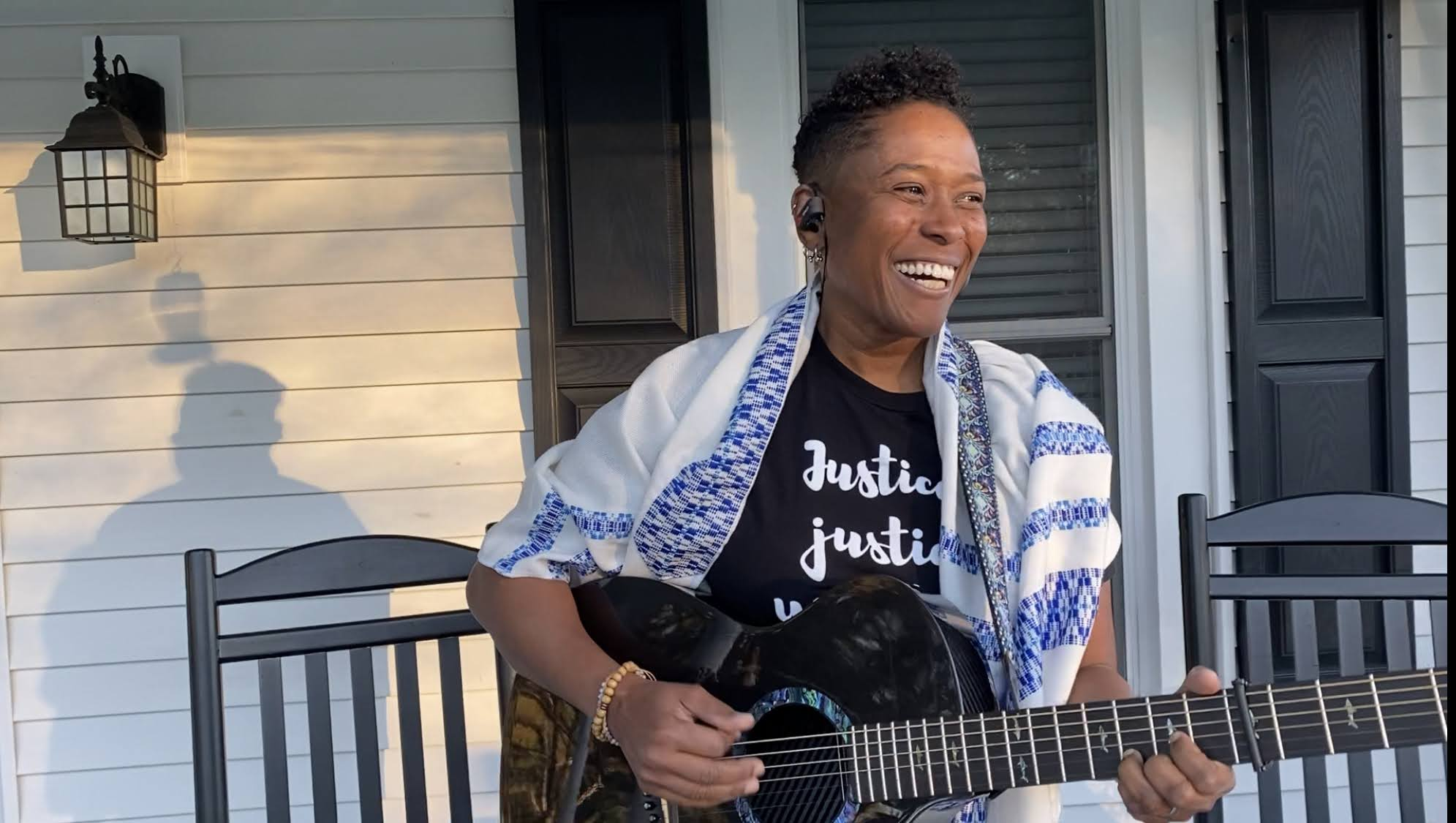
Lawson in 2020

Lawson has been noted for her efforts to teach Judaism in unique locations. As a rabbinical student, Lawson ran a Friday night service at Arnold's Way, a vegan cafe and health store near Philadelphia. She also has been noted for her efforts to teach by using social media and live video feeds. Lawson has been described as "Snapchat's Top Rabbi" and the Best TikTok Rabbi.

In 2019, the JTA included Lawson on their list of "The 50 Jews everyone should follow on Twitter" and in 2020, Lawson was named one of "The Forward 50 in 2020: The people we (mostly) needed in the year we (definitely) didn't". The Center for American Progress (CAP) named Lawson one of 22 Faith Leaders to watch in 2022.

Geoffrey Claussen describes Lawson as contributing to musar literature, citing her writing about curiosity.

Lawson has stated "I support the State of Israel, but I'm not invested in the political atmosphere of the State of Israel...I'm more concerned about the current struggles in our country. I don't even write about Israel." She has talked about receiving antisemitic harassment online from "people claiming to be pro-Palestinian". In 2020, she participated in a program hosted by the Hadassah Women's Zionist Organization of America titled "Zionist Women of Color", a panel of Jewish women of color discussing their challenges.
