= Juval Porat =

Jewish cantor and LGBT activist

Juval Porat (Hebrew: יובל פורת) is a Jewish cantor known for his work promoting LGBTQ inclusion within the Jewish community.

== Life ==
Born in Israel, Porat moved to Germany before moving back to Israel to study at school and yeshiva. He later moved back to Germany to study architecture at Aachen, and graduated in 2004. He also studied at the Jewish Institute of Cantorial Arts in Abraham Geiger College, a rabbinic seminary at the University of Potsdam. He was ordained as a cantor in Berlin in 2009, the first cantor ordained in Germany since the Holocaust.

Porat is a gay man. In 2021, he became the official cantor of the LGBTQ synagogue Beth Chayim Chadashim (BCC) in Los Angeles and now sings hymns at Temple Beth Sholom in Miami Beach, Florida.
