= Stacy Offner =

American rabbi

Stacy Offner is an openly lesbian American rabbi. She was the first openly lesbian rabbi hired by a mainstream Jewish congregation, and the first female rabbi in Minnesota. She also became the first rabbi elected chaplain of the Minnesota Senate, the first female vice president of the Union for Reform Judaism, and the first woman to serve on the [U.S.] national rabbinical pension board.

== Biography ==
She graduated magna cum laude from Kenyon College and earned an M.A. in Hebrew literature from Hebrew Union College in New York. She also has an honorary degree from Hebrew Union College, where she was ordained in 1984. That year she became the first female rabbi in Minnesota.

However, she was fired from her job as associate rabbi when she came out as a lesbian in 1987. She left with some of her congregants and in 1988 they founded Shir Tikvah Congregation, a Reform congregation in Minneapolis, where she was the first rabbi. Thus in 1988, she became the first openly lesbian rabbi hired by a mainstream Jewish congregation (Shir Tikvah).

Stacy Offner remained at Shir Tikvah until 2008 when she became the first female vice president of the Union for Reform Judaism, a position she held for two years. She later served as a rabbi at Adath Emanu-El in Mount Laurel, New Jersey. On July 11, 2012, she became the rabbi of Temple Beth Tikvah in Madison, Connecticut. She stepped down from this position in June 2021.

== Publications ==
Her writing has been featured in the journal of the Central Conference of American Rabbis (CCAR Journal).

== See also ==
- Timeline of women rabbis
