= Eshel (organization) =

Nonprofit organization for LGBTQ Jews

- Logo of Eshel
- Formation: 2010
- Legal status: 501(c)(3) organization
- Headquarters: New York, New York, United States
- Executive Director, Co-founder: Miryam Kabakov
- Founding Director: Rabbi Steve Greenberg
- Website: eshelonline.org

Eshel (Hebrew: אשל, Hebrew pronunciation: [ˈeʃel]) is a nonprofit organization in the United States and Canada that creates community and acceptance for LGBTQ Jews and their families in Orthodox Jewish communities. Eshel provides education and advocacy, a speaker's bureau, community gatherings, and a social network for individuals and institutions. It was founded in 2010 to provide hope and a future for LGBTQ+ Jews excluded from Orthodox and Torah observant communities.

== Organization ==
The Manhattan-based organization was founded in June 2010 when Nehirim, an organization serving LGBTQ+ Jews of all religious backgrounds, received funding to serve Orthodox LGBTQ+ Jews. This initiative grew into Eshel. Eshel is Hebrew for the biblical shrub with bright red flowers planted by Abraham to signal to parched travelers that a welcoming tent was nearby, often thought to be a tamarisk.

Miryam Kabakov is Eshel's executive director, and co-founded the organization with Steve Greenberg. Eshel operates with a modest staff, and the assistance of volunteer leaders and educators.

In June 2017, Eshel was selected by UpStart for its Jewish non-profit organization accelerator.

== Programmes ==
The organization partners with Orthodox synagogues and communities to educate and enable families, teachers, and leaders to welcome their LGBT family members and friends, with initiatives for parents, synagogues, and high schools. Eshel organizes educational weekend retreats which are distinctly observant of Shabbat and dietary laws.

=== Parents ===
Eshel supports Orthodox parents and families with LGBTQ+ children to provide social, religious, and medical resources. Many parents are concerned about their children's alienation from the Orthodox community after coming out. Eshel helps parents work with rabbis, teachers, summer camps, and neighbors to promote the love and acceptance of their children to keep families together and reduce suicide. Eshel held its first parents' retreat in 2013, and continues to hold a monthly call-in for parents along with an annual parents retreat.

=== Synagogues ===
Eshel launched its Welcoming Shuls Project (WSP) in 2015 to quietly identify and match welcoming Orthodox and traditional synagogues, rabbis, and communities with LGBTQ+ Jews wishing to participate in community synagogue life. It had identified more than 100 welcoming traditional and Orthodox synagogues by 2017, and helps guide transgender Orthodox Jews to synagogues that welcome them. Eshel convened Orthodox community members in Pico-Robertson to discuss the changing visibility of LGBTQ+ Orthodox Jews.

=== High schools ===
Eshel works with Orthodox Jewish high schools to reduce the expulsion and bullying of Orthodox LGBTQ+ students, and enable the students to remain engaged members of the school and Orthodox community. Eshel assists with one-on-one meetings and leads training sessions with educators. In 2016, Eshel intern and Shalhevet High School student Micha Thau created and launched the Pledge initiative at the Los Angeles Orthodox school. Eshel has subsequently worked with other religious high schools to protect their LGBT orthodox students from bullying and expulsion.

In 2017, Eshel signed on to the initiative Kavod Achshav ('Dignity Now'), and For the Sake of Dignity: A Campaign for Trans Youth, to urge Jewish organizations "to publicly support and protect transgender youth from harassment, bullying, discrimination, and violence."

=== Shabbatons ===
Eshel hosts an annual retreat for LGBTQ+ Jews at the Isabella Freedman Jewish Retreat Center that is confidential and Sabbath observant.

Eshel organizes periodic regional retreats. Eshel organized a Midwest retreat in August 2013 in Wisconsin and hosted a shabbaton at the Stanton Street Synagogue in June 2016.

== See also ==
- Homosexuality and Judaism § Orthodox Jewish views
- Jewish LGBT organizations
- Bat Kol
- JQYouth
- Keshet
- Trembling Before G-d
