= Siddur Sha'ar Zahav =

Siddur Sha'ar Zahav (Hebrew: סדור שער זהב) is the first complete Jewish prayer book that addresses the lives and needs of LGBT as well as straight Jews. It was created by Sha'ar Zahav, a progressive Reform synagogue in San Francisco, and was first published in 2009. The siddur includes liturgy specifically highlighting and celebrating queer Judaism and inclusivity of associated families. The siddur was highlighted in a Conservative responsum for providing non-gendered language options to refer to participants in synagogue services.
