= Pasadena Jewish Temple and Center =

Conservative organization in California, US

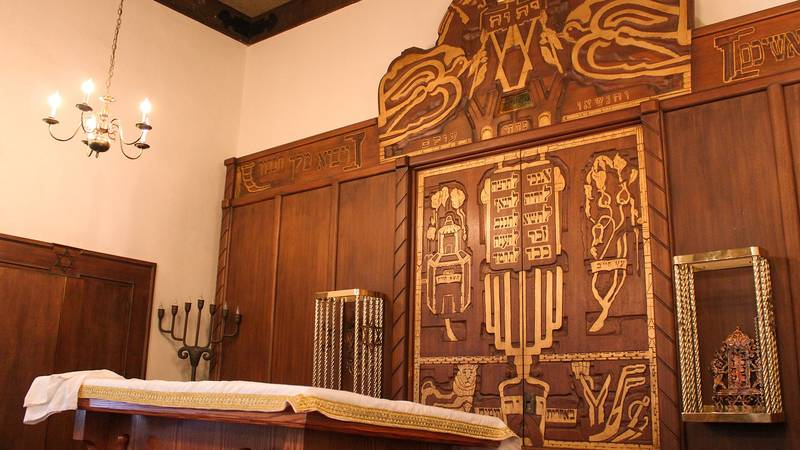

- Location in Los Angeles, California

Religion
- Affiliation: Conservative Judaism
- Ecclesiastical or organizational status: Synagogue
- Leadership: Cantor Ruth Berman Harris; Rabbi Gilbert Kollin (Emeritus)
- Status: Active

Location
- Location: 1434 N. Altadena Drive, Pasadena, California 91107
- Country: United States
- Interactive map of Pasadena Jewish Temple and Center
- Coordinates: 34°10′14″N 118°05′52″W

Architecture
- Type: Synagogue
- Style: Mission Revival
- Established: 1921 (as a congregation)
- Completed: 1945
- Destroyed: January 7, 2025 (Eaton Fire)

Website
- pjtc.net

The Pasadena Jewish Temple and Center (PJTC) is a Conservative Jewish congregation, synagogue and community center located in Pasadena, California, United States. Its buildings were destroyed in the January 2025 Eaton Fire, and it is the only Conservative Jewish synagogue in the western San Gabriel Valley.

== History ==
Pasadena's Jewish community has been present in the area since 1874, and attempts to organize it occurred in 1907 and in 1912. Temple B’nai Israel of Pasadena was incorporated in 1921. An initial home for the congregation was completed in 1923, "at the corner of Walnut and Hudson streets in downtown Pasadena". In the 1930s, Albert Einstein visited the community. In 1941, the congregation purchased the Mission Revival-style building on North Altadena Drive. The new building had "a wooden Torah ark carved by the Jewish artist Peter Krasnow".

In 1949 the congregation changed its name from Temple B’nai Israel to the Pasadena Jewish Community, and in 1956 to Pasadena Jewish Temple and Center. In the 1970s, the congregation hosted a concert by Van Halen and was home to the band's practices for a few years. These practices occurred in a larger sanctuary and social hall that was added to the synagogue in the late 1940s. Furthermore, it has evolved from being a religious center for the local Jewish community to a cultural and recreational center.

Since the 1990s, the role of the cantor also changed, focusing more on community building and an increase in female Torah readers. In 1997, PJTC merged with Shomrei Emunah of Sunland-Tunjunga. Since 2001, the synagogue has maintained good interfaith connections with Pasadena's Muslim community. In 2009, PJTC merged with Shaarei Torah of Arcadia. The following year, Joshua Levine-Grater was invited to Barack Obama's Hanukkah party to celebrate his social justice work. As of January 2025, the congregation has about 400 member families.

The synagogue is also welcoming towards LGBTQ+ members and became the first Conservative Jewish synagogue to hire a transgender rabbi in 2014 with the hiring of Becky Silverstein.

=== Role of women in the congregation ===
The role of women in the congregation has gradually increased over the years. Since 1952, women have had a greater presence in the organization's practices and governing bodies. Bnot Mitzvahs have had equal importance to Bar Mitzvahs since the 1980s. Additionally, more women have been Torah readers since Marcia Alper became the first to do so in 1987.

=== Eaton Fire ===
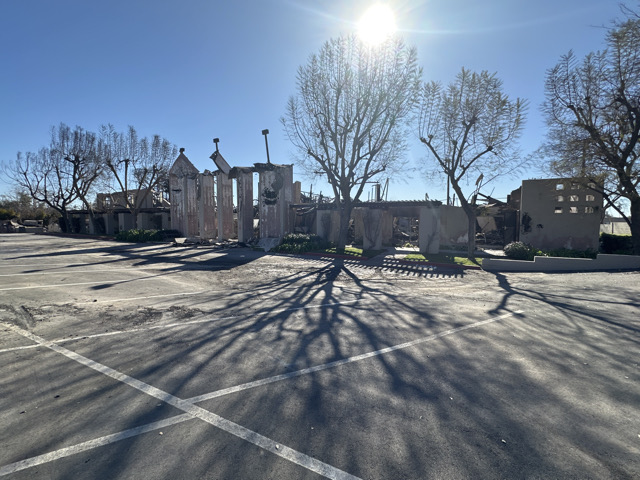
The building shortly after the Eaton Fire in 2025

The campus's three buildings were destroyed in the January 2025 Eaton Fire. All 13 Torah scrolls were removed from "the sanctuary, chapel, and classrooms" ahead of the fire and stored in a congregant's home. However, a mural was also revealed in the fires, although its purpose is not currently known.

== Affiliates ==
Until the Eaton Fire destroyed its campus, PJTC hosted on its campus several organizations including the United Synagogue Youth, the Weizmann Day School (between 1983 and 2020), and, since 2014, housed the B’nai Simcha Jewish Community Preschool. The Center has acted as an incubator for the development of Jewish leadership for the wider Pasadena Jewish community.
