= Reuben Zellman =

American rabbi and musician

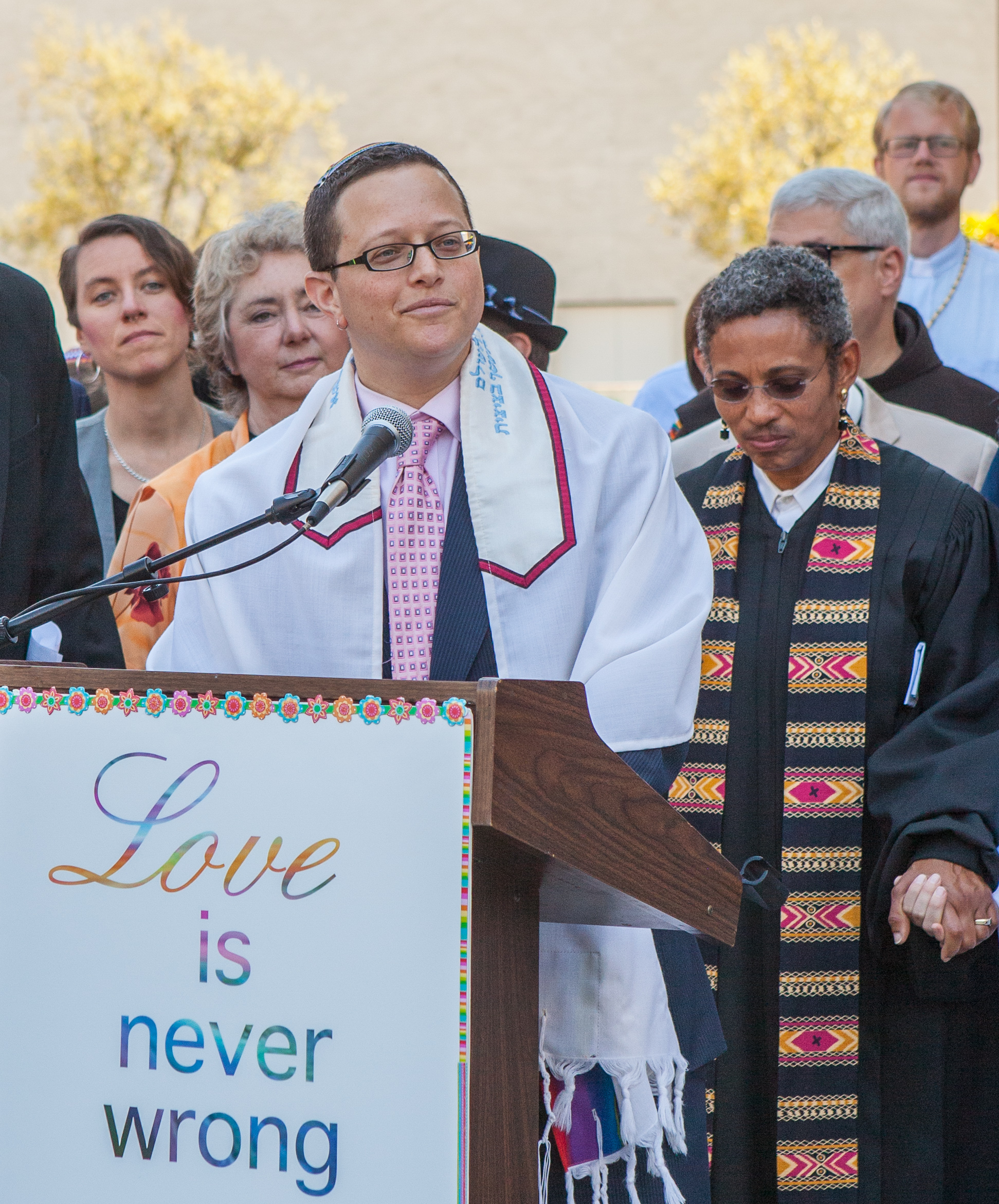
- Born: 1978 or 1979 (age 47–48)
- Education: University of California, Berkeley; Hebrew Union College-Jewish Institute of Religion; San Francisco State University
- Occupations: Rabbi; Musician
- Employer(s): San Francisco State University; San Francisco Community Music Center

Reuben Zellman is an American teacher, author, rabbi, and musician. He became the first openly transgender person accepted to the Reform Jewish seminary Hebrew Union College – Jewish Institute of Religion in 2003.

== Education ==
Zellman received his B.A. in Linguistics from the University of California, Berkeley. He received his master's degree in Hebrew literature from Hebrew Union College-Jewish Institute of Religion in Los Angeles. He was ordained as a rabbi by the seminary in 2010. He received a master's in choral conducting from San Francisco State University.

== Career ==
From 2010 to 2018, Zellman served as the assistant rabbi and music director at Congregation Beth El in Berkeley, California. He is a lecturer in the music department of San Francisco State University, where he directs the Treble Singers, formerly known as the Women's Chorus. Zellman also directs the New Voices Bay Area TIGQ Chorus, a chorus for transgender, intersex, and genderqueer singers, at the Community Music Center in San Francisco. He sings as a countertenor in the Choir of Men and Boys at Grace Cathedral, San Francisco. Zellman is on the staff of Congregation Sha’ar Zahav, an LGBTQ+ synagogue.

Zellman writes and teaches about transgender issues and Judaism. With Elliot Kukla, Joy Ladin, Max Strassfeld, and Jhos Singer, he founded TransTorah.org to help “people of all genders to fully access and transform Jewish tradition, and helps Jewish communities to be welcoming sanctuaries for people of all genders.”

He has been involved with transgender activism since 1999, the year he transitioned.

== Personal life ==
Zellman was born and raised in California, and has lived mostly in the San Francisco Bay Area since 1996. Zellman is intersex and identifies as neither male nor female. In 1999 he adopted he/his pronouns and a masculine gender expression, as he experienced harassment and felt it was "very dangerous" to have a non-binary presentation at that time.

== See also ==
- Elliot Kukla, first openly transgender person ordained by Reform Judaism (2006)
