= Elliot Kukla =

American rabbi

Elliot Kukla is the first openly transgender person to be ordained by the Reform Jewish seminary Hebrew Union College – Jewish Institute of Religion in Los Angeles. Kukla is the founder and co-director of the Collective Loss Adaptation Project (CLAP), which honors the disenfranchised and suffocated grief of disabled people. From 2008-2021, he was a rabbi at the Bay Area Jewish Healing Center. Prior to that role, he also served congregations in his hometown of Toronto, Ontario, Canada, as well as West Hollywood, California and Lubbock, Texas.

He came out as transgender six months before his ordination in 2006. Later, at the request of a friend who is also transgender, he wrote the first blessing sanctifying the sex-change process to be included in the 2007 edition of the Union for Reform Judaism's resource manual for gay, lesbian, bisexual and transgender inclusion called Kulanu.

Kukla's writing has been featured in Time Magazine, Teen Vogue, British Vogue, Them, The LA Times, Truth Out and The New York Times, and has been translated into Spanish, Korean, French, and Japanese. His first non-fiction book The Heart Lives By Breaking (Schocken, Fall 2027), and his first children's book The Lazy Day (Abrams, Spring 2027) are both forthcoming.

== See also ==
- Reuben Zellman
