= Steven Greenberg (rabbi) =

American rabbi (born 1956)

Rabbi Steven Greenberg
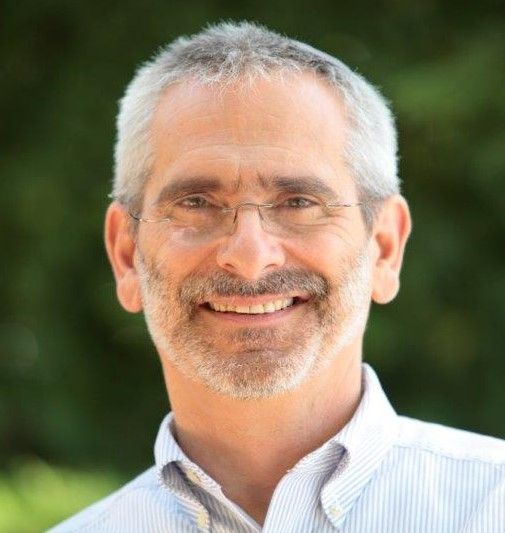
- Greenberg in 2013

Personal life
- Born: June 19, 1956 (age 70)
- Education: Yeshiva University (BA in philosophy)
- Occupation: Senior Teaching Fellow and Director of Diversity Project at CLAL – the National Jewish Center for Learning and Leadership, and author

Religious life
- Religion: Judaism

Jewish leader
- Position: Co-founder and director
- Organisation: Eshel
- Residence: Boston, Massachusetts
- Semikhah: Yeshiva University (RIETS)

Steven Greenberg (born June 19, 1956) is an American rabbi with a rabbinic ordination from the Orthodox rabbinical seminary of Yeshiva University (RIETS). He is described as the first openly gay Orthodox-ordained Jewish rabbi, since he publicly disclosed he is gay in an article in the Israeli newspaper Maariv in 1999 and participated in a 2001 documentary film about gay men and women raised in the Orthodox Jewish world.

Greenberg is a Senior Teaching Fellow and Director of Diversity Project at CLAL – the National Jewish Center for Learning and Leadership, and the author of the book Wrestling with God and Men: Homosexuality in the Jewish Tradition which received the Koret Jewish Book Award for Philosophy and Thought in 2005.

In 2011, Greenberg performed a same-sex commitment ceremony, but he believes that formal kiddushin for same-sex couples is against Jewish law.

He was listed number 44 on the 2012 The Daily Beast and Newsweek list of "America's Top 50 Rabbis for 2012".

== Life and career ==
=== Early life and education ===
Greenberg, the son of Conservative Jewish parents, was raised in Columbus, Ohio. When he was about 15, he began studying with a rabbi. He attended Yeshiva University in New York as an undergraduate and then as a rabbinical student. When he was 20, he went to study at Yeshivat Har Etzion, a hesder yeshiva in Alon Shvut in Gush Etzion near Jerusalem. He received his BA in philosophy from Yeshiva University, and his rabbinic ordination from the rabbinical seminary of Yeshiva University (RIETS) in 1983.

While at Yeshivat Har Etzion, he was attracted to a fellow student and concluded that he was bisexual. He went to consult with Rabbi Yosef Sholom Eliashiv, an eminent rabbi in Jerusalem, telling him: "Harav, I am attracted to both men and women. What shall I do?" And the rabbi replied according to Greenberg: "My dear one, my friend, then you have twice the power of love. Use it carefully." Greenberg remembers that he left with the trust that it would all work out. While the rabbi wasn't permitting him to have sex with men he was telling him that his desire was not ugly in and of itself.

Greenberg did not acknowledge he was gay until he was 28, and even afterwards continued to date women for another seven years. In 1993, he wrote the article "Gayness and God", admitting that he is gay, and published it under the pseudonym "Yaakov Levado" (meaning Jacob alone) in Tikkun magazine, but only came out six years later in an article titled "In the name of partnership" published in the Israeli daily newspaper Maariv on March 5, 1999.

=== Career ===
Early in his career, Greenberg held an Orthodox pulpit on Roosevelt Island in New York City. Since 1985, he has been a Senior Teaching Fellow and Director of the Diversity Project at CLAL – the National Jewish Center for Learning and Leadership, an interdenominational Jewish think tank, leadership training institute, and resource center. He is a co-founder and director of Eshel, a support, education and advocacy organization for orthodox LGBT Jews that saves lives and families. He is also on the faculty of the Shalom Hartman Institute of North America, a project of the Shalom Hartman Institute.

From 1996 to 1998 he spent two years as a Jerusalem Fellow with the Mandel Institute, studying educational policy issues and researching rabbinic attitudes toward homosexuality. Greenberg participated in the critically acclaimed 2001 documentary film Trembling Before G-d, featured at the Sundance Festival. The film about gay men and women raised in the orthodox Jewish world helped break the silence around homosexuality in religious Jewish circles.

On November 10, 2011, Greenberg officiated a civil marriage according to the laws of the District of Columbia in Washington, D.C. It was widely misreported Greenberg performed a religious ceremony; Greenberg has repeatedly agreed that same gender kiddushin (Jewish marriage) is incompatible with Jewish law.

=== 2011 same-sex commitment ceremony ===
Greenberg officiating at a civil marriage between two men in the United States, first reported by +972 Magazine on November 11, 2011, attracted controversy and was misunderstood and rejected by many within the Jewish community. Many were confused and thought that he had performed the rites of a Jewish wedding (kiddushin).

Greenberg described the wedding as a "same-sex commitment ceremony", commenting that "while it was a wedding according to the laws of the District of Columbia, it was not a kiddushin," adding "my position was and still is that kiddushin is not appropriate for same-sex couples." Two weeks later, he wrote in an article in the Jewish Week, "I did not conduct a 'gay wedding'. I officiated at a ceremony that celebrated the decision of two men to commit to each other in love and to do so in binding fashion before family and friends. Though it was a legal marriage according to the laws of the District of Columbia, as far as Orthodox Jewish law (halacha) is concerned, there was no kiddushin (Jewish wedding ceremony) performed."

On December 5, 2011, in response to the ceremony, more than 100 rabbis signed a statement calling gay marriage a "desecration of Torah values", saying: "We, as rabbis from a broad spectrum of the communities around the world, wish to correct the false impression that an Orthodox-approved same-gender wedding took place. By definition, a union that is not sanctioned by Torah law is not a wedding, and by definition a person who conducts such a ceremony is not an Orthodox rabbi."

=== Personal life ===
Greenberg currently lives in Boston with his family.

== Publications ==
Greenberg has been a frequent commentator for the media and has published several articles on Jewish law and church and state issues.

In a 2001 article "Between Intermarriage and Conversion: Finding a Middle Way" published in CLAL, Greenberg proposes using the rabbinic concept of ger toshav, (resident alien), to provide an accepted place for non-Jewish partners of intermarried couples, allowing them to experience "the joys of living in a Jewish home without insisting on conversion". As a marriage of a Jew and a ger toshav would not be legitimate under halachic law, Greenberg suggests using "cultural creativity" to find "new rituals that partake of Jewish resources and speak honestly about what is actually happening", the same as for gay couples, where in his opinion "kiddushin, the traditional ritual for the Jewish wedding, simply doesn't apply".

In 2004 Greenberg's book, Wrestling with God and Men: Homosexuality in the Jewish Tradition was published, meeting with critical acclaim. In particular it addressed permitted and forbidden sexual behaviour: "While the common understanding of the verse 'Thou shall not lie with a male as one lies with a woman' [Leviticus 18:22] has been taken to refer to both active and passive partners ... it would appear that the verse directly refers only to the active partner engulfing his penis in the body of another man. According to this analysis the verse prohibits one, and only one, sexual practice between men, namely, anal intercourse, and speaks specifically to the active partner. There is no mention of any other behavior that this verse would prohibit." In Greenberg's reading "the verse prohibits the kind of sex between men that is designed to effect the power and mastery of the penetrator. Sex for the conquest, for shoring up the ego, for selfaggrandizement, or worse, for the perverse pleasure of demeaning another man is prohibited," and he adds that reading Leviticus 18:22 "as a law against sexual domination and appropriation ... offers gay people a way to reconnect to God, Torah, and the Jewish people". Greenberg says that he interprets the passage in this way "because it offers me a way of coming back to Judaism. It's a radical reading, but if you believe that God hates what you are, why would you go to such a temple?"

In addition to it, Greenberg's interpretation of Leviticus 18:22, "the very verse that was for centuries read as requiring the ongoing demotion of women through the marking of intercourse as humiliation and thus femininity as degraded could be read as a full-fledged critique of the maledominated social hierarchy! The only way to redeem intercourse from its inevitable dominations is to press for gender equality on the deepest of emotional planes, to work formally toward ending the gender hierarchy, and to heal the ugly misogyny at its foundation".

Wrestling with God and Men received the 2005 Koret Jewish Book Award for Philosophy and Thought, considered one of the highest honors for authors writing prose on Jewish themes, and was a finalist for the 17th Annual Lambda Literary Awards.

== Reception ==
Some Orthodox Jews have criticized Rabbi Greenberg and questioned his Orthodox credentials. After Greenberg came out, Rabbi Moshe Tendler, Rosh Yeshiva at Yeshiva University stated: "Being an Orthodox Rabbi and actively gay is an oxymoron ... [It is] the exact same as if he said, 'I'm an Orthodox rabbi and I eat ham sandwiches on Yom Kippur'. In Tendler's opinion "it is very sad that an individual who attended our yeshiva sunk to the depths of what we consider a depraved society" and called Greenberg "a Reform rabbi".

Commenting on Greenberg's role in "Trembling before G-d", Rabbi Avi Shafran, a public relations professional for Agudath Israel of America who scolded the movie for not showing Orthodox Jews who have undergone conversion therapy to change their sexual inclinations, wrote: "Rabbi Steve Greenberg, billed as 'the first openly gay rabbi,' [a]ddressing the Torah's strong prohibition of male homosexual acts... suggests to the camera, without elaboration: 'There are other ways of reading the Torah.' What Rabbi Greenberg apparently believes is that elements of the Jewish religious tradition are negotiable, that the Torah, like a Hollywood script, can be sent back for a rewrite. That approach can be called many things, but 'Orthodox' is not among them."

In his review of Wrestling with God and Men for the Edah Journal, Rabbi Asher Lopatin affirmed Greenberg's "importance as a voice within the Orthodox community", and calls him "a brilliant, thoughtful and courageous rabbi" and his book "a brilliant work of creativity and research", he writes that "Wrestling with God and Man [sic], and Rabbi Greenberg's voice in this book fall outside the bounds of Orthodoxy" for three reasons: Because Greenberg "is not committing himself fully to Orthodoxy", because he "does not follow Orthodox methodology", and because he "is not sufficiently halakhically creative", not having "combined — in a novel way to be sure — [his] commitment to his homosexual identity and way of life with the binding nature of halakhah". At the same time, Lopatin is confident, that "Greenberg can write the Orthodox book that will show us that he is committed to staying the long and difficult course of persuasion that Orthodoxy demands".

== See also ==
- Judaism and homosexuality
