= Judaism and sexuality =

Jewish traditions across different eras and regions devote considerable attention to sexuality. Sexuality is the subject of many narratives and laws in the Tanakh (Hebrew Bible) and rabbinic literature.

In Judaism, sexuality is viewed as having both positive and negative potential, depending on the context in which it is expressed. Sexual activity has traditionally often been viewed as a grave sin if it is outside of the bounds of permissible behavior. On the other hand, many sources express a positive attitude towards sex between a married couple, also within same-sex marriages according to Reconstructionist, Humanistic, and Reform Judaism, and to a certain degree Conservative Judaism.

== Attitudes towards sexuality within marriage ==
=== Laws and Biblical sources ===
According to medieval Rabbinical enumerations of the 613 commandments, the commandment to procreate (Genesis 1:28) is the first mitzvah in the Torah. This commandment was understood by the rabbis to be only binding on men; women are exempt, though minority views imposed the obligation on both men and women. One of the common explanation for this was because childbirth puts them in physical danger, therefore they cannot be ordered to accomplish an act that put them at risk. According to many thinkers, the central nature of this mitzvah is due to the fact that God desires for the world to be populated.

There is another Torah commandment known as onah which obligates a man to provide pleasurable sexual intercourse to his wife on a regular basis (if she desires it), even if they have already had children, or are incapable of having children.

Deuteronomy 24:5 requires a man who has been married within the last year to "gladden" his wife at home, rather than joining the army to fight in a war which is ongoing. In later Jewish tradition, this is understood as a general requirement for every husband to stay at home with his wife for the first year of marriage, and for them to "rejoice" together.

Maimonides permits a married couple to engage in nearly any form of sexual activity:

A man's wife is permitted to him. Therefore, a man may do whatever he desires with his wife. He may engage in relations whenever he desires, kiss any organ he desires, engage in vaginal or other intercourse, or engage in physical intimacy without relations, provided he does not release seed in vain.

In many sources, it is recommended that husband and wife have sex on Shabbat. Often, this is said to be related to the obligation to delight in the Sabbath. There are also other reasons that contributed to this tradition, including saying that this is the only day of the week when Torah scholars have time, or that this is in order to imitate cosmic unions that happens on Friday night between God and the Shekihnah, as imagined by the Kabbalists.

Any emission of semen by a man makes him ritually impure, and if this occurs during sex with a woman, she too becomes ritually impure. However, there is no prohibition on becoming ritually impure, and no consequence to ritual impurity except the inability to visit the Temple in Jerusalem or touch certain sanctified objects. Since the Temple has been destroyed in the 1st c. CE, these are practically not a concern anymore.

=== Acceptance of the value of sex in a marriage ===
Some might say that in the Talmud and other classical rabbinic texts, "there is no revulsion from [lustful] pleasure nor recoil from romantic passion." Others might disagree and find there texts that do reject lust, for example. One passage suggests that sexual relations are one of three activities which are "a taste of the world to come", the other two being the Sabbath and the sun. Elsewhere, the Talmud criticizes one who sleeps in the same room as a husband and wife, preventing them from having sex that night. Another example of seemingly positive attitude to marital sexuality is Rabbi Meir's statement that the purpose of niddah laws is so that, upon the couple's resumption of sexual activity, "she should be as desirable to her husband as when she entered the marriage canopy."

In one story in the Talmud, while Rav was having sex with his wife, his student Rav Kahana hid underneath the bed. Rav scolded Kahana for this behavior, but Kahana countered that sex is part of the Torah, and therefore he must learn about it from his teacher.

While sexual lust is categorized as a form of "evil inclination" (yetzer hara), the rabbis recognized its necessity as a motivator of procreation, and thus described it as "very good" in one source.

Other talmudic texts show less enthusiasm regarding sexual activity. Thus, for example, some texts say that the above mentioned impurity created by ejaculation exists "in order that Torah scholars would not be with their wives like roosters" (B. Berakhot 22a): in other words, to reduce their sexual activity.

According to Iggeret HaKodesh ("The Holy Letter", a 12th-century work sometimes mistakenly attributed to Nahmanides), a man should arouse his wife during sex, and even that he should ensure that she achieves orgasm before he does. He also says: "But we who have the Torah and believe that God created all in His wisdom [do not believe God] created anything inherently ugly or unseemly. If we were to say that intercourse is repulsive, then we blaspheme God who made the genitals".

Some medieval rabbis even allowed forms of contraception (which otherwise might be forbidden) so that couples could engage in sex for pleasure.

=== Ascetic views ===
Despite the general acceptance of sexuality in marriage as described above, some sources advocate that especially pious people should minimize their engagement in sex.

According to rabbinic sources, Moses was physically separate from his wife Tzipporah while he fulfilled his role as prophet and leader of the Jewish people. This has been understood in various ways. According to one view, ritual purity is a precondition for prophecy, and Moses avoided sex to ensure he was ritually pure and able to receive prophecy at any moment. According to Maimonides, though, sexual pleasure is a distraction which is incompatible with the intellectual focus needed for high-level prophecy. No other prophet separated from his wife; only Moses had this high level of prophecy. This is not actually an ascetic view towards sexuality; rather it was a one-off exception.

Maimonides permits a married couple to engage in nearly any form of sexual activity, but praises one who limits sexual activity to the minimum necessary:

A man's wife is permitted to him. Therefore, a man may do whatever he desires with his wife... Nevertheless, it is pious conduct for a person not to act frivolously concerning such matters, and to sanctify himself at the time of relations, as explained in Hilchot Deot. He should not depart from the ordinary pattern of the world. For this act was [given to us] solely for the sake of procreation... Our Sages do not derive satisfaction from a person who engages in sexual relations excessively and frequents his wife like a rooster. This reflects a very blemished [character]; it is the way underdeveloped people conduct themselves. Instead, everyone who minimizes his sexual conduct is praiseworthy, provided he does not neglect his conjugal duties, without the consent of his wife.

Nahmanides went further, writing that "sexual relations are remote and disgusting according to the Torah, except for the perpetuation of the human species".

According to Raabad, there are four permitted "kavvanot" (intentions) for a man's sexual relations which receive Divine reward: for procreation, for welfare of the fetus, to fulfill a wife's desire, and that he relieves his lust through intercourse with his wife rather than in a forbidden manner. Yet the last one is a lesser reward, since the man should have had the strength to resist. If he does not show any strength, and has sex anytime he wants, this would not be rewarded. Although sex would not be rewarded by Heaven in this last case but it is not forbidden either.

== Forbidden sexual acts in Judaism ==
=== Isurei bi'ah ===
The term isurei bi'ah (Hebrew איסורי ביאה) refers to those one may not have intercourse with. The most serious of these form a subset known as arayot (Hebrew: עריות), based on the word erva ("nakedness") in Leviticus 18:6. Intercourse with arayot is one of the few acts in Judaism which one may not perform even to save one's life. The term erva is also used to describe parts of a woman considered to be immodest and sexually provocative, including hair, thighs, and singing voice.

Arayot include:

- Incestuous relations
- Male-male anal intercourse
- Bestiality
- Sex with a Jewish woman during her menstrual period (known as niddah)

Other isurei bi'ah include:

- Sexual intercourse between Jews and Gentiles
- Divorcees or female converts with Kohanim (priests)
- Mamzerim (offspring of adulterous unions) with regular Jews

When two people are forbidden from having sex together, the laws of negiah prohibit them from engaging in lesser sexual touch (including hugging and kissing), while the laws of yichud prohibit them from spending time together in private in a manner that would allow them to have sex undetected. These prohibitions do not apply in certain situations where sexual relationships are unlikely, for example among close family members.

=== Homosexuality ===
The traditional view is that the Torah forbids anal intercourse between two males (i.e. sodomy), and this is the view of Orthodox Judaism, based on Leviticus 18:22: "Thou shalt not lie with mankind, as with womankind; it is abomination." Rabbinic sources extend this prohibition to all other sexual acts between two men, which are prohibited similar to how they would be prohibited between an unmarried man and woman.

There is no explicit ban on female-female intercourse in the Hebrew Bible, but it is similarly condemned in later rabbinical halakhic texts.

Classical rabbinic sources also condemn marriage between two men, which they see as an activity performed by non-Jews which invited Divine punishment.

Some medieval Jewish authors wrote fiction and poetry which portrayed homosexual love positively, though often these seem to be adaptations of a style found in contemporary Arabic poetry, unlikely to be based on real-life love affairs. These narratives are not intended as literal accounts, instead conveying a more symbolic message.

In Liberal Judaism (United Kingdom), homosexual relationships are considered acceptable, and weddings are conducted for same-sex couples. This is also true for several other liberal Jewish denominations.

=== Extramarital sex ===
Extramarital sex is frowned upon by all Jewish groups, even though its legal meaning is not always obvious; according to some authorities, it falls under a biblical prohibition. Traditionally and according to Torah adultery is only defined by sex involving a married woman; a married man does not commit adultery if he has sex with an unmarried woman. Some contemporary thinkers conjecture that the written Torah never explicitly forbids sex outside the context of marriage, with the exception of adultery and incest, however, most authorities understand it to be explicit in Deuteronomy 23:18, "No Israelite woman shall be a prostitute". According to Exodus 22:15–16, the man who entices a single woman to have sex must offer to marry her afterwards or the equivalent in compensation, unless her father refuses to allow him. This law is only for virginal women, as their value in the marriage market, as it were, decreases. Therefore, the man must either offer to marry her or pay for her lesser value, as it were, in a marriage market that highly values virginity.

=== Masturbation ===
Despite not having been prohibited in the Torah in the form of an explicit commandment, the Halakha and the Oral Torah view male masturbation as a Halakhic prohibition and a great sin, deriving it as a biblical prohibition from Genesis 38:7. The attitude towards a male sperm is one of a potential future living human being, and thus, masturbation is referred to as morally, though not legally, similar to murder, in that the masturbator is exterminating his potential offspring. Kabbalistic literature declared the act of masturbation to be a major sin.

Female masturbation is less frowned upon, and indeed very rarely mentioned in any Jewish text.

In modern days, the Halakhic question on whether taking male semen for the purpose of medical examinations or insemination is a sin remains in dispute among Jewish legal authorities.

Many Ashkenazi authorities allowed for a married man to - under certain specific circumstances - ejaculate outside his wife's body as part of their sexual relations together, following a text by Moses Isserles in his comments on the Shulkhan Arukh.

=== Sexual fantasy ===
The halakhic literature discusses the prohibitions of hirhur (lit. thought) and histaklut (lit. gazing). Many of the practices of tzniut (modesty) serve to prevent these prohibitions from occurring.

=== Pornography ===
Pornography is not explicitly mentioned in any halakhic texts, but it is prohibited by many halakhic laws. The first of these laws are the laws of tzniut, or modesty. Acting in a pornographic film breaks the rules of modesty by exposing one's naked body. Additionally, those involved in the production of these films (even those who are not being filmed) are breaking the laws of tzniut by looking upon those in a sexually compromised position. The second set of halakhic laws prohibiting the production of pornography are those surrounding extramarital sex. Although extramarital relations were prevalent in the Torah, rabbis of the Talmudic period outlawed extramarital sex. Therefore, sexual intercourse between two unmarried porn actors would be prohibited by halakha. Finally, pornography is prohibited by halakhic laws surrounding masturbation, with which it over goes hand-in-hand. Not only is the viewing of pornographic content forbidden by these laws, but so is the production of pornographic content. The Kitzur Shulchan Arukh prohibits the spilling of seed, thus forbidding that a man engage in sexual intercourse without the intention to conceive. This not only prohibits men from creating pornographic content with a partner or partners, but also from creating solo content. Women, in slight contrast, have no such command to not spill seed, and thus the laws of masturbation do not prohibit them from creating pornographic content. Ultimately, however, people of all genders are prohibited from producing or consuming porn because of the laws of tzniut.

While pornography is specifically prohibited by halakhic texts, modern rabbinic responsum have mixed opinions on the subject. For example, it has been argued by some Orthodox rabbis that consuming pornography is the equivalent of having extramarital relations. Contrastingly, some Reform rabbis suggest that the consumption of erotic material could benefit marital relations. Contemporary rabbis within and between the denominations of Judaism have not come to a consensus as to whether or not pornography is acceptable in the modern age.

== Sexual practices and culture ==
The Talmud says that a man cannot force his wife into having sex. The Talmud also claims that rebellious children will come from people who conceive a child in certain ways, including if a woman has sex out of fear of her husband, if either one is drunk, and if a woman is raped, along with other examples.

== See also ==
- Jewish views on marriage
- Polyamory (see the section "Polyamory and religion")
- Religion and sexuality
- Tzniut (Modesty)
- Sexual violence during the Holocaust
