= Jewish views on homosexuality =

LGBTQ people and Judaism
- The star of David on a rainbow flag

Halakhic texts relating to this article
- Torah: Leviticus 18:22, Leviticus 20:13
- Mishneh Torah: For men: Issurei Bi'ah 1:14, 21:18; For women: Issurei Bi'ah 21:8

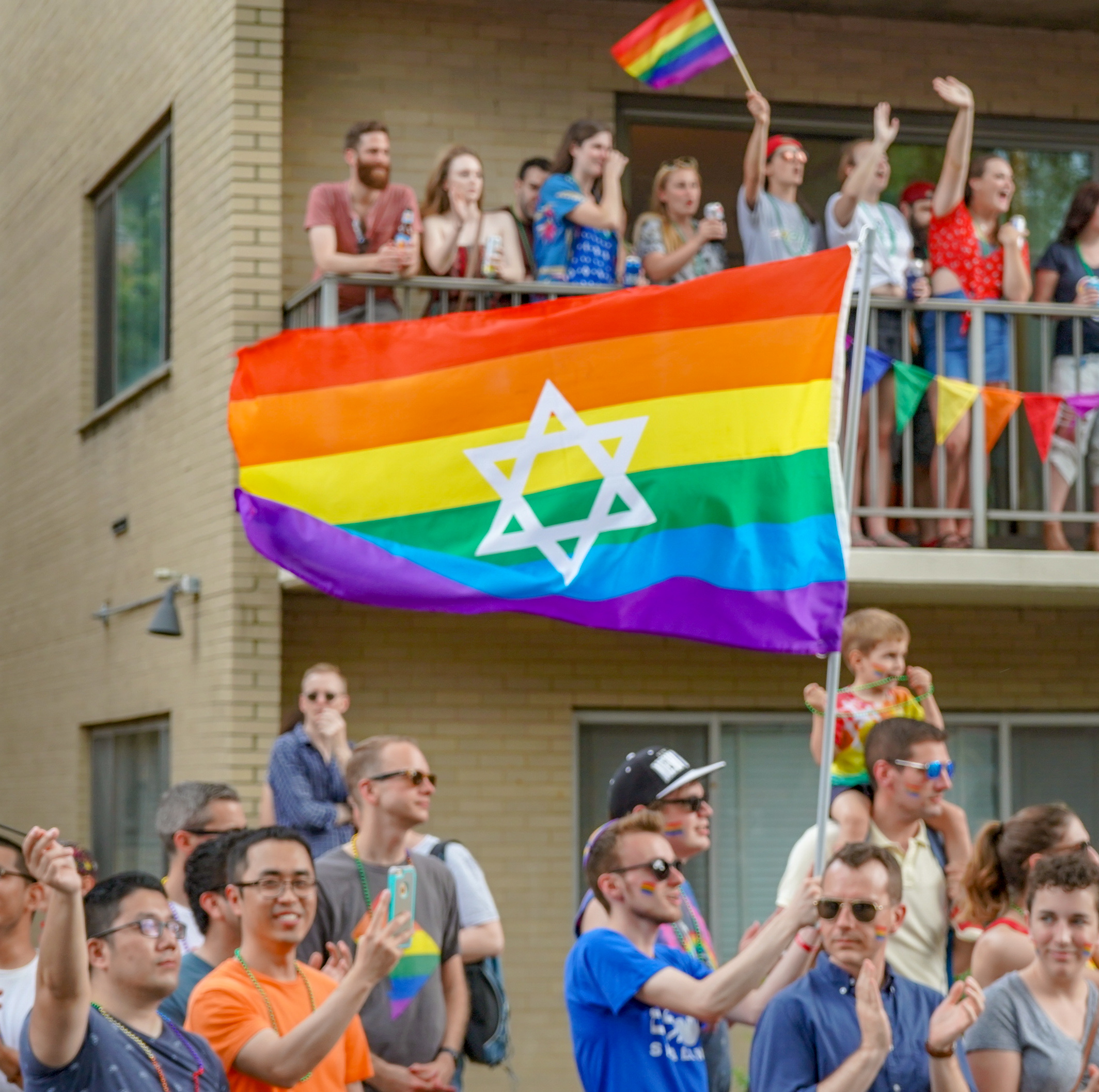
Jewish pride flag with the Star of David at a Pride parade

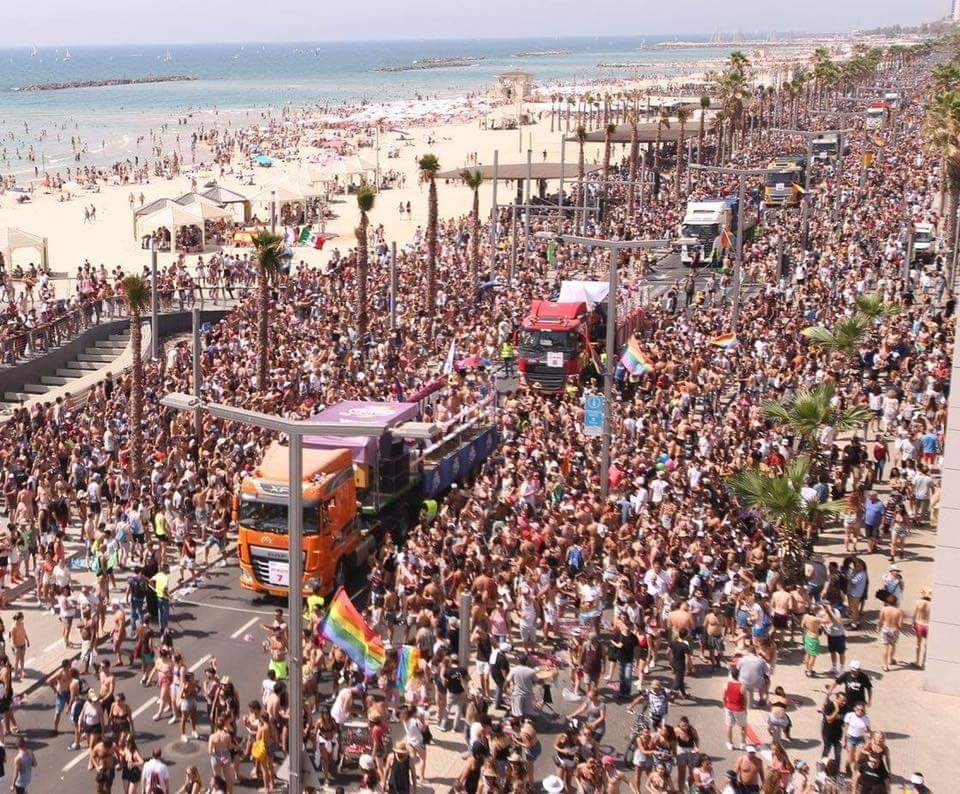
Tel Aviv Pride Parade 2018, the largest pride parade in Asia

The subject of homosexuality and Judaism dates back to the Torah. The book of Vayikra (Leviticus) is traditionally regarded as classifying sexual intercourse between males as a to'eivah (something abhorred or detested) that could be subject to capital punishment by the contemporary Sanhedrin under halakha (Jewish law).

The issue has been a subject of contention within modern Jewish denominations, and has led to debate and division. Traditionally, Judaism has seen homosexual male intercourse as contrary to Judaism, not homosexuality in-and-of-itself. This opinion is often still maintained by Orthodox Judaism.

Conservative Judaism's Committee on Jewish Law and Standards, which until December 2006 held the same position as Orthodoxy, has since issued multiple opinions under its philosophy of pluralism; one opinion continues to follow the Orthodox position while another opinion substantially liberalizes the view of homosexual sex and relationships (while continuing to regard certain sexual acts as prohibited).

Theologically liberal branches such as Reconstructionist, Humanistic, and Reform Judaism have all openly accepted homosexuality, homosexual intercourse, and same-sex marriage.

== Homosexuality in the Torah ==
The Book of Leviticus refers to male homosexual sexual practices twice (JPS translation):

.וְאֶת-זָכָר, לֹא תִשְׁכַּב מִשְׁכְּבֵי אִשָּׁה — תּוֹעֵבָה הִוא

Translation:

Thou shalt not lie with mankind, as with womankind; it is detestable.

.וְאִישׁ אֲשֶׁר יִשְׁכַּב אֶת-זָכָר מִשְׁכְּבֵי אִשָּׁה — תּוֹעֵבָה עָשׂוּ שְׁנֵיהֶם. מוֹת יוּמָתוּ; דְּמֵיהֶם בָּם

Translation:

And if a man lie with mankind, as with womankind, both of them have committed a detestable act: They shall surely be put to death; their blood shall be upon them.

Several commentators believe that the verses specifically condemn the practice of sodomy (i.e. anal intercourse between two males). Rabbinic thought supports this view, condemning homosexuality as an example of "unnatural intercourse" compared to the "natural intercourse" between non-related men and women. Intercourse in both scenarios only occurs if penetration exists.

Deuteronomy 23:17 tells followers: "None of the daughters of Israel shall be a kedeshah, nor shall any of the sons of Israel be a Kadesh." This has been interpreted as prohibiting the "sons of Israel" from serving as a homosexual temple prostitute in a pagan cult.

== Rabbinic Jewish application and interpretation of these verses ==
=== Penetrative male homosexual relations ===
The most severe prohibition regarding homosexual activity pertains specifically to penile - anal sexual intercourse between two males. This is the only homosexual act explicitly banned in the Torah - according to traditional rabbinic commentary, as well as the only homosexual act punishable by death, and the only one which renders the engagers divinely excommunicated (kareth). The act is regarded as a type of giluy arayot - the most strictly forbidden class of illicit sexual relations.

=== Prohibitions for homosocial interaction ===
==== Affectionate touch - negiah ====
The laws of negiah prohibit affectionate touch between an unmarried man and woman (except close relatives), because this touch is considered "approaching" a forbidden relationship. As gay male sex is included in the category of arayot along with other sexual prohibitions, the prohibition of negiah would seem to also apply between two gay men. Nevertheless, some sources raise the possibility that the law may be more lenient for two men than for a man and a woman. The consensus seems to be that touch between gay men which involves sexual desire is rabbinically forbidden, while touch which does not involve sexual desire (homoaffectivity) is permitted.

==== Seclusion - yichud ====
Another issue is the prohibition of yichud - seclusion of two (and in some cases, more) individuals in a place or setting in which uninterrupted sexual activity could occur. The Talmud records a debate over whether yichud applies to any two men. Maimonides, Tur, and Shulchan Aruch rule leniently that yichud of two men is permitted, because "Jews are not suspected of homosexual sex". Nevertheless, the Shulchan Aruch recommended to avoid such yichud, "in these generations where promiscuous people are common" (possibly a reference to the use of Köçek dancer-prostitutes in the Ottoman Empire at the time). However, this recommendation was not repeated by later authorities.

Based on the precedents that yichud can apply to two men in a circumstance where homosexual behavior is a concern, a modern halakhic authority rules that two men cannot be alone together if both of them are homosexual. Opinions also exist that the prohibition only applies to two men who are in a relationship with each other, or that there is no technical prohibition at all if they are confident they can avoid forbidden touch (but they should still avoid sharing a bedroom).

=== Applicability of Biblical death penalty ===
Like many similar commandments, the stated punishment for willful violation was the death penalty, though minors under 13 years of age were exempt from this, as from any other penalty. However, even in Biblical times, it was very difficult to get a conviction that would lead to this prescribed punishment. The Jewish Oral Law states that capital punishment would be applicable only if two men were caught in the act of anal sex, if there were two witnesses to the act, if the men involved were warned that they committed a capital offense, and the two men—or the willing party, in case of rape—subsequently acknowledged the warning but continued to engage in the prohibited act anyway. In fact, there is no account of capital punishment, in regards to this law, in Jewish history.

Rabbinic tradition understands the Torah's system of capital punishment to not be in effect for the past approximately 2,000 years, in the absence of a Sanhedrin and Temple. The relative absence of anti-homosexual prosecutions is also linked to the Jewish belief that homosexuality did not exist in the community.

Classical rabbinic Jewish sources do not specifically mention that homosexual attraction is inherently sinful. In fact, the mental and emotional feelings two men experience when they engage in intimate relations are not condemned. However, they are condemned if intercourse, commonly interpreted as penetrative sex, occurs. If the man caught does teshuva (repentance), i.e., he ceases his forbidden actions, regrets what he has done, apologizes to God, and makes a binding resolution never to repeat those actions, he is seen to be forgiven by God.

=== Lesbian sexual activity ===
Although lesbianism is not explicitly prohibited in the Hebrew Bible, sexual liaisons between women are forbidden by Orthodox rabbinical literature. The Talmud discusses tribadism (women rubbing genitals together, or nashim mesolelot) without explicitly prohibiting it; the main concern was whether or not this activity removed their status as a virgin, making them ineligible to marry a member of the priesthood. However, the Sifra condemned marriage between two women, considering it within the category of licentious foreign behavior which is forbidden to Jews. Following this lead, later halakhic codes prohibited tribadism on the same grounds. Maimonides recommended flagellation as a penalty for lesbian acts, rather than the death penalty. Lesbianism was considered a less serious offense than male homosexuality for a few reasons; most notably, lesbian sexual acts were not explicitly prohibited in the Torah and rabbinic scholars did not consider tribadism "true" intercourse. Since there is not necessarily penetration involved in lesbian sex, the sages did not believe that lesbianism impacted a woman's virginity or marriageability, and therefore lesbian activity was regarded as only a minor offense.

=== Same-sex marriage in Midrash ===
Sifra states: "'Like the deeds of the land of Egypt where you dwelt, you shall not do'—What would they do? A man would marry a man, a woman would marry a woman..."

Nonetheless, some contemporary scholars believe that same-sex marriage is theoretically permissible because kiddushin sanctifies the relationship between the spouses rather than the "sexual intimacies" they commit. The permissibility of same-sex marriage is also compared to the permissibility of marriage between a divorcee and a male descendant of a kohen (priest). The latter is accepted by adherents of Conservative Judaism because they believe the ethical components of Judaism, exemplified by justice and compassion, trump the legal components.

==== Reasons for the prohibition ====
Reasons suggested by the rabbis for the prohibition on gay male sex include the following:

- The rationale for abstaining homosexuality extends beyond not emulating the Canaanites
- It is considered a defiance of sexual anatomy, which is unlike God's intention of procreation and sexual activity
- The sexual arousal involved results in a vain emission of semen
- It may lead a man to abandon his family to pursue a homosexual relationship
- It is non-procreative
- It blurs the lines between masculinity and femininity

== Orthodox Jewish views ==
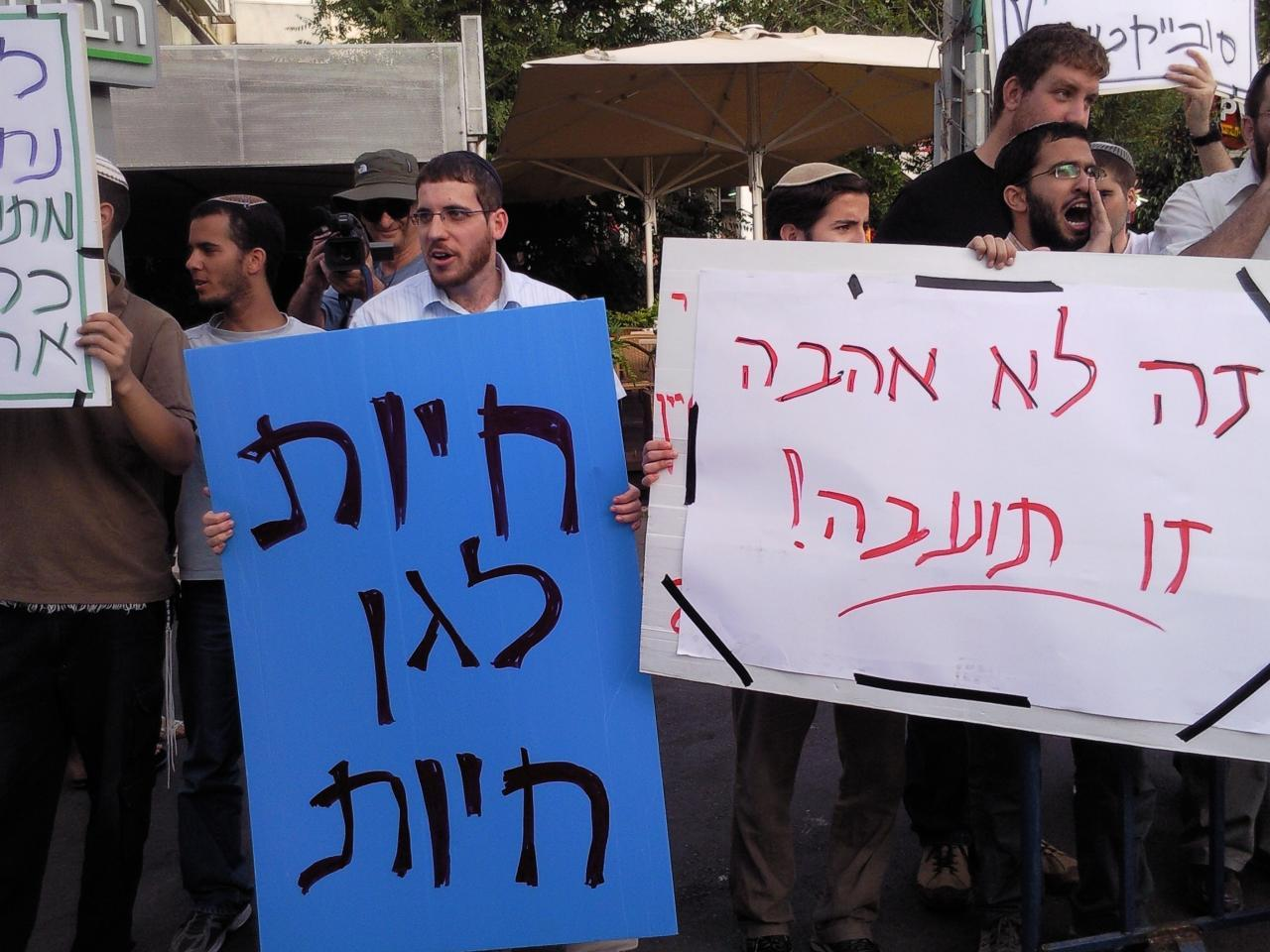
Orthodox Jewish protesters holding Anti-LGBT Protest signs during the Gay Pride parade in Haifa, Israel (2010)

While a variety of views regarding homosexuality exist within the Orthodox Jewish community, Orthodox Judaism generally prohibits homosexual conduct. While there is some disagreement about which male homosexual acts violate core prohibitions, the majority of Orthodox Judaism puts male–male anal sex in the category of yehareg ve'al ya'avor (lit. "die rather than transgress"). This is a small category of biblically-prohibited acts (Note: The three acts prohibited under yehareg ve'al ya'avor are forbidden relationships (e.g. homosexuality, incest, or adultery), murder, and idolatry.) which an Orthodox Jew is obligated to die rather than do. While almost any Jewish law may be broken to save a life under the principle of pikuach nefesh, the sages determined that Jews must observe these laws, even at the cost of their own lives. According to the Talmud, homosexual acts are not necessarily forbidden between non-Jews, though same-sex marriage is forbidden. There are numerous references in the Torah to non-Jews engaging in homosexuality, including the Egyptians and the Canaanites. Traditionally, Judaism only accepts heterosexual intercourse within marriage; some scholars have described adultery, celibacy, homosexuality, incest and bestiality as existing on a spectrum of wrongdoing.

In a speech given in 1986, the Lubavitcher Rebbe, Rabbi Menachem Mendel Schneerson, discussed "individuals who express an inclination towards a particular form of physical relationship in which the libidinal gratification is sought with members of one's own gender." He wrote that homosexuality should not be accepted as immutable, but rather treated medically.

In a 2008 open letter distributed to Orthodox community leaders, the Hod organization appealed to the Orthodox community to recognize them as part of the religious society. Up to 2013, 163 Orthodox rabbis from Israel and abroad signed this statement, including Yuval Cherlow, Binyamin Lau, Haim Navon, Daniel Sperber, Eliezer Melamed, Shai Piron, and Yehuda Gilad. In 2010, TorahWeb.org published a brief position statement entitled "Torah View on Homosexuality", co-authored by Ravs Hershel Schachter, Mordechai Willig, Michael Rosensweig, and Mayer Twersky, which reaffirmed their view of homosexuality as an abomination.

On July 22, 2010, a "Statement of Principles on the Place of Jews with a Homosexual Orientation in Our Community" was released. It was written primarily by Nathaniel Helfgot, Aryeh Klapper, and Yitzchak Blau. Signatories include more than a hundred rabbis and laypeople. This statement again reaffirms that homosexual activity is forbidden under halacha, but is sympathetic to "Jews with a homosexual orientation." It does not promote conversion therapy or opposite-sex marriage for gay Jews, urges communities not to ostracize gay Jews and their families, and in regard to gay marriage, states that "each synagogue together with its rabbi must establish its own standard with regard to membership for open violators of halakha."

An edict signed by dozens of Israeli Orthodox rabbis and published in 2016 by the Israeli Modern Orthodox rabbinic group Beit Hillel, a group which promotes inclusiveness in Orthodox Judaism, stated, in part, "According to the Torah and halacha, the [same-sex sexual] acts are forbidden, but not the proclivities, and therefore, people with same-sex tendencies, men and women, have no invalidation in halacha or tradition. They are obligated by the commandments of the Torah, they can fulfill a [ritual] obligation on behalf of the public, and carry out all of the community functions just like any member." It also stated, in part, "Just as it [is] inconceivable to mock someone for being physically, behaviorally, or mentally different, so too those with same-sex tendencies should not be mocked. On the contrary, those around them—family and community—should show special feeling for them, and apply to them the Torah commandment of 'Love thy neighbor as thyself' and to be diligent in avoiding the prohibition of insulting another."

Rabbi Dr. Immanuel Jakobovits describes the traditional opinion on homosexuality as follows: "Jewish law [...] rejects the view that homosexuality is to be regarded merely as a disease or as morally neutral... Jewish law holds that no hedonistic ethic, even if called "love", can justify the morality of homosexuality any more than it can legitimize adultery or incest, however genuinely such acts may be performed out of love and by mutual consent." Rabbi Norman Lamm argued that some (although not all) homosexuals should be viewed as diseased and in need of compassion and treatment, rather than willful rebels who should be ostracized. He distinguishes between six varieties of homosexuals, including "genuine homosexuals" who have "strong preferential erotic feelings for members of the same sex", "transitory" and "situational" homosexuals who would prefer heterosexual intercourse but are denied it or seek gain in homosexuality, and heterosexuals who are merely curious.

In January 2026, dozens of Orthodox rabbis issued a ban on gay conversion therapy, calling it harmful, ineffective, and based on the false premise that same-sex attraction is a psychological disorder.

=== Prominent Gay Orthodox Jews ===
American Orthodox rabbi Steven Greenberg came out as gay in 1999 to a significant response from rabbis of all denominations. Rabbi Moshe Tendler, a leading rabbi at Yeshiva University, stated, "It is very sad that an individual who attended our yeshiva sunk to the depths of what we consider a depraved society." As Greenberg has a rabbinic ordination from the Orthodox rabbinical seminary of Yeshiva University (RIETS), he is often described as the first openly gay Orthodox Jewish rabbi. Greenberg faced backlash in 2011 for officiating a same-sex wedding. The civil ceremony was not a kiddushin, which is not permitted for same-sex couples, and therefore not recognized under Jewish law. In response, a group of Orthodox Rabbis issued an open letter denouncing the ceremony and Greenberg's ordination. Greenberg's ordination remains valid.

Orthodox Israeli rabbi Ron Yosef became in 2009 the first Israeli Orthodox Rabbi to come out, by appearing in Uvda ("Fact"), Israel's leading investigative television program, in an episode regarding conversion therapies in Israel. Yosef remains in his position as a pulpit Rabbi. Yosef testified that his Yemenite congregation did not accept him being a homosexual very easily and it took them a while to accept it. Yosef received death threats in the year leading up to the 2009 Tel Aviv gay centre shooting. In 2013, he stated he was in a relationship with a man. Yosef has stated his approach to the issue of homosexuality in Judaism as follows: "It is clear to me that lying with another man is forbidden, and our starting point is commitment to halacha and Torah. The goal is not to seek permission. But you need to give us a shoulder and support."

In 2019 Daniel Atwood became the first openly gay Orthodox person to be ordained as a rabbi; he was ordained by Rabbi Daniel Landes, in Jerusalem. In 2024, Rabbi Landes ordained Rafel Jonathan Polisuk, who became the first openly gay israeli to be ordained a Rabbi. In October 2023, The Forward reported about Shua Brick, "experts say that Brick is the first openly gay rabbi to serve on the clergy of an Orthodox synagogue in the U.S.", explaining that Brick "runs the youth program, leads Torah study for adults, and fills in when the senior rabbi is out of town" at Beth Jacob Congregation in Oakland, California, where he started coming out as gay to members of the congregation over a year prior to October 2023. He was ordained by Yeshiva University. Yeshivat Chovevei Torah ordained Tadhg Cleary in June 2025, making him the first openly gay rabbi ordained by an American Orthodox institution.

=== Ex-gay organizations ===
JONAH was a Jewish ex-gay organization that focused on "prevention, intervention, and healing of the underlying issues causing same-sex attractions". In 2012, four former clients of JONAH sued the organization for fraud, claiming that it sold them therapies that were ineffective and counterproductive. Soon after in that same year, the Rabbinical Council of America (RCA), a professional association of more than 1,000 Orthodox rabbis around the world, sent an open email to its members that it no longer supported conversion therapy generally, or JONAH specifically. In 2015, a New Jersey jury found JONAH guilty of consumer fraud for promising to be able to change its clients' sexual urges and determined its commercial practices to be unconscionable. As part of the sentence, JONAH was required to cease all operations, but continued to operate under the name JIFGA until 2019, when it was found in violation of the previous order and shut down permanently. This final ruling also barred the executives of JIFGA from serving on the board of any nonprofit organization in the future.

=== Other viewpoints ===
Jiří Mordechai Langer, who studied in the Hasidic community of Belz, arrived in Palestine in 1940. "His reconciliation of homosexuality and Judaism involved [...] a homosexual Jewish theology; [...] a sociology of Jewish homosexuality in Hasidism".

Haredi Rabbi Avigdor Miller defended the assassination of Harvey Milk, saying, "A decent gentile got up and shot him because of his spreading homosexuality".

The late UK Chief Rabbi Jonathan Sacks wrote the foreword to Rabbi Chaim Rapoport's book Judaism and Homosexuality: An Authentic Orthodox View. In the foreword, Rabbi Sacks has written: "Compassion, sympathy, empathy, understanding—these are essential elements of Judaism. They are what homosexual Jews who care about Judaism need from us today."

Modern Orthodox leader Rabbi Aharon Lichtenstein is reported to have said that the intensity of the Orthodox community's condemnation of homosexuality goes beyond what its status as a religious transgression warrants, and that he feels toward homosexual people "criticism, disapproval, but tempered with an element of sympathy". Rabbi Steven Greenberg, for example, argues that there are many sins considered to be abominations in the Torah, homosexual men are disproportionately censured. While some Modern Orthodox congregations may still invite a person up for an aliyah who is known not to keep kosher, the same is not always true of a man known to engage in same-sex sexual activity.

In both the United States and in Israel, several groups have sprung up in the last few years that seek to support those who identify as both Orthodox and homosexual; support Orthodox parents of LGBTQ children; and promote understanding of homosexuality within Orthodox communities and among Orthodox rabbis. These include an umbrella organization called Eshel, the Gay and Lesbian Yeshiva Day School Alumni Association, the women's group OrthoDykes, the youth group JQYouth, the American-Israeli group headquartered in Jerusalem Bat Kol and the Israeli group Hod ("Majesty"). In 2012, Hod held an advertising campaign against conversion therapies and for self-acceptance of the religious homosexual community in Israel. Online blogs and support groups have enabled many to find other Orthodox LGBTQ people with whom to share the conflict between Orthodox religious and social norms and LGBT self-identification.

Orthodox Rabbis Shmuley Boteach and Zev Farber have questioned the opposition of Orthodox groups to government recognition of same-sex civil marriages (or in Boteach's case, to state-sanctioned civil unions), arguing that although Judaism does not condone homosexuality, governments should not enforce any particular religion's view of marriage, and that conferring civil benefits to committed homosexual couples should be viewed as promoting family values.

In October 2010, Boteach wrote an op-ed column in The Wall Street Journal on homosexuality, arguing that he does not deny that there is a biblical prohibition on male same-sex relationships and a commandment for men and women to marry and have children. Still, he understands those in context. "There are 613 commandments in the Torah... So when Jewish gay couples tell me they have never been attracted to members of the opposite sex and are desperate alone, I tell them "You have 611 commandments left. That should keep you busy. Now, go create a kosher home [...] you are His beloved children." Five years later he wrote that he believed in the equality of all of God's children, and has seen too much homophobia in his life. He believes that the biggest threat to marriage does not come from gay marriage, but heterosexual divorce, which he says afflicts half of marriages. He opposes government involvement at all in recognizing marriage, but supports state-sanctioned "civil unions" for all. Open Orthodox Rabbi Shmuly Yanklowitz declared that the Jewish values of justice, equality, and dignity lead him to support the cause of gay rights and advocate for same-sex civil marriage.

In November 2016, dozens of LGBT activists protested in Jerusalem against comments reportedly made by the city's chief rabbi Rabbi Shlomo Amar, who reportedly told an Israeli newspaper that gay people were an "abomination", and homosexuality a "cult".

In 2017, the Senior Rabbi of the Spanish & Portuguese Sephardi Community Joseph Dweck gave a class describing "the entire revolution of feminism and even homosexuality in our society [...] is a fantastic development for humanity". These words were condemned by Rabbi Aaron Bassous as "false and misguided [...] corrupt from beginning to end". This affair caused Dweck to step down from the Sephardic Beth Din but not as a communal leader.

In 2019, Rabbi Daniel Landes wrote, "Leviticus 18:22 [...] has not been erased from the Torah. But that biblical commandment does not give us license to ignore or abuse the significant number of carefully observant Jews who are LGBTQ."

Film documentaries made about Orthodox homosexuals in recent years include Trembling Before G-d, Keep Not Silent, and Say Amen.

== Conservative Judaism ==
As a matter of both Jewish law and institutional policy, Conservative ("Masorti") Judaism has wrestled with homosexuality issues since the 1980s.

Conservative Jewish writer Hershel Matt initially argued that homosexuals may be excused because Judaism does recognise 'constraint' as a valid excuse to disobey the law. However, Matt later shifted to outright support for homosexuality, viewing it as part of the natural order. Conservative Rabbi Robert Kirshchner states that Jews have historically adapted their laws to new circumstances, indicating accommodation for homosexuality.

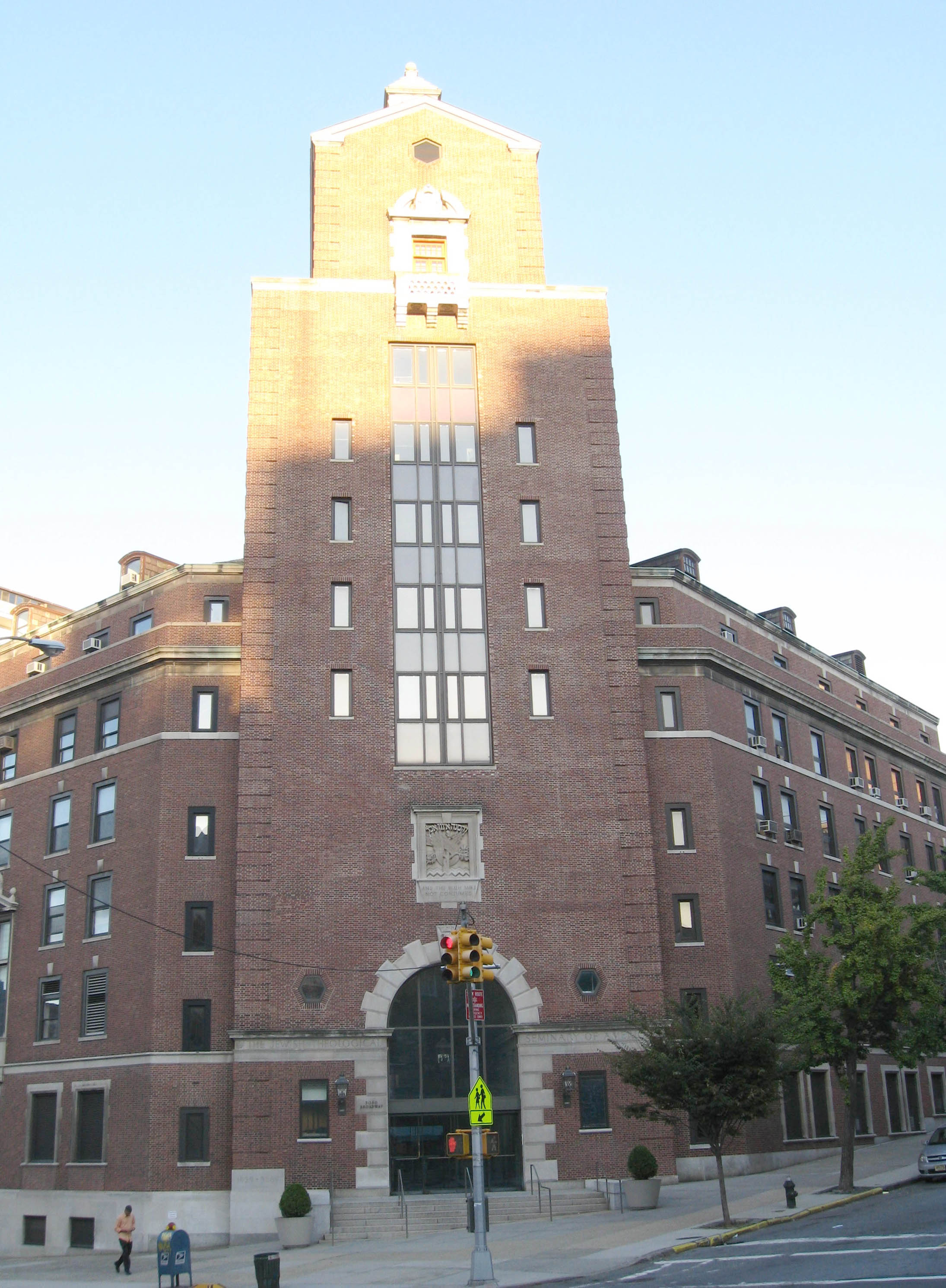
Jewish Theological Seminary of America, the main rabbinical seminary of Conservative Judaism

In Conservative Judaism, the Committee on Jewish Law and Standards (CJLS) of the Rabbinical Assembly makes the movement's decisions concerning Jewish law. In 1992, the CJLS action reaffirmed its traditional prohibition on homosexual conduct, blessing same-sex unions, and ordaining openly gay/lesbian/bisexual clergy. However, these prohibitions grew increasingly controversial within the Conservative movement.

In 2006, the CJLS shifted its position and paved the way for significant changes regarding the Conservative movement's policies toward homosexuality. On December 6, 2006, The CJLS adopted three distinct responsa reflecting very different approaches to the subject. One responsum substantially liberalized Conservative Judaism's approach including lifting most (but not all) classical prohibitions on homosexual conduct and permitted the blessing of homosexual unions and the ordination of openly gay/lesbian/bisexual clergy. Two others completely retained traditional prohibitions. Under the rules of the Conservative movement, the adoption of multiple opinions permits individual Conservative rabbis, congregations, and rabbinical schools to select which opinion to accept, and hence to choose individually whether to maintain a traditional prohibition on homosexual conduct or to permit openly gay/lesbian/bisexual unions and clergy.

The liberalizing responsum, adopted as a majority opinion by 13 of 25 votes, was authored by Rabbis Elliot N. Dorff, Daniel Nevins, and Avram Reisner. It lifted most restrictions on homosexual conduct and opened the way to the ordination of openly gay/lesbian/bisexual rabbis and cantors and acceptance of homosexual unions, but stopped short of religiously recognizing same-sex marriage. The responsum invoked the Talmudic principle of kavod habriyot, which the authors translated as "human dignity", as authority for this approach. The responsum maintained a prohibition on male–male anal sex, which it described as the sole Biblically prohibited homosexual act. This act remains a yehareg ve'al ya'avor ("die rather than transgress" offense) under the decision.

Two traditionalist responsa were adopted. A responsum by Rabbi Joel Roth, adopted as a majority opinion by 13 votes, reaffirmed a general complete prohibition on homosexual conduct. A second responsum by Rabbi Leonard Levy, adopted as a minority opinion by 6 votes, delineated ways in which to ensure that gays and lesbians would be accorded human dignity and a respected place in Conservative communities and institutions while maintaining the authority of the traditional prohibitions against same-sex sexual activity.

The Committee rejected the third paper by Gordon Tucker which would have lifted all restrictions on homosexual sexual practices.

The consequences of the decision have been mixed. On the one hand, four members of the Committee—Rabbis Joel Roth, Leonard Levy, Mayer Rabinowitz, and Joseph Prouser—resigned from the CJLS following adoption of the change. On the other hand, the Ziegler School of Rabbinic Studies of the American Jewish University in Los Angeles had previously stated that it will immediately begin admitting gay/lesbian/bisexual students as soon as the law committee passes a policy that sanctions such ordination. On March 26, 2007, the Jewish Theological Seminary of America in New York followed suit and began accepting openly gay/lesbian/bisexual candidates for admission for their Rabbinical program.

In June 2012, the American branch of Conservative Judaism formally approved same-sex marriage ceremonies in a 13–0 vote. In 2021, two Conservative Rabbis became the first known example of two Rabbis of the same sex marrying each other.

Although the American example was initially an outlier in the global Conservative movement, it is now the case that "all Masorti seminaries, except for the one in Argentina, now accept openly gay students". Since 2014 in the United Kingdom the Masorti movement offers a Shutafut ("partnership") ceremony to same-gender couples wishing to marry in a Conservative religious ceremony. The Shutafut contains many of the iconic elements of a traditional Jewish wedding service—the chupah, the seven blessings, the wine, the glass breaking, but without the symbolic act of acquisition in a traditional Jewish wedding.

In Israel, the head of the Masorti's Vaad Halakha (equivalent to the CJLS), Rabbi David Golinkin, wrote to the CJLS protesting its reconsideration of the traditional ban on homosexual conduct. Despite the contention within the Israeli movement however in the same year, Israel's Schechter Rabbinical Seminary sanctioned the training of openly gay Rabbis.

Hungary's Neolog movement—distinct from but seen as a fraternal counterpart and in some ways spiritual ancestor of the modern Masorti movement—has been more divided. Although not embracing and providing for same-gender marriage or full inclusion in Jewish life, Mazsihisz, the main representative umbrella body for Neolog Judaism, has affirmed its opposition to exclusion by homophobia and in 2013 dismissed the director of its youth movement for making comments about excluding gay people from all religious life for their sexual orientation. In 2021 the President of Mazsihisz was made to apologise for signing a Joint Declaration of the Churches on the Holiness of Marriage that held "the sanctification of the woman-man relationship by marriage is the foundation of human dignity". His critics included Mazsihisz's Chief Rabbi and earlier that same year the movement made a statement widely seen as condemning new Hungarian laws limiting the exposure of children to content referencing homosexuality.

Rabbi Bradley Artson, Dean of the Rabbinic School at American Jewish University, claims to have studied every reference he could find to homosexual activity mentioned in ancient Greek and Latin writers. Every citation he found described an encounter between males where one party, the master, physically abused another, the slave. Rabbi Artson could not find a single example where one partner was not subservient to the other. "Homosexual relationships today", Rabbi Artson says, "should not be compared to the ancient world. I know too many homosexual individuals, including close friends and relatives, who are committed to one another in loving long-term monogamous relationships. I know too many same-sex couples that are loving parents raising good descent [sic] ethical children. Who's to say their family relationships are less sanctified in the eyes of God than mine is with my wife and our children?"

== Reform Judaism ==
The Reform Judaism movement, the largest branch of Judaism in North America, has rejected the traditional view of Jewish Law on homosexuality and bisexuality. As such, they do not prohibit the ordination of openly gay, lesbian, and bisexual people as rabbis and cantors. They view Levitical laws as sometimes seen to be referring to prostitution, making it a stand against Jews adopting the idolatrous fertility cults and practices of the neighbouring Canaanite nations, rather than a blanket condemnation of same-sex intercourse, homosexuality, or bisexuality. Reform authorities consider that, in light of what is seen as current scientific evidence about the nature of homosexuality and bisexuality as inborn sexual orientations, a new interpretation of the law is required.

In 1972, Beth Chayim Chadashim, the world's first explicitly-gay-and-lesbian-centered synagogue recognized by the Reform Jewish community, was established in West Los Angeles, resulting in a slew of non-Orthodox congregations being established along similar lines. Beth Chayim Chadashim now focuses on the entire LGBT community, rather than just gays and lesbians.

In 1977, the Central Conference of American Rabbis (CCAR), which is the Union for Reform Judaism's principal body, adopted a resolution calling for legislation decriminalizing homosexual acts between consenting adults, and calling for an end to discrimination against gays and lesbians. The resolution called on Reform Jewish organizations to develop programs to implement this stand.

Reform rabbi Lionel Blue was the first British rabbi to publicly declare himself as gay, which he did in 1980.

In the late 1980s, the primary seminary of the Reform movement, Hebrew Union College-Jewish Institute of Religion, changed its admission requirements to allow openly gay and lesbian people to join the student body.

In 1990, the Union for Reform Judaism announced a national policy declaring lesbian and gay Jews to be full and equal members of the religious community. Also in 1990, the CCAR officially endorsed a report of their own Ad Hoc Committee on Homosexuality and the Rabbinate. This position paper urged that "all rabbis, regardless of sexual orientation, be accorded the opportunity to fulfill the sacred vocation that they have chosen". The committee endorsed the view that "all Jews are religiously equal, regardless of their sexual orientation".

In 1995, Reform Rabbi Margaret Wenig's essay "Truly Welcoming Lesbian and Gay Jews" was published in The Jewish Condition: Essays on Contemporary Judaism Honoring [Reform] Rabbi Alexander M. Schindler; it was the first published argument to the Jewish community on behalf of civil marriage for gay couples.

In 1996, the CCAR passed a resolution approving the same-sex civil marriage. However, this same resolution made a distinction between civil marriages and religious marriages; this resolution thus stated:

However we may understand homosexuality, whether as an illness, as a genetically based dysfunction or as a sexual preference and lifestyle—we cannot accommodate the relationship of two homosexuals as a "marriage" within the context of Judaism, for none of the elements of qiddushin (sanctification) normally associated with marriage can be invoked for this relationship.

The Central Conference of American Rabbis support the right of gay and lesbian couples to share fully and equally in the rights of civil marriage, and

That the CCAR oppose governmental efforts to ban gay and lesbian marriage.

That this is a matter of civil law, and is separate from the question of rabbinic officiation at such marriages.

In 1998, an ad hoc CCAR committee on Human Sexuality issued its majority report (11 to 1, 1 abstention) which stated that the holiness within a Jewish marriage "may be present in committed same-gender relationships between two Jews and that these relationships can serve as the foundation of stable Jewish families, thus adding strength to the Jewish community". The report called for the CCAR to support rabbis in officiating at same-sex marriages. Also in 1998, the Responsa Committee of the CCAR issued a lengthy teshuvah (rabbinical opinion) that offered detailed argumentation in support of both sides of the question whether a rabbi may officiate at a commitment ceremony for a same-sex couple.

In March 2000, the CCAR issued a new resolution stating that "We do hereby resolve that the relationship of a Jewish, same-gender couple is worthy of affirmation through appropriate Jewish ritual and further resolve, that we recognize the diversity of opinions within our ranks on this issue. We support the decision of those who choose to officiate at rituals of union for same-sex couples, and we support the decision of those who do not."

Also in 2000, Hebrew Union College-Jewish Institute of Religion established the Institute for Judaism, Sexual Orientation & Gender Identity to "educate HUC-JIR students on lesbian, gay, bisexual, and transgender issues to help them challenge and eliminate homophobia and heterosexism; and to learn tools to be able to transform the communities they encounter into ones that are inclusive and welcoming of LGBT Jews". It is the first and only institute of its kind in the Jewish world.

In 2003, the Union for Reform Judaism retroactively applied its pro-rights policy on gays and lesbians to the bisexual and transgender communities, issuing a resolution titled, "Support for the Inclusion and Acceptance of the Transgender and Bisexual Communities".

Also in 2003, Women of Reform Judaism issued a statement describing their support for human and civil rights and the struggles of the bisexual and transgender communities, and saying, "Women of Reform Judaism accordingly: Calls for civil rights protections from all forms of discrimination against bisexual and transgender individuals; Urges that such legislation allows transgender individuals to be seen under the law as the gender by which they identify; and Calls upon sisterhoods to hold informative programs about the transgender and bisexual communities."

In 2009, Siddur Sha'ar Zahav, a prayer book written to address the lives and needs of LGBTQ as well as heterosexual and cisgender Jews, was published.

In 2014, the CCAR joined a lawsuit challenging North Carolina's ban on same-sex marriage, which is America's first faith-based challenge to same-sex marriage bans.

In 2015, Rabbi Denise Eger became the first openly gay president of the CCAR.

Also in 2015, the High Holy Days Reform Jewish prayer book Mishkan HaNefesh was released; it is intended as a companion to Mishkan T'filah. Mishkan HaNefesh can be translated as "sanctuary of the soul". It replaces a line from the Reform movement's earlier prayerbook, "Gates of Repentance", that mentioned the joy of a bride and groom specifically, with the line "rejoicing with couples under the chuppah [wedding canopy]", and adds a third, non-gendered option to the way worshippers are called to the Torah, offering "mibeit", Hebrew for "from the house of", in addition to the traditional "son of" or "daughter of". The Mishkan HaNefesh includes several sets of translations for the traditional prayers. Psalm 23 includes the familiar "traditional" translation, an adaptation that is considered "gender-sensitive" but remains faithful to the traditional version, a feminist adaption from Phyllis Appell Bass, and the fourth was published in 1978 by a contemporary rabbi.

== Reconstructionist Judaism ==
The Reconstructionist movement sees homosexuality and bisexuality as normal expressions of sexuality and welcomes gays, bisexuals, and lesbians into Reconstructionist communities to participate fully in every aspect of community life. Since 1985, the Reconstructionist Rabbinical College has admitted openly gay, bisexual, and lesbian candidates to their rabbinical and cantorial programs. In 1993, a movement Commission issued: Homosexuality and Judaism: The Reconstructionist Position. The Reconstructionist Rabbinical Association (RRA) encourages its members to officiate at same-sex marriages/commitment ceremonies, though the RRA does not require its members to officiate at them. In 2007, the Reconstructionist Rabbinical Association elected as president Rabbi Toba Spitzer, the first openly LGBT person chosen to head a rabbinical association in the United States. In 2011 Sandra Lawson became the first openly homosexual African-American and first African-American admitted to the Reconstructionist Rabbinical College; she was ordained in June 2018, which made her the first openly homosexual, female, black rabbi in the world. In 2013, the Reconstructionist Rabbinical Association elected as president Rabbi Jason Klein, the first openly gay man chosen to head a national rabbinical association of one of the major Jewish denominations in the United States. Also in 2013, Rabbi Deborah Waxman was elected as the president of the Reconstructionist Rabbinical College. As the President, she is believed to be the first woman and first lesbian to lead a Jewish congregational union, and the first female rabbi and first lesbian to lead a Jewish seminary; the Reconstructionist Rabbinical College is both a congregational union and a seminary.

== Jewish Renewal ==
Jewish Renewal is a recent movement in Judaism which endeavors to reinvigorate modern Judaism with Kabbalistic, Hasidic, musical and meditative practices; it describes itself as "a worldwide, transdenominational movement grounded in Judaism's prophetic and mystical traditions". The Jewish Renewal movement ordains people of all sexual orientations as rabbis and cantors. In 2005, Eli Cohen became the first openly gay rabbi ordained by the Jewish Renewal Movement, followed by Chaya Gusfield and Rabbi Lori Klein in 2006, who became the two first openly lesbian rabbis ordained by the Jewish Renewal movement. In 2007, Jalda Rebling, born in Amsterdam and now living in Germany, became the first openly lesbian cantor ordained by the Jewish Renewal movement. In 2011, the bisexual rights activist Debra Kolodny was ordained as a rabbi by the Jewish Renewal movement and hired as the rabbi for congregation P'nai Or of Portland. The Statement of Principles of ALEPH: Alliance for Jewish Renewal (and OHALAH and the Rabbinic Pastors Association) states in part, "We welcome and recognize the sanctity of every individual regardless of sexual orientation or gender identity. We recognize respectful and mutual expressions of adult human sexuality as potentially sacred expressions of love, and therefore, we strive to welcome a variety of constellations of intimate relationships and family forms including gay, lesbian, and heterosexual relationships as well as people choosing to be single."

== Humanistic Judaism ==
Humanistic Judaism is a movement in Judaism that offers a non-theistic alternative in contemporary Jewish life. In 2004, the Society for Humanistic Judaism issued a resolution supporting "the legal recognition of marriage and divorce between adults of the same sex", and affirming "the value of marriage between any two committed adults with the sense of obligations, responsibilities, and consequences thereof". In 2010 they pledged to speak out against homophobic bullying. The Association of Humanistic Rabbis has also issued a pro-LGBT statement titled "In Support of Diverse Sexualities and Gender Identities". It was adopted in 2003 and issued in 2004.

== LGBT-affirmative activities ==
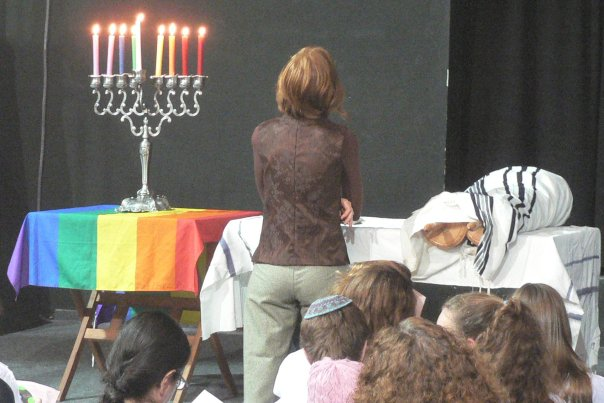
A halachic egalitarian Pride minyan in Tel Aviv on the second Shabbat of Hanukkah.

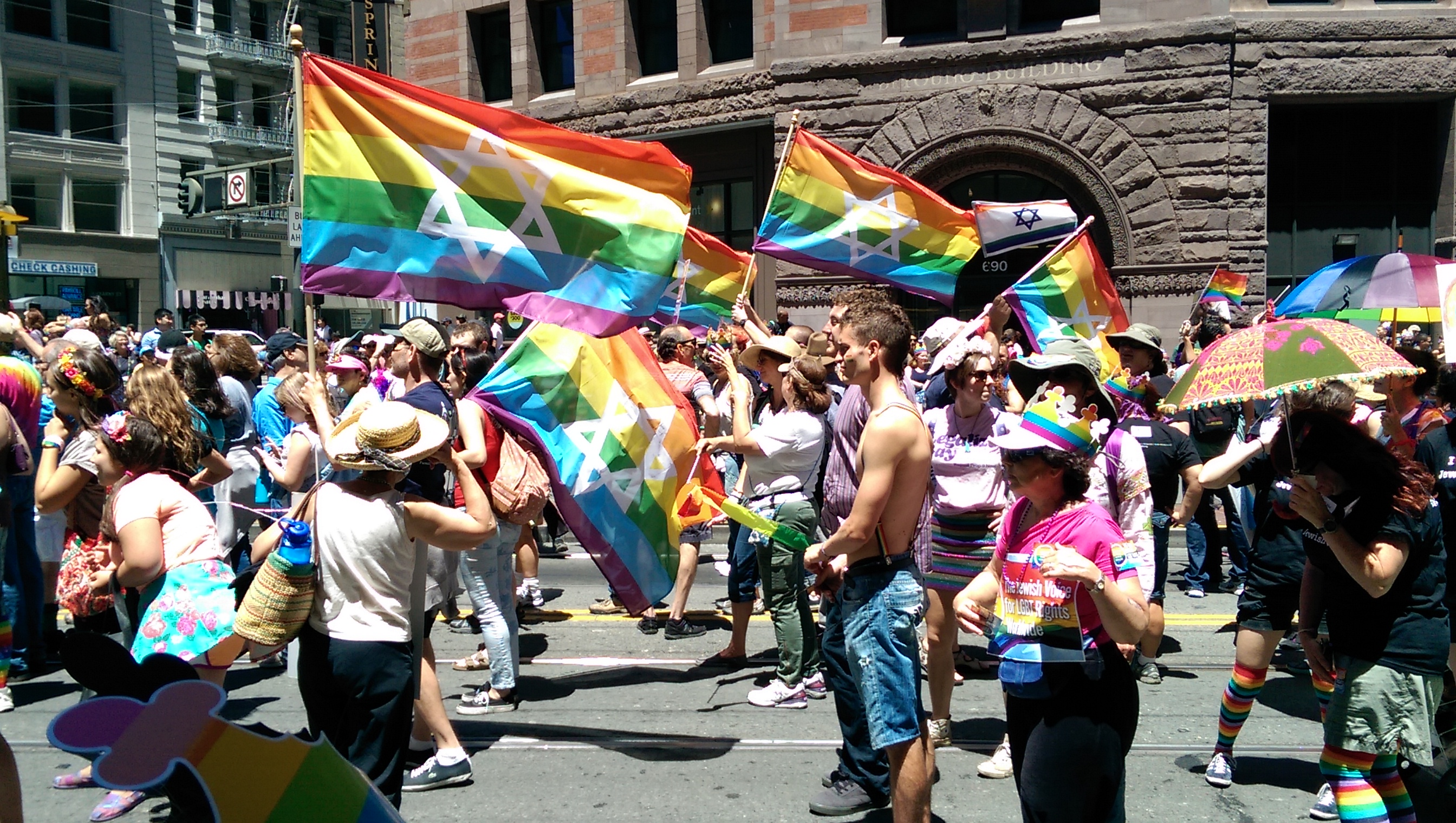
Marchers at San Francisco Pride 2014

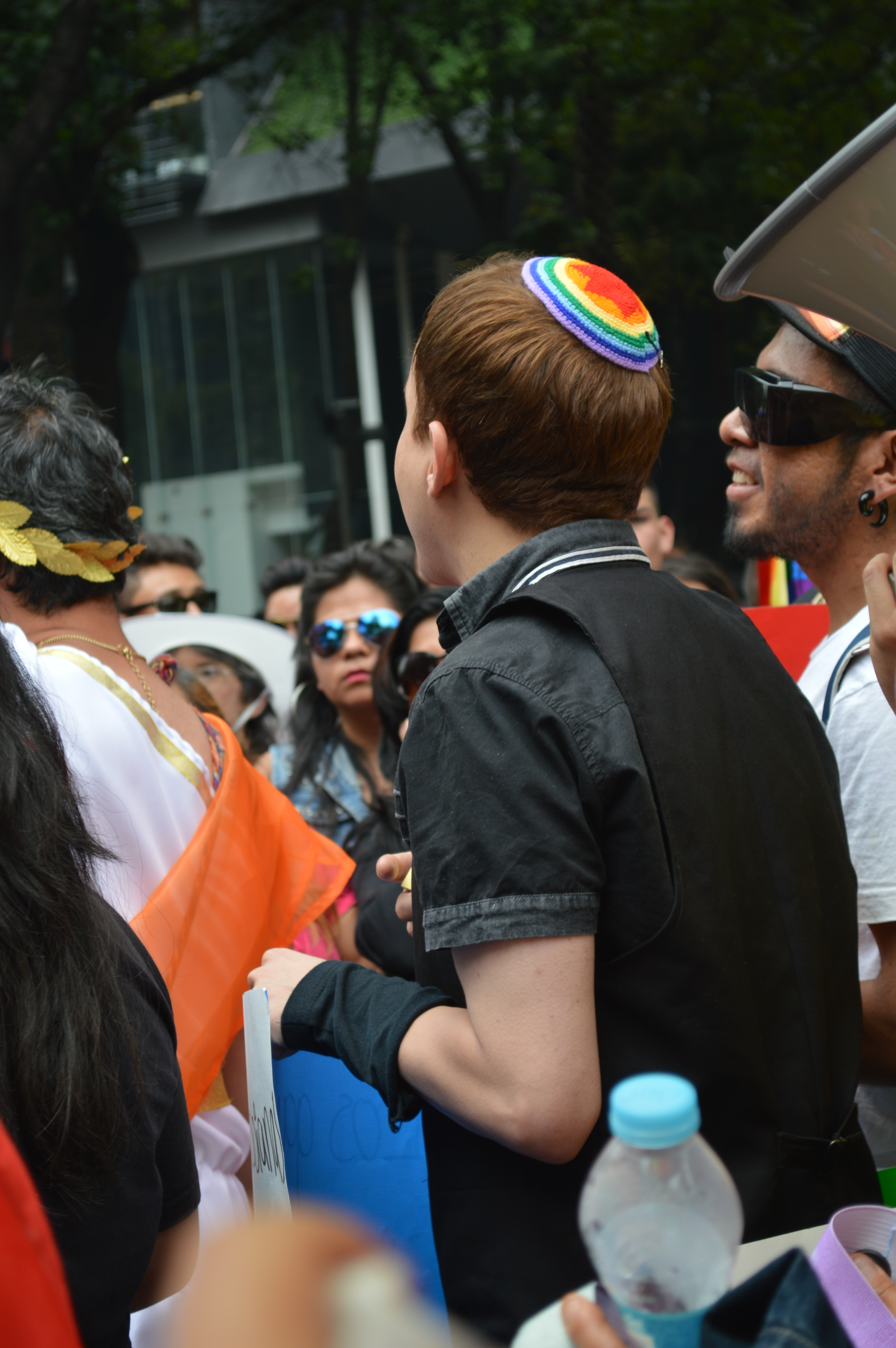
A Pride participant wears a rainbow kippah at the 2015 Marcha Gay of Mexico City

Jewish LGBT rights advocates and sympathetic clergy have created various institutions within Jewish life to accommodate gay, lesbian, bisexual, and transgender parishioners. Beth Chayim Chadashim, established in 1972 in West Los Angeles, was the world's first explicitly-gay-and-lesbian-centered synagogue recognized by the Reform Jewish community, resulting in a slew of non-Orthodox congregations being established along similar lines, including Congregation Beit Simchat Torah in New York City, Bet Mishpachah in Washington, D.C., and Congregation Or Chadash in Chicago. Beth Chayim Chadashim now focuses on the entire LGBT community, rather than just gays and lesbians.

LGBT-inclusive services and ceremonies specific to Jewish religious culture have also been created, ranging from LGBT-affirmative haggadot for Passover to a "Stonewall Shabbat Seder".

In October 2012 Rainbow Jews, an oral history project showcasing the lives of Jewish bisexual, lesbian, gay, and transgender people in the United Kingdom from the 1950s until the present, was launched. It is the United Kingdom's first archive of Jewish bisexual, lesbian, gay, and transgender history.

The ONE National Gay and Lesbian Archives has, among other things, the Twice Blessed Collection, circa 1966-2000; this collection "consists of materials documenting the Jewish lesbian, gay, bisexual, and transgender experience, circa 1966-2000, collected by the Jewish Gay, Lesbian, Bisexual, and Transgender Archives, founded and operated by Johnny Abush".

Recent research by the sociocultural psychologist, Chana Etengoff, has highlighted the therapeutic benefits of LGBTQ petitions to religious leaders, including meaning-making, social action, agency and empowerment.

== See also ==
- Bat Kol Religious lesbian community in Israel
- Eshel
- Havruta Religious gay community in Israel
- Judaism and sexuality
- Keshet Rabbis
- LGBT-affirming denominations in Judaism
- LGBT clergy in Judaism
- LGBT matters and religion
- LGBT rights in Israel
- List of LGBT Jews
- Same-sex marriage and Judaism
- Timeline of LGBT Jewish history
- Transgender people and religion
- Abomination (Judaism)
