= List of LGBTQ Jews =

Lesbian, gay, bisexual, transgender, and queer people of Jewish faith or descent

This is a list of LGBTQ Jews. Each person is both Jewish (by birth or conversion according to Jewish law, or identifies as Jewish via ancestry), and has stated publicly that they are bisexual, gay, lesbian, transgender, and/or queer or questioning (LGBTQ), or identify as a member of the LGBTQ community. Being both Jewish and LGBTQ is a canonical (recognized) example of some facet of each person on this list, such that the below listed person's fame or significance flows from being both Jewish and LGBTQ. New York City is home to the world's largest openly queer community.

== Academia and education ==
- Judith Butler, philosopher
- Martin Duberman, historian
- Uzi Even, Israeli chemist and former Knesset member
- Lillian Faderman, American lesbian historian
- Jack Halberstam, professor of English and director for the Center for Feminist Research at the University of Southern California
- Yuval Noah Harari, professor and author
- Magnus Hirschfeld, sexologist and activist
- Ron Huberman, Israeli-born CEO of Chicago Public Schools
- Fritz Klein, psychiatrist and sexologist
- Joy Ladin, American professor and poet, first openly transgender professor at an Orthodox Jewish institution
- Arlene Istar Lev, clinical social worker, family therapist, and educator
- George Mosse, historian
- Oliver Sacks, British neurologist, naturalist, and author
- Ludwig Wittgenstein, philosopher

== Activism and civil rights ==
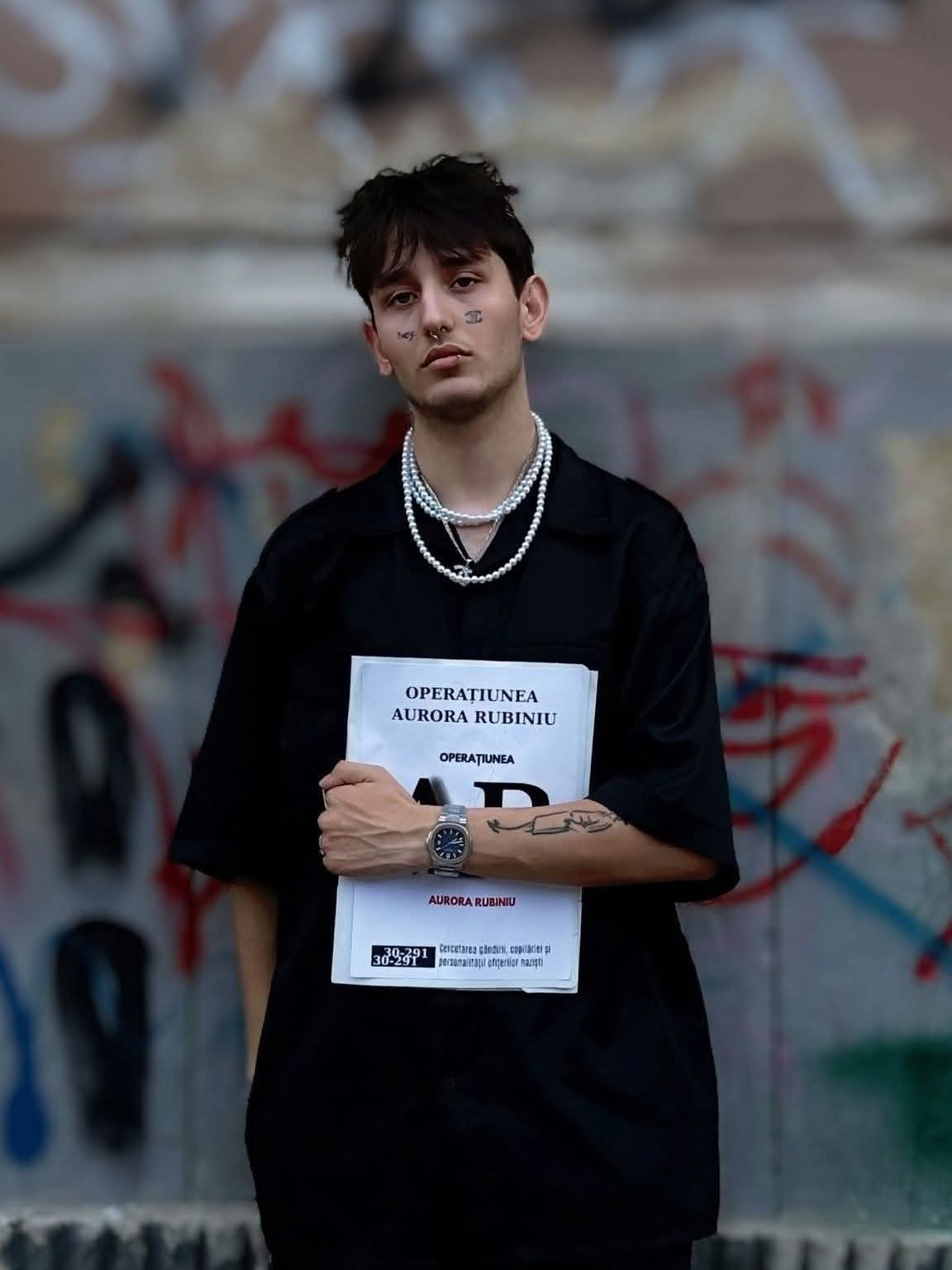
Drăgan Flaviu

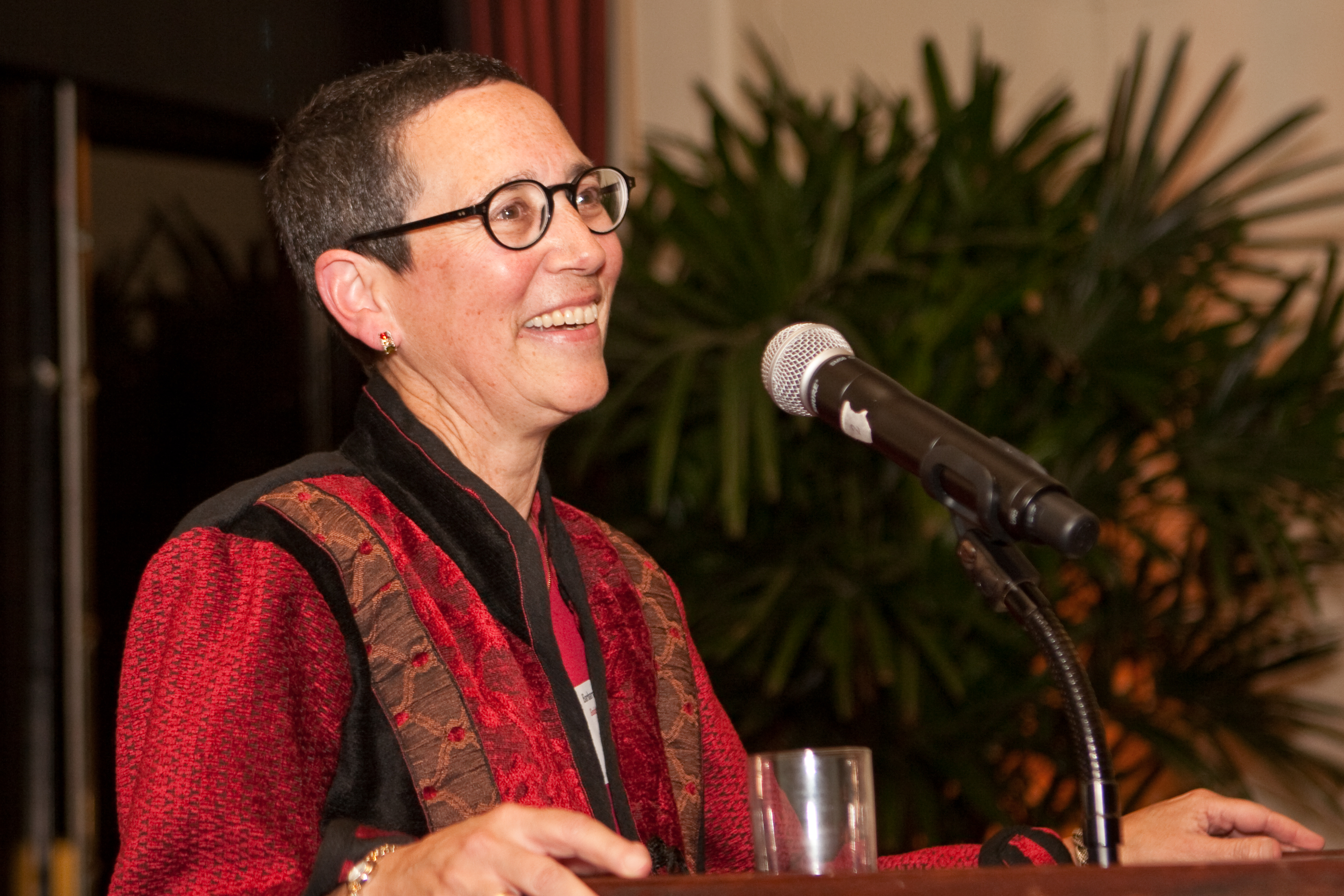
Barbara Brenner

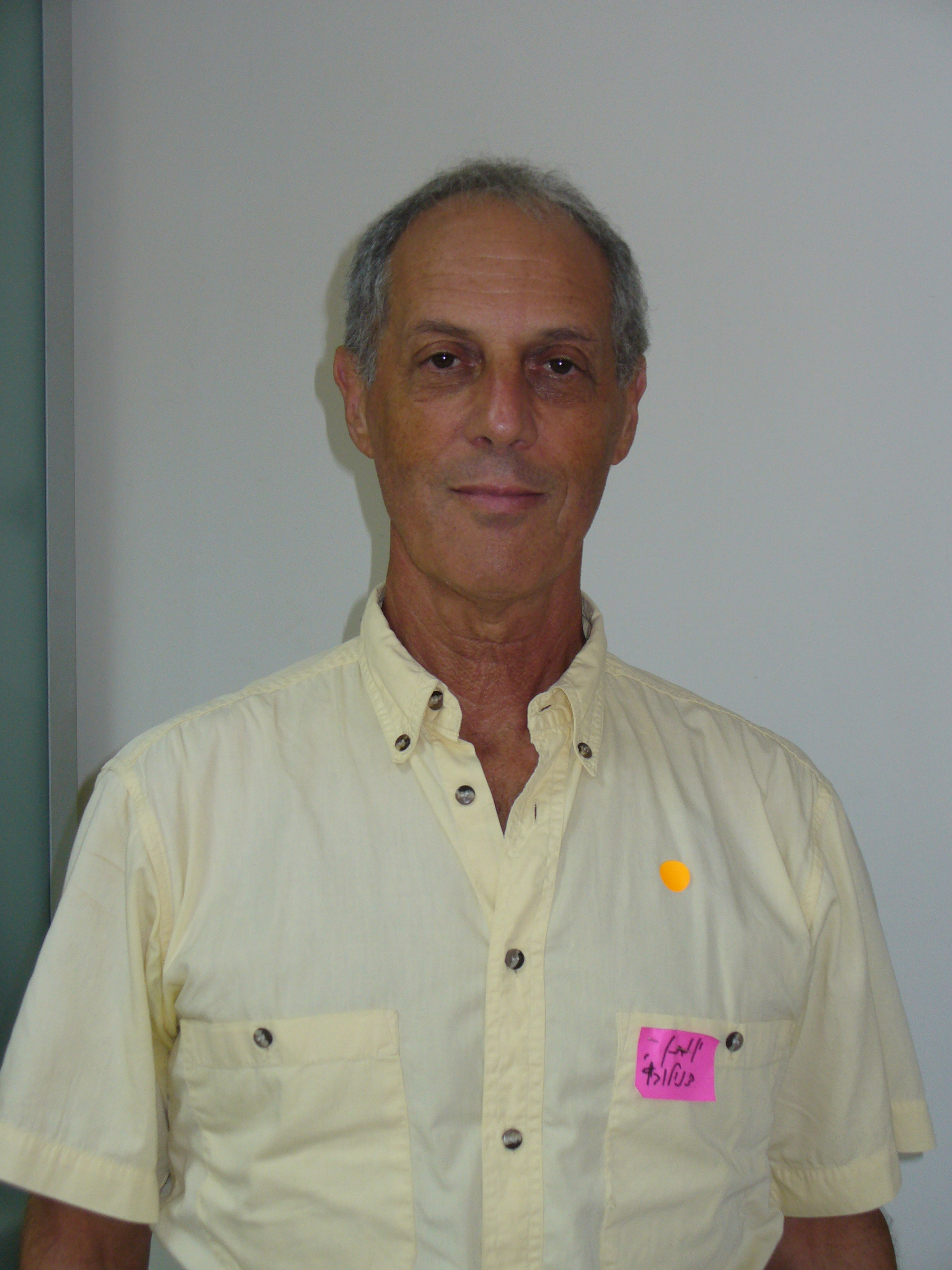
Jonathan Danilowitz

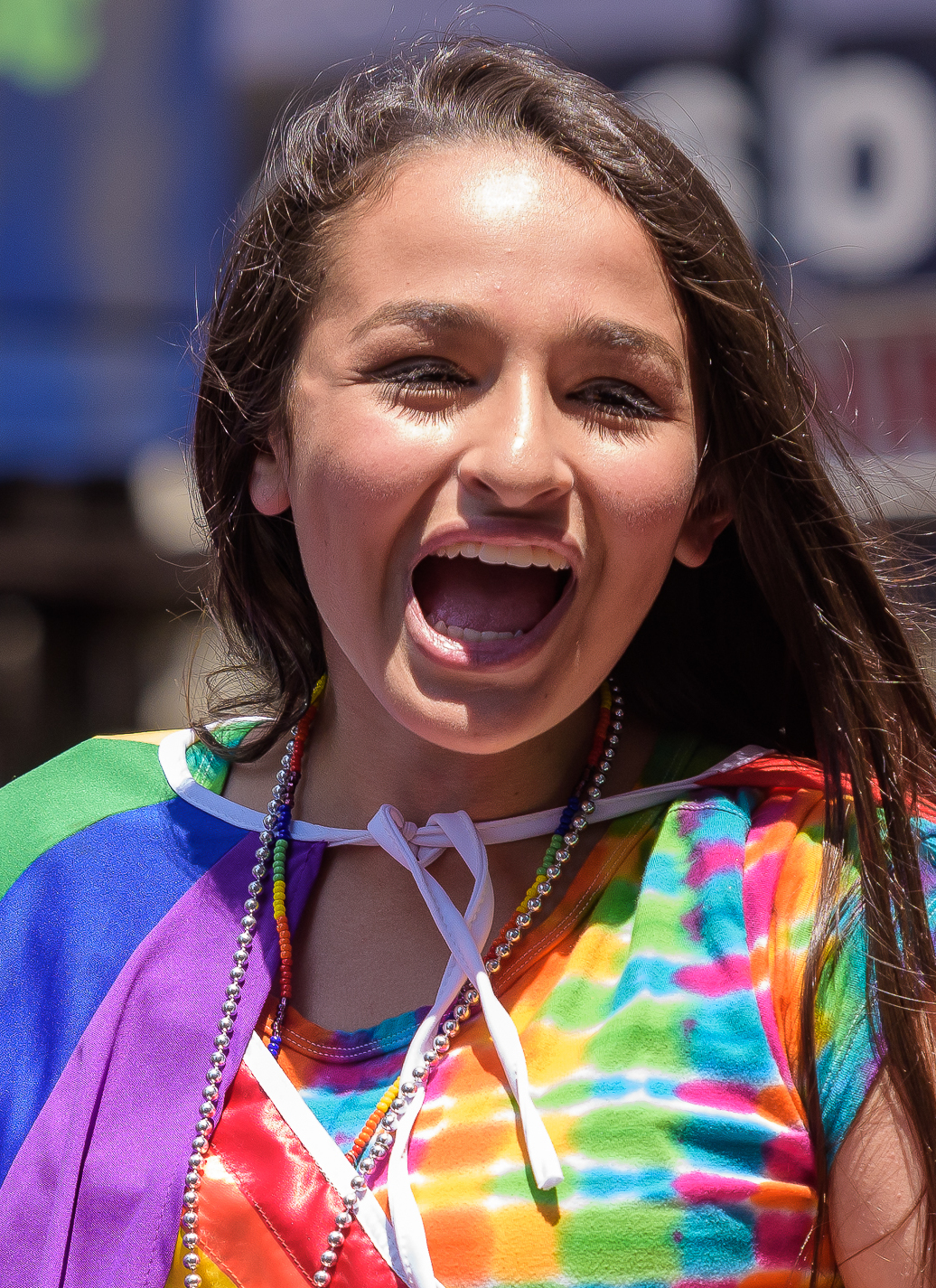
Jazz Jennings

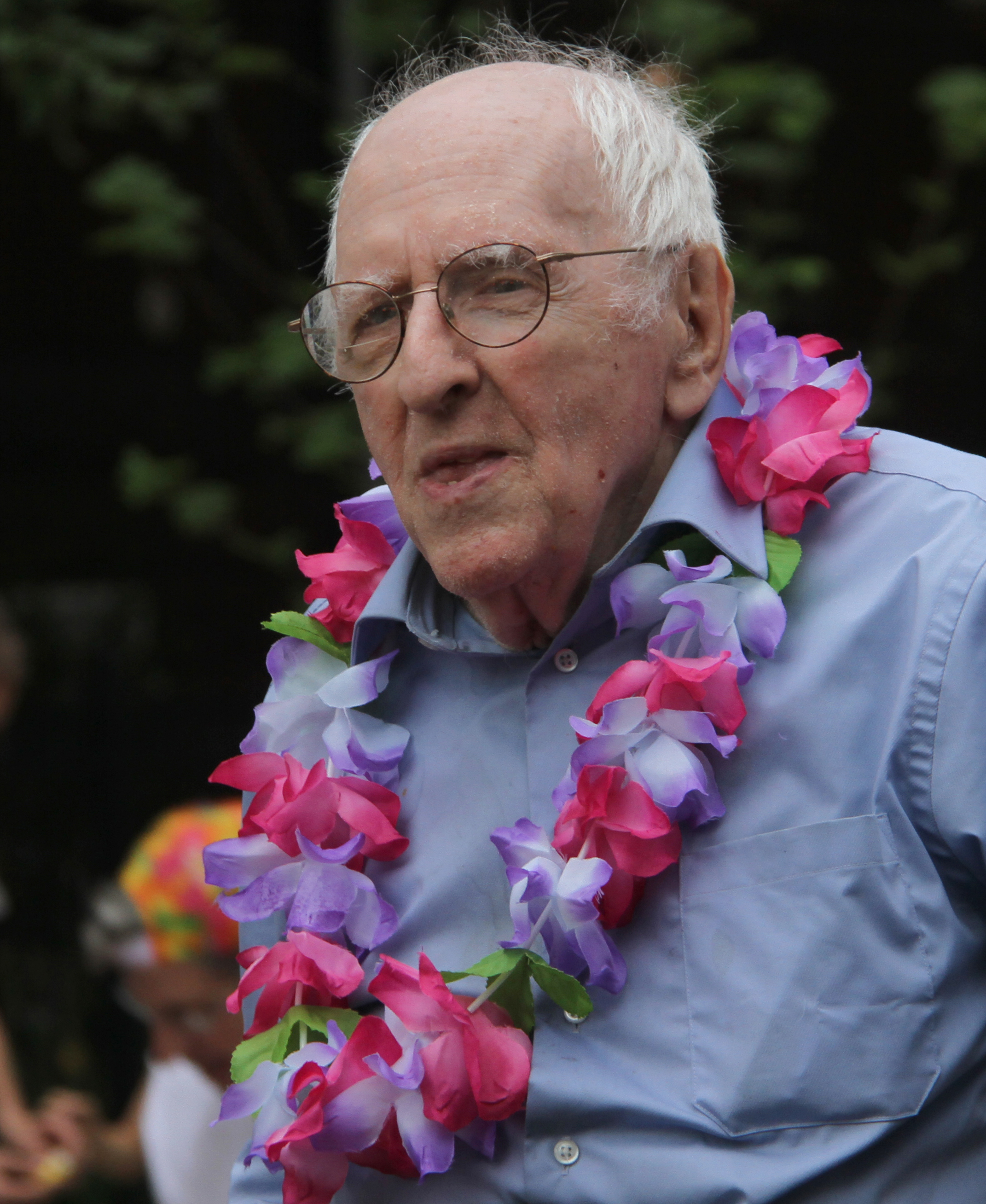
Frank Kameny

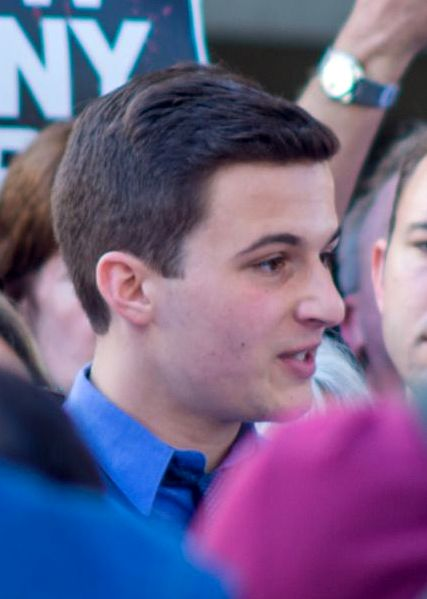
Cameron Kasky

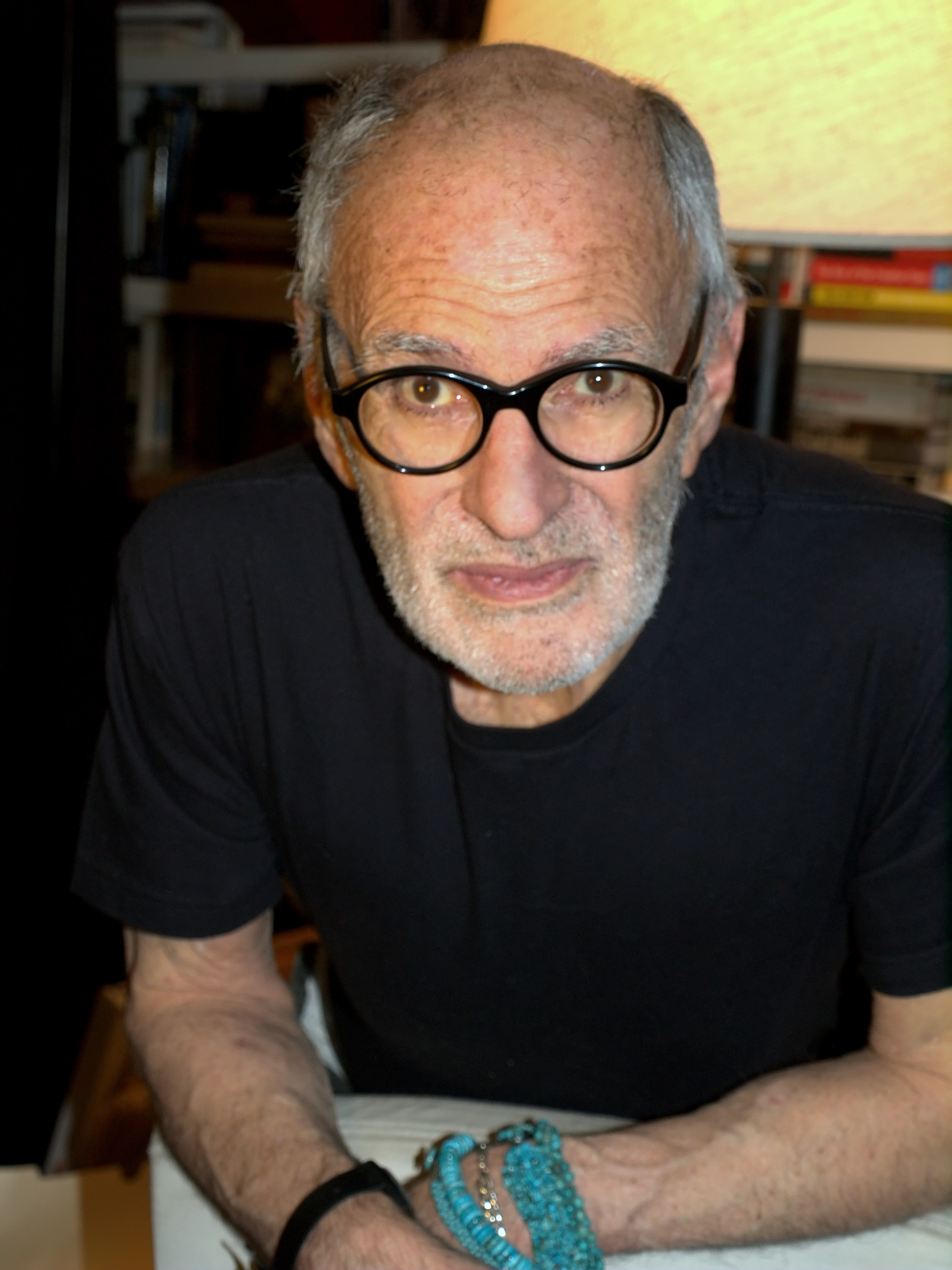
Larry Kramer

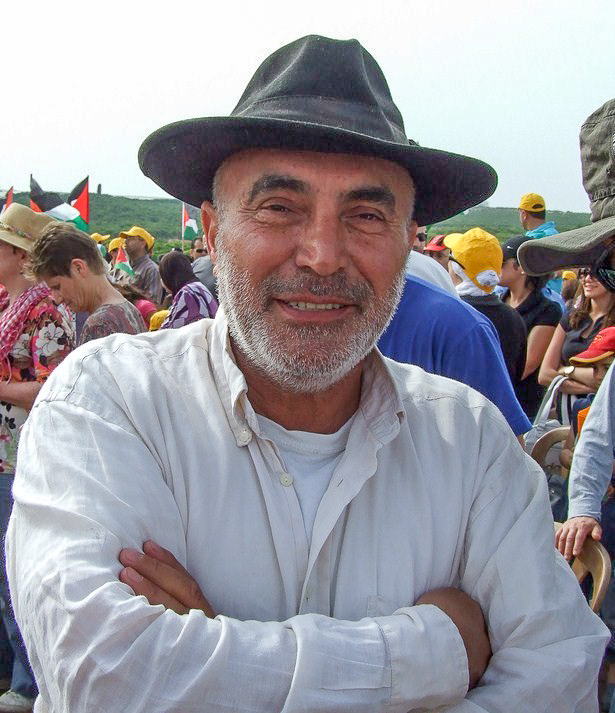
Ezra Nawi

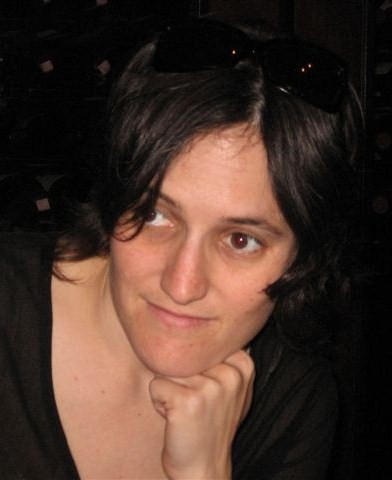
Dana Olmert

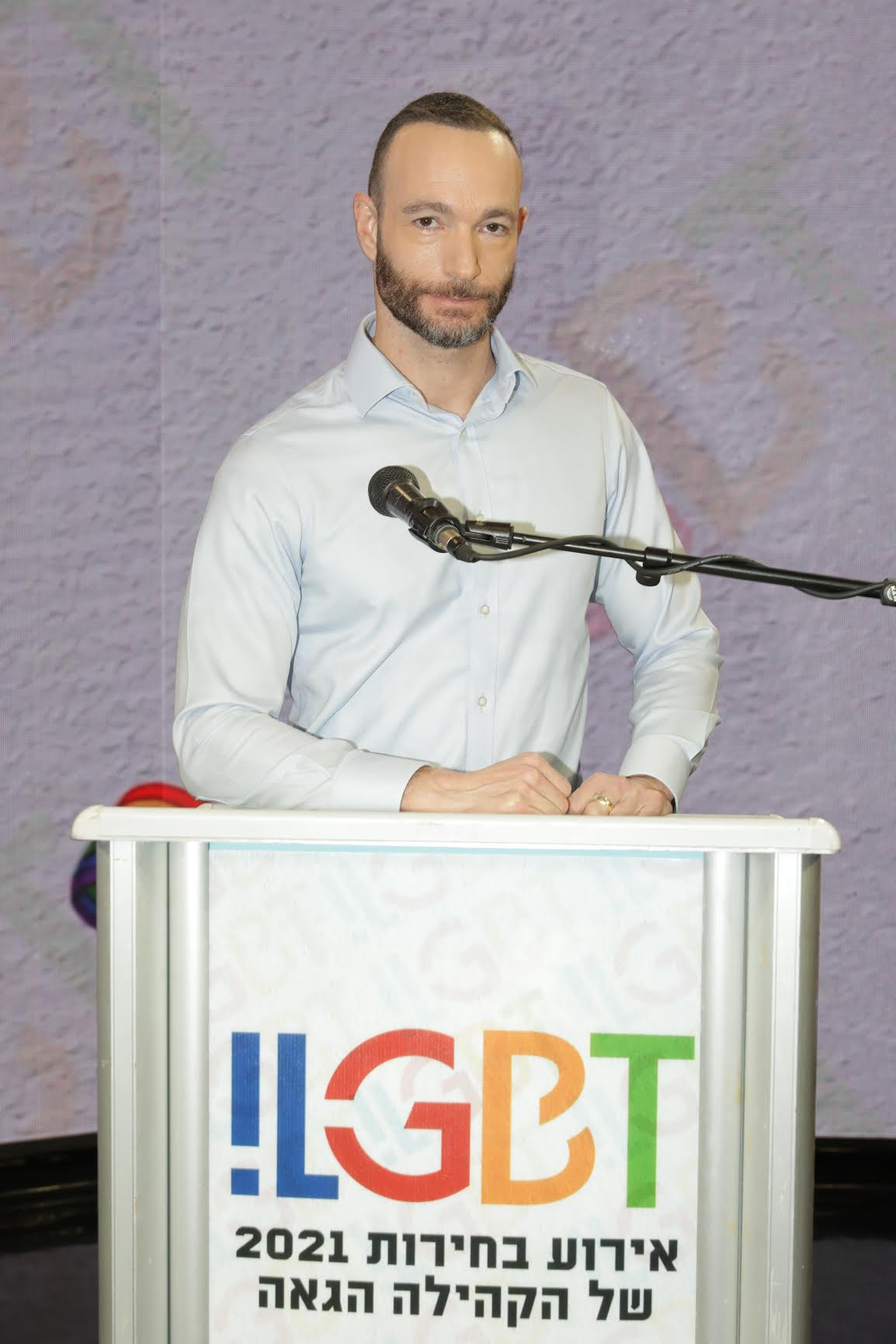
Etai Pinkas

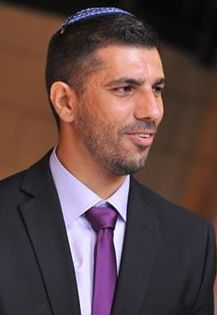
Ron Yosef

- Drăgan Flaviu, Executive Director of the research operation "Aurora Rubiniu," human rights activist, and author of the book about Nazi thinking "Lupta mea pentru viață!"
- Barbara Brenner, breast cancer activist and leader of Breast Cancer Action
- Jonathan Danilowitz, activist
- Mason J. Dunn, American lawyer, educator, and LGBTQ+ rights advocate
- Jazz Jennings, transgender activist
- Frank Kameny, prominent gay rights activist from 1957 to 2011 (born to Jewish parents but became an atheist)
- Cameron Kasky, gun control activist
- Larry Kramer, author, playwright, activist with ACT-UP
- Ezra Nawi, Israeli human rights activist
- Dana Olmert, activist
- Etai Pinkas, activist
- Riki Wilchins, activist
- Ron Yosef, activist

== Arts ==
- Yael Bartana, Israeli artist and film-maker
- Claude Cahun, French photographer and writer
- Robert Denning, American interior designer
- Yishay Garbasz, artist in photography, installation, and video
- Uri Gershuni, Israel photographer and educator
- Gluck, British painter
- Nan Goldin, photographer
- Elmyr de Hory, Hungarian-born painter and art forger
- Herbert List, photographer
- Marlow Moss, British painter
- Adi Nes, Israeli photographer
- Maurice Sendak, illustrator and author of children's books as well as costume and set designer for films, theater and opera
- Al Shapiro, artist and creator of first gay comic strip
- Simeon Solomon, painter

=== Drag performers ===
- Acid Betty, American drag queen
- Alexis Michelle, American drag queen
- Denali, American drag queen
- Flawless Sabrina, American drag queen and activist
- Jinkx Monsoon, American drag queen, winner of RuPaul's Drag Race and RuPaul's Drag Race All Stars
- Joey Jay, American drag queen
- Lil Miss Hot Mess, American drag queen
- Miz Cracker, American drag queen
- Plane Jane, American drag queen
- Sasha Velour, American drag queen and winner of RuPaul's Drag Race

=== Fashion ===
- Eliad Cohen, Israeli model and entrepreneur
- Marc Jacobs, American fashion designer
- Calvin Klein, American fashion designer
- Michael Kors, American sportswear fashion designer
- Isaac Mizrahi, American fashion designer
- Zac Posen, American fashion designer
- Arnold Scaasi, Canadian-born American fashion designer

== Film, television, and theater ==
- Chantal Akerman, film director
- Simon Amstell, comedian and television presenter
- Assi Azar, TV personality
- Neal Baer, TV writer, producer
- Orna Banai, actress, comedian
- Michael Bennett, choreographer and musical theatre director
- Alison Brie, actress, writer, producer
- Ilene Chaiken, creator of The L Word
- George Cukor, film director
- Barry Diller, media executive
- Sandi Simcha DuBowski, documentary filmmaker
- Beanie Feldstein, actress
- Harvey Fierstein, actor and playwright
- Diane Flacks, Canadian Jewish comedic actress, screenwriter and playwright
- Brandon Flynn, actor
- Eytan Fox, Israeli film director
- Stephen Fry, actor, comedian and writer
- Victor Garber, actor, comedian and writer
- Ilana Glazer, stand-up comedian, actor, writer
- Judy Gold, stand-up comedian and actress
- Julie Goldman, stand-up comedian
- Amos Guttman, film director
- Todd Haynes, film director
- Matan Hodorov, journalist, TV presenter
- Nicholas Hytner, theatre and film director
- Abbi Jacobson, comedian, actress, writer, and illustrator
- Moisés Kaufman, award-winning Venezuelan-born playwright and director, US resident
- Jessica Kirson, comedian
- Asi Levy, actress
- Dan Levy, actor, writer, and comedian
- Matt Lucas, comedian and actor
- Michael Lucas, entrepreneur, filmmaker, and pornographic film star
- Miriam Margolyes, award-winning British actress best known for her portrayal of Professor Sprout in the Harry Potter film series
- Ezra Miller, actor
- Ben Platt, actor, singer, and songwriter best known for his roles in Dear Evan Hansen, The Book of Mormon, and Pitch Perfect
- Max Rhyser, actor
- Jerome Robbins, choreographer and musical theatre director
- Lili Rosen, American actress, writer and Yiddish cultural consultant
- Joshua Rush, actor
- Jonathan Sagall, actor, director and screenwriter
- John Schlesinger, film director
- Noah Schnapp, actor
- Antony Sher, actor
- Kate Siegel, actor
- Bryan Singer, film director
- Joey Soloway, writer, director, producer, comedian
- Peter Spears, actor and film producer
- Mauritz Stiller, film director
- Jacob Tierney, Canadian actor, director, screenwriter
- Robin Tyler, comic and activist
- Gal Uchovsky, actor
- Bruce Vilanch, comedy writer and actor
- Dale Winton, TV presenter
- Evan Rachel Wood, actress, model, and musician

== Literature ==
- Leroy F. Aarons, journalist, editor, author, playwright, activist founder of the National Lesbian and Gay Journalists Association (NLGJA)
- Jon Robin Baitz, playwright and screenwriter
- Gad Beck, Holocaust survivor and author
- Steve Berman, speculative fiction writer
- Betty Berzon, author, first psychotherapist in America to come out as gay to the public (1971)
- Kate Bornstein, writer, playwright, performance artist, gender theorist
- Jane Bowles, novelist and playwright
- Alfred Chester, novelist
- Benjamin Cohen, journalist
- Nick Denton, founder of Gawker Media
- Joel Derfner, writer and memoirist
- Gabe Dunn, writer, journalist, comedian, and actor
- Elana Dykewomon, American novelist
- Eve Ensler, playwright and performer
- György Faludy, poet
- Leslie Feinberg, activist, author
- Edward Field, poet
- Sanford Friedman, novelist
- Robert Friend, poet
- Masha Gessen, journalist, author, and activist
- Allen Ginsberg, US Beat Generation poet
- Richard Greenberg, playwright
- Jacob Israël de Haan, poet
- Marilyn Hacker, poet
- Aaron Hamburger, novelist
- Max Jacob, poet
- Chester Kallman, poet and librettist
- Eva Kotchever, also known as Eve Addams, Polish feminist, writer, owner of the Eve's Hangout in New York, assassinated at Auschwitz
- Larry Kramer, playwright, author, film producer, public health advocate, LGBT rights activist, and founder of ACT UP
- Lisa Kron, playwright and performer
- Tony Kushner, playwright and screenwriter
- Arthur Laurents, playwright, screenwriter and librettist
- David Leavitt, novelist and short-story writer
- Fran Lebowitz, author and public speaker
- Leo Lerman, writer/editor
- Sue-Ann Levy, columnist
- Michael Lowenthal, novelist
- Jay Michaelson, writer, columnist, author of God vs. Gay?
- Herbert Muschamp (1947–2007), New York Times architecture critic
- Joan Nestle, writer, editor and activist, founder of the Lesbian Herstory Archives
- Leslea Newman, children's book author, short story writer, editor
- Harold Norse, poet
- Marcel Proust, novelist
- David Rakoff, essayist
- Adrienne Rich, poet and essayist
- Paul Rudnick, playwright, screenwriter and columnist
- Muriel Rukeyser, poet
- Siegfried Sassoon, poet
- Sarah Schulman, journalist, writer and playwright
- Martin Sherman, playwright
- Andrew Solomon, writer on politics, culture and psychology
- Susan Sontag, essayist and novelist
- Gertrude Stein, writer
- Julian Stryjkowski, novelist
- Bogi Takács, poet
- Paula Vogel, playwright and teacher
- Yona Wallach, poet

== Music ==
- Aderet, singer-songwriter, DJ, producer
- Howard Ashman, playwright and lyricist
- Babydaddy, member of Scissor Sisters
- Jean-Pierre Barda, singer, actor
- Madison Beer, singer, songwriter
- Frieda Belinfante, conductor (she has a Jewish father)
- Leonard Bernstein, composer and conductor
- Marc Blitzstein, composer
- Carrie Brownstein, guitarist in Sleater-Kinney
- Barbara Butch, DJ, musician
- Aaron Copland, composer
- Joel Derfner, musical theatre composer
- Brian Epstein, manager of The Beatles
- Michael Feinstein, singer and pianist
- William Finn, musical theatre composer, lyricist and librettist
- Avery Friedman, musician and singer-songwriter
- Ezra Furman, singer-songwriter
- David Geffen, film producer and record executive
- God-Des (of God-Des and She)
- Ari Gold, pop singer
- Lesley Gore, pop singer
- Amir Fryszer Guttman, singer, musician, choreographer, actor, theater director
- Lorenz Hart, lyricist
- Jerry Herman, musical theatre composer and lyricist
- Vladimir Horowitz, classical pianist
- Janis Ian (born Janis Eddy Fink), American songwriter, singer, musician, columnist, and science fiction author
- Dana International, Israeli pop singer
- Rona Kenan, musician
- Dave Koz (born David Kozlowski), jazz saxophonist
- Adam Lambert, singer and runner-up on the 8th season of American Idol
- Ivri Lider, musician, singer
- Lyrik, music producer, singer-songwriter
- Barry Manilow, singer and songwriter
- Doron Medalie, songwriter, composer
- Jon Moss, drummer, member of Culture Club and The Damned
- Offer Nissim, DJ, record producer
- Laura Nyro, singer-songwriter
- Peaches, Canadian electro-punk musician and performance artist
- Phranc, singer-songwriter
- Yehuda Poliker, singer-songwriter, musician, producer, painter
- Yehudit Ravitz, singer-songwriter, composer, record producer
- Marc Shaiman, musical theatre and film composer
- Gil Shohat, music composer, conductor and pianist
- Troye Sivan, South African-born singer and actor
- Harel Skaat, singer-songwriter
- Socalled, rapper
- Stephen Sondheim, musical theatre composer and lyricist
- Hovi Star, singer
- Michael Tilson Thomas, conductor, composer, and pianist
- Brandon Uranowitz, stage and television actor
- Yeho, singer, actor

== Politics ==
- Roberta Achtenberg, former HUD assistant secretary and San Francisco city supervisor
- Noah Arbit, Michigan state representative
- Yossi Avni-Levy, diplomat
- Tammy Baldwin, U.S. senator for Wisconsin
- Becca Balint, member of U.S. Congress for Vermont
- Sam Bell, Rhode Island Senate member
- David Cicilline, mayor of Providence, Rhode Island, member of the United States House of Representatives
- Roy Cohn, lawyer and co-counsel (with Robert F. Kennedy) to Senator Joseph McCarthy
- Bevan Dufty, former San Francisco city supervisor
- Barney Frank, Democratic member of the United States House of Representatives
- Marcia Freedman, former member of the Israeli Knesset
- Raffi Freedman-Gurspan, first transgender person to be LGBT liaison to the White House
- Ron Galperin, city controller of Los Angeles, first openly gay person elected citywide in Los Angeles
- Jackie Goldberg, former California State Assembly member for Los Angeles
- Nitzan Horowitz, Israeli Member of Knesset, first openly gay person elected to the Knesset
- Rebecca Kaplan, city councilmember at-large, Oakland, California
- Ed Koch, former mayor of New York City
- Anne Kronenberg, American political administrator
- Sheila Kuehl, former California state senator for Los Angeles
- Melissa Lantsman, member of parliament for Thornhill, Conservative Party of Canada
- Mark Leno, former California State Assembly member for San Francisco
- Mark Levine, former member of the Virginia House of Delegates
- Rafael Mandelman, San Francisco city supervisor
- Carole Migden, former California state senator for San Francisco
- Harvey Milk, former San Francisco city supervisor, first openly gay person elected to public office in the United States
- Jeremy Moss, Michigan State Senator
- Amir Ohana, first openly gay Israeli minister and Knesset speaker
- Jared Polis, first openly gay man elected to U.S. Congress (as non-incumbent) and first openly gay governor of Colorado
- Stan Rosenberg, president pro tempore, Massachusetts State Senate
- Elly Schlein, Italian politician, member of Italy's Chamber of Deputies and Secretary of the Democratic Party
- Lynn Schulman, New York City Council member
- Itzik Shmuli, politician
- Barbra Casbar Siperstein, first openly transgender member of the Democratic National Committee
- Scott Wiener, California state senator for San Francisco

== Religion ==
- Rebecca Alpert, lesbian professor in the Departments of Religion and Women's Studies at Temple University
- Lionel Blue, first British rabbi publicly to come out as gay; wrote Godly and Gay (1981)
- Deborah Brin, one of the first openly gay rabbis and one of the first hundred women rabbis
- Tadhg Cleary, the first openly gay rabbi ordained by an American Orthodox institution (Yeshivat Chovevei Torah)
- Steven Greenberg (b. 1956), first out Orthodox rabbi and staff member of CLAL
- Dario David Hunter, American-Israeli lawyer, rabbi, educator and politician considered the first Muslim-born person to be ordained as a rabbi
- Jason Klein, first openly gay man to head a national rabbinical association of a major US Jewish denominations (2013), when he was chosen as president of the Reconstructionist Rabbinical Association; also the first Hillel director to hold the presidency; as of this election, he is the executive director of Hillel at the University of Maryland, Baltimore County, a post he has held since 2006; he will be president of the Reconstructionist Rabbinical Association for two years
- Sharon Kleinbaum, first rabbi of Congregation Beit Simchat Torah, one of the most influential rabbis in the United States
- Debra Kolodny, openly bisexual American rabbi; edited the first anthology by bisexual people of faith, Blessed Bi Spirit (2000), to which she contributed "Hear, I Pray You, This Dream Which I Have Dreamed," about Jewish identity and bisexuality
- Amichai Lau-Lavie, founder of Storahtelling and Lab-Shul
- Sandra Lawson, became the first openly gay African-American and the first African-American admitted to the Reconstructionist Rabbinical College in 2011; became the first openly gay, female, black rabbi in the world in 2018
- Stacy Offner, openly lesbian American rabbi who accomplished important firsts for women and lesbians in the Jewish community; first openly lesbian rabbi in a traditional congregation; first openly lesbian rabbi hired by a mainstream Jewish congregation; first female rabbi in Minnesota; first rabbi elected chaplain of the Minnesota Senate; first female vice president of the Union for Reform Judaism; first woman to serve on the US national rabbinical pension board
- Toba Spitzer, first openly lesbian or gay person chosen to head a rabbinical association in the United States in 2007, when she was elected president of the Reconstructionist Rabbinical Association
- Abby Stein, transgender activist, former Hasidic Jew
- Margaret Wenig, American rabbi and instructor of liturgy and homiletics at Hebrew Union College-Jewish Institute of Religion; in 1976, she and Naomi Janowitz published Siddur Nashim, the first Jewish prayer book to refer to God using female pronouns and imagery; in 1990 she wrote the sermon "God Is a Woman and She Is Growing Older
- Sherwin Wine (1928-2007), rabbi and founding figure in Humanistic Judaism
- Ron Yosef (b. 1974) (Hebrew: רון יוסף), Orthodox rabbi who helped found the Israeli organization Hod, which represents gay and lesbian Orthodox Jews; his organization has played a central part in the recent reevaluation of the role of religious homosexuals in the Israeli Religious Zionist movement
- Reuben Zellman, American teacher, author, and assistant rabbi and music director at Congregation Beth El in Berkeley, California; first openly transgender person accepted to the Reform Jewish seminary Hebrew Union College-Jewish Institute of Religion in Cincinnati (2003); ordained by the seminary's Los Angeles campus in 2010

== Sports ==
- Sue Bird, American-Israeli basketball player who has won four WNBA championships (2004, 2010, 2018, 2020), four Olympic gold medals (2004, 2008, 2012, 2016), two NCAA Championships (2000 and 2002), and four FIBA World Cups (2002, 2010, 2014, and 2018)
- Robert Dover, six-time Olympic equestrian
- Fredy Hirsch, German Jewish athlete and youth movement leader known for his attempts to save children during the Holocaust
- Gili Mossinson, basketball player
- Tzipora Obziler, tennis player
- Renée Richards, tennis player

== Business, industry and labor ==
- Sam Altman, CEO of OpenAI
- Stuart Appelbaum, American trade union leader
- Yotam Ottolenghi, chef
- Joel Simkhai, Grindr founder and former CEO
- Randi Weingarten, president of the American Federation of Teachers

== Miscellaneous ==
- Felice Schragenheim, Jewish resistance fighter and Holocaust victim
- Ari Shapiro, American radio journalist

== See also ==
- Homosexuality and Judaism
- Keshet Rabbis
- LGBT clergy in Judaism
- Timeline of LGBT Jewish history
