= Gusfield =

Gusfield is a surname. Notable people with the surname include:

- Chaya Gusfield, American attorney and rabbi
- Dan Gusfield, American engineer
