= Hod (organization) =

Israeli LGBT organization for Orthodox Jews

Hod logo

Hod (Hebrew: הו"ד) is an independent Israel-based organization run by and intended for Orthodox Jewish homosexuals. It was established by the Orthodox Rabbi Ron Yosef in 2008. The organization opposes anal intercourse between men, following the prohibition in Leviticus.

Hod's goal is

... to initiate a public dialogue in the religious community, among its leaders, its rabbis, encompassing both the Halakhic and social scopes, in order to obtain recognition of religious gay men as a part of the religious community which cannot be neglected anymore. A dialogue that would lead to an improvement of the social situation of the religious homosexual man, within the religious society.

== Etymology ==
Hod (Hebrew: הו"ד, English:'Majesty'. An acronym for 'religious gays' in Hebrew) adopts its name from a social group that used to meet in Tel Aviv within the Israeli Gay, Lesbian, Bisexual and Transgender Association in the 90's. In the first decade of the 21st century it was dismantled. The name of the organization corresponds with the Hod (Majesty) Sephira (Emanation), which is connected to truth-telling.

== Formation ==
Its beginning is in the Walla's "Religious Gays" Forum. The forum was the most important site for religious gays and lesbians in Israel at the time . But with time, as the forum grew older, the tensions between the various groups that wanted to navigate the forum to different directions according to their religious perceptions, widened. Eventually it became impossible to keep the forum in its original form and it was closed. One group became the Havruta which was supported by the Jerusalem Open House, while the other group evolved to the independent organization of "Hod". The two groups strived for preservation of the religious-homosexual identity, encouraged Coming out and opposed Conversion therapy. The Hod people supported unquestioningly orthodoxy, commitment to Halakha and the importance of the discourse with rabbis and educators alike, while the Havruta people supported a change of the current situation from the field and not via rabbis, coordinating social gatherings, abstention from expressing a religious stand regarding inter-sex relationship and sexuality and participation of some of its members in the Pride parade of Israel.

Hod was established on 1 February 2008 by rabbi Ron Yosef and Itay, a religious attorney with a team of 12 that included most of the Walla! Forum and the group of "Asaf Zehavi" (an alias), a known religious homosexual activist at the time. In the same month the internet website was launched. Hod from its beginning was a voluntary organization and it is not supported financially by any rabbi or other factor, so it can remain objective and hold an independent agenda.

Hod from the start focused in discourse with rabbis and finding Halakhic and social solutions for religious gays. For example, it organized in 2008 a meeting with rabbi Yuval Cherlow with the participation of Bat Kol, educators and parents. This discourse progressed finally to the "Document of Principles" which was first published publicly in 2008.

It was decided in the first year and a half of its activity to not open another social group but to support the running group of "Asaf Zehavi". Only with the closing of Asaf's group towards the end of 2009, Hod started its organized independent social meetings, save the unique gathering it held thus far. Most its meeting till now have dealt with Brainstorming concerning the sexual orientation and the Halakha, along with holding Shabatot across the country.

Hod perceives itself as the alternative of Atzat Nefesh, and opposed loudly to its unlicensed and non-professional therapies. In the course of 2008– 2010, Hod held an extensive negotiation with a known orthodox rabbinical figure, who demanded Hod not to "disturb" the activity of Atzat Nefesh and not "attack them in the media" and also demanded that each of these organizations (Atzat Nefesh and Hod) will continue to be active without disturbance or intervention. It was suggested that each religious homosexual will go first to a conversion therapy, and those who fail will be directed to the Puah Institute to be sent to an alternative therapy or to be matched with a woman and those fail that will be directed to Hod. Hod refused these demands and they named them "issuing a Kosher religious gay certificate".

In 2011 Hod was registered as an official society at the Fellowship Societies Registrar of Israel.

== Activity ==
Throughout the years Hod focused on education and advocacy with the Ministry of Education, Ministry of Health and IDF. Hod met with psychologists and social workers, ran lectures and conversations with educators and pedagogical advisors in schools. Hod wrote together with professions, rabbis, psychologists and social workers different advising documents that serve as practical auxiliary tools. In 2012 a study Eve was held for Haredi social workers and for the first time a communication channel was opened with different Haredi rabbis. In the same year a committee of expert psychologists on behalf of the "Israel Psychologists Association" (IPA) on the subject of conversion therapies as a result of Hod's address to the Ministry of Health (Israel) and to the IPA. The Abundance of information and complaints concerning conversion therapies and the warning Hod published as a result of the journalistic investigation of the Uvda ("Fact") Television Program (regarding the Atzat Nefesh's therapies which employs unlicensed caregivers as demanded by the Israeli law and which use non-scientific and non-based methods) is what brought this committee. The committee stated that the chances of success of these therapies are very low and might cause damages, but stressed that the researches done in this matter are problematic since this issue was not investigated properly due to political correctness. In the same year Hod held an advertising campaign against conversion therapies and for self-acceptance of the religious homosexual community in Israel.

In June 2014, following Hod's request, the Israeli Union of Social Workers decided to adopt the position paper of the Israeli Psychologists Association concerning conversion therapies. They also stated that no proof was found for the success of these therapies, where the damages they might create are well known: depression, self-hatred and on extreme cases even suicide. In October 2014 the Israeli Ministry of Health adopted the Psychologist Association's stance as well as a result of Hod's address.

== Goals ==
Hod tries to reconcile the sexual orientation of its members with their religious beliefs. It does so by emphasizing the difference between homosexual orientation and homosexual acts. Rather, the organization intends to offer support and to stimulate social contact between religious homosexuals, as to diminish the feelings of loneliness frequently experienced by these individuals.

Hod is a house for orthodox religious homosexual Jewish men in Israel and across the world who are dealing with their sexual orientation. Hod hold occasionally get-togethers and social activities. These meetings serve as a peer-support and aid group.

Hod was created out of the need of religious homosexual men to keep their Halakha-abiding religious identity and at the same time have a healthy life in which their sexual preference is expressed.

Hod is interested in creating among the Torah observant public and its leaders a public, Halakhic and social discourse which should bring to the recognition in religious homosexuals as an existing phenomenon within the religious society. Hod frequently organizes meetings and lectures by Orthodox Rabbis. Throughout the years, such discourse was held with Rabbi Ratson Arusi, Rabbi Shlomo Aviner, Chief Military Rabbi Avichai Rontzki, Rabbi Yisrael Rozen, Rabbi David Stav, Rabbi Eliyahu Aberjil and MK Moshe Feiglin. The purpose of the discourse is to bridge over the opposing stances under the spirit of tolerance and equality and through this to improve the existential and social state of a religious homosexual in the religious society, turn for the better (Tikkun olam) the Jewish Israeli society, disseminate pro-tolerance education and acceptance of the other through the guidance of educators, psychologists and scholars. Hod is also active in the eradication of hatred and intolerance towards any homosexuals.

Hod supplies without any prejudicial bias a respond, attentive ear, support and preliminary counseling to a wide spectrum of religious homosexuals. According to Hod's reports during the 5 years it exists, it received over 6,000 internet and phone inquiries, which include adolescents, married homosexuals, mentally stressed to suicidal homosexuals etc. Hod's Hotline is the only existing multi-category alternative to that of Atzat Nefesh.

Hod established a special staff of religious psychologists, authorized by law, who help and give mental support to religious men seeking for counseling and help in the complicated process they go through. In addition other counseling documents were written along with educators, psychologists and social workers. Hod published a few counseling documents such as "Ahavat Nefesh" booklet which deals with the religious and social difficulty of religious homosexuals and calls for solutions for them by the rabbinical establishment; the "Spiritual Counseling Document to the Religious Adolescent"; "Faithful Jew Document" which presents the outlines of the religious way of the homosexual etc.

Hod also works within ultra-Orthodox society, in which thousands of its sons suffer inadequate treatments and attempts to convert their sexual orientation while distorting Halakha and Judaism. Hod holds hundreds of testimonies of men who have tried to change along the years and suffered damages as a result.

== Views ==
- Hod opposes anal intercourse between men, as specified in the Torah.
- Hod embraces the stand of Israel Psychologists Association (IPA) and the American Psychological Association (APA) which determined conversion therapies cause damage and lack a scientific basis. Therefore, there is no Halakhic base to such treatments.
- Hod sees a relationship between men a valid option for a homosexual. Such relations are not a violation of the Halakha, considering the existing prohibitions.
- Hod opposes participation of religious people in the Pride Parade, and also sounded its criticism against the participation of other religious organizations in the parade.
- Hod encourages coming out of the closet.
- Hod opposes same-sex marriage carried by the religious establishment, but supports civil agreements which supply civil right equality by the state.
- Hod opposes marriage of a homosexual with a woman who doesn't know of his sexual orientation or of a homosexual who has no compatibility to sustain a proper and loving marital relationship.

== Rabbi Ron Yosef ==
Rabbi Ron Yosef, who leads the organization, was initially known publicly only by his first name, thereby showing the delicate situation of homosexuals in the Jewish Orthodox community in Israel. However, In April 2009, he became the first Israeli orthodox Rabbi to come out, by appearing in Uvda ("Fact"), Israel's leading investigative television program .

== Document of Principles ==
In an open letter distributed to Orthodox community leaders, the organization appealed to the Orthodox community to recognize them as part of the religious society. This was sent to over 100 rabbis in 2008, and eventually was known as the "Document of Principles":

1. There is no unequivocal evidence for any theory that seeks to explain the causes of homosexuality. A certain percentage of the population in any society is deeply convinced of their homosexual orientation, without being able to change it. There are also cases of people who have made great efforts to change, but did not succeed.
2. In the present reality, the struggle of a homosexual person brings with it considerable psychological difficulties. Consequently, one can advise a person who is interested in doing so, to consult a certified professional mental health worker, on condition that complete information is provided about the type of treatment, its chances of success and its risks. No treatment should be seen as either ultimate or exclusive.
3. A homosexual man may not be coerced into marriage, since marriage provides no inherent solution to a person struggling with his sexuality. Encouraging a homosexual man to marry without explicitly divulging his orientation is a transgression of the Halachic prohibition 'Thou shalt not put a stumbling block before the blind', and a moral injustice towards the spouse. One's capacity to marry does not only include a readiness to fulfill the commandment of "Be fruitful and multiply" but also the suitability to manage a healthy and moral relationship with one's spouse.
4. One who blames or insults homosexuals on account of their orientation is in violation of commandments governing interpersonal relationships – "bein adam lachaveiro".
5. On the condition that he does not publicize his actions, a person who has transgressed the prohibition of homosexual intercourse should not be cast out from the religious community. Homosexual activity (as opposed to the homosexual orientation itself) is prohibited absolutely by the Torah. For homosexuals, this prohibition represents a trying ordeal that must be overcome.
6. A person's Halakhic obligations in the realm of interpersonal relations apply equally to his or her behavior towards a homosexual person, and it is strictly forbidden to express hatred or violence towards him. He should be acknowledged as a full member of the religious community, be it in making up a minyan (prayer quorum), delivering the Priestly Blessing, being called up for a blessing on the Torah or being recognized as a valid witness – in these and in any other matter he should not be treated differently from any other person.
7. Homosexuals should be part of the community alongside the rest of the Jewish people. Nonetheless, it is of great importance to set up support groups for homosexuals, and such organizations are to be considered charity organizations. If a homosexual person has a close friend or relative who he can confide in for help and support, it is desirable for him to do so. A religious homosexual man should be encouraged to observe Jewish law in its entirety, even if he fails in one specific commandment. An 'all or nothing' policy is opposed to the way of Halakha. Every Jewish person should try to keep all the commandments and should do everything he or she can to be as observant of the Torah as possible.
8. In the same way that every person worships God in his or her own distinctive manner, so too every homosexual individual will deal with their sexuality and the problems it raises in a way best suited to them and their unique personality and set of circumstances.
9. A homosexual who does not get married should be encouraged to study the Torah and fulfill all the commandments, those governing both interpersonal relationships and those governing one's relationship with G-d. Similarly, he should be supported to develop his various strengths to devote them to the greater goals that God has set the Jewish people. It is desirable to consult a Rabbi in this matter.

Up to 2013, 163 Orthodox rabbis from Israel and abroad have signed this statement, among them: rabbi Yuval Cherlow, rabbi Binyamin Lau, rabbi Haim Navon, rabbi Daniel Sperber, rabbi Eliezer Melamed, rabbi Shai Piron and rabbi Yehuda Gilad.

Hod promotes advocacy actions focused on disseminating the "Document of Principles", which its main innovation lies in the call to separate the prohibited deed from the person and his sexual orientation.

== See also ==
- Homosexuality and Judaism
- Timeline of LGBT Jewish history
- Havruta religious non-orthodox gay men in Israel
- Bat Kol religious lesbian community in Israel
- Atzat Nefesh
- Trembling Before G-d
