= Lori Klein =

Lori Klein may refer to:

- Lori Klein (politician), American politician
- Lori Klein (rabbi), American rabbi and former attorney
