= Atzat Nefesh =

Israeli conversion therapy organization

Atzat Nefesh (Hebrew: עצת נפש; English: Psychological Advice) is an Orthodox Jewish conversion therapy organization based in Israel that promotes sexual orientation change efforts.

== History ==
Atzat Nefesh was founded in 2001 by Rabbi Shlomo Aviner. Specifically, it addresses homosexuals, victims of sexual abuse, and people who are addicted to masturbation, pornography, or prostitution.

Atzat Nefesh operates support groups and a hotline staffed by volunteers with a yeshiva background. The organization believes that with the proper treatment it is possible to change sexual behavior and sexual orientation. Atzat Nefesh upholds the view that by strengthening the masculinity of homosexuals, they will discover their hidden, inborn heterosexuality. To that purpose it organizes three day long workshops, called "Journey to masculinity". The organization directs its applicants to therapists who use conversion therapy methods.

== Controversy ==
The Israel Ministry of Health in October 2014 adopted the position paper of the Israel Psychological Association which prohibits the use of conversion therapy, as advocated by Atzat Nefesh, and warned the public about such treatments.

In March 2015, Israeli blogger and gay rights advocate Natan Azulay went undercover to receive “conversion therapy” from Atzat Nefesh, and then published a report on the Israeli website Mako. Azulay's report indicates that Atzat Nefesh continues to refer people to uncredentialed “therapists” whose training is questionable and who are not considered mental health professionals.

In 2015, chairman Reuven Israel Welcher was criminally charged with sexually assaulting conversion therapy patients. In 2020, he was sentenced to three years in jail, more than the state prosecutor's requested two-year sentence. Atzat Nefesh has not apologized to the Welcher's victims.

== See also ==
- Jews Offering New Alternatives for Healing
