= Shlomo Aviner =

Israeli Orthodox rabbi, born in France

Rabbi Shlomo Aviner הרב שלמה חיים הכהן אבינר
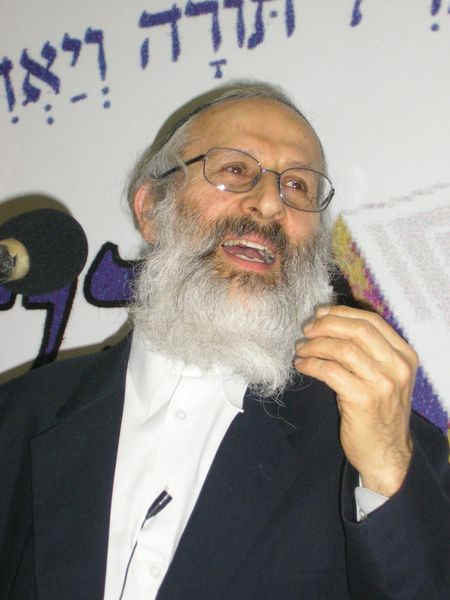
- Title: Rabbi of Beit El

Personal life
- Born: Claude Langenauer; 1943 (age 82–83) Lyon, France

Religious life
- Religion: Judaism
- Denomination: Orthodox

Jewish leader
- Position: Rosh yeshiva
- Yeshiva: Ateret Cohanim

Shlomo Chaim Hacohen Aviner (Hebrew: שלמה חיים הכהן אבינר; born 1943/5703 as Claude Langenauer) is an Israeli Orthodox rabbi. He is the rosh yeshiva (dean) of Ateret Yerushalayim (formerly Ateret Cohanim) and the former rabbi of Beit El, an Israeli settlement. He is considered one of the spiritual leaders of the Religious Zionist movement.

== Early life ==
Shlomo Chaim Ha-Cohen Aviner was born in 1943 in German-occupied Lyon, France. As a child, he escaped the deportations to Nazi death camps, being hidden under a false identity. As a youth in France, he was active in Bnei Akiva, the Religious Zionist youth movement, eventually becoming its National Director. He studied mathematics, physics, and electrical engineering at the Superior School of Electricity.

At the age of 23, infused with the idea of working the Land of Israel, Aviner made aliyah to Sde Eliyahu, a kibbutz near Beit She'an. He then went to learn at Yeshivat Mercaz HaRav in Jerusalem, where he became a leading student of Zvi Yehuda Kook, the rosh yeshiva (dean) and son of Israel's first chief rabbi Avraham Yitzchak HaCohen Kook. During this time, Aviner served as a soldier in the Israel Defense Forces (IDF), participating in the Six-Day War and the Yom Kippur War, earning the rank of lieutenant. At Kook's direction, he joined a group that was settling Hebron, and learned Torah there.

== Career ==
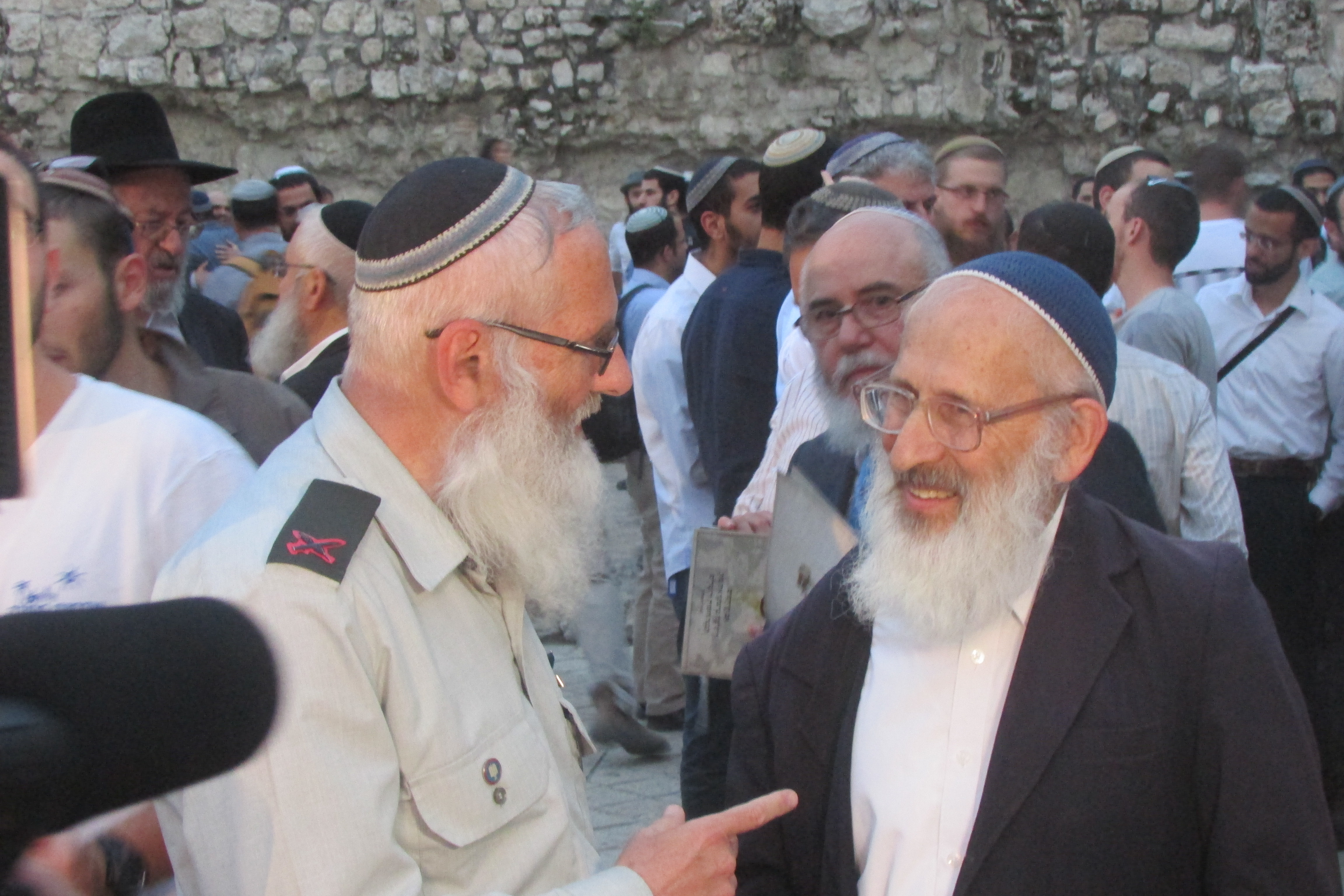
Rabbi Shlomo Aviner (r.) with Rabbi Eyal Krim

In 1971, Aviner became the rabbi of Kibbutz Lavi in the Lower Galilee, where he spent half of his day working on the farm. A number of years later, he left Lavi to serve as the rabbi of Keshet, an Israeli settlement in the Golan Heights.

In 1981, Aviner accepted the position of rabbi of Beit El (Aleph), in the Binyamin region of the Shomron, a position he held until 2013. In 1983, he also became the rosh yeshiva of the newly-established Yeshivat Ateret Cohanim (later named Ateret Yerushalayim). Located in the Old City of Jerusalem, it is the closest yeshiva to the Temple Mount. The yeshiva has produced rabbis, teachers, educators, and IDF officers, while promoting the building and settling of Jews in Jerusalem.

== Controversies ==
Aviner's outspoken views have provoked controversy. In the wake of Pope John Paul II's visit to Bethlehem in 2000, during which he announced that the Vatican had always recognized "Palestinian national rights to a homeland", Aviner said that the pope's goal was simply to obtain a foothold for the Catholic Church in Jerusalem.

Aviner has been accused of sexual abuse. Some of these accusations were published in Maariv. The newspaper appointed an arbitrator Professor Nathaniel Laor, who in his position as a public figure and not in his professional capacity as a psychiatrist, determined that "the central characteristic in the matter was communication deficiencies stemming from the absence of close professional guidance in the mental health field" adding that "he should not be accused of sexual harassment but rather be criticized for entering the professional field without support." The public prosecutor closed the investigation due to "lack of guilt."

Aviner is a founder of Atzat Nefesh, an organisation that promotes conversion therapy for homosexuals, which he is a strong proponent of. Despite the Israel Ministry of Health's rejection of conversion therapy as pseudo-science, Aviner has said that he will continue to refer homosexuals to the organisation.

In 2005, prior to the forced mass eviction of Jews from Gush Katif as part of the Israeli disengagement from Gaza, he took a rabbinical stance that soldiers deployed to the scene should not refuse orders. He explained that the religious issue was the state's responsibility, not the individual's. Aviner opposed the resistance to the eviction plans, in one case getting physical with a protester. In 2007, in an article about Baruch Marzel's threats regarding repeated attempts by the Israeli government to evacuate Homesh, Aviner shared his view that the IDF was correct in its reasoning to remove the latest wave of settlers and demonstrators from the site of the abandoned settlement in order to protect them from future terrorist attacks. He made a distinction between the IDF's responsibility to protect settlements and its responsibility to protect demonstrators, saying that while the IDF should use any means at its disposal to protect a settlement and keep it intact, including using armed forces, it should nevertheless evacuate demonstrators if that is deemed necessary to protect their lives.

In 2009, a booklet drawing on Aviner's teachings entitled, "Go Fight My Fight: A Daily Study Table for the Soldier and Commander in a Time of War", was published especially for Operation Cast Lead. Its existence was revealed by Breaking the Silence, a group of Israeli ex-soldiers who accused Aviner of encouraging them to disregard the international laws of war aimed at protecting civilians. Some have interpreted the booklet as advising soldiers that cruelty is sometimes a "good attribute". In December 2010, in the wake of a controversial rabbis' letter spearheaded by Shmuel Eliyahu forbidding the renting of homes to Arabs in Israel, Aviner endorsed the initiative.

In 2012, Aviner presented a religious ruling that women in Israel should not run for parliament for reasons of modesty. Other religious authorities, notably Yuval Cherlow, immediately rejected the ruling.

After the Notre-Dame de Paris fire occurred in April 2019, Aviner made comments to the effect that the event could have been divine retribution for the burning of numerous copies of the Talmud in 1242, an outcome of the Disputation of Paris.

== Works ==
Aviner has published around 150 books. Some of the more notable ones are:

- Sichot Ha-Rav Tzvi Yehudah - talks by Rav Tzvi Yehudah Kook
- Tal Hermon - on the weekly Torah portion and holidays
- Shu"t She'eilat Shlomo - his multi-volume responsa
