= Ron Yosef =

Israeli rabbi

Ron Yosef רון יוסף
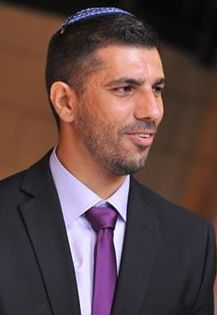
- Yosef in 2013

Personal life
- Born: September 30, 1974 (age 51)
- Occupation: Sofer

Religious life
- Religion: Judaism

Jewish leader
- Residence: Netanya, Israel

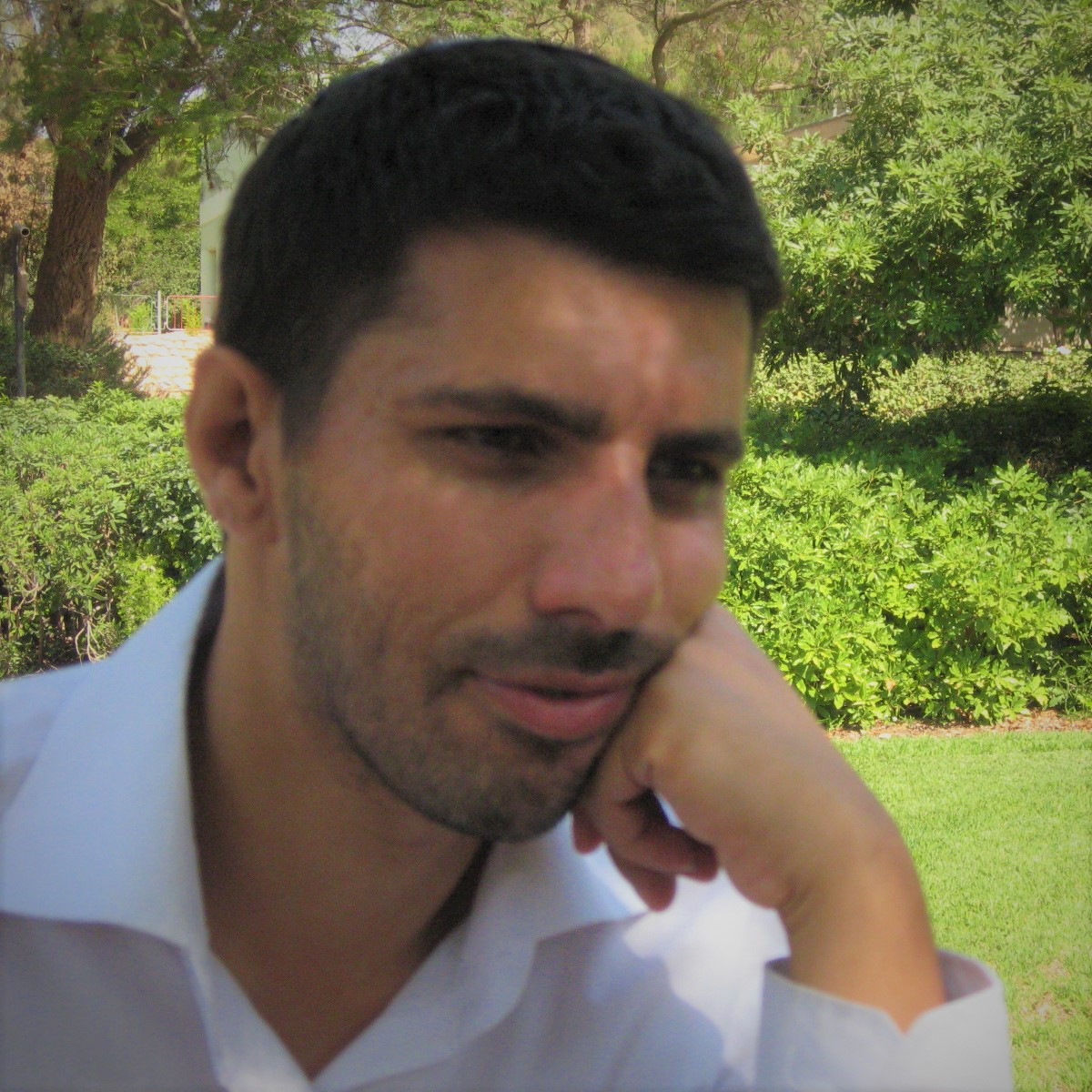
Yosef in 2009.

Ron Yosef (Hebrew: רון יוסף) is the founder of the Israeli organization Hod, which represents Israeli gay and lesbian Orthodox Jews. His organization has played a central role in the recent reevaluation of the role of religious homosexuals in the Israeli Religious Zionist movement.

== Biography ==
Born into a traditional Adeni Yemenite family in 1974, Yosef began to become aware of his sexual identity in his early twenties, if not earlier. During his time in the IDF, Yosef served in the Adjutant Corps and the Medical Corps. Coming out at 21, he moved in with a now-deceased grandmother who provided love and support. He at first left his faith behind, moving to Tel Aviv. However he soon returned to traditional Judaism, continuing his studies in yeshiva and eventually obtaining semichah. A June 2013 article reported that Yosef lives with his partner, who is also Orthodox, although the two men don't make public appearances or go out together.

== Rabbinic career ==
For many years Ron Yosef served as a rabbi in Netanya, concealing his sexual orientation. In 2004-2005, he worked with the Association for Society and Culture, a Netanya-based organization devoted to the preservation of the Yemenite Jewish heritage. He is certified to practice before rabbinic courts in family law and is a trained Torah scribe.

== Gay activism ==
Yosef was a member of the Walla's Religious Gays Forum. On February 1, 2008, 12 people banded together with Yosef and a religious attorney named Itay, launching Hod, an internet website whose name draws on an affinity to the Kabbalistic Sephira Hod or "Majesty" (Hebrew: הו"ד). The name is connected mystically with truth-telling. From its inception, Hod has been a voluntary association and accepts no outside financial support.

From the start, Yosef led the organization, although he was initially known only by his first name due to the sensitivity of the subject of homosexuality in the Jewish Orthodox community in Israel. However, in April 2009, he became the first Israeli orthodox Rabbi to come out, by appearing in Uvda ("Fact"), Israel's leading investigative television program. Yosef remains in his position as a pulpit rabbi. His congregation remains supportive of him and his work with HOD, but, Yosef freely admits that the younger members of his flock were much easier to convince that nothing had changed in his relationship to them or his commitment to halakha than the older members.

Yosef received death threats in the year leading up to the 2009 Tel Aviv gay centre shooting. He says the community did not initially accept his identity, particularly the older generation, but he was strengthened and supported by the young people. Yosef is proud that HOD has been able to reach out to over 6,000 religious gays and 163 Orthodox rabbis from Israel and abroad have endorsed HOD's 2008 "Document of Principles", which calls on Jews to separate the prohibited sexual acts from the person and his/her sexual orientation.

In December 2012, the IDF's Military Rabbinate rejected a request by Yosef to address Haredi and Religious troops despite over 100 requests from gay troops to Hod for help. This decision was reached despite the fact that least 37 of these requests came from within the Military Rabbinate itself. According to the chief military rabbi's assistant, "at such delicate times, in which the Military Rabbinate is in the eye of many storms and is strictly examined in every move it takes, there is a problem allowing a person like Rabbi Ron Yosef to enter IDF bases...."Even if there is no fundamental problem with his opinions and conduct, the Military Rabbinate is not interested in provoking public rows which may be sparked following his lectures in IDF bases." Given the fact that the Rabbinate had allowed various rabbis to address many hundreds of troops during the previous year——including speakers critical of Israeli and policy and some who harangued troops to disobey orders, this decision created controversy. The Israel Gay Youth (IGY) Movement released a report that year stating that at least half the homosexual soldiers who serve in the IDF suffer from violence and homophobia. At the time IGY's head stated that "I am happy to say that the intention among the top brass is to change that."

== Views and opinions ==
On homosexuality in Judaism he says: "It is clear to me that lying with another man is forbidden, and our starting point is commitment to halacha, the Torah. The goal is not to seek permission. But you need to give us a shoulder and support." Regarding conversion therapy, Yosef states that "...it is possible to sustain a religious life even with a homosexual orientation [without conversion therapy]", although all options "...should be examined." On attempts to pair religious gay men with lesbian women, Yosef stated that "What they did is problematic. Presenting it as the main option is wrong. It must be stressed that there are several solutions, and that each person should find the suitable way for himself. However, the initiative does include a positive aspect – that finally people are not trying to conceal and ignore the issue."

== See also ==
- Homosexuality and Judaism
- Judaism and sexuality
- LGBT clergy in Judaism
- LGBT rights in Israel
