= Abomination (Judaism) =

Offense against the religious senses of a people

In Judaism, an abomination, horror, or scandal is, in general, an offense against the religious senses of a people, and, in particular, an offense against the religious sense of the Jewish people. An abomination offends God (i.e., it is a sin) because it is offensive on religious grounds. The translation of the Hebrew word for abomination is actually the translation of three different levels or kinds of abominations in terms of severity: toebah, sheḳeẓ, and piggul. While abomination refers mostly to violations of the Mosaic law, specifically violations of the mitzvot on the worship of God in Judaism, it also includes some violations of the moral law (lying, perversion, etc.).

== Origins ==
Some Jewish scholars believe the three levels of abomination were not developments in Jewish theology, but originated all in the Ketuvim, from which the Torah and the Nevi'im borrowed, while other Jewish scholars believe the three levels of abomination were developed over time after the Babylonian captivity.

== Toebah ==
Toebah or to'eva (abominable or taboo) is the highest level or worst kind of abomination. It includes the sins of idolatry, placing or worshiping false gods in the temple, eating unclean animals, magic, divination, perversion (incest, pederasty, homosexuality and bestiality), cheating, lying, killing the innocent, false witness, illegal offerings (imperfect animals, etc.), hypocritical offerings (seeking atonement without repentance), and offending the religious sense of another people (for example, the Israelites sacrificing cattle, eating bread, and shepherding sheep were abhorrent to the ancient Egyptians). Some of the listed sins warranted the death penalty, under specific conditions, in Judaism until the death penalty was effectively abolished in Judaism by or at the time of the destruction of the second temple.

== Shekez ==
Shekez or sheketz (detestable or loathsome) is the middle level or kind of abomination. It includes the sins of idolatry and eating unclean animals. Oftentimes in the Bible shekez is used interchangeably with toebah.

== Piggul ==
Piggul (unclean or putrid) is the lowest level or least kind of abomination. In the Bible it refers to the sin of illegal offerings. In rabbinic literature it refers to the sin of hypocritical offerings.

== Contemporary Jewish views ==
In contemporary Judaism, there are mixed views on all of the aforesaid. Some Jews do not expect to return to making animal offerings, express a wide variety of views on sexual ethics, including homosexuality, some see no contradiction between being a Jew and disbelieving in God, some believe lying is not intrinsically wrong, and some do not follow the dietary laws.

== See also ==
- Abomination (Bible)
