= Keshet Rabbis =

Organization of Conservative/Masorti rabbis

Keshet Rabbis is an inclusive organization of Conservative/Masorti rabbis, cofounded in 2003 by Menachem Creditor, which holds that gay, lesbian, bisexual and transgender Jews should be embraced as full, open members of all Conservative congregations and institutions. Based on its understanding of Jewish sources and Jewish values, it asserts that LGBT Jews may fully participate in community life and achieve positions of professional and lay leadership.

The organization was established in order to connect gay-friendly Conservative rabbis with one another, to serve as a collective voice of gay-friendly Conservative rabbis, and to offer a point of contact for Conservative/Masorti Jews who are themselves LGBT or who care about LGBT issues.

Keshet Rabbis provides LGBT Jews and those who love and support them with the means to contact a Conservative rabbi for positive and sympathetic advice and information. The mandate of the organization's rabbis is to provide judgment-free support and advice to those who approach them in the following areas: a listening and sympathetic ear, personal counseling in absolute privacy, halakhic queries, ceremonies of interest to the LGBT community, congregations that are already gay-friendly, referrals to helpful resources within the greater Jewish community and all similar matters.

In addition to rabbis, cantors are joining to give support in a similar manner. Further there is now a move towards Keshet congregations.

== Status ==
Keshet Rabbis is not an official arm of the Rabbinical Assembly and is not endorsed by it; rather, it is a free association of rabbis who are members of the Rabbinical Assembly and who subscribe to Keshet-Rabbis' rationale and objectives. The organization's website was effectively launched on June 27, 2005, and soon after its creation over 100 rabbis had joined it.

== See also ==
- Homosexuality and Conservative Judaism
- Keshet
