= Lori Klein (rabbi) =

American rabbi

Rabbi Lori Klein
- Born: Lori Diane Klein
- Occupation: Attorney
- Known for: Lesbian Rabbi ordained by the Jewish Renewal movement

Lori D. Klein is an attorney known for being one of the two first openly lesbian rabbis ordained by the Jewish Renewal movement. Klein and Chaya Gusfield were ordained at the same time in January 2006.

Klein serves as an oncology hospital chaplain at Stanford University Medical Center.

She was chair of the Board of Directors of ALEPH: Alliance for Jewish Renewal from 2009 to 2012.

Klein is a Jewish community activist. She lives in Santa Cruz, California. Klein used to be an attorney, but no longer has an active law license in California. Klein graduated from the University of Pennsylvania Law School in 1985.

== See also ==
- Timeline of women rabbis
