= Jason Klein =

American rabbi (born 1975)

Jason Gary Klein
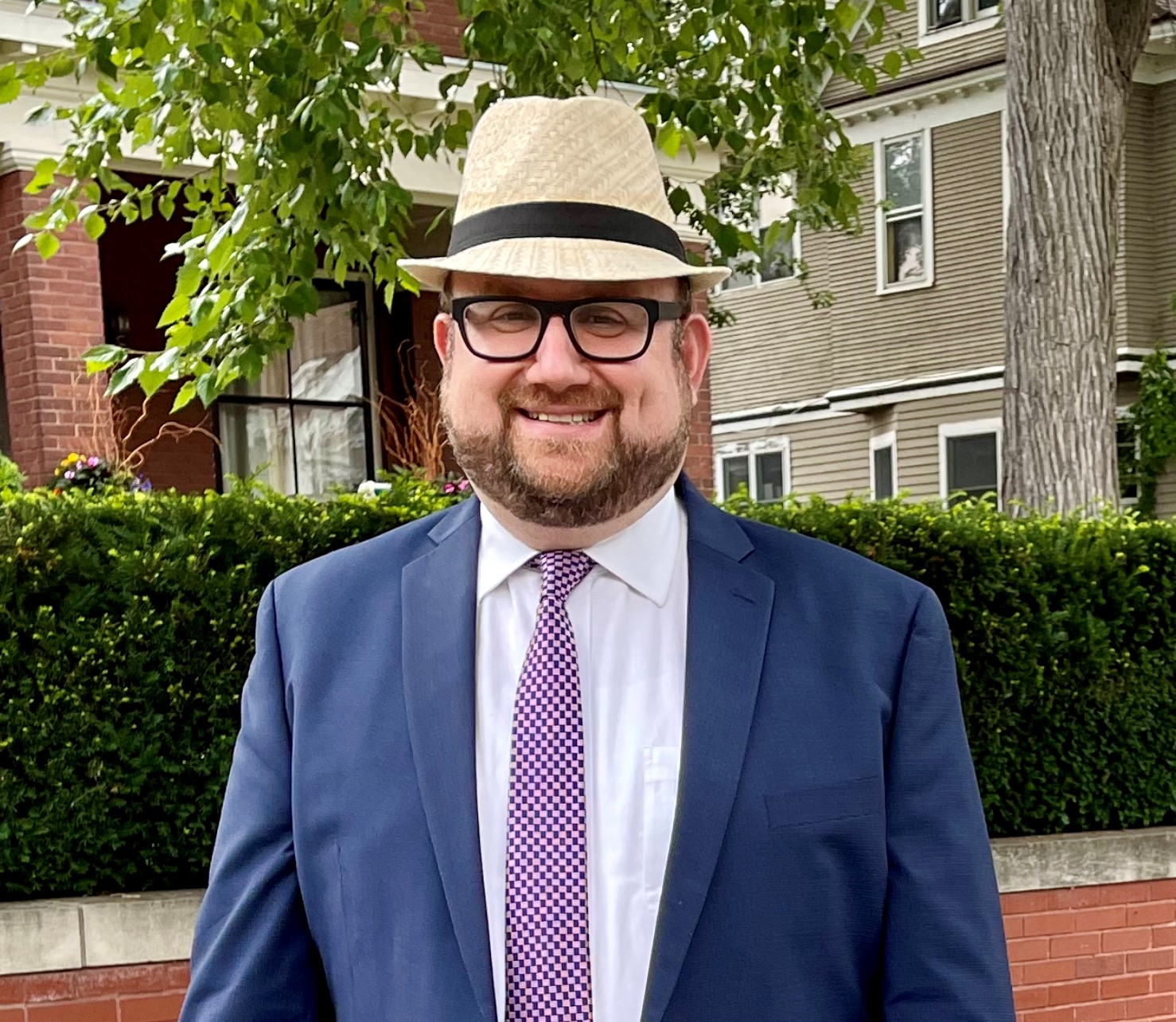
- Born: Jason Gary Klein; May 14, 1975 (age 51); New York City
- Education: Columbia University (BA in Religion, 1997); Reconstructionist Rabbinical College in Wyncote, Pennsylvania (ordained rabbi 2002)
- Occupation: Rabbi

Rabbi Jason Klein became the first openly gay man chosen to head a national rabbinical association of one of the major Jewish denominations in the United States in 2013, when he was chosen as president of the Reconstructionist Rabbinical Association. He was also the first Hillel director to hold the presidency, the chief volunteer position of the organization. As of his election as president, Klein was the executive director of Hillel at UMBC, the University of Maryland, Baltimore County, a post he held from 2006 until 2013. He served as president of the Reconstructionist Rabbinical Association for two years—until 2015. In July 2013 he became the Director of the Center for Jewish Life at JCP Downtown, the Jewish Community Project of Lower Manhattan, where he served until 2018.

Beginning in 2018, Klein served on the clergy and executive team of Temple Israel, Minneapolis, as the Director of Lifelong Learning at Temple Israel, Minneapolis.

Klein served for one year as the campus rabbi and Associate Chaplain of the University for the Jewish Community at Brown University in Providence, Rhode Island.

Klein served Senior Rabbi of Congregation Beit Simchat Torah as its Senior Rabbi from 2024 to 2026, leading the community through a time of transition.

Klein grew up in East Brunswick and Montclair, both in New Jersey, graduated from Columbia University in 1997, and was ordained by the Reconstructionist Rabbinical College in 2002. He lives in Manhattan.

== Writing ==
- "Hanukkah" in A Guide to Jewish Practice: Volume 2 -- Shabbat and Holidays (Teutsch), 2014
- "Parashat Bo" in Torah Queeries (Drinkwater et al.), 2009
- "Queer Ritual on Campus" with Rabbi Mychal Copeland in The Hillel LGBTQ Resource Guide, 2007
- "How I’m thinking about Hanukkah when Israel is at war — and campus tensions are high" for "Jewish Telegraphic Agency", 2023

== Teaching, media, and public appearances ==
- Greetings, Inauguration of Rabbi Deborah Waxman, 2014
- Contributor, My Fellow American (is Muslim) Project,
- "Beshalach," Torah Talk, Jewish Journal
- Park Avenue Podcast, "How We Talk About Judaism" pilot
- Selected Podcasts, Temple Talks
