= Chaya Gusfield =

American rabbi and attorney

Chaya Gusfield is an American, Northern California attorney, known for being one of the two first openly lesbian rabbis ordained by the Jewish Renewal movement. Gusfield and Rabbi Lori Klein were ordained at the same time in January 2006.

Gusfield was a legal services lawyer, and director of a community mediation program prior to joining the rabbinate. She is the Assistant Rabbi and B'nei Mitzvah Coordinator for Beth Chaim Congregation in Danville, California. Prior to this, she served as one of the Spiritual Leaders for the Renewal Synagogue in Alameda County, California, and as the program director for Kol Shofar, a Conservative Synagogue in Tiburon, California. Gusfield graduated from the New College of California with an LL.B.

She and her partner live in Oakland, California with their daughter Yeshi.

== See also ==
- Timeline of women rabbis
