= Marc Lieberman =

American ophthalmologist (1949–2021)

- Born: Marc Frank Lieberman; July 7, 1949; Baltimore, Maryland, U.S.
- Died: August 2, 2021 (aged 72); San Francisco, California, U.S.
- Occupations: Ophthalmologist, humanitarian

Marc Frank Lieberman (July 7, 1949 – August 2, 2021) was an American ophthalmologist and humanitarian.

== Biography ==
He was born Marc Frank Lieberman on July 7, 1949, in Baltimore, in a Reform Jewish household. Both his brother and an uncle became rabbis while his father was an ear-nose-and-throat doctor.

Lieberman attended Reed College in Portland, Oregon where he majored in religion and studied pre-Biblical Canaanite languages. After college he lived in Israel for a time where he married an Israeli woman, Alicia Friedman, and had a son. He took pre-med classes at Hebrew University of Jerusalem. Upon returning to the United States, Lieberman attended Johns Hopkins University and became an ophthalmologist with a focus on glaucoma with a practice in San Francisco.

In 1982, Lieberman met Nancy Garfield at a yoga class and she introduced him to the Buddhist community of the Bay Area. Lieberman and Garfield would eventually marry.

Lieberman considered himself a Jubu and was a leader in the lay Buddhist community in the Bay Area.

When the Dalai Lama was going to visit the United States in 1989 he desired to learn more about Judaism. A friend of Lieberman in the office of California Democratic Representative Tom Lantos reached out and asked Lieberman to assist. Lieberman was instrumental in arranging an historic dialogue between Jewish leaders and the Dalai Lama putting together what he termed a "dream team" of rabbis and Jewish scholars for the one-day meeting. The following year, Lieberman accompanied eight other members of the "dream team" to Dharmsala for a four-day discussion of the two faiths. One member of the group, Rodger Kamenetz, went on to author The Jew in the Lotus about the discussions.

Lieberman was also part of the group which invited monastics to found a monastery in California which eventually became Abhayagiri Buddhist Monastery.

In 1995, Lieberman founded the nonprofit Tibet Vision Project to help restore sight to Tibetans with blindness. Lieberman traveled to Tibet twice a year to run mobile eye camps and by 2005 had trained 20 Tibetan surgeons and restored sight to more than 2,000 people. Within 20 years, the Tibet Vision Project had restored sight to over 5,000 people.

In 2006, a documentary about his work entitled Visioning Tibet was released.

On August 2, 2021, Lierberman died from prostate cancer.
