= Jewish Buddhist =

Person with a Jewish background who practices a form of Buddhism

A Jewish Buddhist is a person of Jewish ethnicity who practices a form of Buddhism, with or without simultaneously observing Judaism.

Some practice forms of dhyana, Buddhist meditation, chanting, or spirituality. An individual may identify with both Judaism and Buddhism in terms of their religious practices. In many instances, the person may be ethnically designated as Jewish while practicing Buddhism as their primary religion. In the 1994 book The Jew in the Lotus, Rodger Kamenetz introduced the term JewBu or JUBU. Similarly, many also use the terms BuJews or BuddJews to refer to themselves.

== Demographics ==
In her 2019 book on the subject entitled American JewBu, Emily Sigalow surveys the demography of Buddhism in the United States, estimating ethnically Jewish Buddhists comprise between 16.5% and one-third of all non-Asian American Buddhists.

== Origins ==
At the 1893 Parliament of the World's Religions, a Jewish man named Charles Strauss declared himself a Buddhist following talks delivered by Buddhist delegates Soyen Shaku and Anagarika Dharmapala.

In the late 1960s, following the rise of Zen within the Beat Generation, many Jews began to explore Buddhism. Key figures included Shinge-shitsu Roko Sherry Chayat, a Zen Buddhist; Joseph Goldstein, Jack Kornfield, and Sharon Salzberg—founders of the Theravada-based Insight Meditation Society; and Sylvia Boorstein, who teaches at Spirit Rock Meditation Center. They primarily practice Vipassana meditation as taught by Thai teachers. Another generation of Jewish Buddhist teachers emerged in the early 2000s.

== Notable people ==
- Alfred Bloom
- Bhikkhu Bodhi
- Sylvia Boorstein
- Shinge Roshi Cherry Chayat
- Thubten Chodron
- Leonard Cohen
- Surya Das
- Ram Dass
- Mark Epstein
- Anthony Ervin
- Zoketsu Norman Fischer
- Allen Ginsberg
- Philip Glass
- Tetsugen Bernard Glassman
- Natalie Goldberg
- Joseph Goldstein
- Julius Goldwater
- Daniel Goleman
- Yuval Noah Harari
- Dan Harris
- Zenkei Blanche Hartman
- Goldie Hawn
- Jon Kabat-Zinn
- Ayya Khema
- Jack Kornfield
- Jay Michaelson
- Ethan Nichtern
- Mandy Patinkin
- Jeremy Piven
- Linda Pritzker
- Nick Ribush
- Jonathan F.P. Rose
- Larry Rosenberg
- Sharon Salzberg
- Morrie Schwartz
- Nyanaponika Thera
- Helen Tworkov
- Mel Weitsman
- Adam Yauch
- Shinzen Young

== See also ==
- Buddhism in Israel
- List of American Buddhists
- Jews and Buddhism
- List of converts to Buddhism
- Buddhism and Judaism
