= Kamenetz =

Kamenetz may refer to:

- Kamianets-Podilskyi, a city in southwestern Ukraine
- Anya Kamenetz, American writer
- Rodger Kamenetz, American writer
- Kevin Kamenetz (1957-2018), American politician and lawyer
- Dov Kamenetz, Brazilian entrepreneur
- Solange Kamenetz Szwarcbarg, French fine art painter
