= Lazaretto (novel) =

2019 novel by Shay K. Azoulay

- Cover of first edition
- Author: Shay K. Azoulay
- Original title: לזארטו
- Translator: Shay K. Azoulay
- Cover artist: Kristina Mordukhovich
- Language: Hebrew
- Publisher: Pardes Publishing
- Publication date: 2019
- Publication place: Israel
- Media type: Print
- Pages: 233
- ISBN: 9781618384997

Lazaretto is a novel written by the Israeli author Shay K. Azoulay, published in 2019 by Pardes Publishing. Inspired by Albert Camus's The Plague, the novel takes place in the near future, where the city of Tel Aviv is cut off from the rest of Israel and its residents are forced to fend for themselves. A review in Haaretz described the novel as “an ambitious, high-tension novel, seeped in paranoia... Lazaretto is a disturbing and stirring dystopia which haunted me while I was reading it and even after I'd finished.” The novel was also named "Book of the Year" by LaIsha magazine and dubbed "the novel that predicted the pandemic"
