= Anya Kamenetz =

American journalist

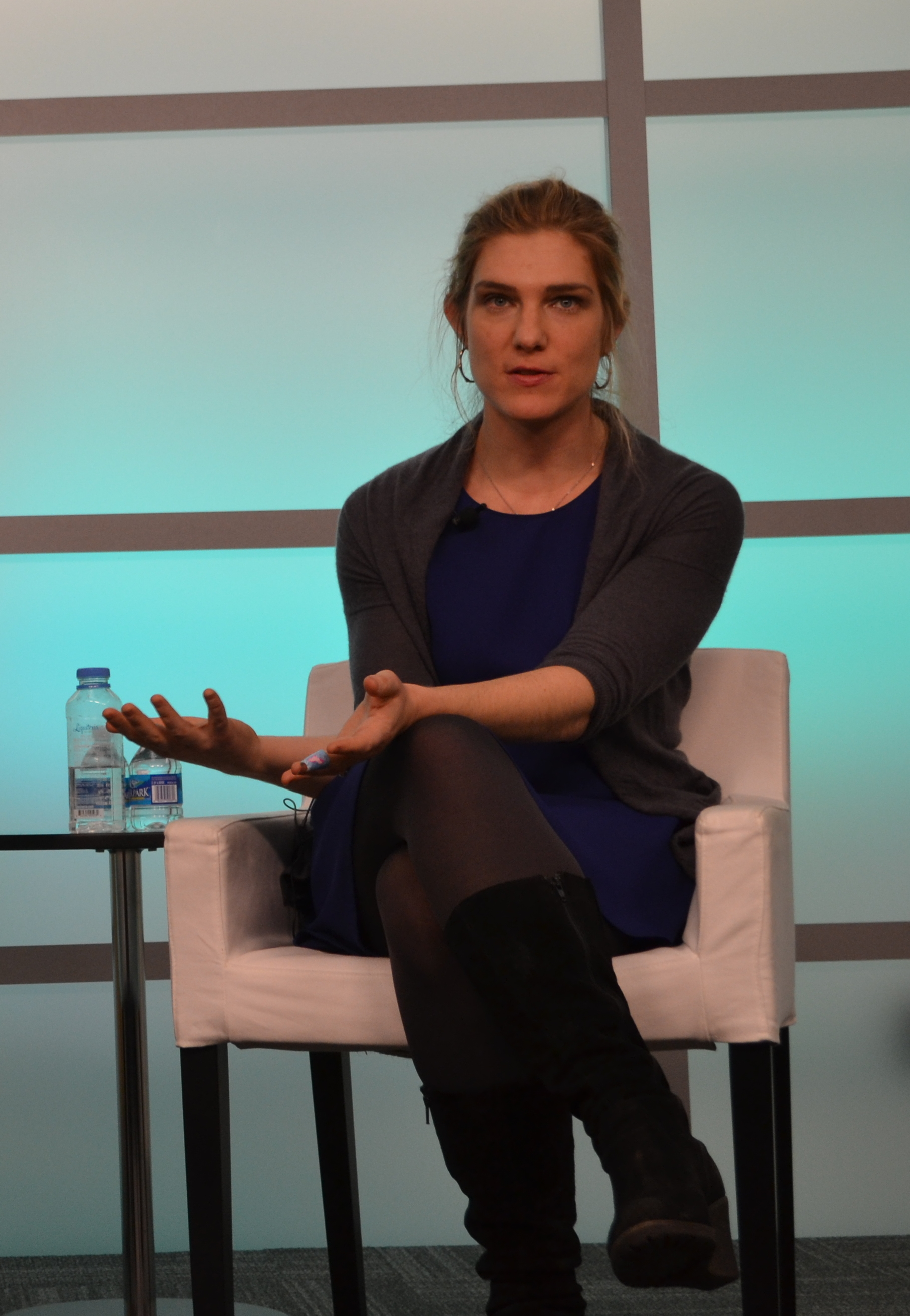
- Born: September 15, 1980 (age 45); Baltimore
- Education: Benjamin Franklin High School
- Alma mater: Yale College
- Occupation: Writer
- Relatives: Rodger Kamenetz, Moira Crone
- Writing career
- Language: English
- Notable works: Generation Debt, DIY U: Edupunks, Edupreneurs, and the Coming Transformation of Higher Education, The Test: Why Our Schools are Obsessed with Standardized Testing–But You Don’t Have to Be, The Art of Screen Time: How Your Family Can Balance Digital Media and Real Life The Stolen Year: How Covid Changed Children's Lives, and Where We Go Now

Anya Kamenetz (born September 15, 1980) is an American writer living in Brooklyn, New York City. She has been an education correspondent for NPR, a senior writer for Fast Company magazine, and a columnist for Tribune Media Services, and the author of several books. She is currently a senior advisor at the Aspen Institute.

During 2005, she wrote a column for The Village Voice called "Generation Debt: The New Economics of Being Young". Her first book, Generation Debt, was published by Riverhead Books in February 2006. Her writing has also appeared in New York Magazine, The New York Times, The New Yorker, The Washington Post, Salon, Slate, The Nation, The Forward newspaper, and more.

In 2009, Kamenetz wrote a column called "How Web-Savvy Edupunks Are Transforming American Higher Education" and, in 2010, a book on the subject entitled DIY U: Edupunks, Edupreneurs, and the Coming Transformation of Higher Education. In 2010, she was named a Game Changer in Education by the Huffington Post.

As a Fellow at the New America Foundation, Kamenetz wrote a book, The Test: Why Our Schools are Obsessed with Standardized Testing–But You Don’t Have to Be, which was released in January 2015.

She was featured in the documentaries Generation Next (2006), Default: The Student Loan Documentary (2011), both shown on PBS, and Ivory Tower, which premiered at Sundance in 2014 and was shown on CNN.

Her book, The Art of Screen Time: How Your Family Can Balance Digital Media and Real Life was published by PublicAffairs, and imprint of Hachette, in January 2018. It argues that families should manage screen time with rules similar to Michael Pollan’s well-known “food rules”: "Enjoy Screens. Not too much. Mostly with others."

Her book The Stolen Year: How Covid Changed Children's Lives, And Where We Go Now, was published by PublicAffairs, an imprint of Hachette, in 2022.

She is the daughter of Rodger Kamenetz, poet and author of The Jew in the Lotus and other books on spirituality, and Moira Crone, painter and fiction writer and author of Dream State and A Period of Confinement. Kamenetz grew up in Baton Rouge and New Orleans and graduated from Benjamin Franklin High School and Yale College in 2002.

== Reviews of Generation Debt ==
Generation Debt argues that student loans, credit card debt, the changing job market, and fiscal irresponsibility imperil the future economic prospects of the current generation, which is the first American generation not to do better financially than their parents.

Some critics of Generation Debt have held that Kamenetz is not critical enough of her own perspective. Daniel Gross of Slate wrote, "It's not that the author misdiagnose[s] ills that affect our society. It's just that [she] lack[s] the perspective to add any great insight."

== Reviews of The Test ==
In The New York Times Book Review, Dana Goldstein wrote, "Although “The Test” mounts a somewhat familiar case against standardized testing, to characterize it as simply a polemic would be to overlook the sophistication of Kamenetz's thinking."

In The Boston Globe, Richard Greenwald wrote, "The value of Anya Kamenetz’s new book, “The Test,” lies in her ability to avoid the soapbox style of too many books on education reform today. Her journalistic talents coupled with her role as a mother of a student on the brink of testing humanizes this book, making it a perfect entry for parents who are too deep in the muck of testing to have the clarity of distance."
