= Buddhist Geeks =

Buddhist podcast, magazine and conference

Buddhist Geeks is a podcast, online magazine, and annual conference with a primary focus on American Buddhism. It was established in 2006 by Vince Horn and Ryan Oelke. Past guests have included Brad Warner, Shinzen Young, and B. Alan Wallace.

Jack Kornfield's comment on the first Buddhist Geeks conference was: "It's clear that the electronic virtual interconnected web and the online world is the wild way that the Dharma stream is flowing, and the geeks have their minds dialled into the revolutionary next generation." In 2012, Vincent Horn and Rohan Gunatillake were featured in Wired UK's Smart List 2012.

== History ==
Founders Vince Horn and Ryan Oelke noticed there was little in the media specifically addressing the interests of Westerners in Buddhism and decided to create a podcast to fill the gap. It first appeared in 2007. Horn and Oelke were Religious Studies students of Naropa University, a Buddhist-inspired liberal arts college in Boulder, Colorado. Gwen Bell joined within six months and remained with the team for approximately one year.

== Podcast ==
By 2010, podcast downloads had exceeded 1 million. To date, 449 episodes have been produced, including interviews, dharma talks, and other topics of interest to people involved in modern Buddhist teaching and practice. These often include explorations of the interface between Buddhism and branches of modern science, such as neurology or game theory. Occasionally, interviewees have been invited from outside the Buddhist community, where their concerns might present matters of interest to Buddhist practitioners.

== Online magazine ==
The website or online magazine was updated in 2009 to support increasing interest from the Buddhist community. The Buddhist Geeks website is the online magazine, with pages for each podcast episode as the primary content, with additional video media and blog posts.

== Conference ==
In 2010, Buddhist Geeks left the purely digital world with its first in-person event, the Buddhist Geeks Conference. The first event, held in the summer of 2011 in Los Angeles, has been featured in many publications, including Tricycle, Fast Company, and the LA Times. Since then, the conference has become an annual event featuring talks, round table discussions, and meditation.

The Buddhist Geeks Conference 2012 took place August 9 through 11 in the University Memorial Center on the Colorado University campus; the 2013 Conference was in the same venue, August 16 through 18.
