= Buddhism and Judaism =

Since the 20th century, Buddhism and Judaism have become associated due to the common religious overlap in Jewish Buddhists. Somewhere between 16.5 to 30% of Buddhists in the US have a Jewish background or maintain a relationship to Judaism, in contrast to the 2 to 3% of the US population that is ethnically or religiously Jewish.

Some Jews find that Buddhist practices like tantra, mindfulness, and meditation have inspired them to be a better Jew, encouraging them to pray more often, read scripture more frequently, and to keep shomer Shabbat as a form of weekly retreat for meditation and study. Others find that their dual identity is a mosaic, or a tangled set of vines, and that it may be "unfair" to each religion, or that it makes them deficient in some way to both, but that they are at peace with it and don't care much. Some who are (or were) JewBus come to the conclusion you can't be both, even as they admit one of the traditions still influences them. Others believe dual religious identity is possible, or even easy. Some American Buddhist centers specifically encourage people to reconcile with their birth religion, which helps some Jews feel strongly about their Jewish identity while continuing Buddhist practice.

Dually religious Jewish Buddhists tend to be lay people in Buddhist terms, but a large number of them are rabbis or cantors. They tend to attend synagogue or a minyan regularly, and have limited affiliation with Buddhism. They tend to engage with Buddhism through books and private meditation or occasional retreats, but generally lack official ties to Buddhist organizations. They tend to view themselves as spiritual, be socially and politically liberal, and are slightly more likely to be women, though this is based on a small sample size. They also do not always identify as Buddhist, with many saying they are meditators. Sylvia Boorstein discusses a trepidation she felt on this front, having described herself as a "meditation teacher" for some time before admitting she was a Buddhist to herself. For Boorstein, part of her hesitation was a fear of judgement and rejection from other Jews. In order to navigate "acceptable" cultural blending and avoid the internal and external accusation of avodah zarah, many syncretic Jews will adopt Buddhist practices (primarily meditation), but avoid things they classify as belief (taking vows, celebrating holidays, self identification, and participating in or accepting mythological/cosmological ideas). However, they almost never take part in communal activities with Buddhists as practice, restricting these to once a year events. Some of them were, or almost were, ordained in Buddhism. These people do not necessarily disavow Buddhism, saying things such as "If it [spiritual truth] was here [Buddhism], it must be there [Judaism] as well, even if it’s a little more mucked up and harder to find, and that I would consciously make the move not away from Buddhism per se but back into Judaism".

Many Jewish Buddhists in the US feel little to no attachment to Buddhism as it is practiced in Asia and practice specifically Americanized forms of Buddhism. Most are not multigenerational Buddhists (though this may change as time passes) and came to engage with Buddhist traditions on their own as adults. While interactions between Jews and Buddhists have been marked by uneven power relations and white Jews remaking Buddhism to suit their purposes and to increase its compatibility with American society (often at the expense of Asian perspectives) the conflict in an American context lacks the violence from early Buddhist-Christian interactions (wherein white Christians victimized Buddhists via colonization and missionary efforts). Jewish Buddhists have also helped defend Asian Buddhists against discrimination, and collaorated with Asian teachers in the course of adapting Buddhism to America.

The theories for why Jews are attracted to Buddhism include:

- Buddhists have never historically persecuted Jews.
- Many Jews have faced a community wide, recent trauma that has forced them to contemplate suffering, and Buddhism has tools to comprehend this.
- Modern Jews are more secularized than Christians in the US, and are positioned as outsiders in a way that makes them more willing to embrace ideas seen as foreign.
- Both religions have well developed scholastic and scriptural traditions.
- The way Jews think about God may actually be uniquely suited, out of all the major monotheistic religions, to fit inside nontheist Buddhism.
- Buddhism limits its theological demands on followers and does not emphasize chosenness, a principle more and more Jews are frustrated by. Instead it is universalist.
- Buddhist and Jewish mystical traditions have noted similarities, but Buddhism makes its mysticism more accessible.
- Jews occupy a specific social strata that Buddhism often appeals to: the "highly educated upper middle class, intellectuals, artists, and bohemians."
- Buddhism has "pull factors" that appeal to Jews, such as: being a "body-based practice that lends itself to direct experience"; Buddhist practices have been consciously reworded and presented anew for Western audiences, increasing their appeal; an appreciation for mindfulness in an age of electronics; and the particulars of the Buddhist approach to ending war, poverty, discrimination, environmental destruction, and substance abuse.

== History ==
=== 17th and 18th century ===
Some scholars believe Buddhism and particularly Buddhist shamanism may have had a role in the early development of the Eastern European Hasidic tradition and its use of ritual techniques like trance and hypnosis. This is potentially possible due to the influence of Kalmyks in particular, a few of which converted to Judaism. Some Jews of Kalmyk ancestry claim they are descendants of Khazars, who after the destruction of the Khazarian kingdom were assimilated into Vajrayana Buddhism but retained a few Jewish customs. Their family lore indicates they likely first interacted with Jews in Poland after this while commissioned to protect civilians. Later, some of them settled in Belarus and married Jewish women after converting to Judaism. This community likely had a significant overlap with Cossack Subbotniks/Judaizers. Many of these Judaized Cossacks protected other Jews from violence during early 20th century conflicts, such as the Russian civil war. Very few of them exist in Russia today, as many were deported by Stalin and some left for Palestine before the founding of Israel as a modern state. Supposedly, a village exists in eastern Siberia of people descended from Judaized Cossacks who were celebrating Passover as recently as 1986, though they hide their religion from outsiders. It is worth noting this family history is oral lore which is difficult to verify, and discussions of the Khazars are often fraught with conspiracy and antisemitic rhetoric.

=== 19th century ===
The first American Jew known to have converted to Buddhism in the US was Charles T. Strauss, who converted to Theravada Buddhism in 1893 after the World’s Parliament of Religions in Chicago. Prior to this he had studied western texts on Buddhism for several years and attended the conference specifically to learn more about Buddhism. Strauss was born in Switzerland and had immigrated to the US at age 18 in 1870. While this event is the most notable 19th century interaction between Jews and Buddhists, it is not the only interaction. Newspaper articles from the time show many Americans, including many Jews, were interested in Judaism during this time. Strauss attested that he never identified as religiously Jewish and had only occasionally been to synagogue before his conversion to Buddhism. He was brought up in a milieu of liberal (probably Reform) Judaism, which emphasized social justice, rationalism, and universality.

Strauss studied Pali, contributed to efforts to revive Buddhist institutions in Asia after the damage done by colonialism, and helped establish the first Buddhist community in Western Europe in Leipzig. As a wealthy man he was able to travel between Germany and Sri Lanka, aiding his efforts. During the beginning of World War 1, he fled to Switzerland and lived there until he died. During this time he wrote The Buddha and His Doctrine, a book about his Buddhist practice and his belief in its compatibility with rationalism, social justice, individualism and religious liberalism. He mainly focused on his Theravada tradition, portraying it as "original genuine Buddhism" (a biased and Orientalist view common among westerners at the time). Part of his motive in writing was to defend Buddhism against the allegations that it was nihilistic and atheistic.

Strauss was staunchly opposed to esoteric Buddhism (Vajrayana) due to his view of Buddhism as a rationalist religion. He also emphasized an individualist view of Buddhism and downplayed the importance of prayer, sacrifice, intermediaries (saints and similar figures), ceremonies, ordained clergy, and saviour figures as unnecessary. He was extremely skeptical of revelatory theology. His rationalism also lead him to struggle with belief in reincarnation and multiple deities. This led him to conclude it wasn't necessary to believe in reincarnation to be a Buddhist in an ethical sense, and that Buddhist devas were only figureheads that distracted from the core of the tradition and were a feature of later Asian additions. This means Strauss was one of the first Buddhist modernists. Buddhist modernism is a reformatory movement that seeks to demythologize, detraditionalize, and psychologize Buddhism, and bring it in line with modern Western values. This effort was also carried by Strauss' Sri Lankan teacher, Dharmapala. Sri Lankan Buddhism faced a violent suppression by Protestant colonizers and missionaries. The modernist reform of Buddhism sought to legitimize it in the eyes of these colonizers. While it sought to gain autonomy for Asian Buddhists, it also capitulated to colonial logic, "whitening" the tradition. Interestingly, while most contemporary Jewish Americans disliked esoteric Buddhism, many gentile Americans (especially from rural areas and less affluent backgrounds) gave it equal fascination.

The majority of Strauss' contemporary Jews that were interested in Buddhism likely occupied a position as sympathetic parties. No others publicly converted. Some of these were very prominent people, such as Rabbi Samuel Adler's son, Felix. Felix was a highly educated person who almost became a rabbi, but whose radical liberal beliefs lead him to become a professor of Hebrew and Oriental literature instead. He also delivered multiple lectures on Buddhism. Felix, however, was never able to accept Buddhist doctrines on suffering, rebirth, and nirvana. He criticized the religion as overly passive and unconcerned with the present.

Several other American Jews of the late 19th century published newspaper articles praising Buddhism and explaining it to a western audience. It was portrayed as beautiful, sophisticated, and intelligent. Many lectures and books, often geared at Jewish audiences, were advertised, sometimes taking place in synagogues and at Jewish clubs. However, Jewish papers also published critical articles regarding Buddhism, particularly criticizing Strauss and accusing him of being attention seeking. These criticisms also attacked Buddhism as atheist, pessimist, idolatrous, and effeminate (in the sense of psychological emasculation). Many of these criticisms came alongside racist rhetoric attacking Chinese and Japanese immigrants.

Some of this popularity came from novelty. Asian Buddhists began delivering lectures in America for the first time during the late 19th century. Strauss also sparked a lot of public discussion by publicly converting. A second factor was that the 19th century saw a large influx of Western and Central European Jewish immigrants, who gained economic success and sought to assimilate. Highbrow Protestant American culture of the time was fascinated by Asia, leading Jews to study Asian culture and gain an appreciation for it. Third, Reform Judaism and Modernist Buddhism had similar ethical concerns and both sought to reform their traditions, giving them common ground. Liberal new religions also sprang up around this time, influencing the zeitgeist.

=== 20th century ===
Anti-Asian racism caused a decrease in Jewish interest in Buddhism during the early 20th century, especially due to the perception of Japan in America after Pearl Harbor. While general interest waned, more individual Jews of wealthy backgrounds began pursuing Buddhist training from Asian teachers, sometimes traveling abroad to learn from them directly. These Jews had little to no education on Jewish religion and did not interpret Buddhism through a Jewish religious lens. They also maintained the tendency for Jewish Americans interested in Buddhism to stick to Buddhist modernism. However, rather than being attracted to Theravada, many were interested in Japanese Buddhism, especially Zen Buddhism. Some Jews of this era, such as Samuel Lewis (who would later become a Zen Buddhist), were also interested in Sufism, particularly the Universal Sufism spread by Inayat Khan. Lewis facilitated a meeting between one of his Sufi teachers and one of his Zen teachers, and began cultural exchange between the traditions.

The second round of Jewish conversion to Buddhism consisted of a very small group of people who converted in the 1920s to 1950s. One of these people, Julius Goldwater (relative of the senator Barry Goldwater), became a teacher who helped second generation Asian immigrants maintain their traditions in America, and fought on their behalf when President Roosevelt ordered Japanese Americans to be imprisoned in internment camps. This included watching over belongings and homes to prevent their sale and seizure, conflict with the police and federal authorities, and traveling to camps to distribute coffee, candy, and Buddhist literature.

Nonsectarianism was promoted in this era by Goldwater, as was the Protestantization of Buddhism in hopes that it would become more acceptable. This led to conflict with Japanese born Buddhists after the war.

In the 1950s, the US experienced a "Zen boom" due to an increased availability of Zen teachers and literature. Zen teachers moved to the US from Japan to take advantage of the limited presence of Buddhist institutions there, allowing them to break with rigid organizational norms found in Japan. The poetic Beat movement also took an interest in Zen Buddhism, drawing it into popular counterculture. Buddhist teachers also reformulated the English presentation of Buddhism into increasingly humanistic terms, decoupling it from temple practices and monasticism. Jewish Buddhists also furthered this by continuing to Protestantize Buddhism. Finally, the changed immigration laws of 1965 allowed Buddhists from different countries to enter the US for the first time, introducing new traditions and increasing the number of born Buddhists. By the late 60s and 70s, Buddhism became a fashionable religion associated with liberals and left leaning politics.

The 1960s marked a shift from an interest in literary Buddhism to an interest in meditation. Ethnically Jewish Buddhists also became teachers of Buddhism during this era in larger numbers. The association with Jews and Buddhism broadened from Zen to include Tibetan Buddhism as well, and Theravada forms of meditation. Jews were particularly influential in the establishment of Theravada meditation in the US. Some Jews also branched out from Japanese Zen into other regional Zen traditions, but not in the same numbers. This era of Jewish Buddhists (who included people with more education in Judaism) also brought in Jewish religious ideas to Buddhist spaces, beginning Jewish-Buddhist syncretism. The first term for Jewish Buddhists was passed around by people on the Hippie trail around this time ("Bewish").

During this time, Blanche Hartman became a prominent figure in elevating the status of women in Zen. Hartman was the first mother to be ordained as an Abbess in Zen, and sought to create practices tailored to Buddhist women, such as rituals for dealing with miscarriage and abortion. She used her power to help break gender segregations imposed in Japanese Buddhist traditions.

Tibetan Buddhism as introduced to the US in 60s and 70s was relatively untouched by modernization and Protestantization efforts. It had, by comparison, more cosmology, devotional ritual, and religiosity. Many American Jews studied Tibetan Buddhism either abroad or under Chogyam Trungpa.

While ethnic Jews fully took on Zen and Tibetan Buddhism, with leaders often being fully ordained, most did not fully take on Theravada. Meditation was taken on, but chants, temple ritual, ceremony, monasticism, traditional leadership roles (even ones thst fpuld be reinterprted), and material culture were purposely left behind. Meditation was cast as "universal and nonsectarian", despite the practice not being generic meditation and despite meditation traditionally being done by monks and nuns and not by laypeople. This was, admittedly, a continuation of the Buddhist modernism begun by Asian Theravada teachers, who presented meditation as scientific and deliberately did not teach their students about the broader Theravada tradition. They and their ethnically Jewish students both saw broadening the accessibility of meditation as beneficial. Even so, ethnically Jewish teachers went further, cutting out teachings on rebirth, the realms of existence, merit making, and the four stages of enlightenment. These were essential aspects of Theravada that were left behind to ensure popular appeal. Instead, the Theravada teachings of mindfulness, loving-kindness (metta), ethics, and generosity were emphasized. Loving-kindness is not traditionally emphasized in Theravada meditation; however, Judaism emphasizes the same principle (chesed, in Hebrew). The way loving-kindness is used in this new context also has aspects of forgiveness ritual that are more similar to selichot (Jewish penitential prayers) than Theravada custom.

To a lesser extent, Zen meditation has also been secularized by ethnically Jewish Buddhists who view the lineage and traditions of Asian Buddhism distract from meditation. Tibetan traditions have not yet had a discernible impact from Jews, as it has taken longer for Jews to occupy leadership positions.

Some of the downplaying of monasticism and mythology may be owed to their Jewish background. Rabbinic Judaism has no common monastic or renunciant religious roles (nazirites are similar, but rare in a post Jerusalem Temple religious context, and Ethiopian Judaism, which is non-rabbinic, has some monastic elements). Rabbinic Judaism, which most Jews today belong to, strongly emphasizes family life. Furthermore, Rabbinic Judaism has less emphasis on cosmology and mythology (though Jewish mythology and extensive cosmology does exist, such as in Hekhalot literature).

Ethnically Jewish Buddhists have also contributed to Western Buddhists associating Buddhism strongly with social and political activism, creating engaged Buddhism. This reflects the fact that Jews in the US are more likely to be involved in social activism compared to other ethnic and religious groups, something that is acknowledged by Jewish Buddhists.

Ethnically Jewish Buddhists have also contributed greatly to Buddhism being perceived and engaged with as a very psychological tradition. For American Buddhists, meditation is often used to treat issues with anger, anxiety, and depression, which is not how meditation is viewed in an Asian context. This is also something connected to heavy Jewish involvement in psychology in the US. Some Jews, who were not involved in Buddhism, also participated in this while trying to completely divorce meditation from its Buddhist origins.

The attraction of Jews to meditation and contemplation lead to rebukes from some community leaders in the 1970s and 80s, as well as research into meditation and contemplation practices from the Jewish tradition that could augment or compete with Buddhist meditation. Around this same time was the birth of Renewal Judaism, which uses ideas from Kabbalah and Hasidic Judaism in a more left-liberal context. Renewal Jews felt that Judaism had grown to lack authentic religious experiences. Renewal Judaism practices Deep Ecumenism, and explicitly explores techniques and traditions from other religions (such as Buddhism and Sufism) to enhance Judaism and promote cross religious dialogue. The founder of the movement, Reb Zalman, was a friend towards Jews who were exploring and had explored Judaism. He famously took part in the conference with the Dalai Lama at Dharamsala. He provided a space and a permission for Jews to begin exploring the idea of being syncretic or dual faith- practicing both Buddhism and Judaism, simultaneously. This also changed the relationship between the two religions. Rather than Jews changing the way Buddhism is practiced and Buddhism having little impact on Judaism, Buddhists began changing the way Judaism is practiced.

in 1990, the Dharamsala Jewish-Tibetan conference took place. This conference was attended by the Dalai Lama, 8 Jewish scholars and rabbis, and the Jewish American writer Rodger Kamenetz, who wrote a book on the subject. This conference was fubded by the Nathan Cummings Foundation, which also funded various efforts in the 1990s to bring Buddhist techniques into Judaism to spiritually rejuvenate the tradition.

=== 21st century ===
In the 21st century, focus switched from the interreligious dialogue of the 1990s to a movement that drew on Buddhist traditions and ideas to create new forms of Jewish prayer, community organization, and other practices. Alan Lew and Norman Fischer (a rabbi and a Zen teacher, respectively, both of a Jewish background) invented a uniquely Jewish meditation practice that drew on Zen teachings. It was designed as a preparation ritual for normal Jewish prayer services. Around this time, Sylvia Boorstein began also teaching Buddhist meditation (derived from Theravada) to Jewish students.

In the past two decades, multiple similar programs and organizations dedicated to Jewish meditation have been founded, such as the Awakened Heart Project for Contemplative Judaism, an online resource dedicated to Jewish meditation and contemplative prayer. Other contemplative organizations have also been founded, such as the Elat Chayyim Center for Jewish Spirituality, which uses the model of a Buddhist retreat. Elat Chayyim intentionally synthesizes Judaism and Buddhism.

Simultaneously, contemplative programs such as Metivta and Chochmat HaLev have been founded, which explicitly avoid Buddhist influences and focus on "pure" Jewish practice and tradition in an attempt to dissuade Jews from turning to Eastern religions and to prevent the influence of foreign traditions.

== Similar beliefs ==
Historically, Judaism has incorporated the wisdom of alien religions that do not contradict the Torah while rejecting polytheism and the worship of graven images.

=== Rejection of gods ===
While Buddhism is sometimes described as atheist, the truth is more complex than this, with some Buddhists having either nontheist, atheist, polytheist, or occasionally monotheist views. Within the Pali canon, devas are seen as powerless. They, like humans, are trapped in samsara, and do not have the power to liberate others from it. This is similar to Islamic and Jewish views of gods other than their Creator deity, which are generally seen as impotent. Muslims from esoteric schools of thought have also noticed similarities between Islamic conceptions of God and Buddhist ideas regarding Ultimate Reality/Adi-Buddha/Dharmakaya, particularly in regards to nondualism and a goal in mystic circles to become "extinguished" (fana in Islam, nirvana in Buddhism) within God/Ultimate Reality. Similar nondualist ideas and desires for unity with God exist in Judaism, partially due to mutual Jewish-Muslim influence. Jewish poets adopted several turns of phrase discussing the ever-presence of God from Muslims.

=== Monotheism ===
Buddhist Views

While monotheism is not the standard view for most Buddhists, some Buddhists have expressed views similar to monotheism. Historically, these have been similar enough that some Muslim rulers have accepted Buddhists as "people of the book". Some Buddhists, particularly in places with social/legal pressures, have explicitly articulated themselves as monotheists. In the 1960s, Indonesian Buddhists defended their right to legal recognition by saying their one God was Adi-Buddha, the Buddhas and bodhisattvas are prophets, and defining their scripture. This first point was particularly defined based on Sang Hyang Kamayanikan, and the extant practice in Nepal of venerating Adi-Buddha (lit. "Primidorial Buddha", the source of all Buddhas and Buddhahood). While initially accepted by all Indonesian Buddhists, Indonesian Theravada Buddhists came to reject this concept. Instead they think God is represented in the Pali canon as described, but nameless. Some Theravada Buddhists outside Indonesia also thoroughly rejected this concept, denying there was a God in Buddhism at all. Another concept identified with the godhead in Buddhism is the three body (trikaya) doctrine: that Buddha had a material body (nirmanakaya, the physical form), a light body (sambhogakaya, a heavenly manifestation), and an essential body (dharmakaya, the transcendent form). Some derivations of this thought thereby see Buddha as an ultimate reality that has manifested many times, including through Siddhartha, whose material body died, but whose essential body (dharmakaya) was neither born nor dead. Nichiren Buddhists in Indonesia, on the other hand, articulate God as being Natural Law (cause and effect). These stances are still held by Indonesian Buddhists to this day.

Analyses of other Mahayana texts also indicate substantial evidence for a belief in God or a godhead, such as The Awakening of Faith in Mahayana. Part of the issue in analyzing these texts (and comparing Buddhism to Judaism) are assumptions about what God is; most who make the claim that Buddhism denies the existence of God do so from an explicitly Christian framework where God is "omnipotent, omniscient, all-good, and primordially existent creator" or "a Supreme Being who created the world and the creatures in it". These statements both do not analyze all Buddhist texts closely, and (especially in the case of the former type of statement) rely upon exactly one monotheistic religion's definition of God to try and define what all monotheistic religions believe.

Buddhist beliefs that are similar to monotheism tend to be nondualist/pantheistic/panentheistic, and sometimes have close parallels to process theology. Process theology has become a significant touchstone for Buddhist-Christian relations in particular. Process theology, while not explicitly invoked by many Jewish Buddhists, has parallels to traditional Jewish theology, where God is seen as a partner to the Jewish people who responds to them (this is sometimes particularly represented as a bridal metaphor). Process theology has also been incorporated into Judaism alongside these older views. Some of Mahayana writings even indicate a belief in a source of all things, or may express a belief in localized creations of specific worlds. Tibetan Buddhism's shentong, which has roots in Indian Buddhist ideas, also has some common ground with forms of Judaism that see God as Ultimate Reality or similar concepts. In Shentong thought, all relative phenomena are empty of inherent existence (meaning they are impermanent and change over time) except for ultimate reality, which is empty of relative phenomena but is not empty of itself. Ultimate reality is usually identified as Buddha-nature or its source. The tension that defines whether or not a school of Buddhist thought has a similarity to Judaism could be summarized in whether or not that school thinks there is an ultimate or not (or tries to mediate between the two). This is a legitimate and significant point of disagreement that mainly takes place within the different schools of the Mahayana branch.

People who have analyzed Buddhist texts to determine if Buddhism truly denies any idea of God have used a few analytical techniques, including Perfect Being Theology (PBT). Perfect Being Theology has a basis in the works of Anselm of Canterbury and Plato, and defines God as having:

- Maximal greatness: "something than which no greater can be thought" or "the greatest metaphysically possible being"
- Great making properties, which include at least some of the following but do not need to include all of the following: omniscience, omnipotence, and omnibenevolence, simplicity, aseity, eternity, personhood, omnipresence, and others.

The exact interpretations of these two elements vary between theologians, with some placing emphasis on one or the other. A theologian emphasizing maximal greatness over great making qualities may, for example, conclude God is both maximally good and maximally evil. This idea has resonances with certain quotes from the Jewish scriptures, which can be translated as God saying "I am (or make) good and I am (or make) evil." Using PBT, a theologian can determine if a text has a concept of God by determining if the text 1) describes a maximally great being and 2) further explains maximal greatness through a set of great making properties, it has a concept of a God.

The Awakening of Faith in Mahayana uses the term "Mahayana" in the sense of "the Mind of sentient being, which is identical with the One Mind/Ultimate Reality/Suchness", rather than the broader school of Buddhism also referred to by the same term. Phenomenal reality is seen as the activity and attributes of "the absolute/suchness" or "essence" (the One Mind), though this activity includes "essence" itself too, due to the nondualist perspective of the work. The relationship between the two can be explained in a Buddhist context as the "absolute" or "essence" being the ocean, and phenomenal activity (such as sentient beings) being waves. This metaphor is also used in Sufism to explain the relationship between God and reality. Ultimate reality (a concept found in a few other schools of Buddhist thought) here meets the first part of PBT: something which is maximally great.

As for the great making properties, Awakening also explains the "great" (maha) in Mahayana refers to 1) the greatness of essence, as all phenomena are identical with Suchness, 2) the greatness of attributes, as Buddha-nature has numberless qualities, and 3) the greatness of activity, because the activity of Suchness gives rise to good causes and effects. These traits have been compared to Ultimism, which argues three qualities for something to be theologically ultimate: 1) it is the ontological source of all there is (metaphysically ultimate), 2) it is unsurpassably excellent (axiologically ultimate), 3) the ultimate good is to be obtained through it (soteriologically ultimate). This is used as a complementary analysis. The text of Awakening further states that Suchness has no increase or decrease and is eternal, never having been created and never having an end. It is not an entity, but the ontological ground that makes it possible for entities to exist (greatness of essence and metaphysical ultimacy). It has the light of great wisdom that illuminates the universe, it has true cognition and mind pure in self-nature, bliss, Self, purity, refreshing coolness, immutablility, and freedom. These qualities are real and applicable to Suchness, in spite of other qualities which are provisional (i.e. not real) because they are not differentiating qualities and are beyond all entities (greatness of attributes and axiological ultimacy). The Buddhas possess Suchness, which pervades everything, and they are the Dharmakaya itself. They lead beings to enlightenment (greatness of activity and soteriological ultimacy).

The Śūraṅgama Sutra contains similar contemplations of an everlasting true mind, which is identical to Buddha-nature and is the fundamental nature of the universe. The world of life and death emanates out of the original primidorial Buddha-nature due to delusion caused by subject-object separation. Much like in other emanationist schools of thought, the individual can turn themselves back to the source and realize where they originally came from.

The Saṃdhinirmocana sūtra argues that the idea of total emptiness is the second wheel out of three wheels of doctrine, meaning it is not a complete teaching. The third wheel (the complete teaching) is the excellent differentiation of the ultimate. This is the immanent pure mind. This third wheel is also associated with the idea of Buddha-nature. Multiple other sutras further identify Buddha-nature and the third wheel with the idea of basic consciousness or universal ground, also called ontological ground. These teachings are associated with Yogacara thought.

The Madhyamaka has a different approach to these teachings. Buddha-nature is identified with emptiness (shunyata), the intrinsic nature of everything. It has a positive dimension here, as emptiness manifests as both being empty of the extrinsic as well as the intrinsic. Something can be (extrinsically) empty of something else without being (intrinsically) empty of itself, as is the case with water, which is empty of chlorine but not of itself. This is other-emptiness and self-emptiness (shentong and rangtong). Buddha-nature is identified with both (sometimes simultaneously and sometimes with one but not the other), but it is especially so with other-emptiness. Sometimes Buddha-nature is seen as what remains in emptiness when defilements are removed.

The idea of Buddha-nature as the pure nature of mind and reality is the center of significant Buddhist debate today. It has been contested as a reified absolute that extrapolates too far from the teaching. It has been associated by its critics with intellectual stagnation and moral decline. However, the texts which have put forth the idea of Buddha-nature as an ultimate explicitly framed it as an ethical stance to prevent "discouragement [thinking one could never become a Buddha and not trying], disparagement of inferior beings, not apprehending the authentic [by holding to an extreme view of emptiness], denigration of the authentic truth [by holding to an extreme of either eternalism or annihilationism], considering ourselves superior [when everyone is equal and this upholds a false self-other distinction]." The teaching also is intended to help people develop an enlightened mind by nurturing compassion and insight. The implication of Buddha-nature is that all beings (some say just sentient beings, but others include non-sentient beings, such as dogs) have a seed of Buddha-nature in them, and therefore have the capacity to become Buddhas. Tantric practices, with a nondual focus, frame this slightly differently: everyone already is a buddha, but they need to realize this. This also philosophically apprehends the idea that the body and world should be fully denigrated as an inferior state, an opinion which quickly becomes life-denying and can over-emphasize suffering.

Some tantric texts, such as the Dzogchen Kunjed Gyalpo contain very monotheistic ideas: the title of the text is "All Creating King", which is considered to be the ultimate. His entourage includes all elements of the trikaya, the three realms of formlessness, forms, and desires, the four Yogas, and all Buddhas past, present, and future. This means his entourage is the entire universe, which he absorbs into himself and which reflects the King's nature; i.e. there is no real distinction between the two. The All Creating King is the ontological ground of all phenomena, which emanate out of him. In one version this starts with the five "wisdoms" of hatred, passion, ignorance, jealousy, and arrogance. From these wisdoms emanate the five great visible causes (earth, water, wind, fire, and space), which make up the three realms of impermanent existence. Another emanation series later in the text states the three realms, five greatnesses, and six characters are the five aspects of bodhicitta ("mind of pure perfection"), which emanates from the nature of the King and is the identity of the King. The King is reflected (immanent) in the phenomenal world, yet transcends it. In their particular arguments for this, the author discards the idea of causality, which is a cornerstone in most Buddhist thought. This thwarts the argument that a pure and good primary principle cannot be the origin of the world's misery and evil. The King proclaims that no one was beside him as he created reality, crowned the Buddhas, made his entourages, or established the nature of reality. These concepts are very clearly related to Cittamatra/Yogacara and Tantric thought. While the text does not have a craftsman God, it does have an other that predates and precedes all else, which is a "mind" as found in other Buddhist schools influenced by Yogacara. It is unusual in the language and metaphor it uses of a creator and ultimate King.

Jewish Views

Within the disagreement over Judaism and Buddhism's theologies is the existence of a "creator God", especially one who created literally everything and did so consciously. Creation ex materia and ex nihilo are both accepted beliefs (or at least possible) in Judaism, though the latter is more common. In the former instance, matter already existed as a dark formless mass, but God in the Hebrew Scriptures assigned it roles and organized it to create the earth, sea, wind, and so on. This thinking of God as an organizer of reality is adopted by some process theologians. This would complicate denials from a Buddhist perspective. Another potential complication is the fact that some Jewish accounts of creation ex nihilo frame it as a series of emanations. This frames creation not as the universe to being created by a sentient God who is separate from its creation, but as all things deriving from a transcendent principle which can be identified as God. This has parallels to the analysis of The Awakening of Faith in Mahayana, and other Buddhist texts discussed above.

While some Jews hold beliefs similar to Christianity, with an all powerful, all loving, all knowing, all present, transcendent yet immanent God that has a personal affect. However, denials from a Jewish perspective exist for God's omnipotence and omniscience especially in regard to human action, the fact that the Torah, prophets, and Talmud have no word for "omnipotent" and present God as powerful, but not totally powerful, and there is some expressed doubt over God's omnibenevolence. Some Jews have looked at misfortunes that have impacted groups of Jews and found themselves wondering if God is an antisemite. Others maintain that God is good, but not absolutely good, and that humans help remind God to be good, just as God reminds humans to be good.

Further, many Jews do not view God as a personal deity, instead seeing God as an impersonal force (similar to how karma is seen). This view is twice as common among Jewish Americans at 50% of respondents saying the viewed God this way, compared to 25% who viewed God as a person with whom people could have a relationship. Buddhists had a similar breakdown- 20% believed in a personal God, and 45% viewed God as an impersonal force. Additionally, 10% of Jews identified as explicitly atheist compared to 19% of Buddhists. This view is explicitly endorsed by thinkers as influential as Mordecai Kaplan (founder of Reconstructionist Judaism). Traditional and modern conceptions of God may say God can be experienced but not understood.

Relating back to process theology again, the founder of Renewal Judaism, Reb Zalman (who also did a lot of ecumenical work for Jews and Buddhism) viewed God as a verb or process. In Zalman's view, God evolves alongside the rest of creation. This was expressed once by him interpreting a passage to mean "in God's youth" God had erred. Other ideas in the realm of process theology from a Jewish perspective is that omnipotence is incoherent because power is relational, and absolute power is self erasing; and God cannot be all-knowing because this erases the freedom of all beings, including God, and denies free-will. God's eternity, in the sense of unchanging-ness, is also questioned, because portraying God as always perfect is not consistent with Jewish scripture, where God is shown as grieving and repentant on some occasions. God is also depicted as a being that becomes angry, loves, and otherwise engages with the world. Jews from this perspective point out that reality itself is relational and always changing, and that Judaism acknowledges this by using the language of a covenant (brit) to refer to the relationship between people and God. The world is constantly changing, and thereby is partially self creating and self created, making the cosmos itself a partner of God. God dwells in the world, and therefore cannot be separate from it, either. This relational aspect makes God vulnerable, and God suffers and rejoices alongside the rest of creation, and is saved when people are saved. The dipolarity of God may be emphasized- that God can be both finite and infinite, near to a person and far, separate from creation yet filling it, eternal yet dynamic. This nondualism is based partially on Kabbalaistic writings that proclaim divine essence exists in all things (including rocks), and that one should not assign dualism to God.

Some Jews, from the perspective of process theology, argue that a God who would create this world, with its suffering, would be evil. This idea reflects a Buddhist criticism of certain ideas of God, where a God who makes it possible for injustice to exist when God could have made it impossible must be evil. Even Jews that do not necessarily identify as process theologians (like Rabbi Harold Kushner) have stated that a God who is all powerful and therefore allows evil to occur cannot be compassionate, and can inspire fear and obedience, but does not deserve love. They may adopt the idea of persuasive vs coercive power, arguing that God invites and convinces people to make certain choices while abiding by natural law, and does not force things to happen. A bit provocatively, they cite certain texts to suggest that when people act according to God's will, God's power increases; and when they disobey or act against it, God's power decreases.

Some Jewish Buddhists view God as formless, beyond name and description, but not beyond love or respect. This loving attitude can be used as part of metta (loving kindness) practice. They also may synthesize Buddhist and Jewish perspectives by viewing God in a nondual way.

=== Reincarnation ===
Many modern schools of Judaism have had a longstanding acknowledgement of a concept similar to reincarnation known as gilgul. This belief is referred to in Jewish post-biblical literature and many folk and traditional stories. Hasidic Jews and many others who follow Kabbalah believe that a Jew's soul can be reborn on earth if, in its previous lives, it failed to fulfil all of the mitzvot required to enter paradise.

Conversion to Judaism is sometimes understood within Orthodox Judaism in terms of reincarnation. According to this school of thought in Judaism, when non-Jews are drawn to Judaism, it is because they had been Jews in their former life. Such souls may "wander among nations" through multiple lives until they find their way back to Judaism, including through finding themselves born in a gentile family with a "lost" Jewish ancestor.

In addition to this, some Jewish scriptures emphasize the cyclical nature of the world, such Ecclesiastes.

A very early version of Jewish afterlife beliefs in Daniel 12 recounts that the righteous dead "will be like stars", implying a rebirth or resurrection into the astral realm. The stars in Hebrew cosmology are often equated both to angels and to the lesser divinities worshiped by other nations who are subordinate to God. This could be seen as similar to the way devas are presented in Buddhism (heavenly beings which humans can be reborn as, as a result of good karma), and angels have been compared to devas on some occasions.

=== Meditation ===
Many young Israelis are drawn to the appeal of Buddhist meditation as a means to alleviate the violence and conflict witnessed in their everyday lives and explain the Jews' longstanding history of persecution. Some strains of Orthodox Judaism (e.g., Breslovers) have embraced meditation since the 18th century as a means to commune with God, but Reform Jews have historically opposed it in favor of a more rationalist, intellectual form of worship. Some children and grandchildren of Holocaust survivors have purportedly found comfort in Buddhist explanations of the nature of suffering and the path to end suffering. As Buddhism technically neither denies nor acknowledges the existence of God, observant Jews are able to embrace its wisdom while maintaining their normative Judaism. Meditation also provides an important parallel to Judaism; both convert Buddhism in the US and Judaism more generally emphasize practice as a central tenet of identity (compare to Christianity, which heavily emphasizes belief over practice). For Jews, this practice comes from prayer and observance of at least some religious laws. For convert Buddhists, this is usually filled by meditation. Jews who have dual faith or syncretic relationships to Buddhism also use this to article spiritual events: they are things one achieves rather than things one is gifted at random.

=== Prayer ===
While many Jewish prayers are different in their focus, Mourner's Kaddish and Mi Sheberiach (prayers on behalf of the dead and the sick) have a similar structure and intention to Dedication of Merit ceremonies done by some Buddhists. Both ask for names of particular people when said in group settings. Both are said on behalf of others on hopes that the actions of the speaker will help them. Some Jewish Buddhists view Jewish prayer as a practice that helps with mindfulness, discipline, and insight, alongside more traditional views like gratitude and love of God.

=== Ancestor Veneration ===
While Judaism has a slightly complicated relationship to the idea of ancestor veneration, prayers invoking and on behalf of ones ancestors make up a central part of Judaism. Scholars have noted significant parallels between Jewish ancestor veneration and Japanese Buddhist ancestor practices. Japanese ancestors veneration is deeply connected to Buddhism, as before the introduction and popularization of Buddhism Japanese culture did not attach special reverence to the dead at all. Instead the dead were avoided due to a deep fear of pollution. A similar fear of pollution from death also exists in Judaism (corpse uncleanness) and may be one of the reasons why the Torah mentions that things offered to the deceased cannot be offered as sacrifices to God afterwards, despite being written during a time when such sacrifices were still common (offerings to ancestors were possibly an uncontested practice until Josiah's religious reforms). This state of affairs changed in Japan mainly thanks to Pure Land Buddhism, though other Buddhists adopted their ideas quickly, and Buddhists from other schools had also already caused a gradual cultural shift. A common practice in Japanese Buddhism transforms potentially harmful spirits of the dead into ancestral divine spirits (sorei, lit. "Ancestor spirit", though they may also sometimes be called hotoke).

=== Karma and suffering ===
Some Jews believe in a concept similar to the Buddhist interpretation of the karmic balance known as middah k’neged middah (measure for measure). Evil deeds are believed to be repaid with misfortune, while good deeds bring rewards.

When adverse events occur to individuals regarded as good, some Jews and Buddhists may interpret these situations as tests of faith, indicators of suffering or imbalance within the larger community, or as consequences of the individual unintentionally causing harm through careless communication. Buddhists hold the perspective that certain events are part of the natural order, while traditionally, Jews have viewed God as the creator and sustainer of the universe, responsible for initiating these events. However, Maimonides took a view that certain things are simply aspects of natural order. Some Jews (influenced by Maimonides) also find that in order to live in a word with ephemerality and dynamism (i.e. impermanence), one must accept the existence of suffering, as evil is partially due to the natural order and partially due to the consequences of free will. In order to have free will, this unfortunately includes the will to do evil. People also cause harm to themselves be behaving immorally (a thought which Maimonides also articulates in a karmic fashion). Those who take the standpoint of process theology believe God neither causes these sufferings nor has the power to intervene in them (as God can only persuade, not coerce, and these actions come from the decisions made by creation).

Ecclesiastes, a book attributed to King Solomon, discusses how wealth and opulence are unsatisfactory, as is the pursuit of wisdom and choosing to live in ignorance. It laments at length the unfairness and vanity of life and many of its pursuits, in a manner similar to the Four Noble Truths. The book concludes the best thing one can do is enjoy life as it comes, not loosing oneself in vanities of life or allowing oneself to wallow, and that one should turn to God as that is all there is. Some parts of it also are similar to the advocation of the Middle Way: "Don’t overdo goodness and don’t act the wise man to excess….Don’t overdo wickedness and don’t be a fool or you may die before your time." However, it does not advocate for liberation from suffering, but to face it head on.

Judaism also has many varied, complicated conceptions regarding evil. Some point out that what humans perceive as evil is often simply what disrupts us, while for other creatures these disruptions are beneficial. Evil, in this sense, is simply a consequential part of creation.

=== Sin ===
Jews and Buddhists do not believe in original sin. Due to the popularity of doctrines related to Buddha-nature and original enlightenment, some Mahayana Buddhists say that "We all have Buddha Nature … we are born with Original Blessing, not Original Sin” (Parkum & Stultz 2003: 282). Buddhists often define evil as "[an] unskillful action that leads to suffering, for oneself, for others, or for both."

Most Jews believe a person is born innocent and pure, and sin (or more accurately, wrongdoing) is caused by the imperfections of humanity. One of these imperfections is the yezter hara (harmful inclination) which all humans have, alongside a yetzer hatov (good inclination). However, the yetzer hara is not fully "evil", as it encourages people to marry, have children, conduct business, and other activities that benefit others but which are partially motivated by lust or greed. For Jews, the idea of original sin is also incompatible with the concept of free will, which most Jews believe in and is emphasized in the Torah. Wrongdoing committed out of ignorance is also less severe than one done purposely. The word for "sin" in Hebrew (chet) means "to miss the mark" and is often compared to an archer who fails to hit a target.

=== Five precepts ===
Both Judaism and Buddhism forbid murder, adultery, theft, and bearing false witness. In Buddhism, these comprise four of the five precepts. In Judaism, they comprise the sixth, seventh, eighth, and ninth of the Ten Commandments, as well as components of the Noahide laws.

The fifth Buddhist precept discourages intoxication, which shares elements of disapproval with the Tanakh. The drunkenness of Noah is perhaps the most famous example, but the Book of Proverbs also warns that alcohol abuse leads to misfortune, poverty, and general sinfulness due to the removal of all inhibitions. Alcohol still plays a critical role in Jewish community and religious life, such as in Kiddush and Brit milah, and some communities encourage drinking (and even drunkenness) on the holiday of Purim.

=== Ethics ===
Anger in Judaism and Buddhism is viewed negatively. Judaism views it as something to be controlled, and slowness to anger is a virtuous trait. Similarly, both Buddhism and Judaism have a concept that is often translated as "loving kindness" (chesed/metta).

=== Bodhisattvas ===
In Buddhism, a bodhisattva is an enlightened person who has put off entry into paradise to help others gain enlightenment. Jews and Buddhists frequently regard the prophets of the Tanakh as similar beings to the bodhisattvas because they too delay entry to the afterlife until they have completed their mission of saving the children of Israel during times of persecution.

The similarities between bodhisattvas and prophets are particularly appealing for Messianic Jews—who are considered Christians by mainstream Judaism—who respect Jesus as a prophet and teacher but reject the Christian doctrine of his divinity. Inspired by the widespread belief that John the Baptist was the reincarnation of Elijah, some scholars of the Christian Bible have speculated that Jesus of Nazareth lived through several past lives, including as the pre-Israelite king Melchizedek.

=== Weekly intensification of practice and Lunar observance ===
Both Judaism and Buddhism have observances that occur roughly once a week where certain behaviors are prohibited and one is meant to spend the day studying or involved in religious pursuits: for Jews this is Shabbat, and for Buddhists this is an uposatha. There are also particular lunar observances.

The Uposatha is tied to the phases of the moon. In many Theravada countries the Uposatha days are the full, new, and cross quarter moons. The full moon is the most auspicious, and the highest level of observance among lay Buddhists occurs on the full moon. Lay people go to the temples on these days, take on the Eight precepts (which includes fasting after mid-day and abstaining from sex on observance days), wearing plain white clothes, and listening to sermons, watching ritual observances, meditation, and discussions regarding Dharma. For lay people unable to participate in monastic life, Uposathas are an opportunity to meditate, reading and chanting Buddhist texts, or giving in charity. Lay people stay in the monastery day and night. While associated with Southeast Asia, these vows are also taken for the Jukai Zen festival and at Chinese monasteries. In Chinese Buddhism, layity may also refrain from work, instead bringing food for the monks in exchange for teachings. Feasting is a more emphasized element in medieval Chinese texts as an Uposatha practice than fasting (the latter is associated with Brahmin practices in these texts). The feast usually still takes place before noon.

Some think that the Jewish tradition of Shabbat derives from an older Mesopotamian tradition that may have had something to do with the full moon, and that originally Shabbat was a specific full moon observance that only later became a weekly one. There is also some evidence in scripture indicating this. However, Rabbinic Judaism does not connect Shabbat to the lunar cycle. Shabbat is mentioned very early in the Torah in Genesis 2:1-3, and established during the creation of the world as a day of rest. Its continued observance commemorates the creation of this world. In Deuteronomy 5 it also mentioned as a commemoration of freedom from slavery in Egypt: some prayer books emphasize this more and add commentary about this idea during the Shabbat Amidah. It is also mentioned multiple times in Exodus 16, appears in the Ten Commandments, and is emphasized in many other texts.

Fasting on Shabbat is forbidden, as it is a joyous holiday, unless it is Yom Kippur. One is expected to show the day reverence by dressing nicely and ideally avoiding unpleasant conversations. People are prohibited from creative work (which consists of 39 categories). Jews are encouraged to spend the day at synagogue (this is the reason why Conservative Judaism permits driving on Shabbat, which otherwise would be forbidden as it involves starting a fire to start the engine, extinguishing the fire when the car is turned off, and transport outside a private home). They are encouraged to take part in festive meals, sing liturgical songs and hymns, study Torah and other texts, and spend time with other Jews.

While there are some significant differences, the two holidays (Uposathas and Shabbat) have enough in common that some people have called the former "the Buddhist Sabbath", or chosen to translate it as such.

Rosh Chodesh is the new moon, which starts the Hebrew months. While today not a great occasion, historically Rosh Chodesh was a very important holiday. People refrained from work, feasted, traveled to their home towns for the occasion, visited the shrines where prophets lived, and dedicated themselves to worship. Women have had a tradition of continuing the practice of not working, which is explained by a folktale in which they refused to willingly give their earrings to their husbands to melt them and make the Golden Calf. Rosh Chodesh is preceded by Yom Kippur Katan ("little Yom Kippur"), which is a day of fasting and prayer observed by mystics.

=== Cosmology ===
Buddhists often believe that there are a very large number of world systems existing concurrently. Similar approaches, arguing that there are many worlds, exist in Judaism. The Sefer Rabba di-Bereshit argues there are at least 18,000 other worlds, though how this is spatially laid out is a bit unclear.

Buddhist cosmology also depicts a world with many layers of realms (including heavens and hells) stacked on top of each other, often depicted as flat planes. This has a parallel in the Jewish idea that there are seven heavens and seven earths, similarly layered on top of each other. Technically speaking, Talmudic opinion is that one should not contemplate cosmology or the afterlife ("Anyone, who looks into [mistakkel be-] four things, it would be merciful for him if he had not come into the world: what is above, and what below, what is before, and what after."). However, in practice, the Genesis Rabbah is a mainstream work that discusses the creation of the world, and lesser known texts like the Sefer Yetzirah and Seder Rabba di-Bereshit discuss creation, what is above (the heavens) and what is below (hell/other earths). The Seder Rabbah di-Bereshit describes the world as a series of concentric spheres organized around a horizontal axis (which divides the heavens from the earths). However, other Jewish texts, including other Hekhalot literature, that focused on the heavens describe them as layered in flat planes. Hekhalot literature adds that the 7th heaven has 7 nested compartments, and that the aim of the journey was to reach the innermost one where God sits upon a throne. Traditionally, Jewish cosmology focused on the heavens and gave less attention to earths or netherworlds.

Other Jewish cosmologies also exist. 1 Enoch portrays the world as a flat plane with a hemisphere over it for the heavens; the realms of the dead are on this plane, though far away, and at each of the cardinal directions where the heaven and earth meet is a gate to permit entry and exit of stars (angels) and weather. Only the place of punishment for disobedient stars and angels sits outside this. On this plane are also mountains made of precious stone, one of which bearing a throne for God, perpetually burning fires at the ends of the earth that feed the stars, and the Garden of Eden.

== Blended practices ==
Generally speaking, many blended practices use Buddhism as a framework to recontextualize Judaism into a new format. However, the inverse also exists. Many Jews who have a syncretic or dual faith practice feel Buddhism is easily applicable to their daily life, not difficult to understand, and makes Judaism easier to understand and appreciate. This is partially because the Buddhism they practice is a very American form that does not heavily utilize sutras (which are written in different languages) or cosmological discourses, and which has slowly been translated and modified to be better understood by a Western audience for over 100 years, often while relying on psychological language. It has also been edited so that it is laid out clearly for a layperson to understand, with teachers doing most of the work to make Buddhism relevant and understandable. By contrast, Judaism, in the words of surveyed Jews, is mainly concerned with texts written in a language they do not know about topics relevant to people living in the Iron Age and Late Antiquity.

Many syncretic and dual faith Jews also use ideas about religion particular to America, such as emphasizing individualism and the idea of an underlying universality of all religions. Universality is also strongly associated with spirituality.

=== Altars ===
Some Jews have altars (such as ancestor altars) with both Jewish and Buddhist paraphernalia, including statues of Buddha. These Jews are more likely to identify as culturally Jewish rather than religiously and to not be involved in Jewish religious observances very much, but this is not always the case.

=== Meditation ===
Some Jewish day schools and synagogues have started offering Buddhist meditation programs that feature use of the Aleph (the first letter of the Hebrew alphabet/abjad, which is silent) as a focusing image. These may also include traditional meditation cushions patterned with Jewish symbols, Tibetan inspired prayer flags, which have hamsas printed on them and certain values (like justice, loving-kindness, honor, love, and healing) that are desirable. The four letters of the Tetragammatron may be used to focus and ground people. Other focusing phrases include Modeh Ani/Modah Ani ("I give thanks"), which comes from the prayers said upon waking. Meditators may also be guided to contemplate loving-kindness, or to contemplate interdependence (the latter is not a common Jewish doctrine, and comes from Buddhism). Participants are encouraged to make small donations in a collection box after sessions, which draws both on the Jewish idea of tzedakah and the Buddhist practice of dana (giving) that is usually done after a meditation class.

Buddhist meditation classes and meetings in Jewish institutions usually exclude things that may be seen as incompatible with Judaism to ensure Jews of all backgrounds are comfortable. This includes bowing, statues of Buddha, and altars. They also usually do not discuss Buddhist metaphysics such as rebirth, enlightenment, or realms of existence. This is true even if the teacher personally does not have an issue with these practices (and themselves has bowed to Buddha images or has an altar at home) or if students do not have an issue with it. During one Jewish retreat, Boorstein and her collaborating rabbi were nervous about the presence of a Buddha statue in a meditation room potentially being offputting to their students and put it in a closet. At another retreat, she was asked to leave it in place and decided to orient the seating in the room to face away from it. When later discussing the struggle over this, one of the Jewish students remarked, "you didn't need to put the Buddha in a closet".

Buddhist concepts (like metta) and practices (like removing shoes) are often connected to or reinterpreted in Jewish terms at these classes. Metta will be connected to chesed. Suffering, craving and ego will be connected to teachings against idolatry (Muslims trying to encourage interfaith dialogue have also made this comparison), and removing shoes will be connected to how Moses was told to remove his shoes in the presence of God at the burning bush. Jewish symbols with similar intentions will be substituted for Buddhist ones. This is often referred to as "translation", and Jewish teachers and facilitators of meditation will refer to themselves as "translators" looking for Buddhist ideas expressed with Jewish vocabulary. Original Jewish elements are also present, such as reading the weekly Torah portion and using parts of Jewish prayer as mantras. Jewish mystical traditions, such as Kabbalah and Hasidic practices, are also incorporated by some, though others are opposed to this (sometimes viewing these additions as questionable recreations of practices that may not have existed, or that these practices are too complex and require a high level of scholastic achievement that makes them unsuitable for Jewish laity). These meetings also emphasize egalitarianism in contrast to Orthodox gender segregation, and use gender neutral language for God. Overall, syncretic or dual faith Jewish Buddhists are almost never Orthodox Jews, and instead belong to the more liberal branches of Judaism.

Individual Jews may also host meditation classes and retreats in their homes, especially on Shabbat and in connection to Jewish holidays. Some combine zazen with prayers, or use candle lighting rituals and shofar blasts to enhance the experience of meditation.

Buddhist meditation (often with its esoteric and monastic elements de-emphasized) is very popular among American Jews. Mindfulness in Jewish meditation classes will often be presented as a secular, psychological phenomena. Some dually religious Jewish Buddhists have also sought to incorporate Buddhist meditation into Shabbat observance. This effort is particularly indebted to Sylvia Boorstein and her collaborators, such as Rabbis Weinberg, Shefa Gold, Miles Krassen, Joanna Katz, and Jeff Roth.

The method Jewish leaders use to blend Buddhism and Judaism is not systematic. It is often "whatever works". Most do not discuss a particular pressure or concern about accepted versus transgressive religious mixing, or about taking parts of Buddhism and discarding others. They also rarely police or try to create firm religious boundaries between Buddhism and Judaism. They express that being afraid of what is "outside" is a distraction and that they simply take what is good from Buddhism and leave the rest behind. What is "good" is decided based on personal feelings and experiences, not on religious rulings or laws. Whatever feels irrelevant, not useful, or uncomfortable is discarded. To an extent this is also applied to Judaism by dually religious and syncretic Jews, though the power relationship is different in how each religion is regarded.

Some Jews do have hard lines on what they feel can be incorporated and what can't, while acknowledging that cross religious communication and diffusion was nothing new. Rabbi Alan Lew expressed that meditation which visualizes Hindu deities and uses their mantras, for example, is not kosher. Anything that contradicts mainstream Jewish theology too strongly is likely to be avoided out of deference for these stances.

Those who promote meditation in Jewish spaces do so often by emphasizing the psychiatric perspective of it. Others also emphasize meditation as restoring a spiritual element of Judaism that has been missing in America. This is not universal: Rabbi Lew felt American Judaism was a rich spiritual path that nonetheless, benefitted from the addition of Buddhist influenced meditation. "Over the years, in the course of these activities, we have used dozens of classical Jewish texts to support the integration of meditation into Jewish contexts. Laying these texts end to end, we began to see that taken as a whole they delineated a clear spiritual path of their own— a kind of soul within the body of Jewish ritual, a spiritual companion practice standing side by side with normative Judaism and supporting it, helping it to reach its full natural depth."

Jewish supporters of meditation also try to find historical precedent for it in Judaism. Contemplative practices (called hitbodeut) do exist in Judaism, especially in mystical traditions. These practices were different from Buddhist meditation, but promoters present the latter as new forms of the old practice. As a result of all these factors, many of those involved in Jewish meditation classes as students are only vaguely aware they are derived from Buddhism. Nonetheless, Jewish engagement with Buddhism in this space when people are aware is seen as spiritual.

Many Jews who have particularly syncretic relationships to Buddhism report that using Buddhist practices helped them better appreciate Judaism and understand it as a spiritual practice. This was often the use of mindfulness or from Buddhist teachings that other religions also had truths in them. Buddhism helped them appreciate the intentions behind prayer and tzitzit, seeing them as exercises to build spiritual awareness. Many of them reported a difficult or loving yet unfulfilled relationship to Judaism before interacting with Buddhism.

=== Seders ===
Some JewBus hold "Zen seders", combining traditional Jewish Passover traditions with Zen Buddhism. These may include opening the ritual meal by explaining the similarities between the Passover narrative to Sakyamuni Buddha's liberation from suffering. In the 90s, many Jews also held seders aimed at raising awareness regarding Tibet. Others who identify entirely as religiously Buddhist and only ethnically Jewish have tried to create ceremonies that use the structure of a Jewish seder with content derived from Buddhism.

A haggadah titled "Haggadah for Jews & Buddhists" was published in 2007. It used nondualist theology in an attempt to explicitly bridge a gap between Buddhism and Judaism, connecting the Jewish mystical aim of unity with God to Buddhist practices directed at Enlightenment, indirectly proposing that God (presented as Truth and that which understands Truth) is synonymous with Nirvana. It cautions expected Buddhism attendees that, "Lest the Buddhists be offended by the traditional Peasch format and prayers, it is worth remembering that wherever Buddhism has taken root in a new land it is always blended with the local cultures. This flexibility created the variations in different branches of Buddhism. This haggadah is merely another step in the process. Buddha taught differently according to the place, the occasion, and the situation of those listening to him. The most important thing is putting the essence of Dharma teaching into practice in the fabric of our current lives." The haggadah connects the oppressive force represented by Egypt in Exodus to internal disconnects, attachments, and dissatisfactions that can be addressed through Buddhist practice. It incorporates moments for contemplation and mindfulness and blesses Buddha and bodhisattvas alongside Jewish prophets. It also incorporates religious poetry from Buddhism alongside traditional Jewish prayers. The wording at points does still create a divide between "Jew" and "Buddhist" as religious identities, but the material itself is syncretic, bringing many Buddhist ideas in as also being Jewish ideas.

Some Jews also hold Buddhist inspired Rosh Hashana seders. Rosh Hashana seders are a lesser known practice mainly associated with Sephardi and West Asian Jews that is seeing a broader popularization among American Jews.

=== Miscellaneous ===
Many Jewish Buddhists hold conferences and retreats that seek to blend Buddhism and Judaism and to encourage ethnically Jewish Buddhists to reconnect with Judaism as a religion.

Some Jews engage with koan study and compare it to Torah study.

== Tensions ==
=== Race ===
Most Jews in the US, including Jewish Buddhists (and indeed, most convert Buddhists in the US) are white. This means the perspective Jews have on Buddhism is influenced by race- during surges of anti-Asian racism (such as during World War Two), Jews are less likely to speak positively of Buddhism or be interested in learning about it. Additionally, Jews have power over Buddhists in many social contexts, such as when it comes to property rights and intracommunal decisions over where the Buddhist community should be oriented. Jewish Buddhists are more likely to remove Asian cultural context from Buddhism, and less likely to socialize with Asian Buddhists or participate in Asian Buddhist practices like holidays. The more religiously Jewish a Jewish Buddhist is, the more true this is likely to be. However, as more Jews take part in Tibetan traditions, some of this has lessened, due to Tibetan Buddhism not being as protestantized as Zen and Theravada Meditation in the US. However, Jewish Buddhists have also worked to help Asian Buddhists in times of distress, even if it involved confrontation with state authorities. Jewish Buddhists also sometimes use the same institutional spaces as Asian Buddhists and may have close friendships to Asian Buddhists.

=== Idolatry ===
According to the Ten Commandments and halakha (classical Jewish law), it is forbidden for Jews to worship any deity other than the God of Israel—specifically by bowing or offering incense, sacrifices, or poured libations, in Exodus 20:4-6. It is likewise commonly understood as forbidden to join or serve in another religion as doing so would render the participant an apostate or idol worshipper. On the surface, this makes some Jews and Buddhists skeptical of people who claim to be both, especially if they are practicing both religions simultaneously.

However, since many Buddhists do not consider the Buddha to have been divine in the same sense traditional Jewish theology and the Hebrew Bible understand, Jewish Buddhists do not consider Buddhist practice to be worship despite some practices, such as incense and food offerings made to a statue of the Buddha, as well as prostration and bowing to statues of the Buddha, having an outwardly worship-like appearance. Some Jews cite that the Buddha himself would not want to be prayed to, as is well known in scripture, making it clear the intention is not "praying to" Buddha. Some also do not consider the bow to be prayer simply because they are not doing it with the intention of prayer. In addition, many Buddhists do not worship the Buddha; instead, they "revere" and "express gratitude" for the Buddha's (and all buddhas') accomplishment of reaching Nirvana and compassionate teaching, respectively. Buddhists honor the Buddha for discovering and teaching the Dharma, enabling others to be freed from suffering and thus attain Nirvana. While the worry about what practice is permitted and what is not remains, with Orthodox leaning Jews being more likely to disapprove, even some Orthodox rabbis admit to being unsure if it is permitted or not, though they usually do not wish to be named.

It is also worth noting that early Buddhism likely did not use statues. Additionally, some Japanese Buddhists (especially in the Nichiren school) prefer to use a special form of calligraphy (gohonzon) on their altars instead of a statue to represent their reverence for Buddha and bodhisattvas, though both may be used simultaneously. Some Jodo Shin Buddhists also prefer to use scrolls with the nembutsu or similarly important phrases written on them (myogo or "name" scrolls, named after the fact that they feature the name of a Buddha) instead of statues, with the Head Priest Rennyo reportedly burning wooden statues to heat his bath as an expression of their inferiority (alternatively, some claim this was just a way of disposing of statues that were falling apart).

It must also be admitted that among the general Buddhist community in Japan, this form of honzon is the least esteemed. This is likely due to being inexpensive to make, not as time consuming, and least visually impactful. The former two qualities are a factor in why calligraphic honzon are used in Jodo Shin, as Shinran made such scrolls as a gift to students as earnest keepsakes commemorating their visits and mainly taught his brand of Buddhism to poorer lay people. After he died they became highly prized. Later, Rennyo heavily promoted upon their use.

While similar in construction, the two schools' scrolls look quite different; the Nichiren gohonzon is modeled after the Tantric mandala, with a very complex meaning and many different names and invocations. By contrast the Jodo Shin myogo scroll usually features just one of three phrases, and Shinran himself was opposed to the Tantric culture in Tendai. However, the form of his own scrolls has precedent in the way bija (sacred syllables) are depicted, often with a lotus underneath. This latter imagery is also Tantric.

This reverence for sacred calligraphy has a parallel in Jewish reference for scripture and its quotations. Items that have certain things written in them (usually a sacred name of God) need to be buried when damaged beyond use or repair, which includes both Torah scrolls (which are handwritten by trained calligraphers) and prayer books (which are mass printed), among other items. Scriptural quotations are also sometimes made into calligraphy that is used during prayer to focus one's intentions, such as shivitis or mizrachs.

Some Jewish Buddhists do feel uncomfortable with the use of statues in prayer and meditation spaces and may prefer not to have them present. Some teachers may accommodate this while also demonstrating that the statue itself is unimportant to the tradition. Others will pre-emptively remove statues or have them not be present at all. Interestingly, some Jewish meditation groups will hold their sessions in the same room as a Torah ark, though close examination of if the Torah scroll is being used a substitute for traditional Buddhist imagery (such as statues) has not been done.

== See also ==
- Jews and Buddhism
- List of converts to Buddhism
- Jewish Buddhist
- Buddhism in Israel
- Creator in Buddhism
- Jewish meditation
