= Buddhism in Israel =

Israeli Buddhists בודהיסטים ישראלים

Total population
- 20,000 (2022); 0.3% of total population

Regions with significant populations
- Tel Aviv, Haifa

Religions
- Zen and Tibetan Buddhism

Languages
- Hebrew, English, other Asian languages

Buddhism in Israel refers to the Buddhist community living in Israel. Buddhism in Israel constitutes a minority.

== Historical context ==
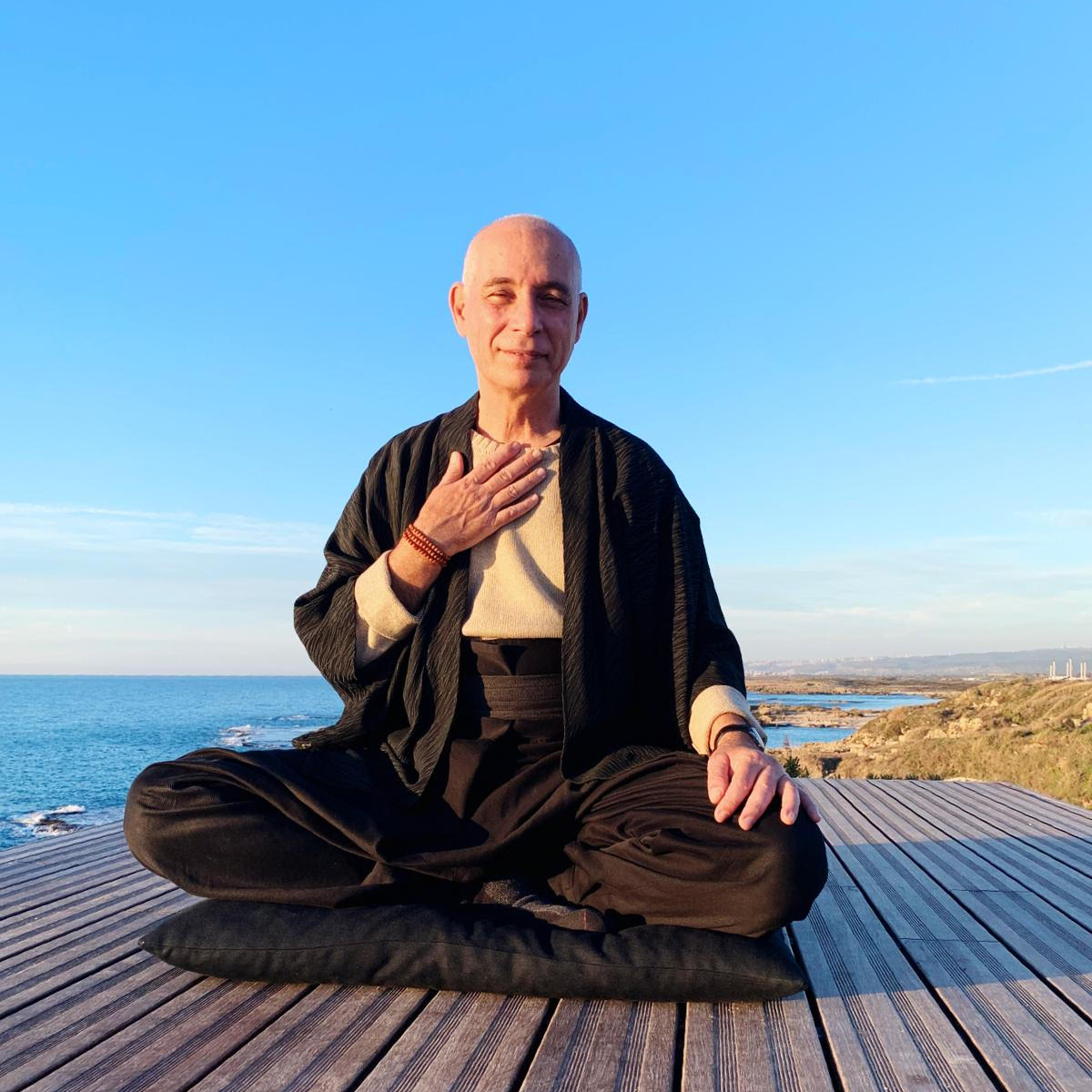
Nissim Amon is an Israeli Zen Buddhist born in Jerusalem

Buddhism was introduced to Israel in the mid-20th century, largely through the interest of David Ben-Gurion, Israel's first Prime Minister. In the 1950s, Ben-Gurion began a correspondence with Nyanaponika Thera, a distinguished German-born Buddhist monk, which lasted for six years and had a lasting impact on Ben-Gurion's understanding of Buddhist philosophy. In 1961, Ben-Gurion visited Burma (now Myanmar), where he spent time at a Buddhist retreat, further deepening his personal engagement with Buddhist practices

Following Ben-Gurion's interest, Buddhism began to gain attention in Israel. The 1960s and 1970s saw a growing interest in Eastern philosophies among Israelis, many of whom traveled to countries like India and Nepal, where they encountered Buddhist teachings. Upon returning, some individuals established meditation groups and centers, contributing to the gradual establishment of Buddhist communities within Israel.

The Dalai Lama has visited Israel three times: in 1994, 1999, and 2006.

An additional factor to Buddhism's introduction in Israel is that Jews and Buddhists have no history of communal conflict.

== Demography ==
The World Religion Database states that as of 2020, approximately 0.47% of Israel's population identifies as Buddhist.

Another source, NationMaster reported approximately 23,121 Buddhists in Israel in 2013, estimating for about 0.3% of the population at that time. That year, between 20 and 25 Buddhist centers were operating in Tel Aviv.

== Judaism and Buddhism ==
Practicing Buddhism in Judaism is seen as a violation of the prohibition against idol worship (avodah zarah), and those who convert to Buddhism are considered apostates. One key reason of the acceptance of Buddhism is its non-theistic nature. Buddhism does not involve a belief in God in the way that Judaism does, making it more accessible for Jewish agnostics and atheists. This allows them to embrace Buddhist practices without needing to make a significant change to their theological perspective.

It is pointed out by some observers that Judaism and Buddhism share a similar understanding of suffering. Throughout Jewish history, suffering has been a recurring theme, especially highlighted by the Holocaust which has shaped a theology of suffering that permeates contemporary Jewish culture, even among those who may feel disconnected from the faith. In Buddhism, the concept of suffering is central to its teachings on spiritual salvation, emphasizing both its causes and solutions. The Jerusalem Report quoted about an Israeli living in Dharamsala, a town in northern India where the Dalai Lama lives. The Israeli said, "It's very Jewish, you know, to always talk about suffering, just like Buddhists do."

== Buddhist centers in Israel ==
The Diamond Way Buddhism Centers are among the most prominent Buddhist establishments in Israel, with seven locations spread across the country. These centers are part of a network that includes over 650 meditation centers associated with the Karma Kagyu tradition of Tibetan Buddhism.

Tovana (the Israel Insight Meditation Society), established by Stephen Fulder and located in Kibbutz Ein Dor in the Galilee, offers a comprehensive range of Buddhist teachings and practices, aligned with the Theravada lineage, with an emphasis on mindfulness, calm and insight (Vipassana). Its teachings and practices are offered on a donation basis (dāna). Tovana holds many residential retreats throughout the year as well as lectures, meetings and weekly group practices in Ein Dor, Tel Aviv, and additional locations across the country. The organization is linked to a looser network of Western centers and teachers, such as the Insight Meditation Society in the United States and Gaia House in Britain.

== See also ==
- Jewish Buddhist
- Hinduism in Israel
- Religion in Israel
- Judaism and Buddhism
- Ehvam - International Spiritual Center for Peace
