= David Nichtern =

American musician and composer

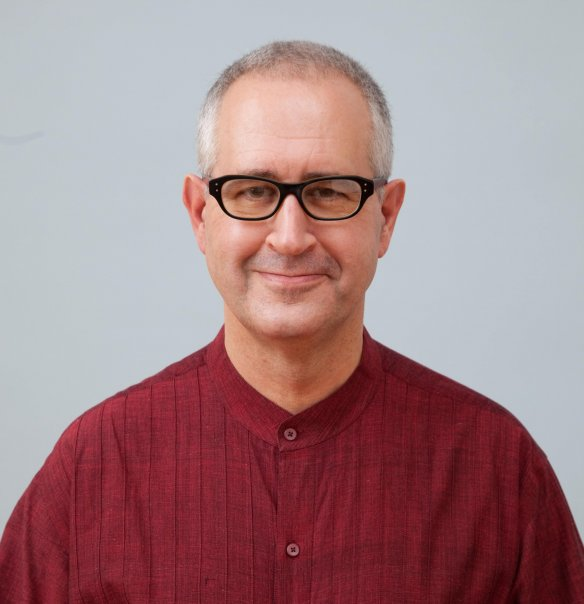
- Born: February 19, 1948 (age 78); Manhattan
- Occupations: Television, film, composer, songwriter, music industry, yoga
- Children: Ethan Nichtern

David Nichtern (born 19 February 1948) is an American songwriter and television composer, soundtrack artist and Buddhist teacher of the Shambala tradition of Chögyam Trungpa.

== Biography ==
Born and raised in Manhattan, Nichtern is the son of Sol Nichtern, a prominent New York psychiatrist and writer, and Broadway producer Claire Nichtern, the first female Tony Award winner. Having begun practicing music at age eight, he began his career as a professional musician during his college years at Columbia University. He served as director of sales for the New England Digital Corporation in the 1980s. He is the founder of music-marketing company Nudgie Music LLC and its divisions Dharma Moon and 5 Points Records. He wrote the song "Midnight at the Oasis."

He has his own world/fusion band, Drala.

Beginning in 1970, Nichtern became a student of the Shambhala Buddhist tradition of Tibetan Buddhism and was taught by the founder, Chogyam Trungpa Rinpoche. Nichtern has since become a senior teacher. Nichtern has been the Director of Expansion for Shambhala Training and co-director of the Karme Choling Meditation Center in Vermont.

Nichtern's son, Ethan Nichtern, is a Buddhist teacher and author.

== 5 Points Records ==
5 Points Records is a privately held label based in New York City founded by Nichtern. Its sister companies include the world-lifestyle label Dharma Moon, the custom label 5 Points V.I.P. and the music publishing company Nudgie Tunes.

The label's first release, the first installment of the Rare Elements series, included works by Sultan Khan remixed by modern artists, including Thievery Corporation.

== Awards and nominations ==
Nichtern was nominated for ten Daytime Emmy awards from 2000 to 2006, in the category "Outstanding Achievement in Music Direction and Composition for a Drama Series", for his work on One Life to Live and As the World Turns. He won the award in 2000 for One Life to Live, 2001 for As the World Turns and 2005 for One Life to Live. He was also nominated for a Grammy Award for Song of the Year for "Midnight at the Oasis."

== Composing credits ==
- The Student Teachers (1973)
- White Line Fever (1975)
- Sapphire Man (1988)
- The Big Picture (1989)
- One Life to Live (1995–2007)
- As the World Turns

== Soundtrack credits ==
- The Big Picture (1989)
- Perfect Witness (1989)
