= Jews and Buddhism =

- Directed by: Bill Chayes and Isaac Solotaroff
- Narrated by: Sharon Stone
- Release date: 1999
- Running time: 41 minutes
- Country: United States
- Language: English

Jews and Buddhism: Belief Amended, Faith Revealed (1999) is a documentary narrated by Sharon Stone that compiles interviews and archival footage of prominent Jewish, Buddhist, and Jewish-Buddhist personalities—including the Dalai Lama, David Ben-Gurion, Allen Ginsberg, Rabbi Allen Lew, and Sylvia Boorstein—to explore the new phenomenon of American Jews who have been drawn to Buddhist tradition.

== Summary ==
More than 30% of non-Asian Buddhists are Jews—and many have become leaders in the spiritual movement.

Beat poet Allen Ginsberg, who considered himself a non-theistic Jew, found solace in Eastern religion. A leader in the counterculture movement, Ginsberg explored Buddhist meditation and belief and expressed his spiritual discontent in his poetry. "Jerusalems hated walls, I couldn't get over the holy side and weep where I was supposed to by history," he wrote cynically about his trip to Israel in the poem "Angkor Wat", continuing, "Returning home at last, years later as prophesied, is this the way I'm supposed to feel?"

The film shows an archival television interview of Israel's first Prime Minister, David Ben-Gurion and his old friend, U Nu, the Buddhist former Prime Minister of Burma as they discuss religion. Before they begin, the Prime Minister from Burma blurts out, "How is your wife? How is Mrs. Ben-Gurion?" His question is full of genuine interest and sets the tone of their debate, what seems to be the understanding that their religious differences are trumped by something more important—their human connection.

== See also ==
- Jewish Buddhists
- Nyanaponika Thera
- Secular Jews
- The Jew in the Lotus
- Vipassana movement
