= Hinduism in Israel =

Israeli Hindus הינדים ישראלים

Total population
- ▲< 11,500 (2020); 0.1% of total population

Religions
- Hinduism; Majority: Vaishnavism; Minority: Shaivism

Languages
- Sanskrit (sacred); Hebrew, Arabic, English, Russian, French, Amharic, Tigrinya and other languages of Israel

Hinduism in Israel refers to the Hindu population in Israel. In 2020, about 0.1% of Israel's population were Hindus. Hindu organisations such as Sai Organisation and Sivananand Yoga Vedanta Centre are established in Israel.

== Hare Krishnas ==
A group of devotees is living in Katzir-Harish. Another Vaishnava community in Israel is in Israeli settlementis in west bank in israeli-occupied territory of Ariel. It is spearheaded by Jagadish and his wife, Jugala-Priti, and serves a growing community of devotees from Russia who immigrated to Israel to escape the severe economic oppression in the CIS. Jugala-Priti joined the ISKCON center in Tel Aviv, in 1996 guided by Gunavatar and Varshabhanavi.

== Hindu festivals in Israel ==
=== Krishna Janmashtami ===
Hindus are able to practice freely in the country. This is notably shown by the celebrations of Krishna Janmashtami. Plays are staged revolving around stories of Krishna's childhood, besides singing and dancing. The event is accompanied with a feast of 108 dishes, a number that has come to be identified as pious by the faithful. The organisers said they were inspired by Kumbh and started the event in Israel three years ago. Many of the visitors at the festival have been to India or are planning to visit. A number of youngsters could be seen taking Yoga classes and attending Hare Krishna lectures. Long queues were to be found outside the Indian ‘dhaba’ serving boiled rice and lentil soup. Middle aged couples, draped in Indian clothes, strolled the beach, young boys and girls drew circles on the soft sand while others surfed the morning sea.

== Sai Organisation in Israel ==
A Sai Organisation was officially established in Israel in 2001.

== Sivananda Yoga Vedanta Centre ==
The Israel branch was founded in 1971 by Swami Vishnudevananda, a direct disciple of Sri Swami Sivananda, of Rishikesh, India. The center is the largest and most comprehensive school in Israel for the study of yoga. Specific methods are taught such asanas (postures), pranayama (breathing yoga), stress management, vegetarian diet, positive thinking, and meditation.

Operations exist in the orchard, Eilat, Herzliya, Tel-Aviv, and the torch.

== Hindu Art and Culture ==
In 2023, 14 sculptures of Hindu deities were showcased in an exhibit at the Israel Museum. The exhibit, titled 'Body of Faith', was curated by Miriam Malachi.

== See also ==
- History of Jews in India
- Hinduism and Judaism
- Buddhism in Israel
