= Shay K. Azoulay =

Israeli writer

- שי אזולאי
- Born: December 24, 1979 (age 46); Tel Aviv
- Citizenship: Israel
- Occupations: novelist, playwright, translator
- Writing career
- Period: 2005–present
- Genre: Literary Fiction
- Website: skazoulay.wixsite.com/skazoulay/

Shay K. Azoulay (Hebrew: שי אזולאי) is an Israeli writer who writes in English and Hebrew.

== Novels ==
Azoulay's debut novel Lazaretto (לזארטו) was published in summer 2019 in Hebrew. A review in Haaretz described the novel as “an ambitious, high-tension novel, seeped in paranoia... Lazaretto is a disturbing and stirring dystopia which haunted me while I was reading it and even after I’d finished.” The novel was named "Book of the Year" by LaIsha Magazine which dubbed it "the novel that predicted the pandemic"

Azoulay's second novel Through No Wish of My Own (רכוש צבאי), chronicling a soldier's experiences in the IDF, was published in summer 2026 in Hebrew..

== Short stories ==
Azoulay has written a series of short stories grouped under the general title "Minor Writers of the Entropic Age". These stories include:

- "Jacob Wallenstein, Notes for a Future Biography", a work of fiction regarding a "forgotten" Israeli science fiction novelist and his 1,000 page magnum opus. In 2013 Azoulay submitted this story to Tablet magazine, claiming that it was a true account of the nonexistent writer's life and work. An editor at the magazine was initially excited by the story, but eventually discovered that it was a hoax, though he decided to publish the story anyway, together with a forward explaining his discovery of the hoax.. A Hebrew version of the story was later anthologized in Mars is Here! A Hebrew Anthology of Speculative Fiction alongside works by Etgar Keret and Shimon Adaf
- "The Invention of H. P. Lovecraft" imagines the controversial author as an invention of Jorge Luis Borges (published in Flapperhouse Magazine, a Portuguese translation appeared in Revista Bang! magazine)
- "The Bard of Hastings" concerns a homeless poet who achieves online fame (published in The Cost of Paper).
- "Permaculture" about a soviet critic given an impossible task of consolidating all of Russian literature into a single volume (won second prize in the 2016 Zoetrope: All-Story short fiction contest).
- in "Routine" a writer tries to emulate the writing habits of his literary heroes (published in Crack the Spine magazine).

Other short works by Azoulay have appeared in The Molotov Cocktail and McSweeney's Internet Tendency. He has also written book reviews for The New York Times.

== Plays ==
Azoulay's debut play, "The Platoon", a satire about the IDF, won first place in the 2012 staged reading festival "Zav Kriah". The play was staged in Tel Aviv's Tzavtah Theater in 2014-2015 and received good reviews in the press, including a review by prominent theater critic Michael Handelzalts, who compared it to the work of Hanoch Levin. The play also stirred controversy, following an article which mistakenly claimed that the play depicts IDF soldiers raping Palestinian women. A member of the Tel Aviv municipal council sent a letter to the theater, demanding that they stop the staging of the play. Azoulay's other work includes the one-act play "Shade", which participated in the Tzavtah Theater's 2012 Short play Festival, and "Barabas" - a reimagining of Christopher Marlowe's "The Jew of Malta" staged as part of Yiddishpiel's 2018 staged reading festival.

== Translations ==
Azoulay also works as a Hebrew to English translator, translating non-fiction, children's literature, and plays, including works by playwright Hanoch Levin.
