= Nehirim =

American community of LGBTQ+ Jews

- Formation: 2004; 22 years ago
- Founder: Jay Michaelson
- Founded at: New York City
- Dissolved: 2015; 11 years ago
- Purpose: LGBT rights

Nehirim was a national community of lesbian, gay, bisexual, and transgender (LGBTQ) Jews, families, students and allies that was founded in 2004. The organization ceased operations at the end of 2015.

== History ==
Nehirim was founded in 2004 by Jay Michaelson. He served as Executive Director until 2010, when Michael Hopkins succeeded him. Rabbi Debra Kolodny assumed the role in 2013. Nehirim's Board of Directors included Corey Friedlander, Rabbi Joel Alter, Rabbi Julia Watts Belser, Rabbi David Dunn Bauer, Dr. Joel Kushner, and Dr. Alyssa Finn.

Nehirim means "lights" in Hebrew. The name comes from the Hebrew word Zohar, referring to the lights of heaven and rainbow colors seen at sunset. Its goal was to create and foster a more just and inclusive world based on the values of the Jewish tradition. Nehirim's primary programs were intensive weekend retreats and service programming promoting LGBT inclusion and equality. It was also a member of the Coalition for Liberty & Justice organized by Catholics for Choice and the National Council of Jewish Women and the National Religious Leadership Roundtable as part of the National Gay and Lesbian Task Force.

== Retreats ==
Nehirim retreats offered a means for LGBT Jews and their families to connect, learn, and grow together. Retreats have included East Coast gatherings at the Isabella Freedman Jewish Retreat Center in Connecticut, a transgender gathering at the Pacific School of Religion in Berkeley, California, student retreats at Boston University, West Coast gatherings at the Walker Creek Ranch in Petaluma, California, men's summer camps at the Easton Mountain Retreat Center in upstate New York, queer Jewish weekends in New York City at the Jewish Community Center of Manhattan, and women's retreats at the Isabella Freedman Jewish Retreat Center.

Nehirim's first retreat for LGBT rabbis, rabbinic pastors, cantors, and students was held in 2014 in San Francisco.
