= Moira Crone =

American fiction author

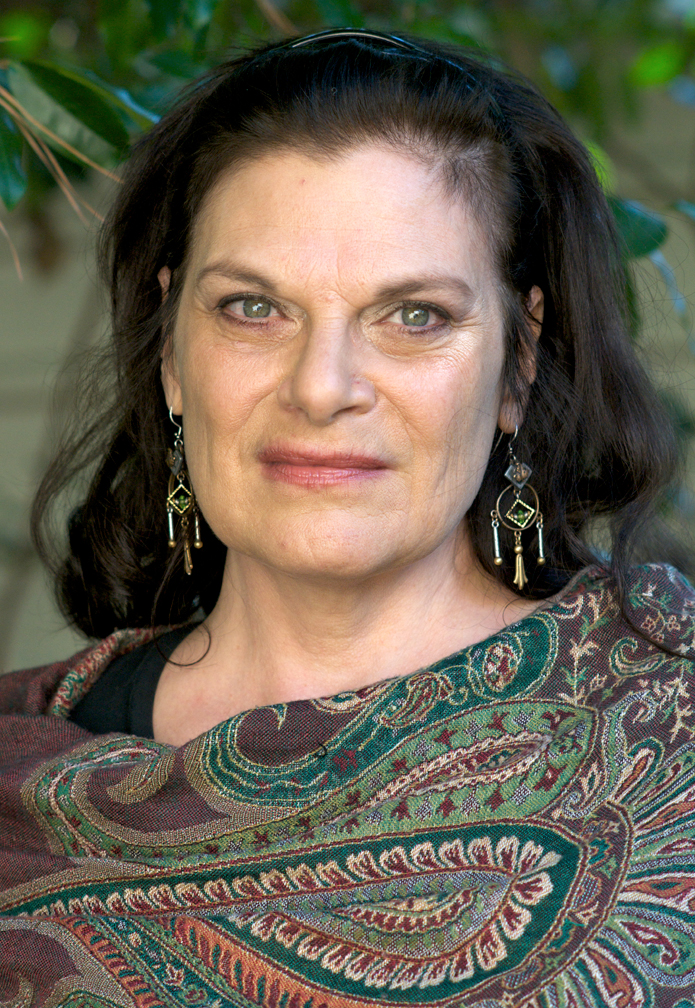
- Born: 1952 (age 73–74); Goldsboro, North Carolina, U.S.
- Occupation: Writer
- Spouse: Rodger Kamenetz
- Children: 2, including Anya
- Writing career
- Genre: Fiction

Moira Crone (born 1952) is a painter and American fiction author. She was born and raised in Goldsboro, in the tobacco country in eastern North Carolina. She is the author of three collections of short fiction and two novels. Her short stories have been classified as "Southern Gnostic", and as exemplifying the spirit of the New South. Her work has been compared to Flannery O'Connor's for its spiritual overtones and to Sherwood Anderson's for its depiction of small-town life and characters. She taught fiction writing at Louisiana State University, where she served for a number of years as Director of the MFA Program in Creative Writing and is now Professor Emerita. She also worked as fiction editor for the University Press of Mississippi. Her works have been chosen for the "Year's Best" by the award anthology New Stories From The South five times. In 2009, she was awarded the Robert Penn Warren Award in Fiction from the Fellowship of Southern Writers in recognition of her body of work. In the citation, Allan Gurganus wrote, "Moira Crone is a fable maker with a musical ear, a plenitude of nerve, and epic heart." Moira Crone lives in New Orleans. She is married to poet and author Rodger Kamenetz and has two daughters, author Anya Kamenetz and Kezia Kamenetz.

== Literary career ==
Moira Crone's first book The Winnebago Mysteries was published in 1982 by the Fiction Collective and praised by John Barth as "a pure delight." The story "Kudzu" with its tobacco country setting and frustrated father presaged her later work in What Gets Into Us. The debut novel that followed. A Period of Confinement (Putnam, 1985) was listed as new and noteworthy by The New York Times, which commented, 'This is a first novel that makes you sit up and pay attention." The novel set in Baltimore in the late 70's tells of "the confinement of Alma Taylor, a young artist, begins when she falls in love; then she gets pregnant, marries and finally flees to New York." Publishers Weekly found "much to savor in this small, deeply affecting novel, written in the voice of a woman who abandons her baby and husband in a depressed, confused postpartum "period of confinement." In 1981 Crone moved to Louisiana to teach at Louisiana State University and began writing stories set in Baton Rouge and New Orleans, among them Oslo which appeared in The New Yorker. The Louisiana stories were gathered in Dream State, often depicting the plight of "transplanted Northerners" who "feel trapped in Louisiana, where "all the big questions are still left open.. are women people, did Elvis die, was slavery wrong?" The New York Times Book Review praised her "fresh version of the Deep South, one that is exotic without being either grotesque or romanticized" and reported that "the sensibility embodied in Ms. Crone's energetic fiction ...is utterly sui generis." Turning her attention to her childhood in eastern North Carolina, Crone's next collectionWhat Gets Into Us recreates the life of a small town in the Carolinas, as seen across racial and class lines over a period from the 1950s to the present. Writing for Popmatters, Phoebe Kates Foster states: " What Gets Into Us is a complex and remarkable book that deserves to be read slowly and re-read meditatively. Like the works of Flannery O'Connor, this collection transcends the genre of "Southern Literature" and probes deeply into the paradoxes of the psyche and the zeitgeist of modern America...Crone has the lyric touch of a poet and the visionary spirit of a mystic, conjuring images that are both disturbing and startlingly beautiful. The reader will never forget Claire McKenzie's last memory of her mother or Sidney Byrd's symbolic dream about her dead friend Pauline or Lily Stark's stunning vision that closes this collection. Though Crone provides no easy way out for the tormented individuals of Fayton, North Carolina, there is redemption in this book. Like her characters, the reader just has to have faith in the midst of darkness and look for it. Recently Crone has ventured into speculative fiction with the 2012 publication of "The Not Yet", which Publishers Weekly described as "an impressive genre debut with a strong literary voice...". Reviewer Greg Langley wrote: "... What Crone has combined is wry social commentary in the vein of Swift or Voltaire with a dystopian coming-of-age tale. It's a brilliant book full of adventure and humor and no small amount of pathos. Best of all, Crone uses her book to ask what it means to be human, a question all of us Nats need to keep asking ourselves. (Baton Rouge Advocate). The Not Yet was a finalist for the Philip K. Dick Award for best science fiction of the year in paperback format. In 2014, she published The Ice Garden. (Carolina Wren, now Blair Publishing).

== Awards ==
Moira Crone has been selected for an individual artist's grant from the National Endowment for the Arts, (1990) and a fellowship at the Mary Ingraham Bunting Institute of Radcliffe College at Harvard, (1987–1988.) She won the Pirate's Alley Faulkner Society Short Story Prize in 1994, and William Faulkner/Wisdom Award for Novella in 2004. She won an ATLAS grant from the State of Louisiana in 2005-2006. She received the Robert Penn Warren award in Fiction from the Fellowship of Southern Writers in 2009. She was a finalist for the Philip K. Dick Award for original science fiction in 2012. The Ice Garden won the Independent Press Awards Gold Medal for Fiction, southeast.

== Books ==
- "The Ice Garden"
- "The Not Yet"
- "What Gets Into Us"
- "Dream State"
- "A Period of Confinement
- "The Winnebago Mysteries and other stories"
