= Pardes Publishing =

- Founded: 2000
- Country of origin: Israel
- Headquarters location: Haifa
- Key people: David Gottesmann, Zohar Efron
- Publication types: Books
- Official website: www.pardes.co.il

Pardes Publishing (Hebrew: פרדס הוצאה לאור) is an independent Israeli publishing house founded by David Gottesmann in 2000 and located in the city of Haifa, Israel. Pardes publishes fiction, non-fiction and poetry in Hebrew, Arabic and English. Notable writers include Tamar Gozansky, Stephen Fulder, and Asaf Hanuka.
