= Debra Kolodny =

American rabbi

Debra Kolodny is a bisexual rights activist and congregational rabbi. They served in the past as Executive Director of Nehirim.

== Background ==
Kondny came out as bisexual in 1984 and has continued to be open about their orientation in the context of rabbinic ministry.

They edited the first anthology by bisexual people of faith, Blessed Bi Spirit (2000), to which they contributed "Hear, I Pray You, This Dream Which I Have Dreamed", about Jewish identity and bisexuality.

Kolodny was the National Coordinator of BiNet USA for five years and facilitator of the National Gay and Lesbian Task Force's National Religious Leadership Roundtable from 1998 until 2004. Kolodny was also interviewed by several major news outlets for stories on bisexuality, such as the Philadelphia Inquirer and the Toronto Globe and Mail.

Kolodny joined Pnai Or, Portland's Jewish Renewal congregation, as its rabbi in September 2011. Before moving to Portland, they served for 9 years as the executive director of ALEPH: Alliance for Jewish Renewal. Kolodny also served the northern Virginia community of Shoreshim for four years, was a lay leader at Fabrangen in Washington, D.C., for 13 years and was the founder and spiritual leader of the Pnai HaSadeh learning minyan for five years. In March 2013 Kolodny began to split their time between P'nai Or and Nehirim, a national community of LGBT Jews, families, and allies, where Kolodny serves as Executive Director.
