= Ethan Nichtern =

American author & Buddhist teacher (born 1979)

- Born: 1979 (age 46–47) Los Angeles, California, United States
- Parents: David Nichtern (father); Janice Ragland (mother)

Ethan Nichtern is an American author and Buddhist teacher. He is based in New York City. His books include The Road Home: A Contemporary Exploration of the Buddhist Path (2015, FSG North Point Press), The Dharma of The Princess Bride (2017, FSG North Point) and Confidence: Holding Your Seat Through Life's Eight Worldy Winds (2024, New Work Library).

Nichtern has discussed the relevance of Buddhism in the 21st century on ABC/Yahoo News, CNN, NPR ABC News, Vogue.com, and The New York Times.

Nichtern is the son of musician/composer David Nichtern, who is also a Buddhist teacher, and Janice Ragland, a painter who later became a psychotherapist. He was born in Los Angeles, California in 1978 and raised in New York City. In 2016, he married Marissa Dutton and the two separated and later divorced in 2021.
