= Rodger Kamenetz =

American poet and author (born 1950)

Rodger Kamenetz (born 1950) is an American poet and author best known for The Jew in the Lotus (1994), an account of the historic dialogue between rabbis and the XIV Dalai Lama. His poetry explores the Jewish experience and in recent years, dream consciousness. Since 2003 he has been instrumental in developing Natural Dreamwork, a practice that focuses on the sacred encounters in dreams.

== Life and career ==
Kamenetz was born in Baltimore and educated at Yale, Stanford and Johns Hopkins University. He lives in New Orleans and is Professor Emeritus, retiring with a dual appointment as Professor of English and Professor of Religious Studies at LSU where he was also an LSU Distinguished Professor and Erich and Lea Sternberg Honors Professor. He works privately with clients, using dreams in a process of spiritual direction. Kamenetz is married to Moira Crone, a painter, novelist, and short story writer. He is the father of Anya Kamenetz, also an author, and Kezia Kamenetz.

=== Poetry ===
At the age of 16, Kamenetz entered Yale University, where he gave readings and published with poets Alan Bernheimer and Kit Robinson (later associated with the Language poets), and studied with Ted Berrigan. His first book, The Missing Jew (Dryad, 1979), was influenced by the Objectivist poets, especially Charles Reznikoff, whom he met at Stanford in 1973. Both poets relied on plain diction and paid attention to American Jewish identity and culture. Another enduring influence was Robert Duncan (poet), whom Kamenetz also met at that time, and later interviewed extensively about Duncan's interest in the Zohar and Jewish mysticism. Kamenetz typed The Missing Jew on a single continuous scroll, and the poems developed as commentaries on previous poems, as in the Jewish literary tradition of midrash. Joel Lewis, writing in The Forward, said, "Mr. Kamenetz recovers Jewishness as a field for discourse, not sentimentalized imagery. In direct and imaginative address, he puts the question of Jewishness under discussion with large parts of honesty and humor." Kamenetz continued to add to the book, and a new edition, nearly double in size, appeared in 1991 as The Missing Jew: New and Selected Poems (Time Being, 1991). His poems were anthologized in Voices Within the Ark (Avon, 1979), Jewish American Poetry (Brandeis, 2000), Jewish in America (U. of Michigan Press), Bearing the Mystery (Eerdmans), Best Jewish Writing 2003 (Jossey Bass), Blood to Remember: American Poets on the Holocaust (Time Being), Telling and Remembering: a Century of American Jewish Poetry (Beacon, 1997), and The Prairie Schooner Anthology of Contemporary Jewish American Writing (Nebraska, 1998). In The Lowercase Jew (Northwestern, 2003), Kamenetz adopted a form of verse essay to address issues of literary anti-Semitism. The title poem speaks to T.S. Eliot's use of a lower case spelling of "jew" in his poetry; another retells an incident in which "Allen Ginsberg Forgives Ezra Pound on Behalf of the Jews." Kamenetz's sixth book of poetry, "To Die Next To You" (Six Gallery Press, 2013) derives primarily from his experience with dreamwork. His next book of poetry, "Yonder" (Lavender Ink, 2019) "brims with respect for the prose poetry genre, with homages to forebears from Baudelaire to Max Jacob, Russel Edson to Kafka." Dream Logic (PURH, 2020) continues his sequence of prose poems devoted to dream consciousness. Kamenetz's latest book of poetry The Missing Jew:Poems 1976-2022 marks the harvesting of 46 years of work with an additional 30 years of poems since the previous edition.

=== Autobiography ===
After the death of his mother in 1980, Kamenetz turned from poetry to the autobiographical essay in Terra Infirma (University of Arkansas, 1985) and reprinted by Schocken Books in 1999. The book is structured as the interpretation of a single dream of his late mother, which Kamenetz modeled on Michel Butor's Histoire extraordinaire: essai sur un rêve de Baudelaire (1961).

=== Jewish-Buddhist dialogue ===
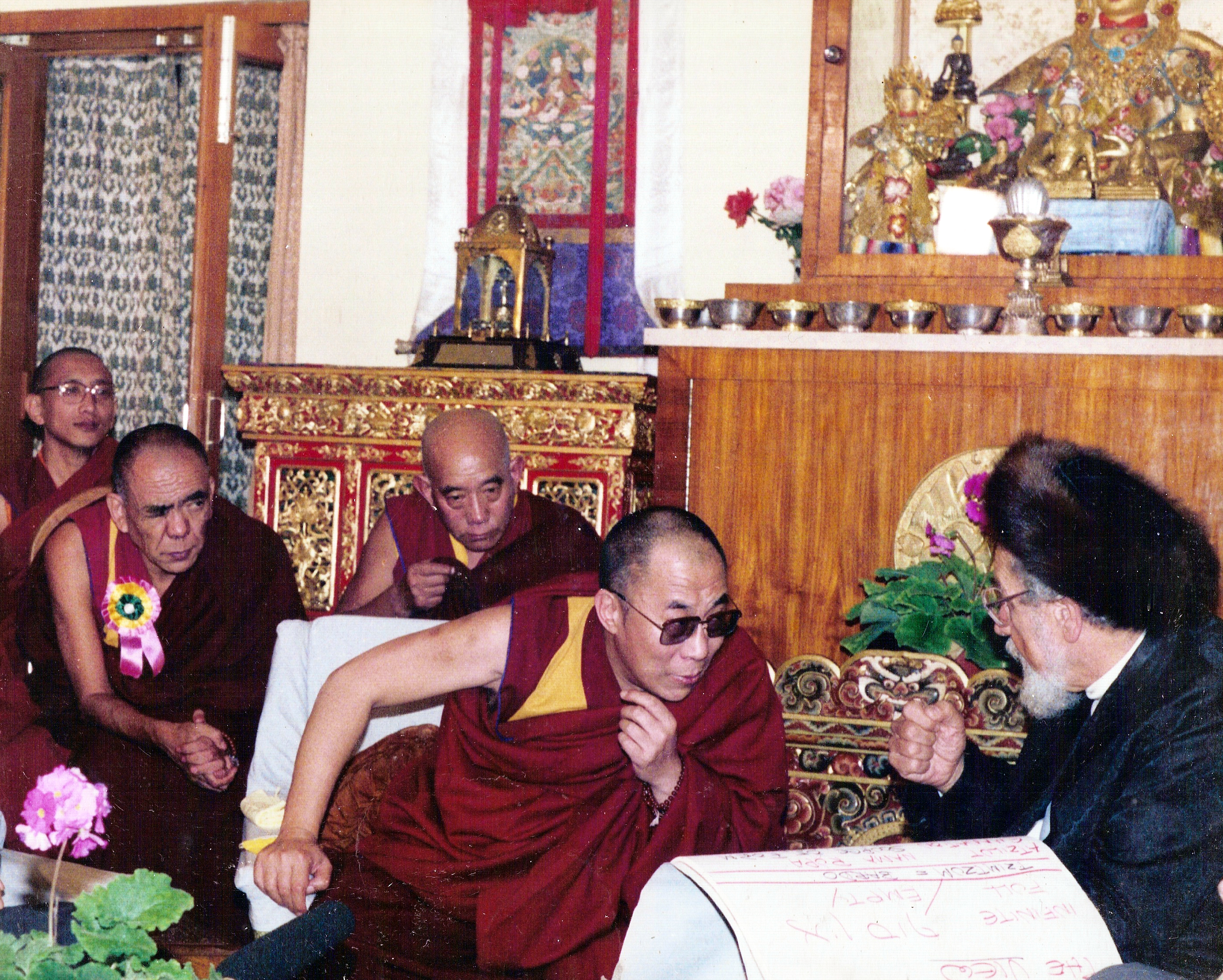
The XIV Dalai Lama and Rabbi Zalman Schachter-Shalomi during the historic Jewish-Buddhist dialogue in Dharamsala, India, October 25, 1990

In October 1990, Kamenetz was invited to observe an historic dialogue between rabbis and the XIV Dalai Lama in Dharamsala, India. The Dalai Lama had asked the Jewish delegates to share with him "the secret of Jewish spiritual survival in exile." His account of this exchange, The Jew in the Lotus (1994), was a popular success and became an international best-seller. Writing in the New York Times, Verlyn Klinkenborg cited its broader relevance as a book "about the survival of esoteric traditions in a world bent on destroying them." The book was primarily potent in capturing an ongoing engagement in the US between Jews, often highly secularized, and Buddhist teachings. Kamenetz popularized the term JUBU or Jewish Buddhist, interviewing poet Allen Ginsberg, vipassana teacher Joseph Goldstein, Ram Dass and other American Jews involved with bringing Eastern traditions to the West.

- The book also made prominent a Jewish mystical response to Eastern spirituality in the Jewish renewal movement, led by Rabbi Zalman Schachter-Shalomi, and Jewish meditation as taught by Rabbi Jonathan Omer-Man. From a perspective of thirty years after publication Rabbi Dr. Jay Michaelson summarizes the book's impact, "Outside the academy, by far the most influential text on Buddhism and Judaism is Rodger Kamenetz's 1994 bestseller, The Jew in the Lotus. On one level, Lotus is a travelogue, recounting a historic (or quixotic) meeting between an assortment of rabbis and the Dalai Lama. But because Kamenetz perceptively and astutely detailed the participants' varying ways of relating to Buddhism, including his own, it became a kind of BuJu bible. It did not recount history so much as make it. It would not be an exaggeration to divide American Buddhist Jewish life into the time before and after Lotus's publication."

The Jew in the Lotus inspired a PBS documentary of the same name produced and directed by Laurel Chiten, released theatrically in New York, Los Angeles and Boston, and subsequently on Independent Lens on September 1, 1999. "The Jew in the Lotus" was named by Moment Magazine as one of the top 50 Jewish books of the past 50 years. Kamenetz followed The Jew in the Lotus with Stalking Elijah: Adventures with Today's Jewish Mystical Masters (Harper, 1997), which received the National Jewish Book Award for Jewish Thought in 1997. Kamenetz interviews a number of Jewish leaders who attempt to blend together Jewish mysticism, feminism and innovations in prayer and meditation practice. Among them were Rabbis Zalman Schachter-Shalomi, Jonathan Omer-Man, Arthur Green and Shefa Gold. The book ends with the account of a seder held in Dharamsala India, which included as guests the Tibetan teacher Geshe Sonam Rinchen. During that same visit, Kamenetz met with the Dalai Lama, which inspired him to work with the Interfaith Action Network of the International Campaign to free the young Panchen Lama Gedhun Choekyi Nyima from Chinese government detainment. The world's youngest prisoner of conscience, the Panchen Lama's eighth birthday fell during the first week of Passover. Struck by this coincidence, Kamenetz created a nationwide campaign of Passover Seders for Tibet, uniting the Jewish memory of slavery and oppression in Egypt long ago with the lack of religious freedom in today's Tibet under Chinese rule. A special seder was held in Washington, D.C., on April 24, 1997 and attended by the Dalai Lama, as well as by numerous U.S. dignitaries and celebrities, including Supreme Court Justice Stephen Breyer and Adam Yauch of the Beastie Boys. The seder, as well as Kamenetz's visit with the Dalai Lama in 1997 was featured in the 1999 documentary, The Jew in the Lotus and is recounted in Stalking Elijah Schocken/Nextbook Press published Burnt Books in 2010 in its Jewish Encounters series. It is a dual biography of Rabbi Nachman of Bratslav and Franz Kafka that finds surprising commonalities in their writings and engages kabbalah as a form of modern literature.

=== Natural Dreamwork ===
In fall 2007, Harper One published The History of Last Night's Dream which examines the spiritual possibilities of dreaming from Genesis to now. Oprah Winfrey interviewed the author about the book in a two-part XM radio broadcast in her Soul Series in August 2008. Since that time Kamenetz has been instrumental in shaping and articulating Natural Dreamwork a phenomenological approach focused on strong feelings held by the images in dreams.

== Seeing Into The Life of Things ==
Kamenetz's "Seeing into the Life of Things: Imagination and the Sacred Encounter" was named one of the best spirituality books of 2025 by Spirituality and Practice.com It received a Nautilus Book Awards Gold in the category of Religion/Spirituality of Western Thought. The book responds to a question from the Dalai Lama about overcoming afflictive states of mind and teaches practices for remembering moments of blessing, seeing into the life around us and finding the sacred encounters in our dreams

== Bibliography ==
- The Missing Jew (Dryad Press/Tropos Press, 1979) poetry.
- Nympholepsy (Dryad Press, 1985) poetry.
- Terra Infirma (U. of Arkansas Press, 1985) non-fiction.
- The Missing Jew: New and Selected Poems (Time Being Books, 1992) poetry.
- The Jew in the Lotus (Harper San Francisco, 1994) non-fiction.
- Stuck: Poems Midlife (Time Being Books, 1997) poetry
- Stalking Elijah (Harper San Francisco, 1997) non-fiction.
- Terra Infirma: a memoir of my mother's life in mine (Shocken, 1999) non-fiction, reprint.
- The Lowercase Jew (Northwestern, 2003) poetry.
- "The Jew in the Lotus (PLUS) With an afterword by the author." (HarperOne, 2007) non-fiction.
- The History of Last Night's Dream (HarperOne, 2007) non-fiction.
- Burnt Books: Rabbi Nachman of Bratslav and Franz Kafka (Schocken/Nextbook, 2010) non-fiction.
- "To Die Next To You" (Six Gallery Press, 2013) poetry
- "Yonder" (Lavender Ink, 2019) poetry
- "Dream Logic" (PURH, 2020) poetry
- "The Missing Jew: 1976-2022" (Ben Yehuda Press, 2022) poetry.
- "Seeing into the Life of Things: Imagination and the Sacred Encounter" (Monkfish Book Publishing, 2025) non-fiction.
