= Dana Goldstein =

American journalist and the author

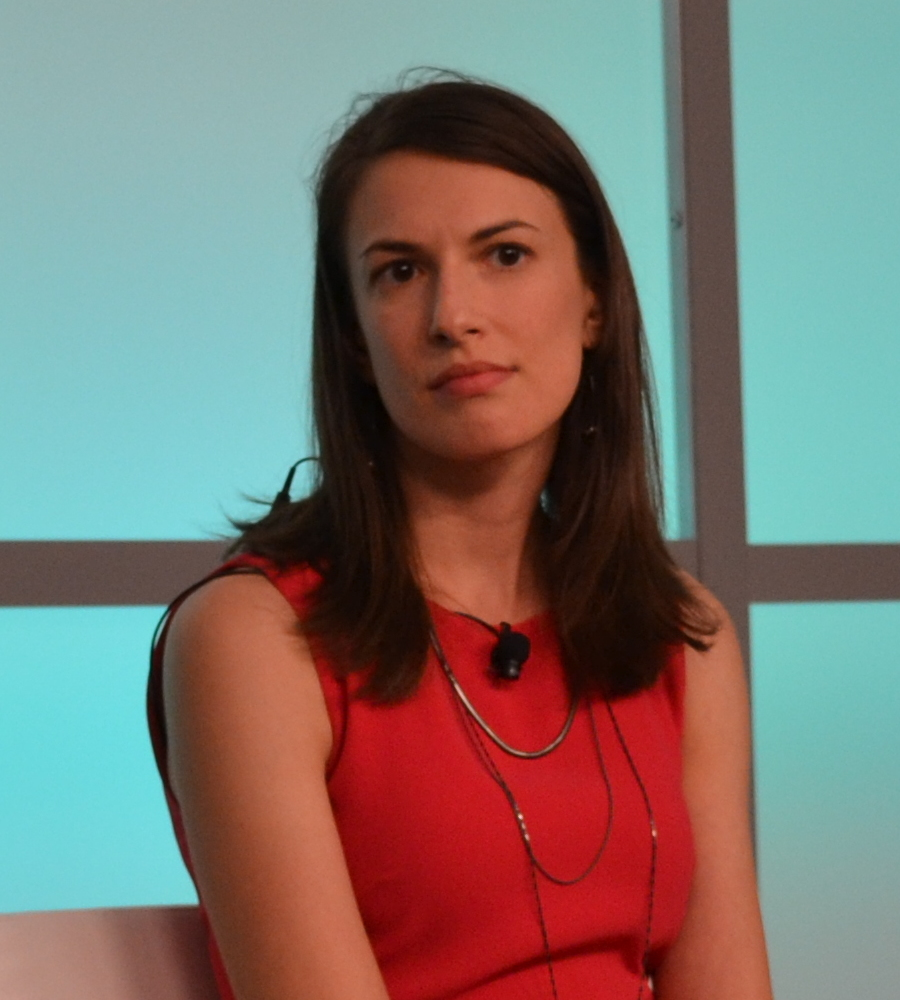
- Dana Goldstein in 2014
- Born: Oceanside, New York
- Education: Brown University
- Occupation: Journalist
- Notable credit(s): Slate, The Daily Beast, The New Republic, The Atlantic, The Marshall Project

Dana Goldstein is an American journalist and the author of The Teacher Wars, published by Doubleday and a New York Times best seller. She is currently a domestic correspondent at The New York Times and has worked as a staff writer at The Marshall Project and as an associate editor at The Daily Beast. She received a Bernard L. Schwartz fellowship from the New America Foundation, a Spencer Foundation Fellowship in Education Journalism from Columbia University, and a Puffin Fellowship from The Nation Institute. Her work on politics, education, and women's issues has appeared in national publications including The Atlantic, Slate, The New Republic, and Politico.

Goldstein grew up in Ossining, New York. She graduated from Brown University, where she studied European intellectual and cultural history with a focus on gender, in 2006. She lived and worked in Paris during 2004.
