= Shinzen Young =

American meditation teacher

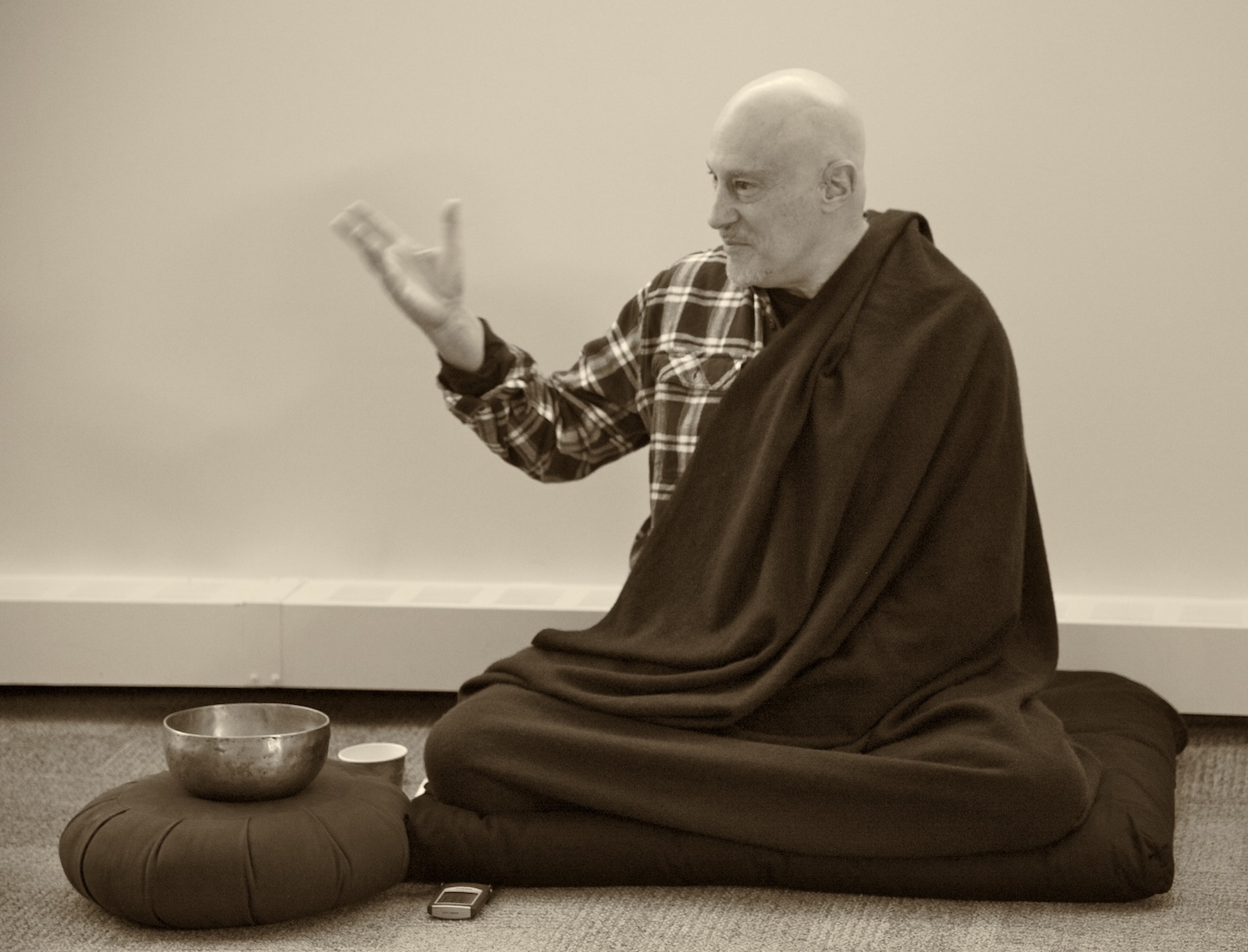
- Born: Steve Young; August 7, 1944 (age 82); Los Angeles, California
- Occupation: Meditation teacher
- Website: shinzen.org

Shinzen Young (真善, Shinzen) (born August 7, 1944) is an American meditation teacher. He leads residential and remote meditation retreats for students interested in learning the Vipassana (insight) tradition of Buddhism. He was originally ordained in Japan as a monk in the Shingon (Japanese Vajrayana) tradition. He has studied and practiced extensively in other traditions, including Zen and Native American traditions.

Young's interest in integrating meditation with scientific paradigms has led to collaborations with neuroscientists at Harvard Medical School, University of Massachusetts Medical School, Yale, Carnegie Mellon, University of Vermont, and the University of Arizona. He is working on various ways to bring a secular mindfulness practice to a wider audience using revamped terminology and techniques as well as automated expert systems. He published a book summarizing his system of meditation entitled The Science of Enlightenment in 2016.

== Life ==
Shinzen Young was born Steve Young in Los Angeles, California. His parents were Jewish. An irritable child and poor student, in middle school Young became fascinated with Asian languages and cultures, eventually becoming fluent in Japanese. After graduating from UCLA as an Asian Language major, he enrolled in the University of Wisconsin's Ph.D. program in Buddhist Studies. To gather materials for his doctoral dissertation, he spent several years at the Shingon monastery at Mount Kōya in Japan, where he was ordained as a monk in 1970 and received the name Shinzen. During these early years in Japan, and spurred by the tragic death of an academic mentor, he decided to leave the academic path to fully commit to the practice of meditation.

== Teaching ==
Young's teachings bring together elements of Buddhist schools such as Theravada, Zen, and Vajrayana, with an emphasis on traditional mindfulness meditation. He has adapted the central Buddhist concept of the five skandhas or aggregates into modern language, grouped them into sensory categories with potential neurological correlates, and developed an extensive system of meditation techniques for working with those categories individually and in combinations. He frequently uses concepts from mathematics as a metaphor to illustrate the abstract concepts of meditation. As a result, his teachings tend to be popular among academics and professionals.

Young developed the Unified Mindfulness program, a system which trains and certifies teachers of meditation in accordance with Young's methods and terminology.

== Books ==
- Break Through Pain: A Step-by-Step Mindfulness Meditation Program for Transforming Chronic and Acute Pain (2006) ISBN 1-59179-199-5
- The Beginner's Guide to Meditation (2002) ISBN 1-56455-971-8
- The Science of Enlightenment: How Meditation Works (2016) ISBN 1-59179-460-9

== Audio publications ==
- The Science of Enlightenment (2005) ISBN 1-59179-232-0
- Pain Relief (2004) ISBN 1-59179-180-4
- Beginner's Mind: 3 Classic Meditation Practices Especially for Beginners (1999) ISBN 1-56455-733-2
- Break Through Difficult Emotions: How to Transform Painful Feelings With Mindfulness Meditation (1997) ISBN 1-56455-441-4
- Break Through Pain: How to Relieve Pain Using Powerful Meditation Techniques (1997) ISBN 1-56455-365-5
- Meditation in the Zone: How to Turn Your Workout into a High-Quality Meditation (1996) ISBN 1-56455-392-2
- Five Classic Meditations: Mantra, Vipassana, Karma Yoga, Loving Kindness, Kabbalah (1990) ISBN 1-55927-035-7 (2004) ISBN 1-59397-521-X
