= Stephen Fulder =

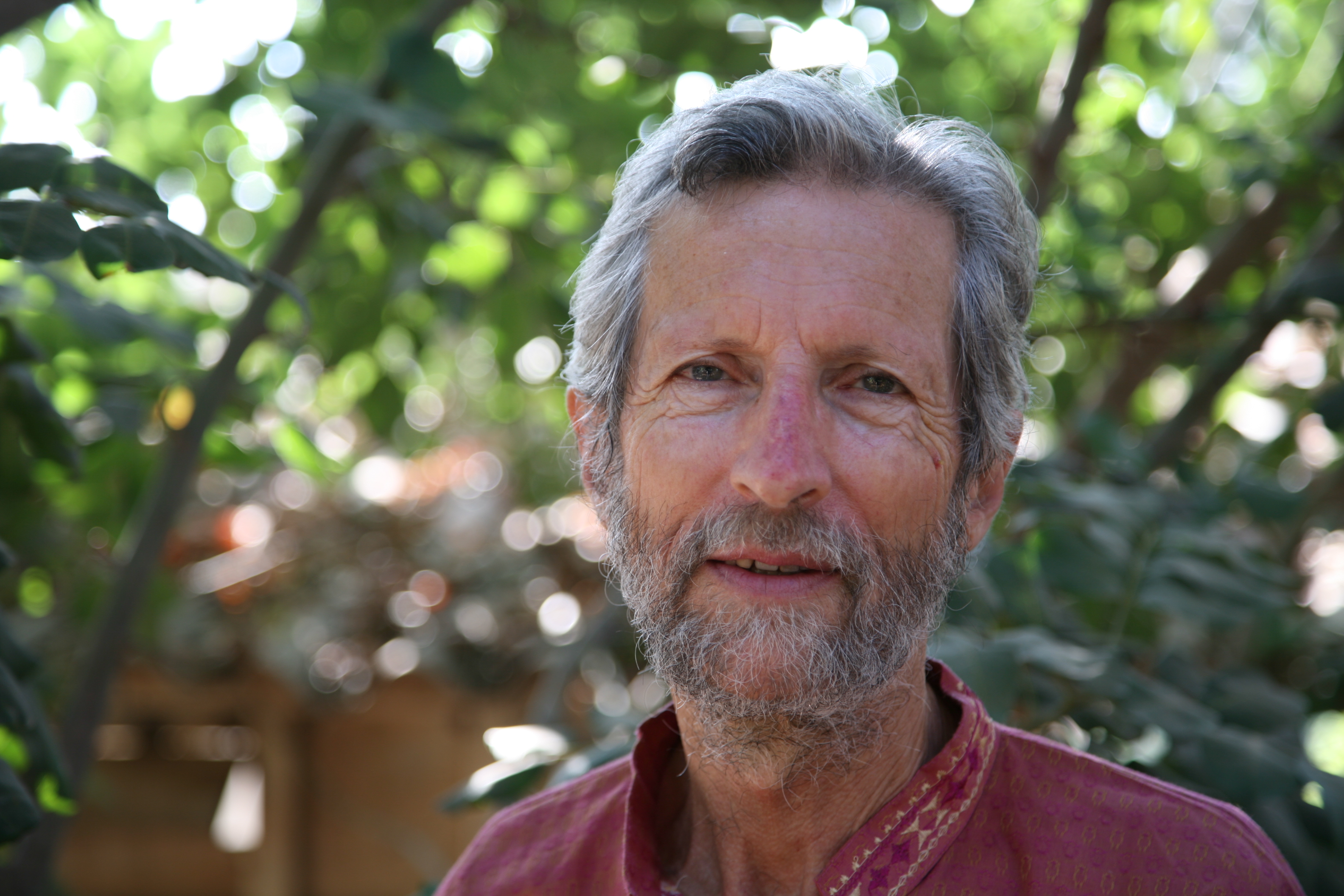
- Title: Dharma Teacher

Personal life
- Born: 1946 (age 79–80) London, England
- Occupation: Author, dharma teacher
- Website: https://www.stephenfulder.com/

Religious life
- Religion: Theravada background

Stephen Fulder (born 1946 in London, England) is the founder and senior teacher of the Israel Insight Society (Tovana), the major organisation in Israel teaching Buddhist meditative practice. He has worked since 1975 in the field of herbal and complementary medicine as an author, consultant and researcher, publishing many books and research papers. His latest book is: "What's Beyond Mindfulness: Waking Up to This Precious Life".

== Biography ==
Stephen Fulder was educated at University of Oxford and the National Institute of Medical Research, where he was awarded his PhD in Molecular Biology. He was a lecturer at London University. He is the founder and senior teacher of Tovana (the Israel Insight Society), a leading Buddhist practice organisation in Israel, teaching Mindfulness, Vipassana and dharma. He has been practicing meditation since 1975. He has been involved for many years in peace work in the Middle East and was a founder of the Middle Way organisation. He used to work in the field of herbs and alternative medicine about which he has written numerous books.

== Tovana (Israel Insight Society) ==
Stephen Fulder has established Tovana (the Israel Insight Society) which is a teaching organisation for the practice of attention in everyday life through insight meditation — Vipassana. Tovana is inspired by Buddhist tradition, philosophy and practice as a way of life. Tovana is linked to a looser network of Western centers and teachers, such as the Insight Meditation Society in the United States and Gaia House in Britain. It holds many residential retreats throughout the year as well as lectures, meetings and weekly group practices across the country.

== Bibliography ==
- Ageing and Somatic Mutations in Human Fibroblasts, Ph.D. Thesis, CNAA, London (1975).
- About Ginseng, Thorsons, HarperCollins, London (1976). ISBN 0722506597
- The Ginseng Book, Avery Press, New York (1996). ISBN 0895297205
- The Book of Ginseng, and other Chinese Herbs for Vitality, Healing Arts Press, Rochester, Vermont, (1993). ISBN 0892814918
- An End to Ageing?, Thorsons, HarperCollins, London, and Healing Arts Press, Rochester, Vermont, (1987). ISBN 0722507690
- The Handbook of Alternative and Complementary Medicine, Third edition, Oxford University Press, Oxford (1996). ISBN 0192626698
- Garlic, Nature's Original Remedy (with John Blackwood),Healing Arts Press, Rochester, Vermont (1991). ISBN 0892814365
- The Garlic Book. Avery Press, New York (1996). ISBN 0895297868
- How To Survive Medical Treatment, Third edition, C.W. Daniel, Saffron Walden, Essex (1994). ISBN 0852072791
- Towards a New Science of Health, (with R. Lafaille, co-editor), Routledge, London (1993). ISBN 0415081718
- The Ginger Book: Souvenir Press, London (1994). and Avery Press, New York, (1996).
- Potentiating Health and the Crisis of Immunity, (with A. Mizrachi, N. Sheinman, co-editors), Plenum, New York, (1996).ISBN 030645602-8
- FAQs: All About Garlic Avery Press, New York (1998). ISBN 0895298864
- FAQs: All About Ginseng, Avery Press, New York (1998). ISBN 0895298929
- User's Guide to Garlic, Basic Health Publications, Bergen, New Jersey (2005) ISBN 1-59120-135-7
- What's Beyond Mindfulness: Waking Up to This Precious Life Watkins (2019) ISBN 978-1-78678-198-7

== See also ==
- Buddhism in The Middle East
- Christopher Titmuss
- Joseph Goldstein
