= The Jew in the Lotus =

1994 book by Rodger Kamenetz

- First edition
- Author: Rodger Kamenetz
- Published: 1994 (Harper)
- ISBN: 9780061367397

The Jew in the Lotus is a 1994 book by Rodger Kamenetz about a historic dialogue between rabbis and the Dalai Lama, the first recorded major dialogue between experts in Judaism and Buddhism. The book was a popular success and became an international best-seller. Writing in The New York Times, Verlyn Klinkenborg cited its broader relevance as a book "about the survival of esoteric traditions in a world bent on destroying them." The book was primarily potent in capturing an ongoing engagement in the US between Jews, often highly secularized, and Buddhist teachings. Kamenetz popularized the term JUBU or Jewish Buddhist, interviewing poet Allen Ginsberg, vipassana teacher Joseph Goldstein, Ram Dass and other American Jews involved with bringing Eastern traditions to the West. The book also made prominent a Jewish mystical response to Eastern spirituality in the Jewish renewal movement, led by Rabbi Zalman Schachter-Shalomi, and Jewish meditation as taught by Rabbi Jonathan Omer-Man. The title is a pun on the Vajrayana mantra Om mani padme hum which is frequently interpreted as "hail to the jewel in the lotus".

First published in 1994 by Harper San Francisco, it is now on its 37th reprint. In fall of 2007 the paperback was reissued with an afterword that updated readers on Jewish-Buddhist dialogues. The Jew in the Lotus inspired a PBS documentary of the same name produced and directed by Laurel Chiten, released theatrically in New York, Los Angeles and Boston, and subsequently on Independent Lens on September 1, 1999.

Rabbi Dr. Jay Michaelson writes, "Outside the academy, by far the most influential text on Buddhism and Judaism is Rodger Kamenetz's 1994 bestseller, The Jew in the Lotus. On one level, Lotus is a travelogue, recounting a historic (or quixotic) meeting between an assortment of rabbis and the Dalai Lama. But because Kamenetz perceptively and astutely detailed the participants' varying ways of relating to Buddhism, including his own, it became a kind of BuJu bible. It did not recount history so much as make it. It would not be an exaggeration to divide American Buddhist Jewish life into the time before and after Lotus's publication."
