= Jay Michaelson =

American writer and academic

Jay Michaelson (born 1971) is an American writer, journalist, professor, and rabbi. He is a visiting scholar at the Emory Center for Psychedelics and Spirituality and was a visiting professor at Harvard Law School in 2025. Michaelson is a frequent commentator on CNN, and a contributor to Rolling Stone and other publications, having been the legal affairs columnist at The Daily Beast for eight years. He is the author of ten books, and won the 2023 National Jewish Book Award for scholarship and the 2023 New York Society for Professional Journalists Award for Opinion Writing.

== Journalism ==
Michaelson's journalistic work has focused on the intersections of religion and law. He has written on the Supreme Court, the legal recognition of psychedelics, LGBT issues, climate change, antisemitism, voter suppression, judicial nominations, and other subjects, and has been featured on CNN, MSNBC, and Meet the Press.

In 2013, Michaelson wrote the first long-form report on the right-wing religious exemptions movement, Redefining Religious Liberty: The Covert Campaign Against Civil Rights. Michaelson's work on this issue gained prominence a year later after the Hobby Lobby Supreme Court case and he has written many articles on religious liberty in Reuters, The Washington Post and other publications.

From 2004 to 2017, Michaelson was a columnist and contributing editor to The Forward newspaper. In 2009, his essay "How I'm Losing My Love for Israel" generated substantial controversy in the Jewish world, including responses from Daniel Gordis, and Jonathan Sarna, and prefigured the estrangement of progressive American Jews from the government of Israel. Michaelson was listed in the Forward 50 list of the most influential American Jews in 2009.

== Academic work ==
Michaelson's scholarly work in religious studies has focused on mystical experience, antinomianism, and sexuality. Michaelson holds a PhD in Jewish Thought from Hebrew University of Jerusalem, where he wrote his dissertation on the antinomian heretic Jacob Frank. His 2022 book on Frank, The Heresy of Jacob Frank: From Jewish Messianism to Esoteric Myth, was published by Oxford University Press and won the National Jewish Book Award for scholarship. He was an affiliated assistant professor at Chicago Theological Seminary and a visiting fellow at the Center for LGBTQ and Gender Studies in Religion and has held teaching positions at Boston University Law School and Yale University. Michaelson graduated from Columbia College of Columbia University in 1993, where he was a member of the Philolexian Society, and from Yale Law School in 1997.

Since 2021, Michaelson's work has focused on the intersection of psychedelics, law, and religion. In March 2025, he co-organized the first-ever conference on the legal recognition of religious psychedelic use in Christian, Jewish, and Muslim communities. He has written and spoken widely on the religious significance of psychedelic practice in Judaism. Michaelson is an affiliated researcher of Harvard Law School's Program in Psychedelic Use, Law, and Spiritual Experience.

Michaelson's other academic work in religious studies includes "Queering Martin Buber: Harry Hay's Erotic Dialogical" (Shofar, 2018), "Conceptualizing Jewish Antinomianism in the 'Words of the Lord' by Jacob Frank" (Modern Judaism, 2017); "The Repersonalization of God: Monism and Theological Polymorphism in Zoharic and Hasidic Imagination" (Imagining the Jewish God, 2016), "Queer Theology and Social Transformation Twenty Years after Jesus ACTED UP" (Theology and Sexuality, 2015), and "Kabbalah and Queer Theology: Resources and Reservations" (Theology and Sexuality, 2012).

Michaelson is also the author of several legal-academic articles, including "Rethinking Regulatory Reform: Toxics, Politics and Ethics" (Yale Law Journal, 1996), and "On Listening to the Kulturkampf, Or, How America Overruled Bowers v. Hardwick, Even Though Romer v. Evans Didn't" (Duke Law Journal, 2000). and "Hating the Law for Christian Reasons: The Religious Roots of American Antinomianism" (Jews and the Law, 2014). His 1998 Stanford Environmental Law Journal article on climate engineering and climate change, described as "seminal" by Salon.com was the first legal analysis of geoengineering in legal academic literature.

== Meditation and spirituality ==
Michaelson is an ordained rabbi, and teaches meditation in Buddhist, Jewish, and secular contexts. His books on meditation and spirituality include Evolving Dharma: Meditation, Buddhism, and the Next Generation of Enlightenment and Everything Is God: The Radical Path of Nondual Judaism. From 2018 to 2022, he was a teacher, editor and podcast host at Ten Percent Happier, a meditation app and podcast network. He is also a teacher of jhāna meditation in the Theravadan Buddhist lineage of Ayya Khema and Michaelson's teacher Leigh Brasington and co-leads Jewish meditation retreats at the Isabella Freedman Jewish Retreat Center.

== LGBTQ activism ==
Michaelson is a rabbi and openly gay. He was a professional religious LGBTQ activist from 2004 to 2013. He was the founder and executive director of Nehirim, an LGBTQ Jewish organization, from 2004 to 2013. His 2009 book God vs. Gay? The Religious Case for Equality was an Amazon bestseller and Lambda Literary Award finalist, and Michaelson spoke at over 100 places of worship during the 2009–2015 debates about same-sex marriage. Michaelson was called one of the "Most Inspiring LGBT Religious Leaders" in 2011 by HuffPost and one of "Our Religious Allies" by the LGBT newspaper The Advocate.

In 2014, Michaelson co-directed Quorum: Global LGBT Voices, a project at The Daily Beast that features TED-style talks by LGBT leaders from the Global South. Other LGBTQ-focused work includes the chapter on Exodus in the Queer Bible Commentary.

== Books ==
- God in Your Body: Kabbalah, Mindfulness and Embodied Spiritual Practice (2006)
- Another Word for Sky: Poems (2007)
- Everything is God: The Radical Path of Nondual Judaism (2009)
- God vs. Gay?: The Religious Case for Equality (2011)
- Evolving Dharma: Meditation, Buddhism, and the Next Generation of Enlightenment (2013)
- The Gate of Tears: Sadness and the Spiritual Path (2015)
- Is: Heretical Blessings and Poems (as Yaakov Moshe) (2017)
- Enlightenment by Trial and Error (2019)
- The Heresy of Jacob Frank: From Jewish Messianism to Esoteric Myth (2022)
- The Secret that is Not a Secret: Ten Heretical Tales (2023)
