= United States Supreme Court Building =

Federal building in Washington, D.C.

Supreme Court Building
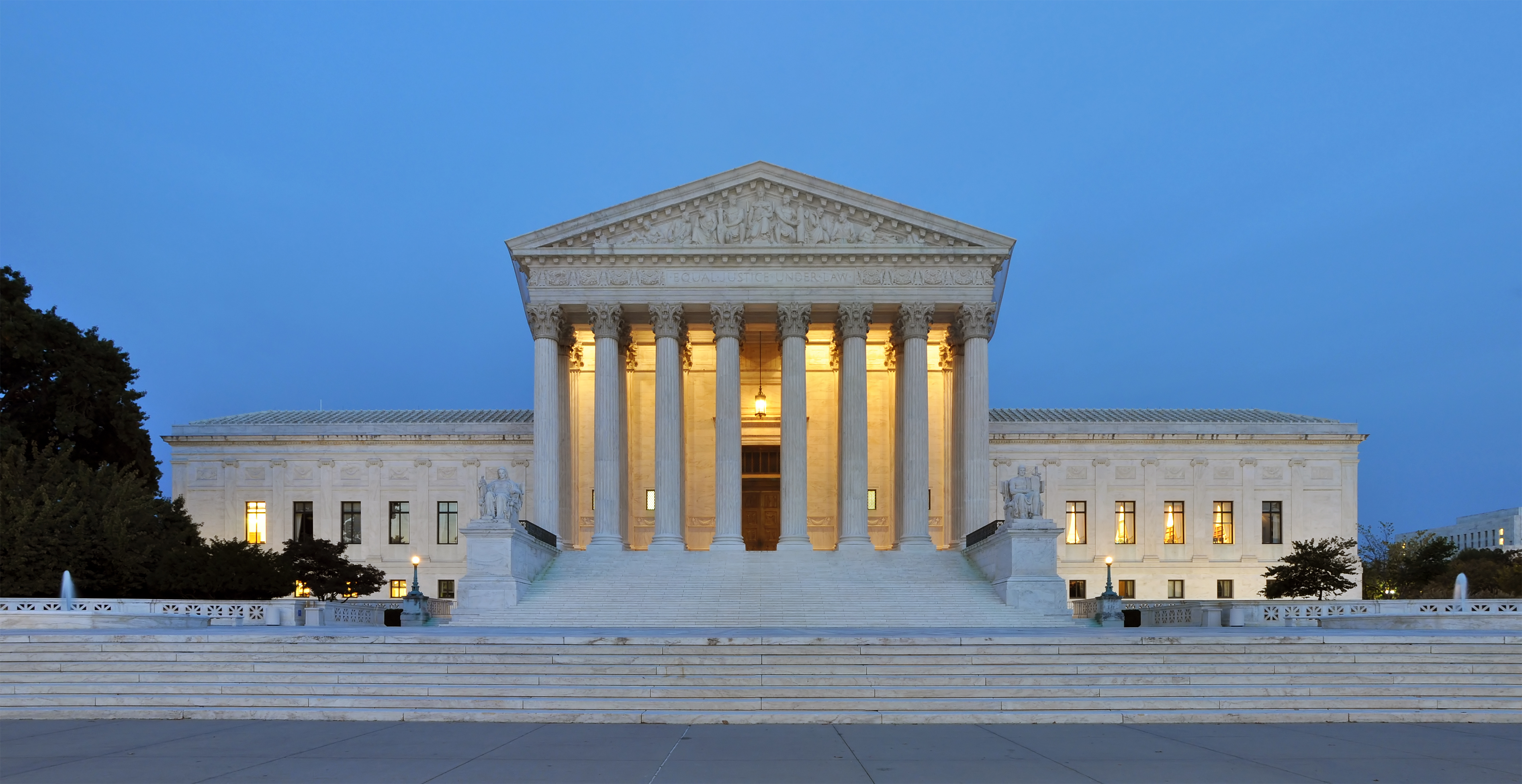
- West Facade of the U.S. Supreme Court Building in 2011

- Location within Central Washington, D.C. Location within the United States

General information
- Architectural style: Neoclassical
- Location: 1 First Street, Northeast Washington, D.C., U.S.
- Coordinates: 38°53′26″N 77°0′16″W
- Construction started: 1932; 94 years ago
- Completed: 1935; 91 years ago
- Owner: Federal government of the United States

Design and construction
- Architects: Cass Gilbert, Cass Gilbert Jr.

U.S. National Historic Landmark
- Designated: May 4, 1987

D.C. Inventory of Historic Sites
- Designated: November 8, 1964
- Reference no.: 579

The Supreme Court Building houses the Supreme Court of the United States, the highest court in the federal judiciary of the United States. The building serves as the official workplace of the chief justice of the United States and the eight associate justices of the Supreme Court. It is located at 1 First Street in Northeast Washington, D.C. It is one block immediately east of the United States Capitol and north of the Library of Congress. The building is managed by the Architect of the Capitol. On May 4, 1987, the Supreme Court Building was designated a National Historic Landmark.

Designed in the neoclassical style, the proposal for a separate building for the Supreme Court was suggested in 1912 by President William Howard Taft, who became Chief Justice in 1921. In 1929, Taft successfully argued for the creation of the new building but did not live to see it built. Physical construction began in 1932 and was completed in 1935 under the guidance of Chief Justice Charles Evans Hughes, Taft's successor. Architect Cass Gilbert, a friend of William Howard Taft, designed the building.

== History ==
=== 18th century ===
Before the establishment of Washington, D.C., as the national capital, the United States government was briefly based in New York City, where the Supreme Court met in the Merchants Exchange Building. When the capital moved to Philadelphia, the Court moved with it and began meeting in Independence Hall before settling in Old City Hall at 5th and Chestnut streets from 1791 until 1800.

=== 19th century ===
After the federal government moved to Washington, D.C., in 1800, the court had no permanent meeting location until 1810. When the architect Benjamin Henry Latrobe had the second U.S. Senate chamber built directly on top of the first U.S. Senate chamber, the Supreme Court took up residence in what is now referred to as the Old Supreme Court Chamber from 1810 through 1860. It remained in the U.S. Capitol until 1935, except for a period from 1814 to 1819, during which the Court was absent from the city following the 1814 burning of Washington by British forces during the War of 1812.

As the Senate expanded, it progressively outgrew its quarters. In 1860, after the new wings of the Capitol for the Senate and the House of Representatives had been completed, the Supreme Court moved to the Old Senate Chamber (as it is now known) where it remained until its move to the current Supreme Court building.

=== 20th century ===
From 1860 to 1935, the Supreme Court justices were designated to conduct their work within the cramped space of the Old Senate Chamber alongside other federal government employees. This environment discouraged the justices from traveling to Washington, so they conducted most of their work from their homes. Before the Supreme Court building was approved, Charles Evans Hughes, who had been an associate justice from 1910 to 1916, was vocally outspoken about the poor conditions of the justices' working environment and described the Old Senate Chamber as small, overheated, and barren.

President William Howard Taft proposed a new Supreme Court building in 1912. After becoming Chief Justice in 1921 he argued successfully for the Court to have its own headquarters to distance itself from Congress as an independent branch of government. Through the rigorous lobbying efforts of Chief Justice Taft, he was able to secure the funding needed from Congress for a Supreme Court building in 1929. Taft's motivations for a Supreme Court building were fueled by the relationship between the judicial branch and the other branches of government, as well as the drastic differences in his working environment from when he served as President of the United States to when he served as Chief Justice. Taft envisioned the judicial branch of government to embody a persona of independence, and therefore saw the Supreme Court building as a means of establishing his vision.

In 1929, the government purchased the National Woman's Party headquarters and razed it for a new building. The court building was designed by architect Cass Gilbert, who was a friend to Taft. The building was completed by his son Cass Gilbert Jr. following the elder Gilbert's death in 1934.

==== Opposition ====
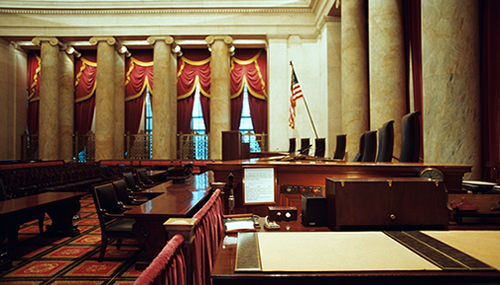
The interior of the U.S. Supreme Court Building

Chief Justice Edward Douglass White, nominated by Taft in 1910, and later succeeded by him in 1921, was part of the initial resistance to the idea of a Supreme Court building. He argued that the Supreme Court obtained its relevance because of its location within the Capitol. Many justices in addition to Chief Justice White refused to conduct their work within the building and remained in their homes. The familiarity of their workspaces at home naturally discouraged the justices from operating in a completely new location, and they were also given funding by Congress to work from their homes.

Justices Harlan Fiske Stone and Louis Brandeis did not move into the new Supreme Court Building during their service on the court. Brandeis believed that Taft's intentions behind the new building represented a conflict between the judicial branch and the executive and legislative branches of government. Brandeis also opposed Taft's efforts to secure a new Supreme Court building by suggesting that a new wing should be added to the capitol to avoid having to work from his home; however, Taft was relentless in pursuing his vision for the Supreme Court. A decade after the Supreme Court building was completed, all nine justices occupied an office within the structure. This is primarily because the justices that did not favor the new Supreme Court Building were eventually replaced by new justices who were unfamiliar with working from home.

The main opposition to the creation of the Supreme Court building was in Congress, particularly during Taft's tenure as Chief Justice. Taft faced opposition from senators in Congress, such as Senator Charles Curtis of Kansas, who threatened to replace Taft if he continued to protest his working conditions. In 1927, Taft noticed that out of ninety-six total senators at the time, only one urgently supported Taft's lobbying efforts; but only because this senator wanted the space the justices occupied at that time for the Senate.

== Building features ==
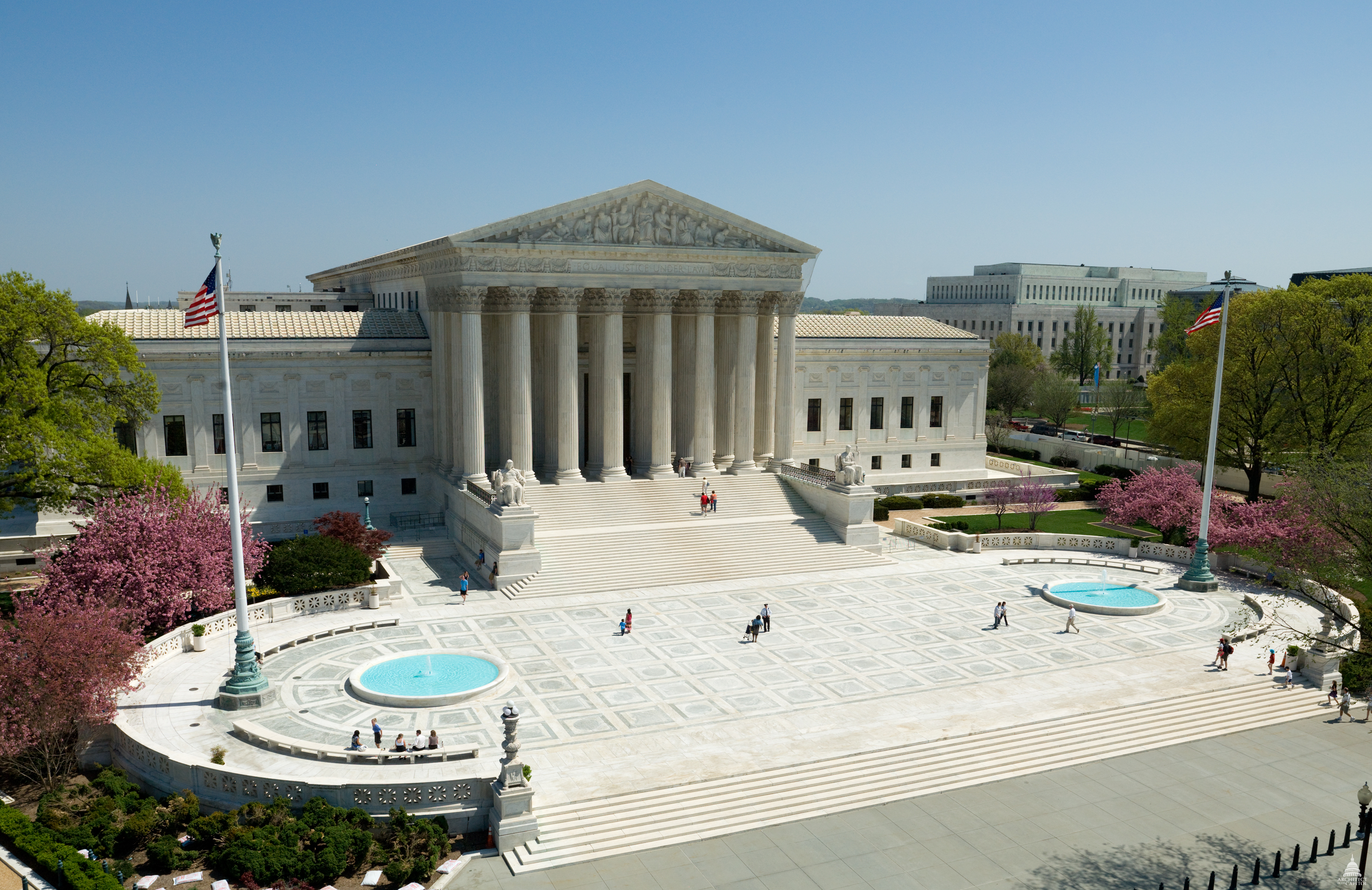
The west façade and plaza

The Supreme Court Building is located at 1 First Street, NE, on the site of the former Old Capitol Prison, across the street from the United States Capitol. The building was designed by architect Cass Gilbert, and was Gilbert's last major project; he died before it was completed. Gilbert was a long-time friend of William Howard Taft and was employed for several years by McKim, Mead, and White, then regarded as the largest architectural firm in the world. Chief Justice Taft personally appointed Gilbert for the architectural planning and construction of the Supreme Court building. Gilbert was not particularly concerned with the function of the Supreme Court building for the Supreme Court Justices; however, the respect Gilbert had for Chief Justice Taft compelled him to design the building as a testament to his friend's honor. Gilbert's architectural imagination resulted in a Greek-styled temple which was intended to communicate the inherent royalty of law.

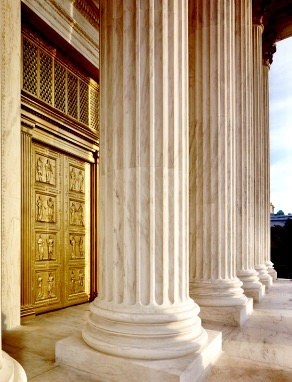
Entrance's ornate oversized bronze doors

The Supreme Court Building is in the Neoclassical style and rises four stories (92 ft (28 m)) above ground. The cornerstone was laid on October 13, 1932, and construction was completed in 1935 for slightly under the $9,740,000 budget authorized by Congress ($173 million in 2024 dollars). "The building was designed on a scale in keeping with the importance and dignity of the Court and the Judiciary as a coequal, independent branch of the United States Government, and as a symbol of 'the national ideal of justice in the highest sphere of activity.'" The public façade is made of marble quarried from Vermont, and that of the non-public-facing courtyards, Georgia marble. The massive, oversized bronze doors for the entrance were manufactured and cast by the General Bronze Corporation of New York City.

"Out of all of our monumental projects, spread over two lifetimes, the Supreme Court doors are the only work that we ever signed - that's how important they were."

— John Donnelly, Jr., Sculptor — US Supreme Court Info Sheet

Most of the interior spaces are lined with Alabama marble, except for the Courtroom itself, which is lined with Spanish ivory vein marble. For the Courtroom's 24 columns, "Gilbert felt that only the ivory buff and golden marble from the Montarrenti quarries near Siena, Italy" would suffice. In May 1933, he petitioned the Italian Prime Minister, Benito Mussolini, "to ask his assistance in guaranteeing that the Siena quarries sent nothing inferior to the official sample marble".

Not all the justices were thrilled by the new arrangements, the courtroom in particular. Harlan Fiske Stone complained it was "almost bombastically pretentious... Wholly inappropriate for a quiet group of old boys such as the Supreme Court". Another justice observed that he felt the court would be "nine black beetles in the Temple of Karnak", while another complained that such pomp and ceremony suggested the justices ought to enter the courtroom riding on elephants. The New Yorker columnist Howard Brubaker noted at the time of its opening that it had "fine big windows to throw the New Deal out of".

The west façade of the building bears the motto "Equal Justice Under Law", while the east façade bears the motto "Justice, the Guardian of Liberty". On November 28, 2005, a basketball-sized chunk of marble weighing approximately 172 lb (78 kg) fell four stories from the west façade onto the steps of the Court; it had previously been part of the parapet above the word "under" in the "Equal Justice Under Law" engraving immediately above the figure of a Roman centurion carrying fasces. After the incident, planning was initiated to repair the west façade, which included cleaning, removal of debris, and restoration. In 2012, scaffolding encased the west façade printed with a full-size photograph of the façade. The project was completed in 2013.

=== Floor by floor ===
The Supreme Court Building includes:

- The basement, which houses maintenance facilities, garage, and the on-site mailroom
- The first floor, which includes the public information office, the clerk's office, the publications unit, exhibit halls, the cafeteria, the gift shop, and administrative offices
- The second floor, which includes the Great Hall, the courtroom, the conference room, and all of the justices' chambers except Justice Sotomayor.
- The third floor includes the office of Justice Sotomayor, the office of the Reporter of Decisions, the legal office, the offices of the law clerk, and the justices' dining room and reference library
- The fourth floor includes the U.S. Supreme Court Library
- The fifth floor includes the U.S. Supreme Court gym, which includes a basketball court named the "Highest Court in the Land".

Originally built as a storage area, the gym was converted for its current function in the 1940s, although who is responsible for the transformation is not known. It may have been built at the suggestion of Cass Gilbert Jr., who took over many of his father's projects after he died. Among the justices known for their on-court prowess was Justice Byron White who, as the runner-up for the 1937 Heisman Trophy and former National Football League player, is considered to be the Supreme Court's preeminent sportsman. Supreme Court clerks who have played include Fox News commentator Laura Ingraham, and current Supreme Court Justices Elena Kagan and Brett Kavanaugh. Near the entrance to the gym is a sign that reads: "Playing basketball and weightlifting are prohibited while the court is in session". The Atlantic Terra Cotta Company of Perth Amboy, New Jersey created the terra cotta roof for the building. The Supreme Court Building maintains its own police force, the Supreme Court Police. Separate from the Capitol Police, the force was created in 1935 to protect the building and its personnel.

== Sculptural program ==
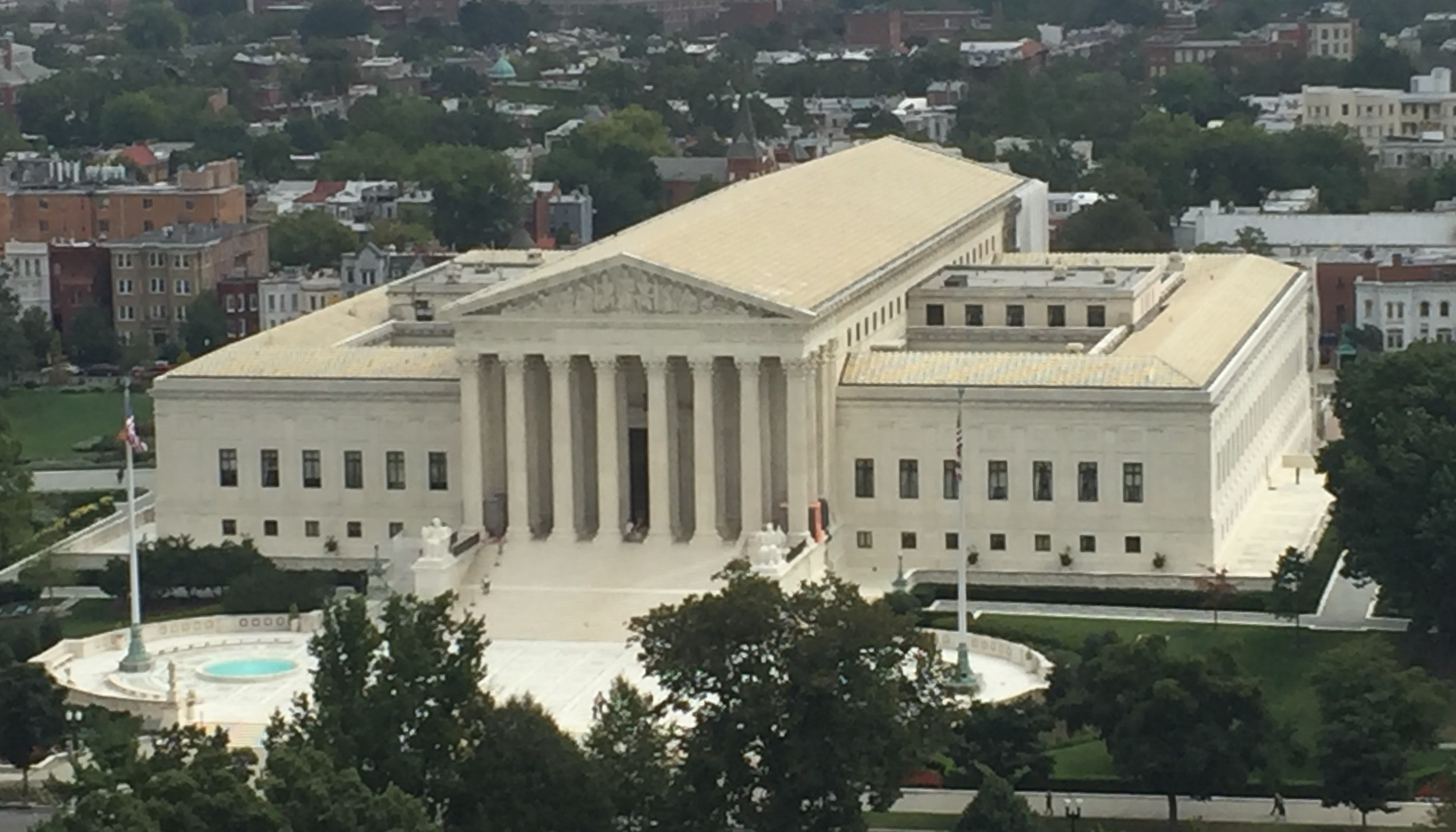
The U.S. Supreme Court Building seen from United States Capitol rotunda

- Cass Gilbert's design for the building and its environs featured an ambitious Beaux-Arts-styled sculptural program including a large number and variety of both real and allegorical figures
- Supreme Court flagpole bases, and oversized bronze doors in the east and west façades, measure 17 feet high, 9 ½ feet wide, and weigh 13 tons. The doors were designed by Gilbert and John Donnelly Sr. (1867–1947) and sculpted by his son, John Donnelly Jr. (1903–1970). Each door consists of four bas-reliefs illustrating events in the evolution of western justice. Cast by the General Bronze Corporation of Long Island City, New York, they were shipped to Washington and installed in early 1935.
- East pediment: Justice, the Guardian of Liberty by Hermon Atkins MacNeil
- West pediment: Equal Justice Under Law by Robert Ingersoll Aitken. This work includes a portrait of Cass Gilbert, third from the left in the pediment. It also contains a self-portrait of Robert Ingersoll Aitken third from the right.
- Statues: The Authority of Law (south side) and The Contemplation of Justice (north side) by James Earle Fraser, which is based on the Roman goddess Justitia.
- Great Hall: Busts of each of the Chief Justices of the United States in alcoves on either side of the Hall. These marble works are periodically appropriated by the Congress. The most recent addition was Chief Justice William Rehnquist's bust in December 2009 to the far end of the north side of the Hall, just to the left of the Courtroom doors.
- Courtroom friezes: The South Wall Frieze includes figures of lawgivers from the ancient world and includes Menes, Hammurabi, Moses, Solomon, Lycurgus, Solon, Draco, Confucius, and Augustus. The North Wall Frieze shows lawgivers from the Middle Ages on and includes representations of Justinian, Muhammad, Charlemagne, John, King of England, Louis IX of France, Hugo Grotius, Sir William Blackstone, John Marshall, and Napoleon. The Moses frieze depicts him holding the Ten Commandments. In 1997, the Council on American-Islamic Relations (CAIR) asked for the image of Muhammad to be removed from the marble frieze of the façade. While appreciating that Muhammad was included in the court's pantheon of 18 prominent lawgivers of history, CAIR noted that Islam discourages depictions of Muhammad in any artistic representation. CAIR also objected that Muhammad was shown with a sword, which they claimed reinforced stereotypes of Muslims as intolerant conquerors. Chief Justice William Rehnquist rejected the request to sandblast Muhammad, saying the artwork "was intended only to recognize him, among many other lawgivers, as an important figure in the history of law; it is not intended as a form of idol worship". The court later added a footnote to tourist materials, calling it "a well-intentioned attempt by the sculptor to honor Muhammad".
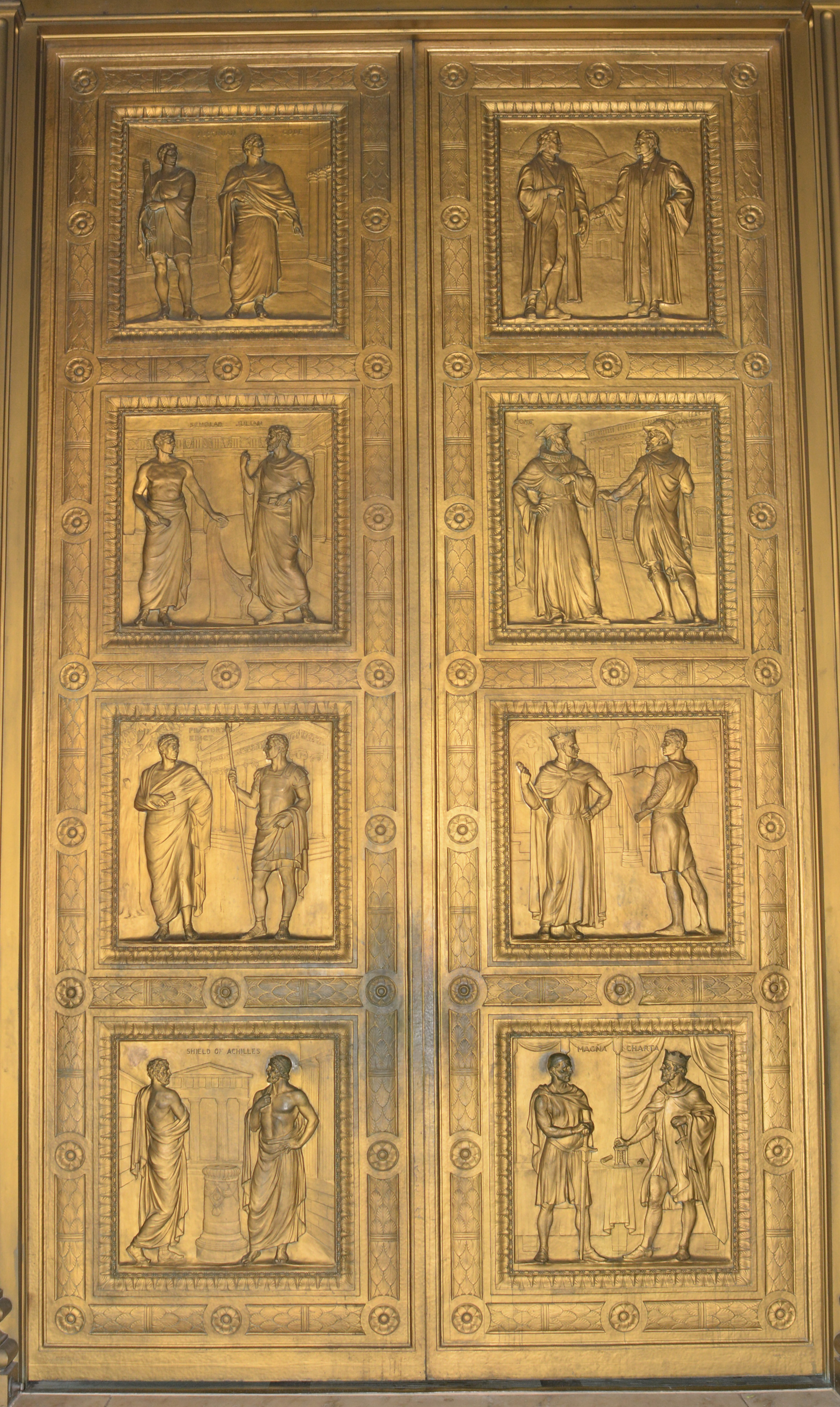
Visitors enter through pocket doors made by the General Bronze Corporation and must arrive before business hours to view. They are rolled into wall recesses each morning as the building opens.

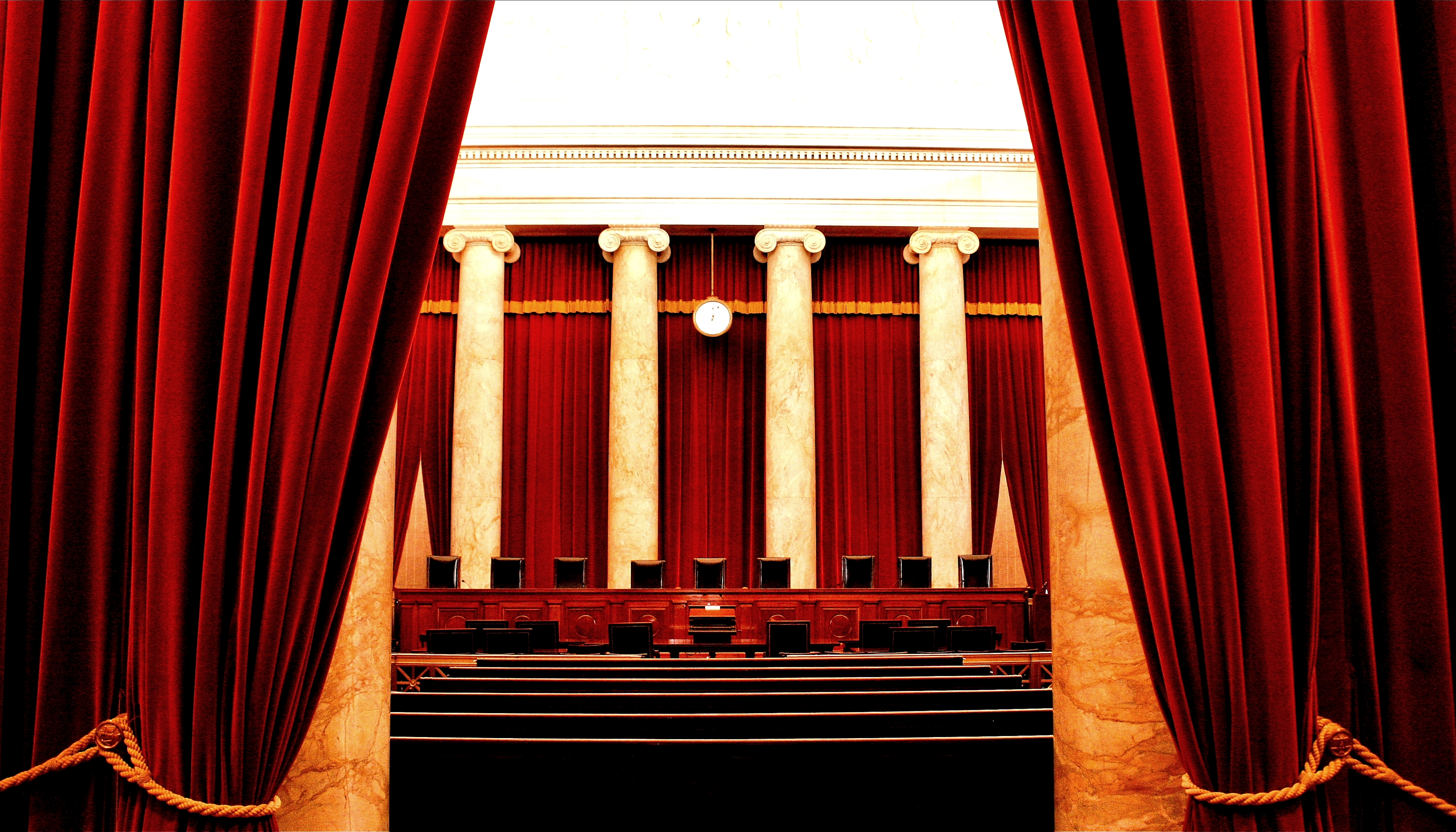
The Supreme Court courtroom interior with its Siena marble

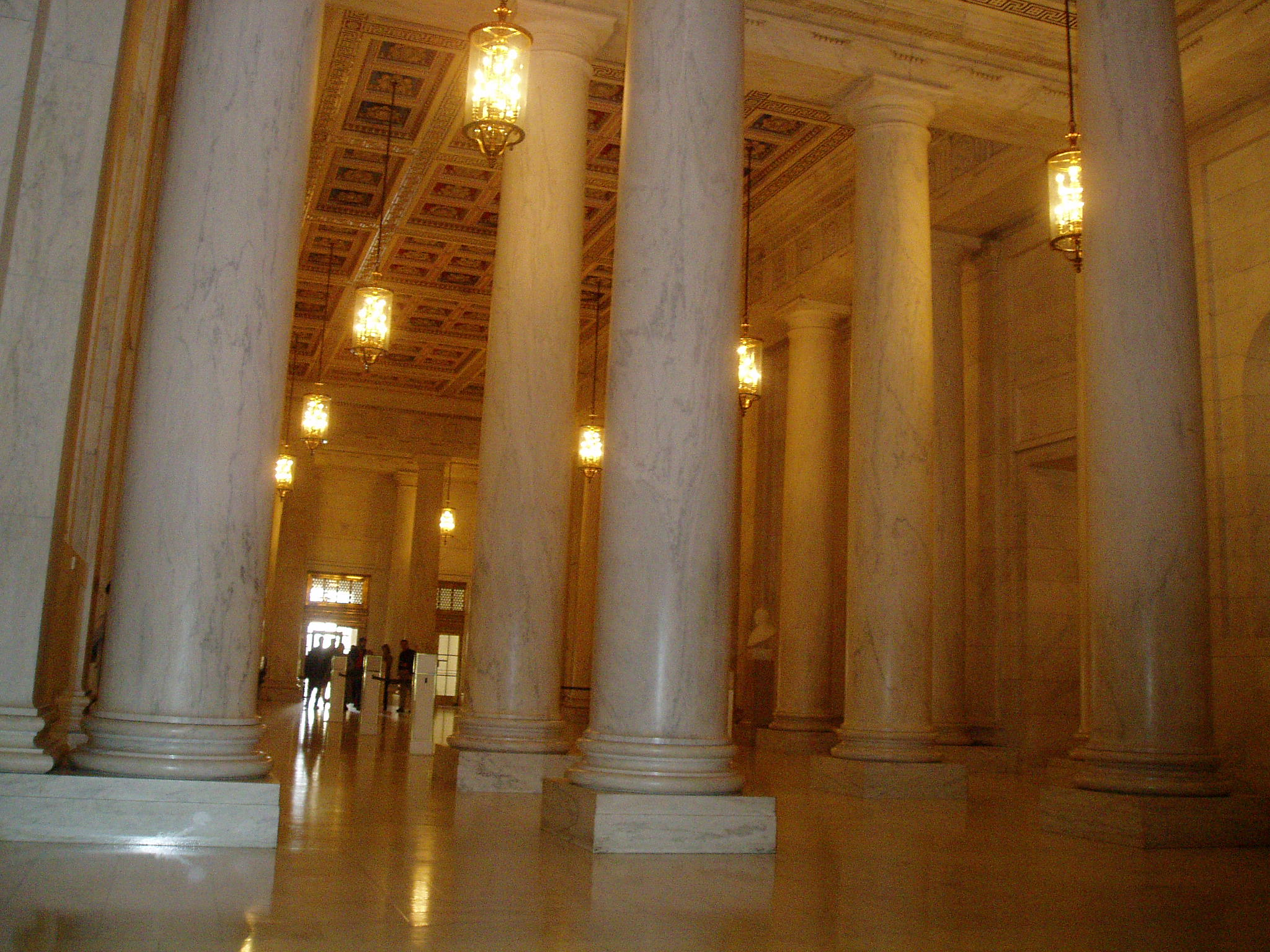
View of the Alabama marble in the hallway

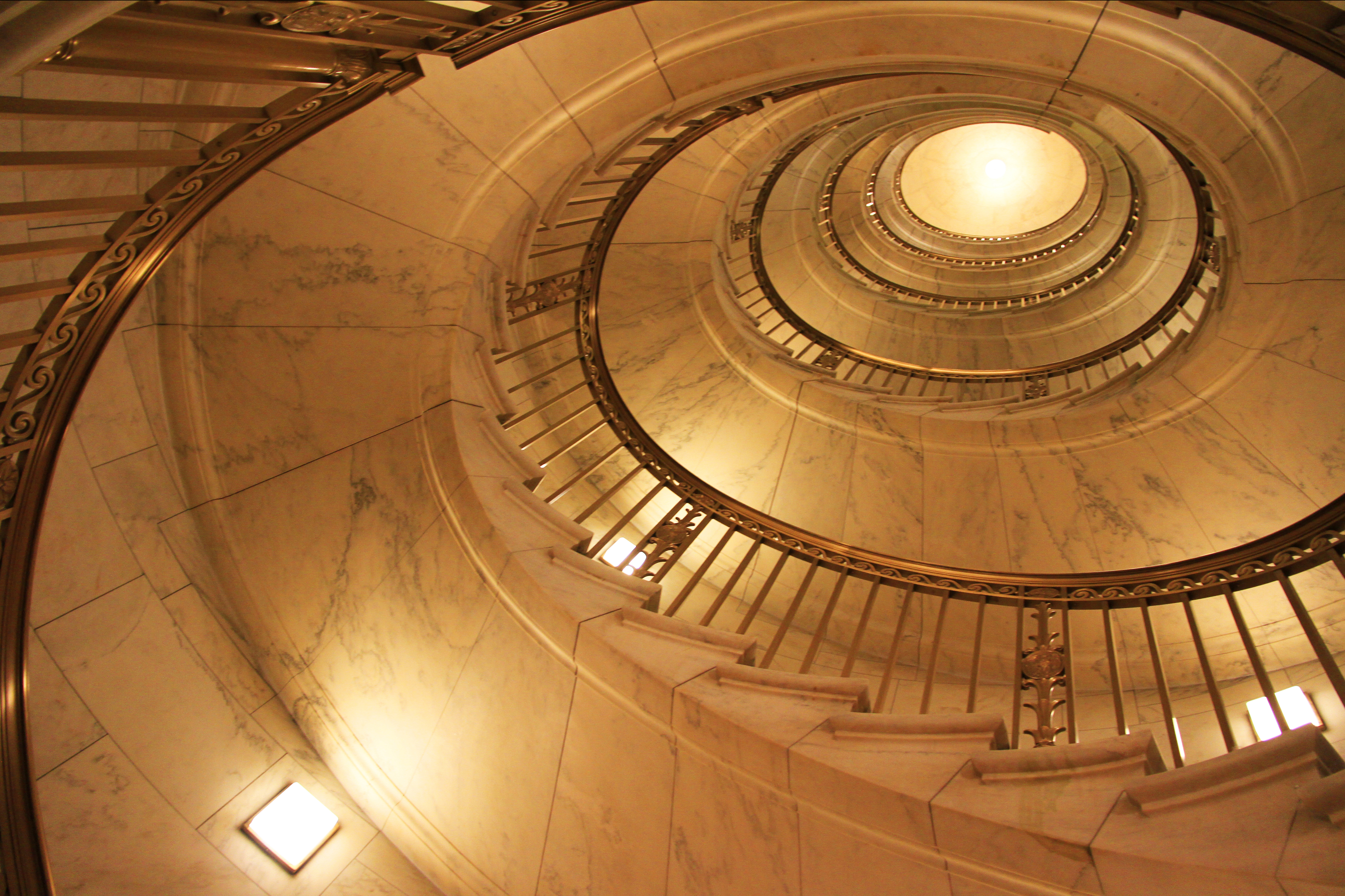
One of two self-supporting spiral staircases in Alabama marble

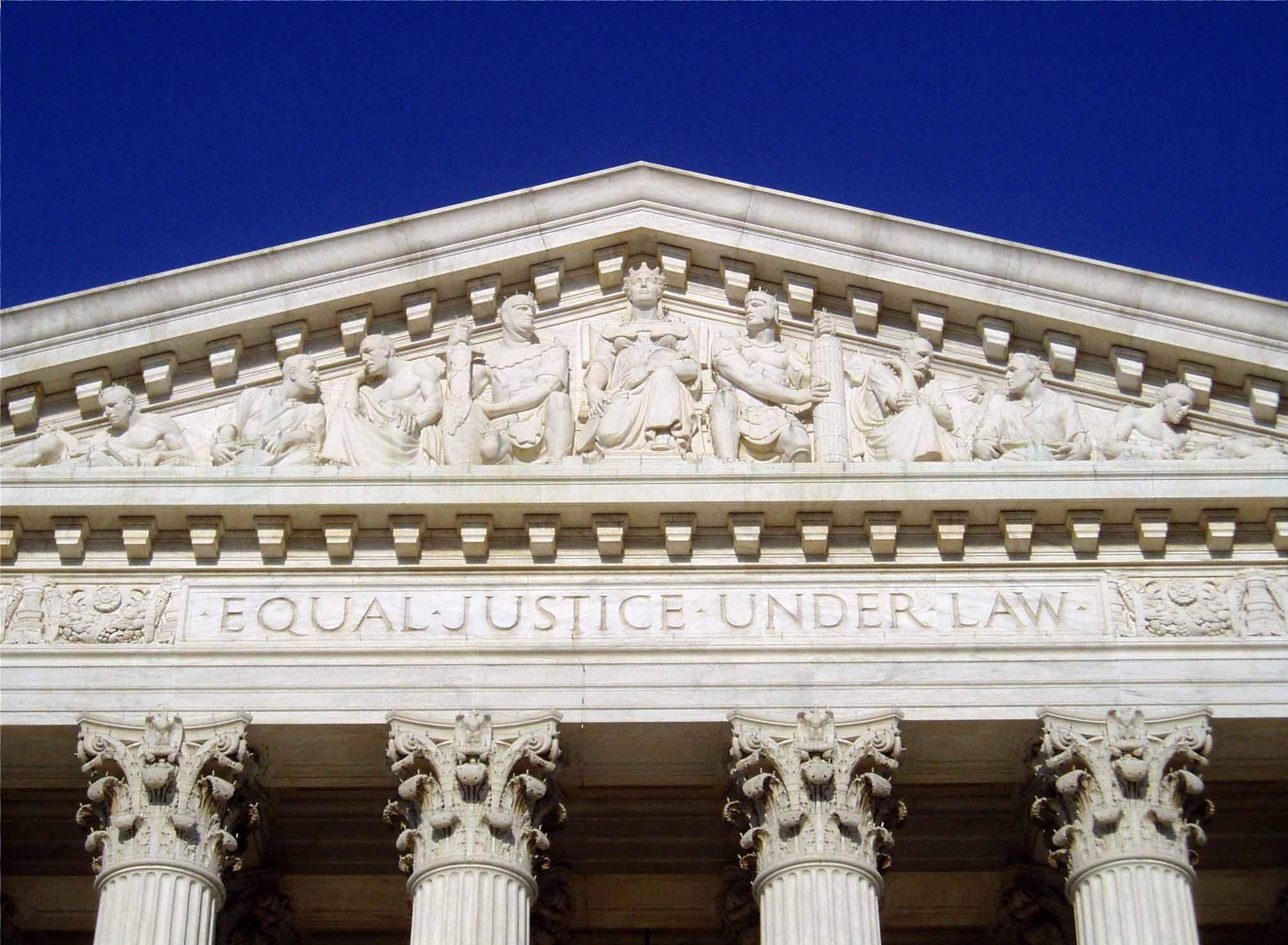
Equal Justice Under Law, by Robert Ingersoll Aitken, over the western façade

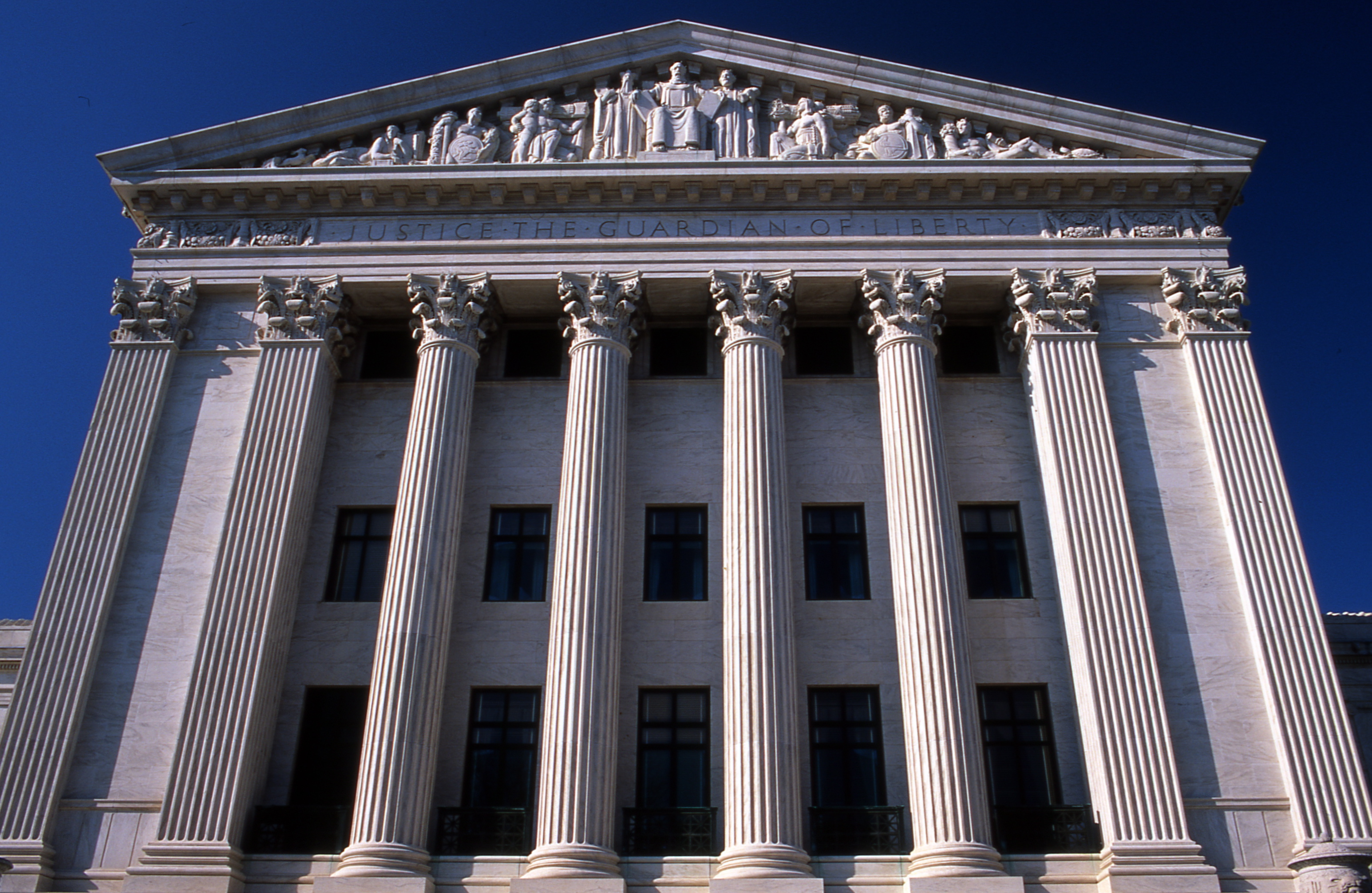
Justice the Guardian of Liberty, by Hermon Atkins MacNeil, over the eastern façade

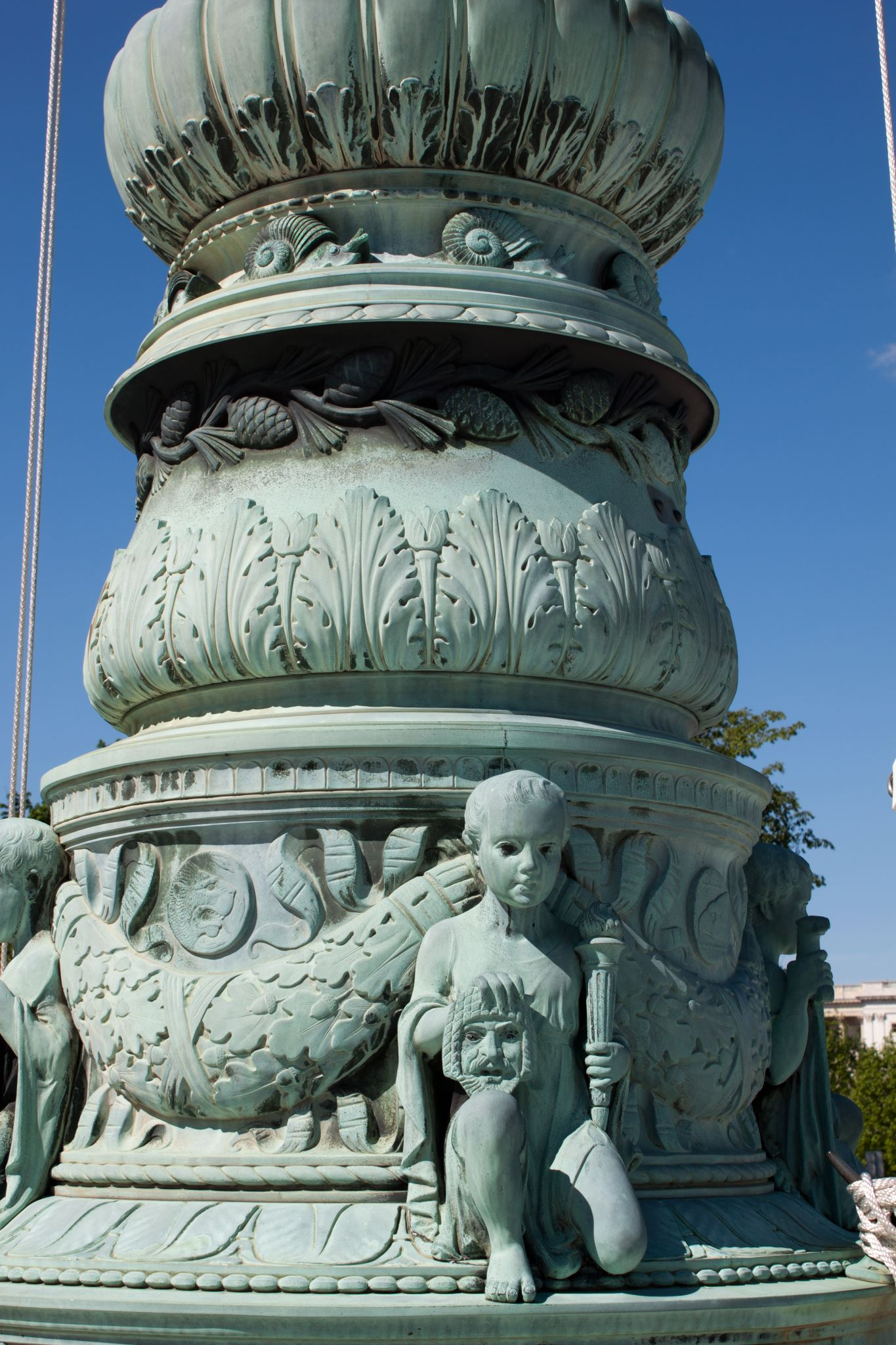
Ornate flagpole base by General Bronze

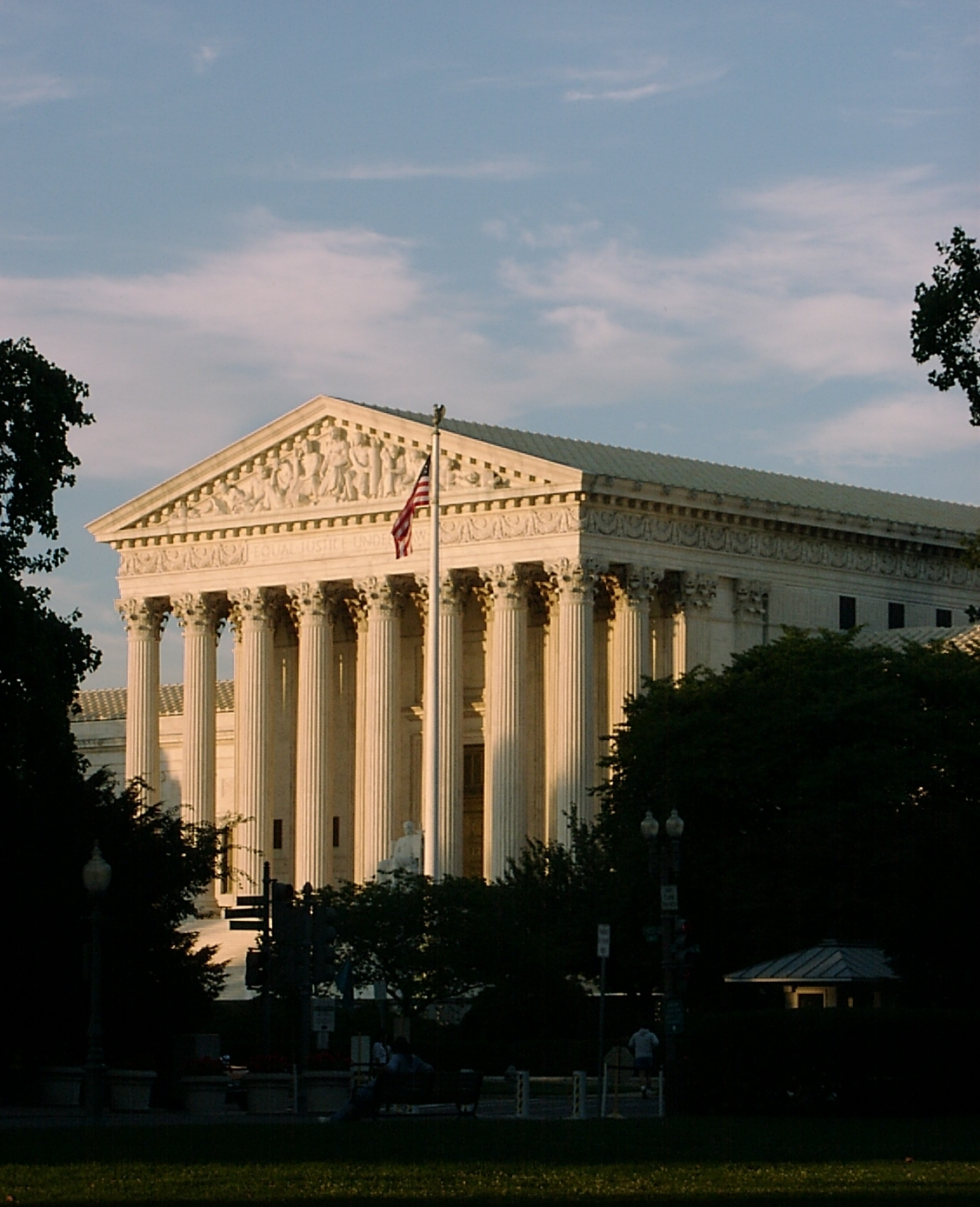
Oblique view with flagpole

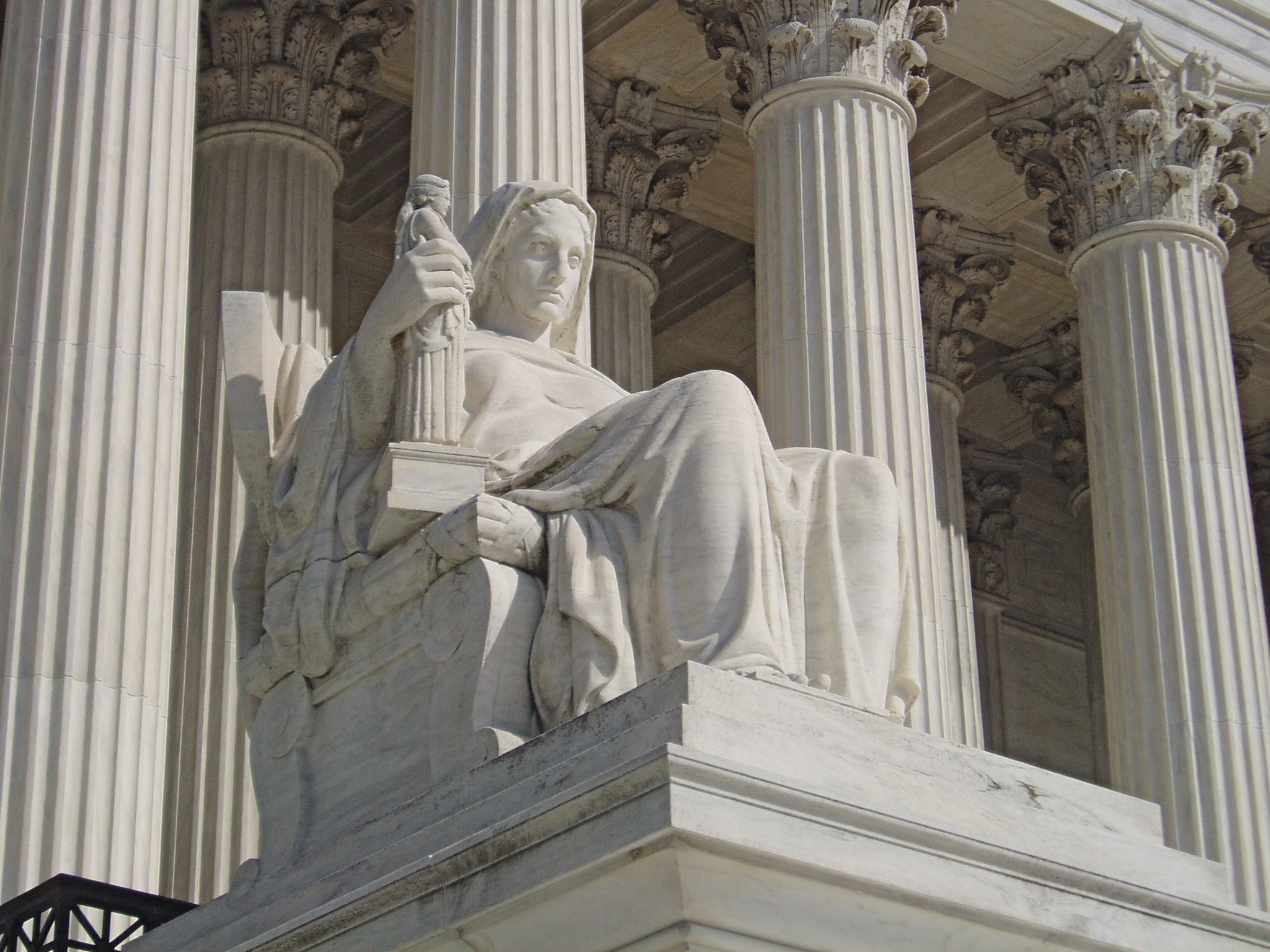
The Contemplation of Justice statue by James Earle Fraser

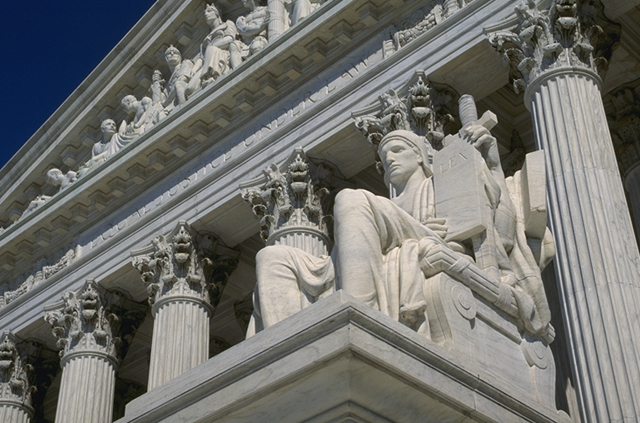
The Authority of Law statue by Fraser

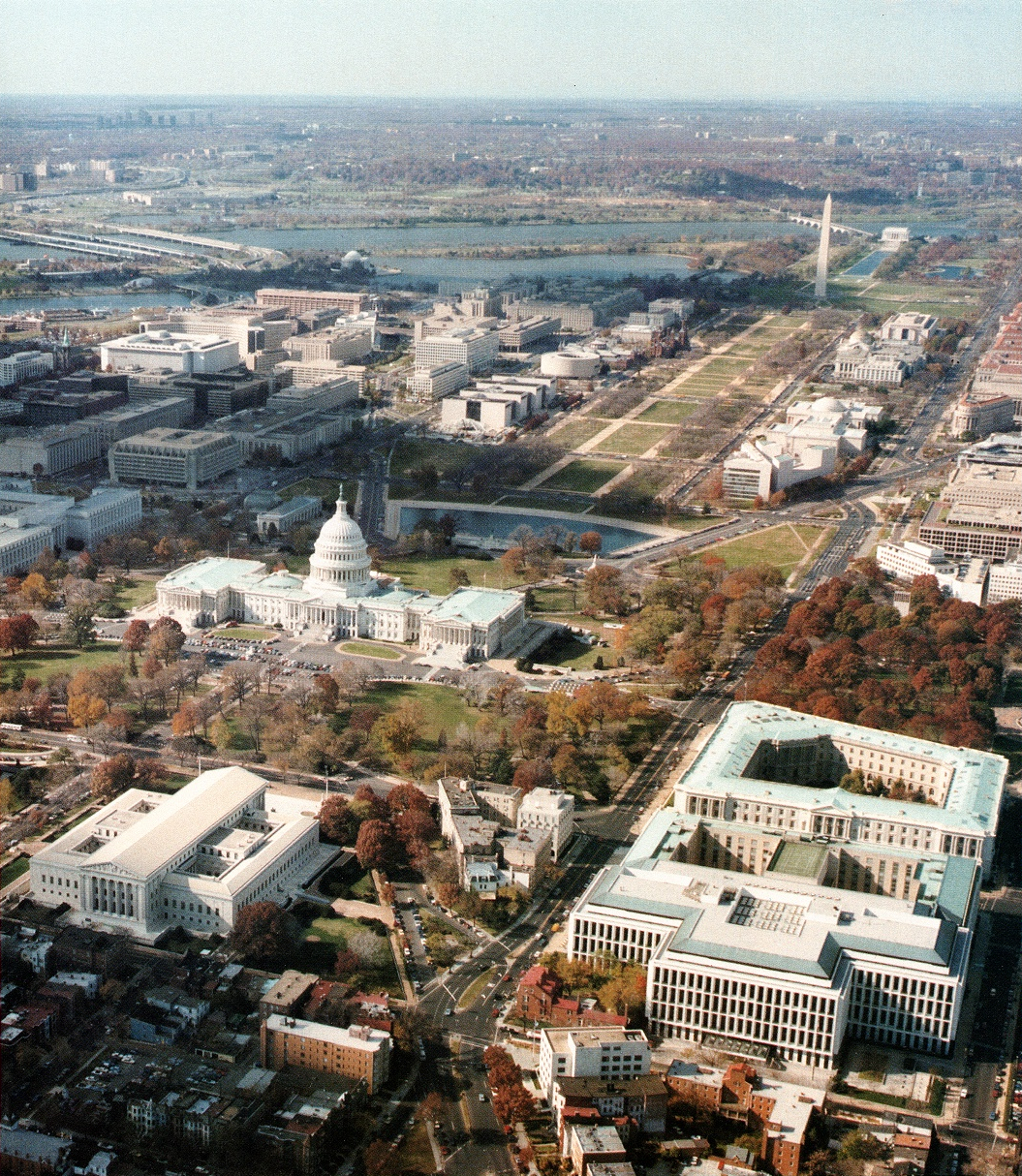
Aerial view of Washington D.C., showing position of the courthouse (lower left) relative to the Capitol building

== Public access ==
On May 3, 2010, citing security concerns and as part of the building's modernization project, the Supreme Court announced that the public (including parties to the cases being argued, the attorneys who represent them, and visitors to Oral arguments or the building) would no longer be allowed to enter the building through the main door on top of the steps on the west side. Visitors must now enter through ground-level doors located at the plaza, leading to a reinforced area for security screening. The main doors at the top of the steps may still be used to exit the building. Justice Breyer released a statement, joined by Justice Ginsburg, expressing his opinion that although he recognizes the security concerns that led to the decision, he does not believe on balance that the closure is justified. Calling the decision "dispiriting", he said he was not aware of any Supreme Court in the world that had closed its main entrance to the public.

All visitors to the Court must pass through metal detectors and have their belongings X-rayed. Cameras are permitted in the building, but no recording devices of any kind, audio or visual, are ever permitted in the Courtroom. When the Court is not in session, visitors can walk through the Great Hall and public areas on the ground floor, including the cafeteria and a small movie theater presenting a documentary of the Court, and guided lectures are periodically given in the Courtroom, which is not otherwise accessible. The schedule for the lectures can be confirmed on the Court's website the day before a visit. The line for these tours forms in a designated area to the side of the Courtroom doors.

When the Court is in session, the Great Hall is not open to the public, except for those attending Court. The arguments are typically held in two-week cycles of a 10 am and 11 am argument on Mondays, Tuesdays, and Wednesdays. Depending on the significance of the case and the time of year (winter arguments are less popular), visitors should arrive at the Court anywhere from two hours in advance to, in extremely controversial cases, the night before. At some point in the morning, which is not predetermined, the Supreme Court Police Officers distribute numbered tickets. These serve as placeholders only and are not a guarantee of admission. Visitors who have tickets may leave the area and return at the appointed time to line up in numerical order, usually one hour before the argument. At this time, there usually are several hundred persons waiting outside the Court, most of whom are not able to observe either argument. The Courtroom has seating for some 250 public visitors, but there are almost always large groups of students or officials that reduce the number of available seats. Visitors who are admitted to observe the first argument generally stay for the second argument, resulting in only a small number of total seats available for the second argument. Just before the first argument, the officers divide the crowd into two lines: one is for those waiting with tickets to observe the entire argument, while the other is to observe five minutes of the argument while standing in the back of the Courtroom. Both lines remain in place during the first argument. Visitors must stand when the justices enter and leave, and remain silent. Drowsy, noisy, or otherwise disruptive visitors are promptly removed by plainclothes officers.

Since recording devices have been banned inside the courtroom, the fastest way for decisions of landmark cases to reach the press is through the Running of the Interns.

== See also ==
- List of National Historic Landmarks in the District of Columbia
- Lying in repose – as an honor for deceased Supreme Court Justices, they can "lie in repose" in the Great Hall of the United States Supreme Court Building
- Architecture of Washington, D.C.
