= Janet Weinberg =

American LGBTQ, HIV/AIDS and disability activist (1955–2018)

- Born: April 3, 1955; Manhattan, New York, USA
- Died: September 1, 2018 (aged 63)
- Education: York College CUNY
- Known for: LGBTQ activism
- Spouse: Roz Richter (m. 2011)

Janet Inez Weinberg (April 3, 1955 – September 1, 2018) was an American LGBTQ activist, advocate for people with HIV/AIDS and advocate for disability rights, based in New York City. She was a fund-raiser and executive for social service organizations including Gay Men's Health Crisis (GMHC), Educational Alliance, and the Lesbian, Gay, Bisexual and Transgender Community Services Center.

Weinberg in her later years helped on major projects to mark LGBTQ history in the United States including the Stonewall National Monument, the nation's first monument of LGBT rights and history, the New York City AIDS Memorial, and an effort to create the first national LGBTQ museum.

== Early life and education ==
Janet Inez Weinberg was born in Manhattan April 3, 1955, to Esther Hariton Weinberg and father Herbert. She grew up in Highland Park, New Jersey, her mother Esther, a homemaker, died when Janet was three. Herbert, a stockbroker, remarried to a woman named May, Janet has a brother Kenneth who is now a doctor.

Janet attended Hofstra University in Hempstead, New York, and graduated from York College, City University of New York with an occupational therapy degree.

== Career ==
Weinberg started working at VTA Management Services (VTA), which provides contract rehabilitation therapy services in New York State, as an occupational therapist (OT) staff member. She mainly took care of children with “learning disabilities, traumatic injuries and neuromuscular diseases”. Over a decade she rose to a role overseeing “the work of more than 1,000 other therapists”, and earned a reputation for her activism on behalf of people with HIV and disabilities. She was made vice-president in 1998 of VTA's parent company, Symphony Health Services. Years later she still remembered a 1985 incident in Rockaway Beach, Queens when the local community “erupted” in anger to shut down a proposal to house homeless dying AIDS patients in a nursing home instead of hospitals. “They were never allowed to enter the nursing home,” she said, the city leaders bowed to “homophobia and hatred.” She also witnessed homophobia from medical staff firsthand in the 1980s during the height of the AIDS pandemic, although not HIV positive herself, she was an inpatient and the hospital staff refused to come into her room because she was lesbian. She became disabled herself in the 1980s due to an illness, and from then required a wheelchair.

In the mid-1990s, while still working at VTA, she was hired to the board of the Lesbian, Gay, Bisexual, and Transgender Community Center (The center). The center had made an offer, and she was looking for a transition to work serving “a population still affected by the AIDS epidemic”. She worked for many years at The center as its development director. At The center, she also was co-chairwomen helping lead a $14 million fundraising renovating its Greenwich Village headquarters. She was disabled and in a wheelchair, and utilized her experience to effect design changes as well as the organizations scope.

=== 2000s ===
In 2005 she joined Gay Men's Health Crisis (GMHC), an AIDS service organization, becoming Senior Managing Director of Development and Legislative Funding (from 2005 to 2009), and then becoming Chief Operations Officer (COO), and briefly as Chief Executive Officer until she left in 2014. At GMHC she an advocate for people with HIV/AIDS and disabilities. She also led programs assisting the agencies’ thousands of clients with General Equivalency Degree diplomas, financial planning, and immigrant issues. As the Senior Managing Director of Development and Legislative Funding her duties included public and private fundraising. Her work there included organizing for AIDS Walk New York, the largest single-day AIDS fundraiser in the world, in 2008 they had 45,000 participants raising $7.4 million. Weinberg secured GMHC's “first-ever federal appropriation” to mitigate crystal meth use among clients, total federal funding for that effort over time amounted to $1.8 million as of September 2018. She expanded the organization's mental health and substance abuse programs resulting in the clinic being opened in 2017. As COO she helped “secure over $10.8 million in new grants to expand GMHC's core services”.

In 2012 she was diagnosed with breast cancer, “relatively early, stage IIB, during a routine mammogram screening” which she said many lesbians don't get due to heteronormativity and homophobia, that after treatments and surgery went into remission. At a memorial, Urvashi Vaid, who formerly led the National LGBTQ Task Force, talked about “the Breasties,” a breast cancer support group, “We hated the color pink and loved saying ‘fuck cancer.’” From her experience with breast cancer and talking with other lesbians who avoided healthcare for the same bias against them concerns, she became a “fierce breast cancer screening advocate“.

She intended to retire after her work with GMHC but took on consulting work for Educational Alliance (EA) “whose community centers serve 50,000 residents of the Lower East Side and the East Village”. Her last job, from 2014 to 2018, was as executive vice-president at EA, a Jewish legacy organization started in the 1880s that provides multi-generational programs and services in education, health and wellness, arts and culture, and civic engagement across fifteen sites and a network of five community centers. She first worked for the organization as a consultant, then was hired as Executive Vice President for Programs and Operations. One of her biggest tasks was to oversee construction of a center for addiction services and recovery, EA had a large hole in the ground for ten years. Alan van Cappelle, EA's president, said, “Fill the hole and build the center. She lived it and breathed it,” with the center opening in 2016.

=== Later years ===
In later years she was part of major projects to mark LGBTQ history in the United States including the effort to create the Stonewall National Monument, the nation's first monument of LGBT rights and history, designated by President Barack Obama in June 2016. She also served on the board of the New York City AIDS Memorial, which honors the city's 100,000 citizens who died of AIDS, their carers and activists, that was opened on World AIDS Day on December 1, 2016. She was also central in an effort to create the first national LGBTQ museum.

Weinberg received “numerous awards from the NYC Board of Education, local political clubs, and professional organizations honoring her many years of service in the nonprofit sector”.

She died on September 1, 2018, from a chronic heart condition at 63 years old.

In June 2019, Weinberg was one of the inaugural fifty American “pioneers, trailblazers, and heroes” inducted on the National LGBTQ Wall of Honor within the Stonewall National Monument (SNM) in New York City's Stonewall Inn. The SNM is the first U.S. national monument dedicated to LGBTQ rights and history, while The Wall's unveiling was timed to take place during the 50th anniversary of the Stonewall riots.

== Personal life ==
Weinberg was Jewish; she joined Congregation Beit Simchat Torah, the world's largest LGBTQ synagogue in 1992.

In August 2011 Weinberg married her longtime partner Roz Richter, an associate justice on the New York State Appellate Division's First Branch bench in Manhattan, two months after same-sex marriage in New York was legalized.
