= 130 West 30th Street =

Residential condominium in Manhattan, New York

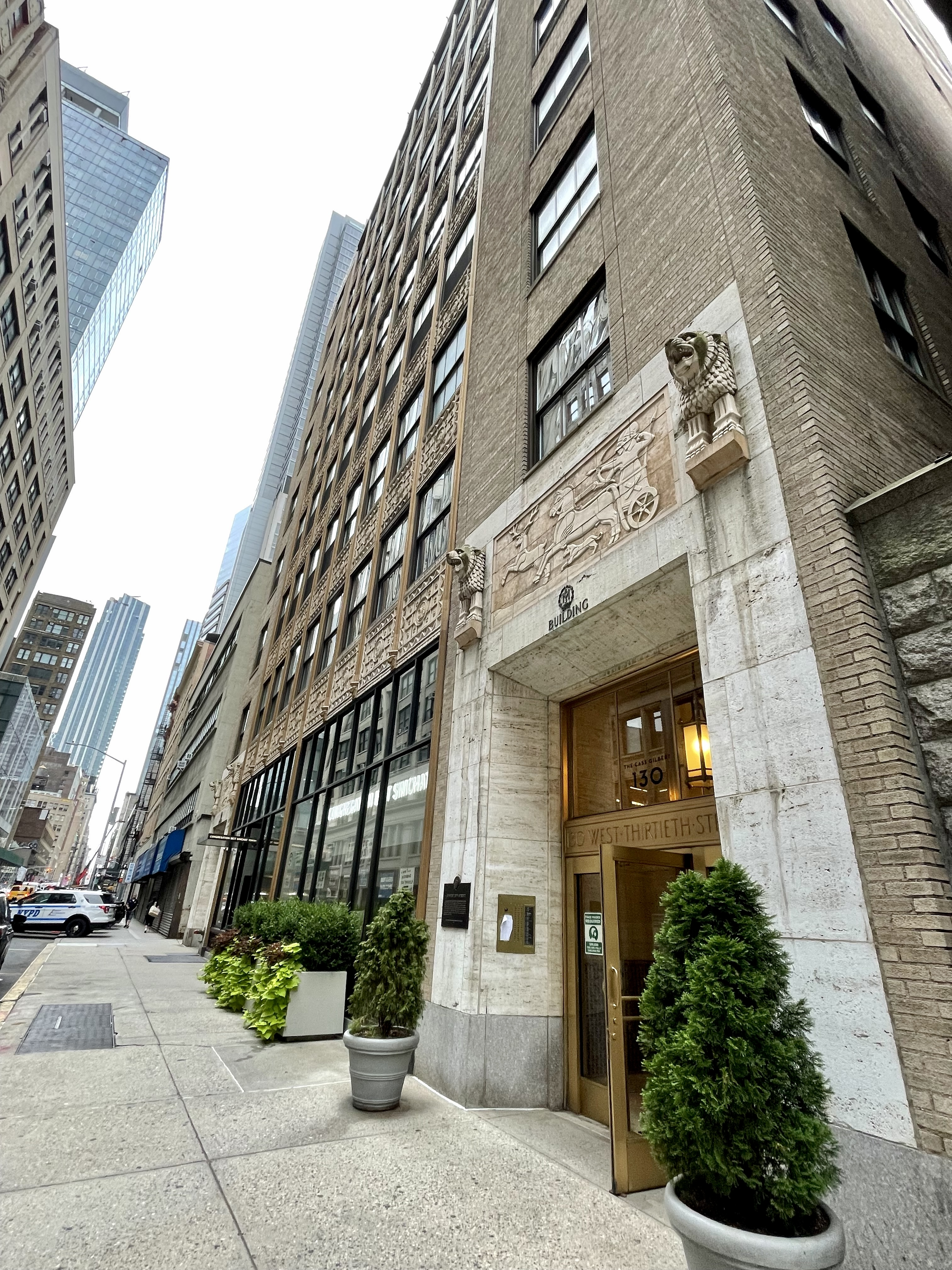
- Interactive map of the 130 West 30th Street area

General information
- Type: Commercial (1927–2003); Residential (2003–present)
- Architectural style: Assyrian Revival
- Location: 130 West 30th Street, Midtown Manhattan, New York City, United States
- Coordinates: 40°44′52″N 73°59′28″W
- Opened: 1928
- Client: Salomon J. Manne

Technical details
- Material: Brick; terracotta; marble
- Floor count: 18

Design and construction
- Architect: Cass Gilbert (1927)

New York City Landmark
- Official name: 130 West 30th Street Building
- Type: Building
- Designated: November 13, 2001

130 West 30th Street, also known as The Cass Gilbert, is a luxury condominium on 30th Street between the Avenue of the Americas (Sixth Avenue) and Seventh Avenue in Midtown Manhattan in New York City. The 18-story building was designed by Cass Gilbert in the Assyrian Revival style as offices, showrooms and manufacturing space in the Garment District. The building is a New York City designated landmark.

The facade is largely clad with brick and includes architectural terracotta friezes and bands. The building's design includes elements inspired by Middle Eastern architecture, such as ziggurats, and also contains setbacks as required by the 1916 Zoning Resolution. At ground level are two entrances recessed within travertine marble doorways, as well as a glass storefront. The lowest three stories house a synagogue for Congregation Beit Simchat Torah, which includes a lobby; a double-height sanctuary; and a basement with a community hall, classrooms, and chapel. The upper stories are divided into 45 condominiums.

The 130 West 30th Street Corporation signed a lease for the plot at 130 West 30th Street in March 1927. The broker, M. & L. Hess, hired Gilbert to design the building, which was finished in 1928. The building was originally known as the S.J.M Building, named for a fur trader, Salomon J. Manne. The building was sold in 1980 to engineering firm Lehr Associates for $1 million (equivalent to $4 million in 2025) and was gradually converted into office space. Henry Justin acquired the building in 2000. It was renamed The Cass Gilbert, after its architect, after being converted into residential condominiums in 2003. Beit Simchat Torah bought the basement, ground floor, and mezzanine in 2011 and renovated the space extensively, moving to the building in 2016.

== Site ==
130 West 30th Street is in the Garment District of Midtown Manhattan in New York City, between the Avenue of the Americas (Sixth Avenue) and Seventh Avenue. The building was originally bounded by two low-rise buildings. To the east was the Needle Trades Continuing School, while to the west was the New York City Police Department's 23rd Precinct station house (now the Traffic Control Division).

== Architecture ==
130 West 30th Street was designed in the Assyrian Revival style by Cass Gilbert, who had previously designed the Alexander Hamilton U.S. Custom House and the Woolworth Building. It is one of three buildings in New York City with Assyrian details; the other two, the Fred F. French Building and Graybar Building, have Assyrian motifs only on their respective roofs. Gilbert did not say why he had chosen to design the building with Assyrian Revival motifs, although he said: "I find beauty in so many different things that I like to develop a ziggurat in the style which seems best adapted to the purpose." The structure is 18 stories high in total.

Atlantic Terra Cotta made the architectural terracotta on the building. The building's design includes elements inspired by Middle Eastern architecture, such as ziggurats. There are setbacks above the 10th, 14th, and 17th stories, each of which are highlighted with two-colored terracotta friezes. These setbacks were required by the 1916 Zoning Resolution. The architectural historian Christopher Gray wrote of the building in 2004: "The ornamental program of Assyrian reliefs in polychrome terra cotta makes it one of the brightest spots in the area."

=== Form and facade ===
==== Base ====
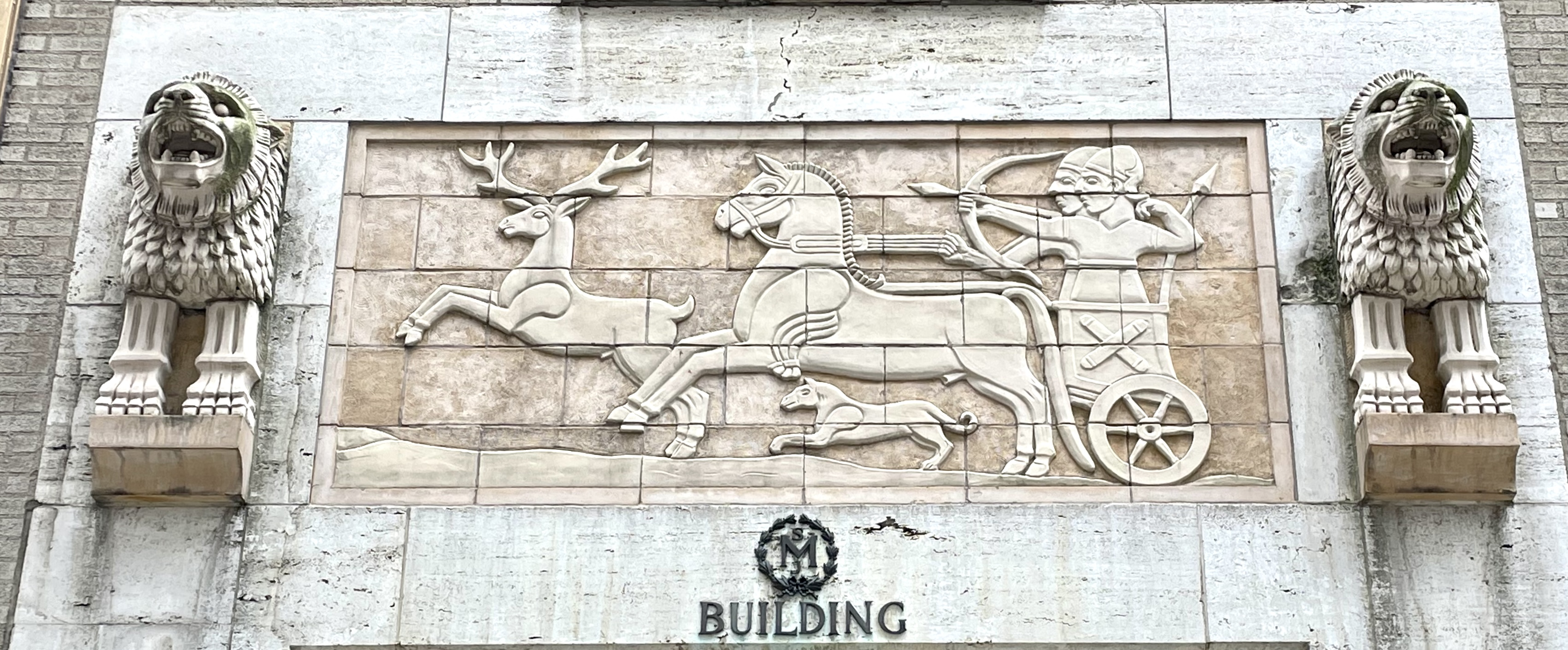
Terra-cotta panel depicting a hunting scene

The entire width of the base is spanned by a water table made of gray granite. The center of the lowest two stories is occupied by a double-height metal-and-glass storefront. There are metal grilles below the storefront windows and fixed panels of glass above the windows. The storefront was previously split into two storefronts in the 2000s, each with a set of recessed double doors. Congregation Beit Simchat Torah combined the two storefronts in 2016 but retained the glass facade. The glass facade measures 50 feet (15 m) wide and is decorated with pinstripes made out of gold leaf. One of the panes is tinted a lavender color, alluding to the fact that Beit Simchat Torah's congregation mainly includes members of the LGBT community; the phrase "It's good to give thanks to the one above" is printed in Hebrew across that pane. The glass is covered with a film that is intended to withstand explosions.

The extreme ends of the base, flanking Beit Simchat Torah's space, contain entrances recessed within travertine marble doorways. The western (right) entrance is used by tenants and their guests, while the eastern (left) entrance is a loading dock. Both entrances are surmounted by tan and brown terracotta panels, which are mirror images of each other. Each panel depicts two hunters in a horse-drawn chariot (one of whom is pointing a bow and arrow at an antelope) as well as a smaller animal under the horse. The two-toned panels helped passersby and visitors to identify the entrances easily. Sculptures of lions protrude from the building on either side of each panel. Above each entrance, placed within the lintel of the doorway, is a bronze insignia. It consists of the acronym "SJM" surrounded by a wreath, under which is the word "Building".

The tenant entrance contains a set of three bronze and glass doors, above which is a bronze transom bar that contains a sign with the address "130 West Thirtieth Street". There are three glass panes above this bar, each of which is divided by a vertical mullion. The freight entrance has roller shutters, above which is a transom bar and three glass panes.

==== Upper stories ====
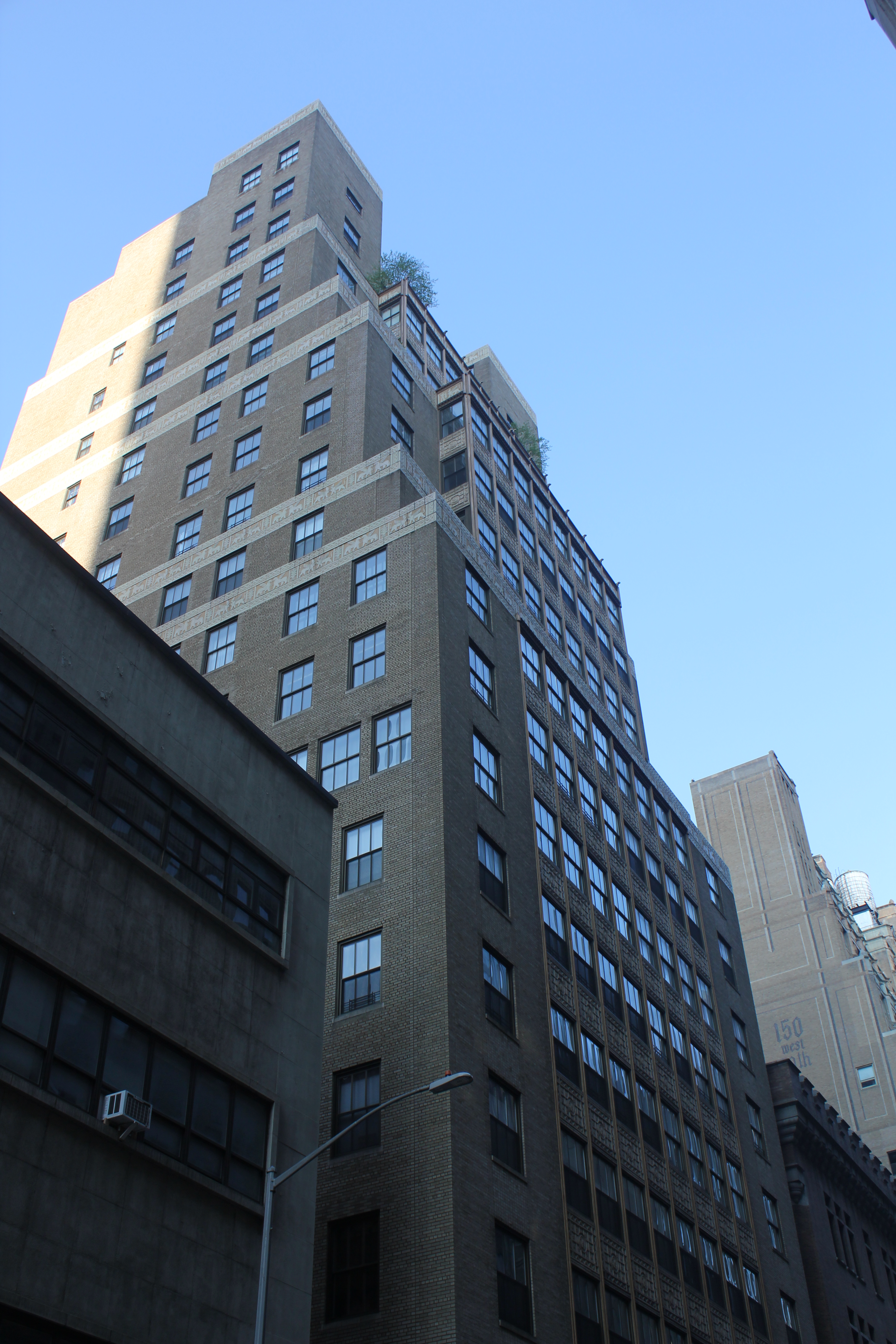
Bands on the upper stories as seen from the east

On the upper stories, the facade of the northern elevation is symmetrically arranged; the eight central bays are grouped together and are flanked by one bay on either end. The outermost bays contain one rectangular three-over-three sash window on each floor. The windows on different floors are separated by spandrels that are composed of brick headers. The eight central bays are separated vertically by steel mullions and horizontally by carved spandrels. Each window is a three-over-three sash window. The spandrels are ornately decorated with terracotta designs, including a grid of flowers; a circular plaque at the center, depicting a bird; and zigzag designs at the borders. The western, eastern, and southern elevations are sparsely decorated and are clad with brick.

The third through 10th stories extend out to the lot line. Above the 10th story, the northern elevation contains a setback that is half a bay deep, as seen on the western and eastern elevations. Above the 11th story, the end bays are set back another half-bay while the center bays do not set back at all. The entire northern elevation sets back again above the 14th story, and the end bays set back above the 15th story. The entire northern elevation sets back again above the 17th story. On the top two or three stories, the outermost bays of the northern elevation are plain towers without windows, while the central bays contain tall windows.

There is a terracotta frieze above each setback, which is divided into panels. Each panel contains winged lions with alternating motifs of horses' and humans' heads. The winged lions have also been characterized as Hittite griffins and sphinxes. The panels are separated from each other by palm trees and are surrounded by zigzag designs. The friezes above the 10th, 11th, 14th, 15th, and 17th stories wrap around to the western and eastern elevations. The panels at the corners are decorated with motifs of the Mesopotamian devil Lamashtu. The panels at the 14th-story setback are surrounded by metal frames and separated vertically by gargoyles. The central panels at the 17th-story setback are surrounded by metal frames. A terracotta cornice runs above the top of the building. The cornices and friezes helped distinguish the building from its surroundings.

=== Features ===
Since 2003, the building has operated as a largely residential condominium development.

==== Synagogue space ====
At the base is a synagogue space for Beit Simchat Torah, which moved to the building in 2016. The synagogue, designed by Architecture Research Office, occupies the ground floor, the basement, and a mezzanine. The synagogue is variously cited as measuring 17,000 square feet (1,600 m^{2}) or 21,000 square feet (2,000 m^{2}). The ground story is variously cited as measuring 16 feet (4.9 m), 18 feet (5.5 m), or 19 feet (5.8 m) tall. The Sheffer Family Lobby, at the front of the ground floor, doubles as an event space and reception room. There is a staircase from the lobby to the basement, which doubles as a social space. The basement has a 13.5-foot (4.1 m) ceiling and includes the Evan Wolfson Community Hall, the Kuriel Chapel, and several classrooms. Because of the small floor area that the synagogue occupies within the building, the chapel also serves as a library. The synagogue space also includes a mixed-gender restroom with wallpaper describing the history of Beit Simchat Torah.

The synagogue's sanctuary is located at the back of the building and can accommodate 299 people simultaneously. The sanctuary is split across the ground floor and mezzanine. It has curved walls with blue wallpaper, as well as movable curved oak pews that could be stored away during events. The pews surround the bimah (speaker's podium), which is placed on the south or rear wall. This contrasted with other synagogues in New York City, where the bimah was placed on the east wall closer to Jerusalem, but allowed all seats to be placed within 35 feet (11 m) of the bimah. One of the interior columns near the bimah, which could not be removed, was converted into a ner tamid or eternal light. On the rear wall is a niche, which contains the congregation's ark and is concealed by an oak screen with Sephardic motifs. Beit Simchat Torah replaced the original rear wall with one made out of structural concrete and glass fiber reinforced concrete. The wall tilts outward at a 10-degree angle and is topped by a skylight measuring 46 feet (14 m) wide. The slanted wall was also intended to improve acoustics by dispersing sound from the bimah.

== History ==
=== Development and early years ===
During the late 19th and early 20th centuries, the site of 130 West 30th Street was historically part of the Tenderloin, a high-crime section of Manhattan roughly bounded by 24th Street, Fifth Avenue, 42nd Street, and Seventh Avenue. The large amounts of criminal activity in the area had spurred the construction of the 23rd Precinct station house from 1907 to 1908. The surrounding neighborhood began to evolve into Manhattan's Garment District in the 1910s, when small garment manufacturers relocated uptown from the Lower East Side. The Garment District between 30th and 42nd Street, as well as the Fur District between 25th and 31st Street, had supplanted the former Tenderloin neighborhood by the 1920s. Around this time, developers in the neighborhood began to erect loft and manufacturing buildings for garment and fur companies.

In March 1927, the 128 West 30th Street Corporation leased a plot at that address to the 130 West 30th Street Corporation. The latter firm planned to demolish the three-story building on the site and hired Cass Gilbert to design a 17-story commercial building on the site. James Stewart & Co. Inc. were hired as general contractors, and M. & L. Hess were hired as the new building's brokers. M. & L. Hess's president, John W. Hahner, had wanted to construct a speculative development with loft space, showrooms, and offices. By the time Gilbert was hired, Hahner had already devised plans for a building on the site; Gilbert indicated that Hahner had given him a drawing of the building's massing, which was dated to February 9, 1927. Gilbert filed plans for the building in May 1927, with an expected cost of $500,000 (equivalent to $9 million in 2025). By that July, James Stewart & Co. was constructing the building, which was intended to contain showrooms and manufacturing spaces for companies in the fur industry. The structure was completed in 1928. It was named for Salomon J. Manne, a fur trader who had a stake in a box at the Metropolitan Opera, where Gilbert also owned a stake in a box.

=== Later use ===
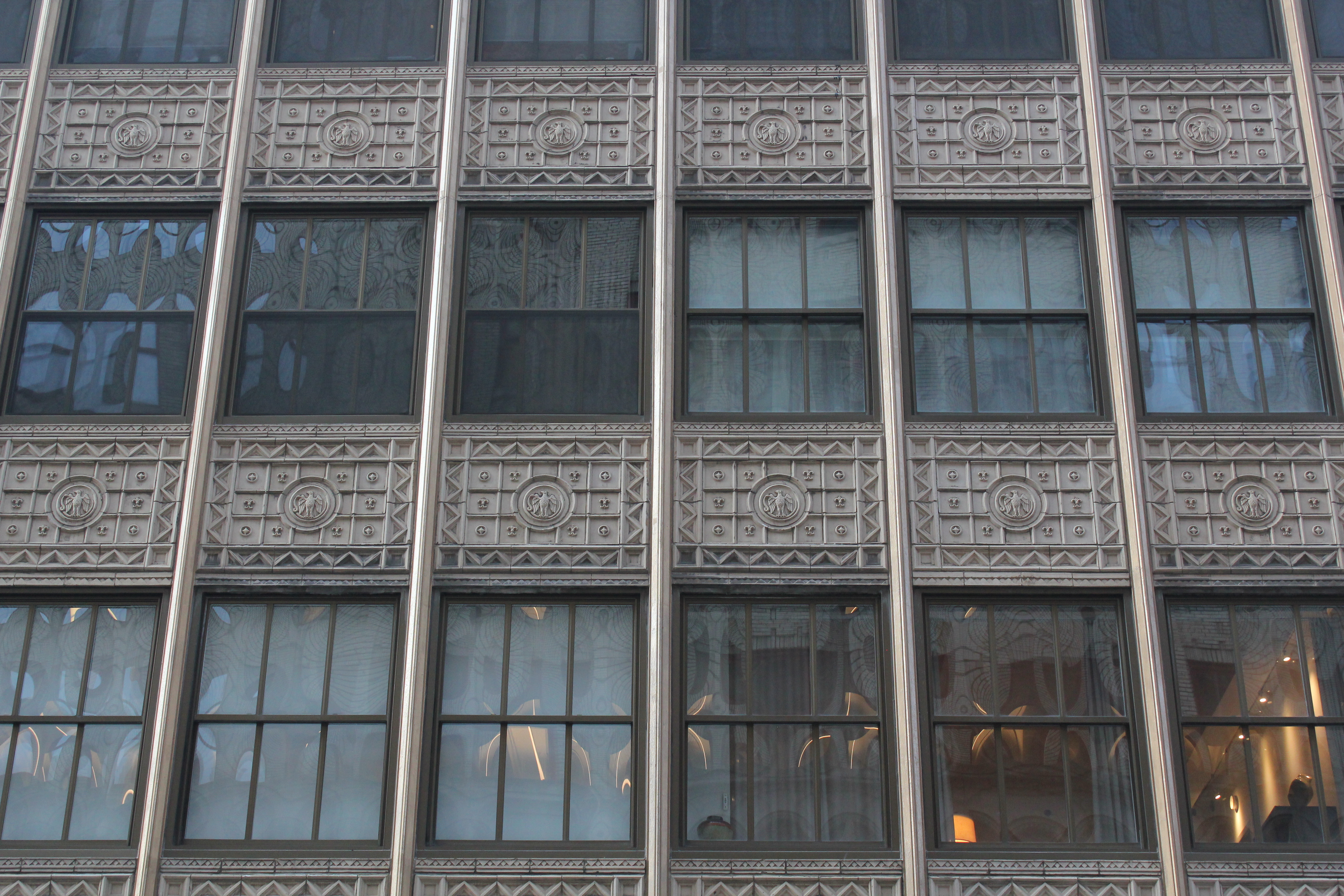
Window details

The building was sold in 1980 to engineering firm Lehr Associates for $1 million (equivalent to $4 million in 2025). The new owner gradually converted the building into office space. Some of the existing tenants faced rent increases of more than 200 percent and were forced to relocate.

Henry Justin acquired the building in 2000; at the time, its tenants were mainly architecture and engineering companies. The New York City Landmarks Preservation Commission designated the building as a landmark in 2001, several days before Justin was to have finalized his acquisition of the building. As a result, 130 West 30th Street was subjected to stringent preservation regulations, which would have forced Justin to spend $2 million (equivalent to $4 million in 2025) on repairs. Justin decided to convert the building to mostly residential condominiums to raise money for the repairs, as he could not continue to profit from the building without raising rents significantly. The building was converted to a residential condominium in 2003. After the 45 condominium units went on sale, they were all sold within sixty days. Gilbert's grandson allowed Justin to rename the condominium for Cass Gilbert; Justin said that he might have "called it the Beaver Pelt Building" if Gilbert's grandson had not allowed him to use Gilbert's name.

In June 2011, Congregation Beit Simchat Torah, an LGBT synagogue, purchased the commercial space at 130 West 30th Street for $7 million (equivalent to $10 million in 2025), having looked at 100 spaces over the previous sixteen years. The congregation hired Architecture Research Office to redesign the lowest three stories as a synagogue, and it began to raise another $7 million or $8 million to fund the renovation. Referencing the fact that the Assyrians had historically oppressed the Jews, New York Times journalist David W. Dunlap said the Assyrians were not "the likeliest of people to be ornamenting a synagogue". The renovation of the base was originally supposed to be completed by 2013 but was not finished until April 2016.

== See also ==
- List of New York City Designated Landmarks in Manhattan from 14th to 59th Streets
