= Congregation Beit Simchat Torah =

Synagogue in Manhattan, New York

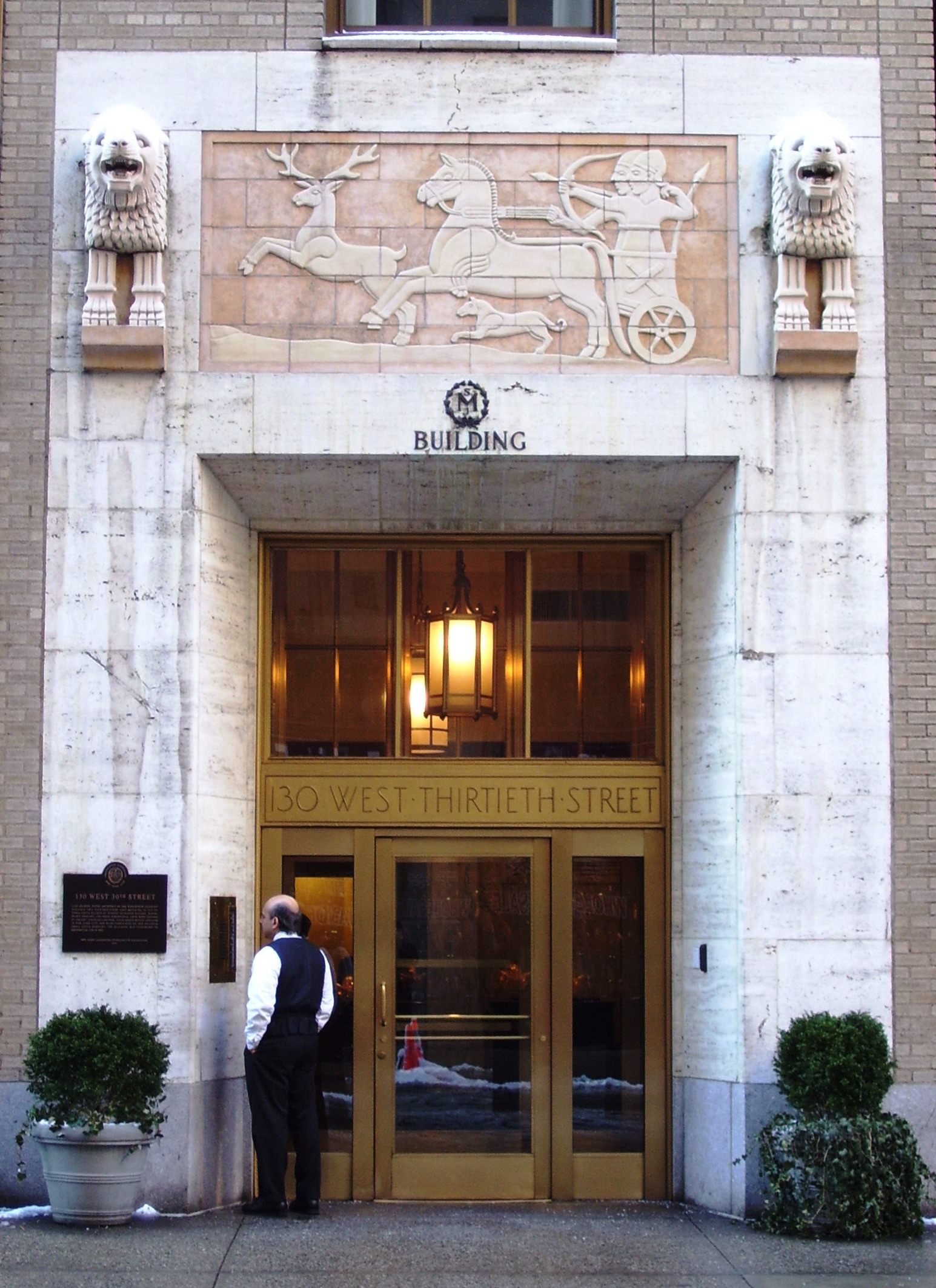
- The entrance to the synagogue

- Location in Manhattan

Religion
- Affiliation: Judaism
- Rite: Non-denominational / Progressive
- Ecclesiastical or organisational status: Synagogue
- Leadership: Rabbi Yael Werber and Cantor Sam Rosen
- Status: Active

Location
- Location: 130 West 30th Street, Midtown, Manhattan, New York City, New York
- Country: United States
- Coordinates: 40°44′13″N 74°00′31″W

Architecture
- Type: Commercial building (1927); Residential building (2003)
- Founder: Jacob Gubbay and others
- Established: 1973 (as a congregation)
- Completed: 2016 (as a synagogue)

Website
- cbst.org

Congregation Beit Simchat Torah ("CBST") is a non-denominational Jewish, pluralistic, progressive, and LGBTQ+ synagogue located at 130 West 30th Street in Manhattan, New York City.

The congregation was founded in 1973 by and for LGBTQ people, and is the world's largest LGBTQ synagogue as of 2016. CBST serves Jews of all sexual orientations and gender identities and their families and friends. During 1992–2024, the congregation was led by Senior Rabbi Emerita Sharon Kleinbaum. Current clergy include Associate Rabbi Yael Werber and Cantor Sam Rosen. CBST is not affiliated with any formal denomination or branch of Judaism.

== History ==
The congregation, founded in 1973 by twelve gay Jewish men and led by Jacob Gubbay, originally met in Chelsea's Church of the Holy Apostles and brought its prayer materials to services each week in a brown paper bag. In 1978, they began renting space in the West Village at 57 Bethune Street—in the Westbeth Artists Community residential-artistic complex—for offices, a Hebrew school, and a sanctuary. However, the space was not large enough for Friday night services (i.e., Kabbalat Shabbat and maariv), which continued to be held in the church. The synagogue has also held annual Yom Kippur services at the Jacob Javits Convention Center: the only free-to-attend High Holy Day services held in the city. Yom Kippur services have drawn over 4,000 people.

=== 130 West 30th Street ===
In June 2011, after 16 years of searching, the congregation purchased a large space in Chelsea, Manhattan, at 130 West 30th Street between Sixth Avenue and Seventh Avenue. Built in 1927–28, the landmarked Assyrian Revival-style building was designed by architect Cass Gilbert. It underwent renovations between 2013 and 2016. The "Dedication of Our New Home" was marked that year with a celebration on April 3.

== Beliefs ==
=== Marriage ===
The synagogue has an inclusive vision and celebrates both opposite-sex marriages and same-sex marriages.

== Notable members ==
- Barbara Gaines (born 1956), television producer
- Brad Hoylman (born 1965), New York State Senator
- Mike Moskowitz, Ultra-Orthodox rabbi, LGBTQ ally, and Scholar-in-Residence for Trans and Queer Jewish Studies at CBST
- Cynthia Nixon (born 1966), actress and activist
- David L. Reich (born 1960), president and chief operating officer of Mount Sinai Hospital and president of Mount Sinai Queens
- Janet Weinberg (1955–2018), advocate for people with HIV/AIDS and disabilities
- Randi Weingarten (born 1957), president of the American Federation of Teachers
- Edith Windsor (1929–2017), successfully brought a federal lawsuit, United States v. Windsor, against the Defense of Marriage Act

== See also ==
- Judaism and sexual orientation
- Judaism and sexuality
- LGBT and religion topics
- LGBT clergy in Judaism
- LGBT-affirming denominations in Judaism
- Religion and homosexuality
- Same-sex marriage and Judaism
