= Rosalyn Richter =

American lawyer

Roz Richter

Associate Justice of the New York Supreme Court Appellate Division for the 1st Department
- In office March 2009 – July 2020
- Appointed by: David Paterson
- Preceded by: Seat established
- Succeeded by: ???

Personal details
- Spouse: Janet Weinberg (m. 2011; died 2018)
- Education: Columbia University (BA); Brooklyn Law School (JD)

Rosalyn Richter is an American lawyer who served as an associate justice of the New York Appellate Division of the Supreme Court, First Judicial Department.

== Early life and education ==
Richter is the daughter of Anita Richter and the late Nathaniel Richter. She is a 1976 graduate of Barnard College of Columbia University and a 1979 graduate of Brooklyn Law School.

== Legal career ==
Richter enjoyed a lengthy career in the judiciary. She was instrumental in the fight for Gay Rights publishing in 1982 the report: "Anti-Gay Legislation: An Attempt to Sanction Inequality?" She began serving on the New York City Criminal Court from 1990 to 1996. Richter then proceeded to serve as a New York Supreme Court Justice, from 2002 to 2009. She was designated a Justice for the Appellate Division, First Judicial Department in 2008 by Governor David Paterson.

On August 3, 2018, Richter received the Dan Bradley Award, the National LGBT Bar Association's highest honor, in recognition of her pathbreaking legacy of service. As Richter, put it, she was honored for "being so out in the late 1970s, and 1980s and for being out throughout [her] judicial career."

Justice Richter ended her lengthy judicial career by retiring in July 2020.

On October 12, 2020, Justice Richter joined Arnold & Porter's Complex Litigation practice as Senior Counsel.

== Personal life ==
Richter married her wife, Janet Weinberg, in August 2011, shortly after same-sex marriage was legalized in the state of New York. Weinberg died on September 1, 2018, in the Bronx.

== See also ==
- List of LGBT jurists in the United States
