= Atlantic Terra Cotta Company =

Producer of architectural terra cotta

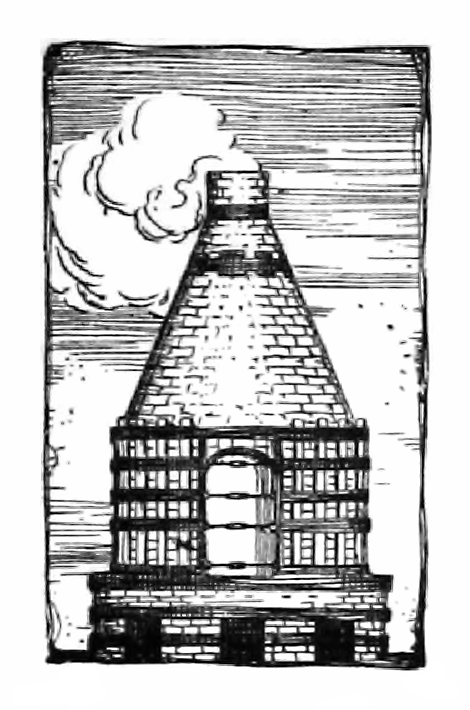
- Industry: Clay industry
- Founded: 1879 (as Perth Amboy Terra Cotta Company)
- Founder: Alfred Hall
- Defunct: 1943
- Fate: Dissolved
- Headquarters: Perth Amboy, New Jersey, U.S.

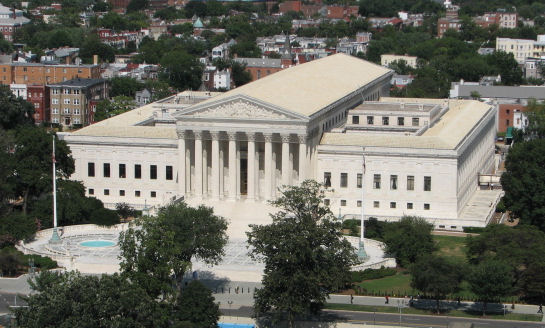
The Atlantic Terra Cotta Company created the Supreme Court Building's clay tile roof in 1932.

The Atlantic Terra Cotta Company was established in 1879 as the Perth Amboy Terra Cotta in Perth Amboy, New Jersey due to rich regional supplies of clay. It was one of the first successful glazed architectural terra-cotta companies in the United States.

== History ==
=== Perth Amboy Terra Cotta Company ===
Alfred Hall had previously owned a company that produced porcelain and household wares but was inspired to begin production of Architectural terra cotta after receiving advice from his nephew. Hall attempted to dominate the market for Architectural terra cotta, but his success led to the formation of multiple regional competitors in the 1880s, such as the New Jersey Terra Cotta Company, the Standard Terra Cotta Company, and the Excelsior Terra Cotta Company.

The demand for architectural terra cotta grew dramatically in the last two decades of the 1800s, with total annual industry profits rising from one million dollars in 1890 to eight million in 1900.

=== Atlantic Terra Cotta Company ===
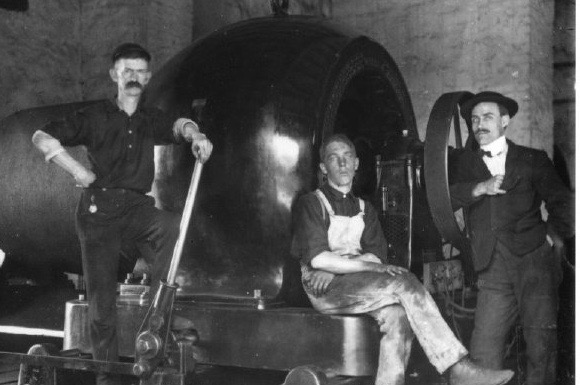
Workers at the Atlantic Terra Cotta Company plant in Rocky Hill, New Jersey

Between 1906 and 1907 the Perth Amboy Terra Cotta Company, the Excelsior Terra Cotta Company, the Standard Terra Cotta Company, and the Atlantic Terra Cotta Company of Staten Island merged, with the newly formed corporation named after the latter group. The sheer size of the new group allowed it to become the leading manufacturer on the East Coast and secure contracts producing terra cotta for much of the steel-frame construction in the Northeast.

At the time of the merger the company had four plants, in Perth Amboy and Rocky Hill, New Jersey, Staten Island, New York, and Eastpoint, Georgia.

In 1921 the company was charged with violating the Sherman Anti-Trust Act and colluding with competitors by sharing pricing information with other manufacturers of terra cotta. The company weathered that difficulty and subsequent fines, but was hit hard by the Great Depression, when construction of skyscrapers paused and terra cotta ornamentation suddenly seemed unjustifiably expensive.

Prevailing architectural attitudes favored materials such as glass, metal, and concrete and the company's work diminished over the next decade. The company ceased operations in 1943.

== Notable projects ==
Some of the company's most notable projects include the Flatiron Building (1901), the Woolworth Building (1910), the Philadelphia Museum of Art (1928), and the United States Supreme Court (1932).

Additionally, the Atlantic Terra Cotta Company and its predecessors contributed significantly to the architecture of Perth Amboy, which features a total of 111 structures with terra cotta detailing or facades.

== Gallery ==
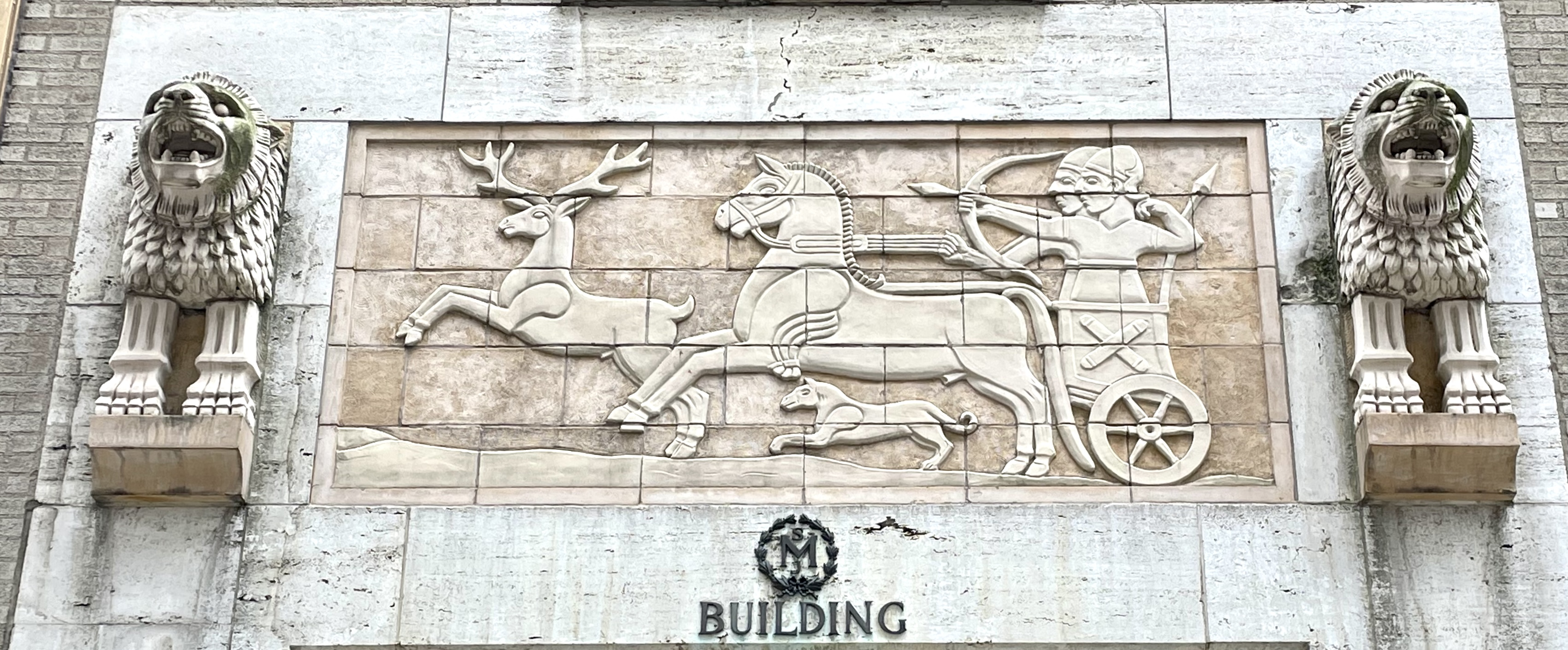
Decorative hunting scene at 130 West 30th Street, New York City

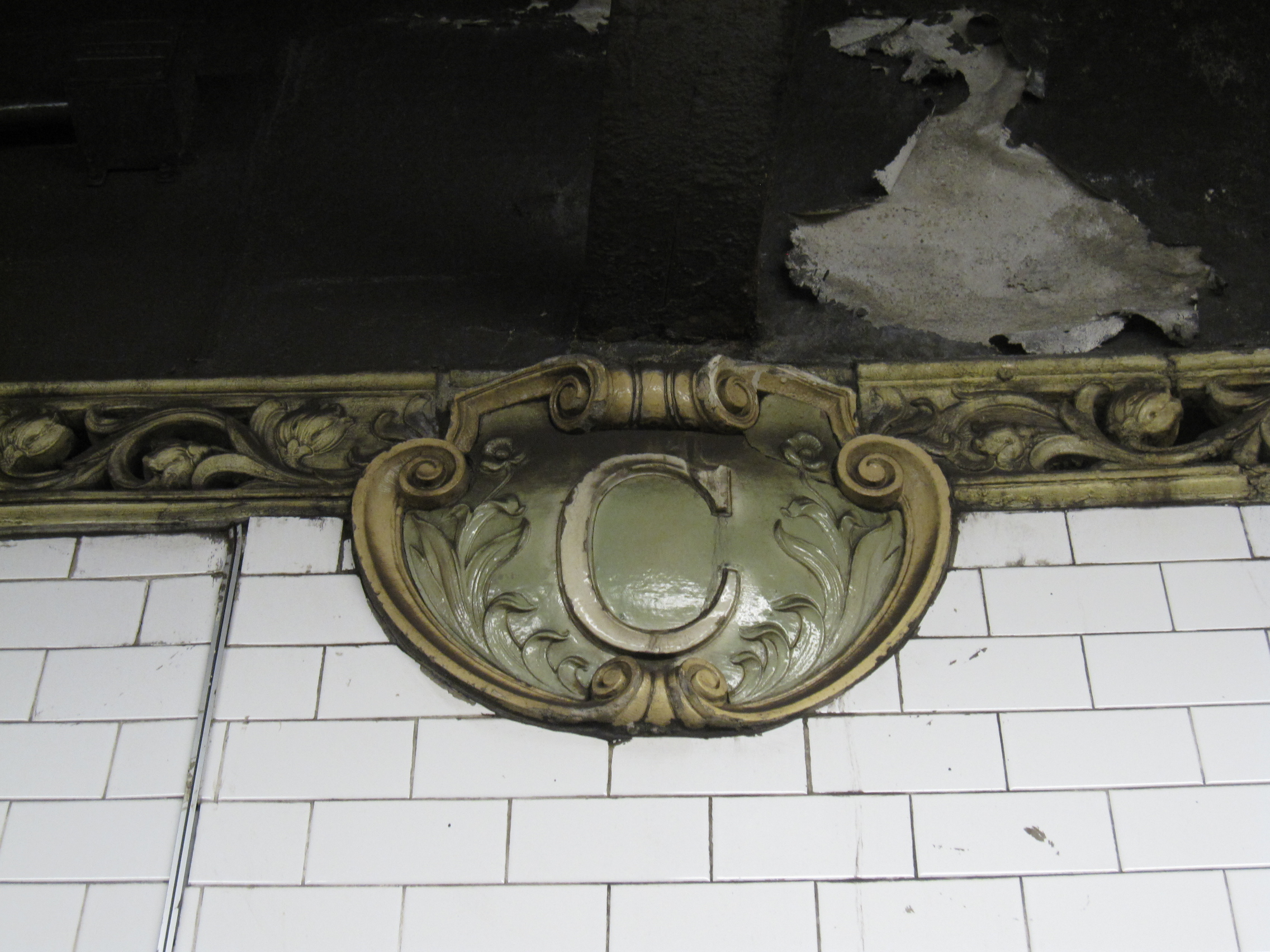
Glazed terra cotta ornamentation in Canal Street Station, New York City

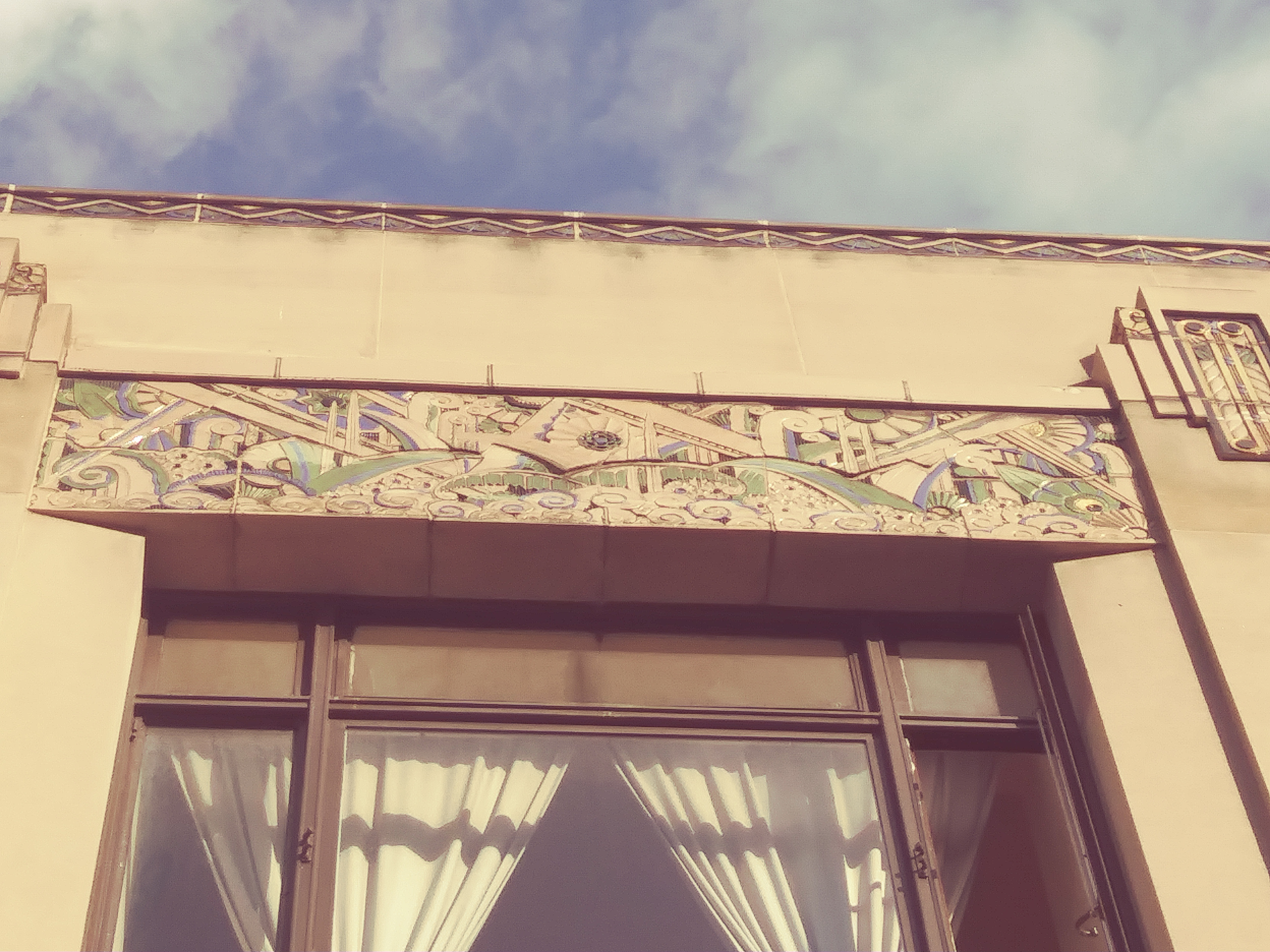
The former Horn & Hardart building at 228 West 104th Street, New York City

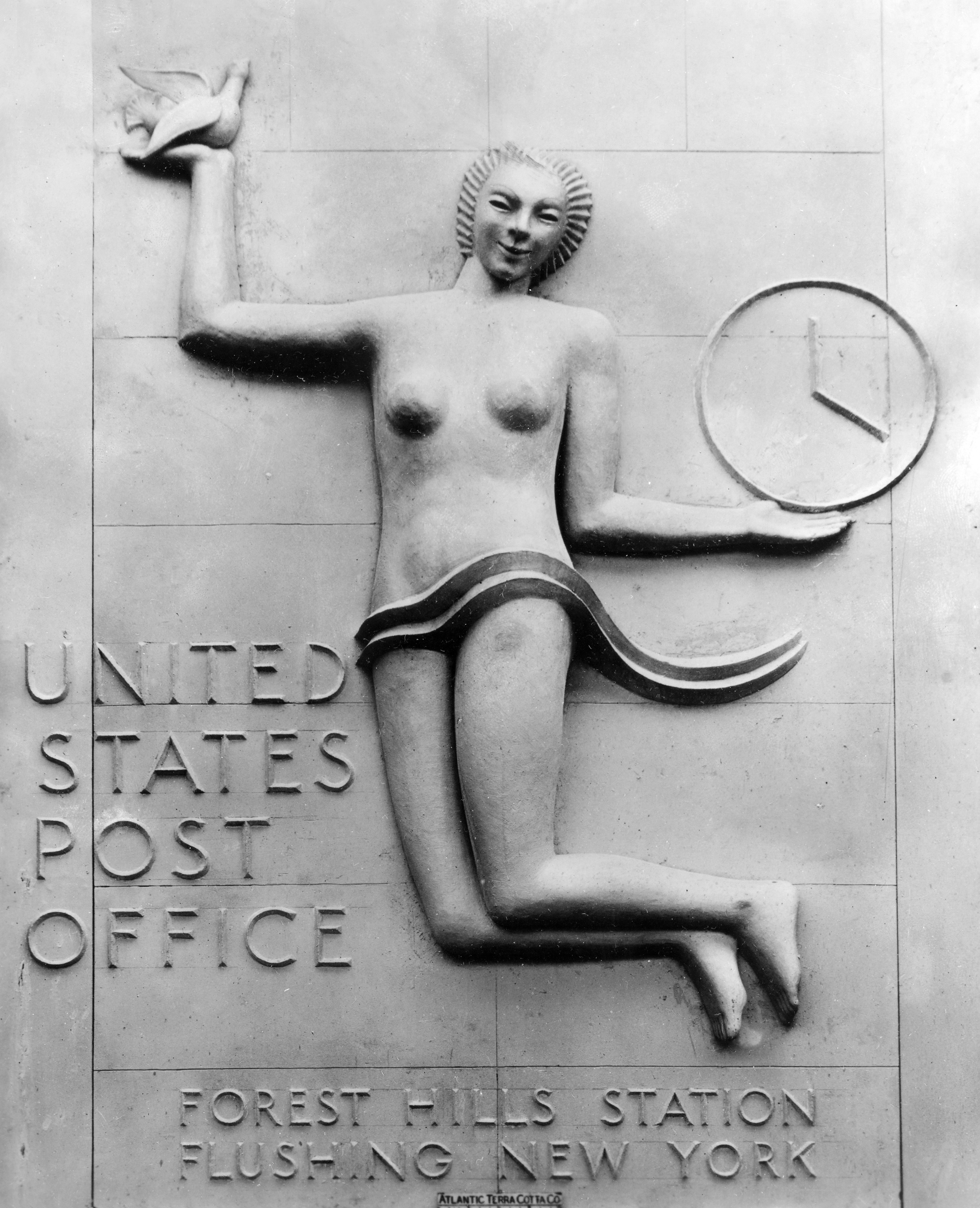
The Spirit of Communication, relief in the Forest Hills Station, Flushing, Queens, New York

== See also ==
- Architectural terracotta
- Glazed architectural terra-cotta
