= Running of the interns =

United States Supreme Court practice

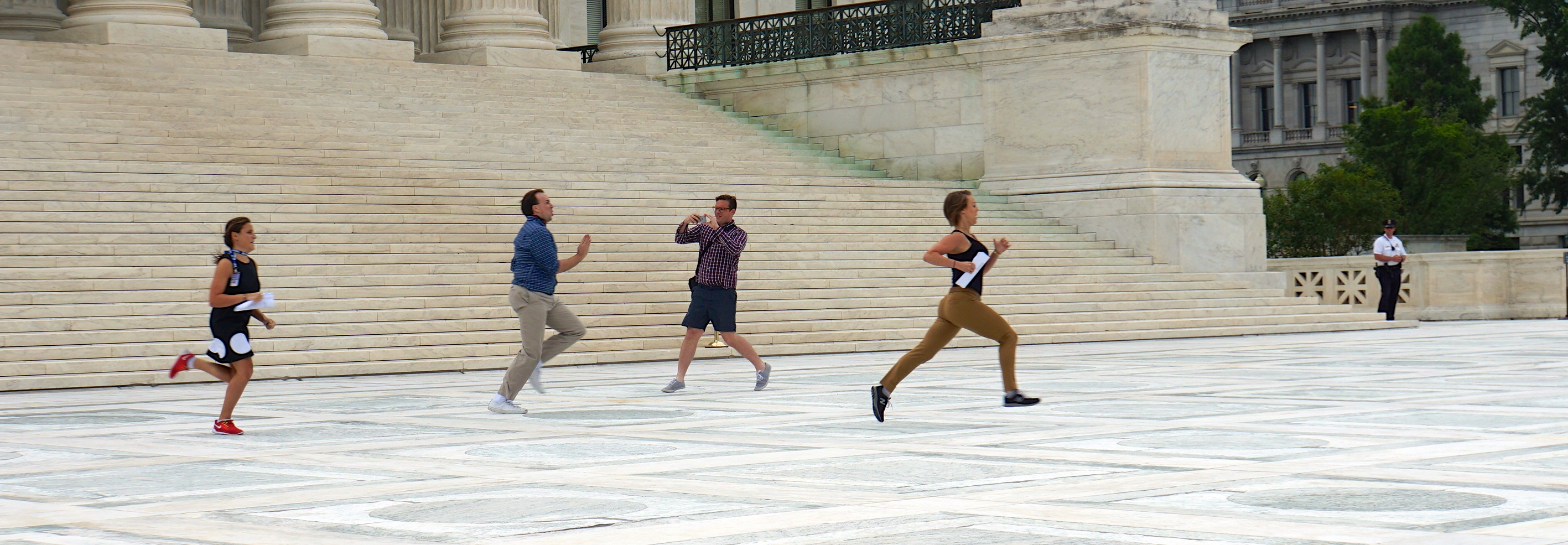
Runners carrying the Supreme Court's Obergefell v. Hodges decision on marriage equality (2015)

The running of the interns is a Washington, DC, tradition, sometimes called a race, involving interns of news outlets running to deliver results of major decisions by the Supreme Court of the United States to the press. Many media outlets have made note of this, including BuzzFeed, Newsweek, NPR, and Cosmopolitan.

In recent years, the Supreme Court has released PDF opinions on supremecourt.gov around the same time as the majority opinion is announced from the bench. For instance, in the SCOTUSblog live coverage of opinion announcements of 10:00 a.m. ET on June 26, 2018, news that Justice Thomas was announcing the decision in National Institute of Family and Life Advocates v. Becerra was posted at 10:01, followed by a link to the official PDF at 10:02, during Thomas's opinion announcement, which lasted about five minutes. In contrast, for Obergefell v. Hodges in 2015, those times were 10:01 (announcement) and 10:05 (PDF), with interns delivering paper copies at 10:01. From March 2020 to June 2022, opinions were released exclusively online.

== History ==
Since 1946, recording devices have been banned inside the courtroom of the United States Supreme Court Building. Thus, hand-delivered paper copies were the fastest way for news organizations to receive a particular landmark ruling.

The Supreme Court's decision is printed and delivered to a clerk's office, where it is handed to members of the press. Interns are not credentialed and must therefore wait in the hallway outside the press room. Producers hand the paper copy rulings to their network interns who sprint to deliver them to their respective organizations. The run itself is approximately 1/8–1/4 mile (200–400 m), from the courtroom to broadcasters waiting outside. Supporters and protestors alike cheer on the delivery of the opinions. According to one intern, justices may still be announcing the decision by the time they are back inside.

The interns often run wearing sneakers and business casual suits or skirts in 90 °F (32 °C) heat.

In 2015, the interns were briefly removed after a CNN intern was caught by Supreme Court Police recording video footage with a GoPro camera.

In 2016, interns relayed 13 decisions over three mornings.

== Notable decision coverage ==
- Whole Woman's Health v. Hellerstedt
- King v. Burwell
- Obergefell v. Hodges
- McDonnell v. United States
