= Geela Rayzel Raphael =

American rabbi

- Born: Randy Robinson; Knoxville, Tennessee, U.S.
- Education: Indiana University Bloomington; Brandeis University; Reconstructionist Rabbinical College
- Occupation: Rabbi
- Spouse: Simcha Paull Raphael
- Children: 2
- Website: www.shechinah.com

Geela Rayzel Raphael (born Randy Robinson) is an American rabbi, writer, and musician who imbues Jewish ritual and liturgy with feminist, Kabbalistic and Reconstructionist interpretations and insights.

== Biography ==
Raphael is a native of Knoxville, Tennessee, daughter of Natalie and Mitchell Robinson, and grew up in a Conservative Jewish family. She graduated from West High School in 1971. She completed her undergraduate degree at Indiana University Bloomington and earned a master's degree in contemporary Jewish studies from Brandeis University.

In the late 1970s/early 1980s, Raphael first encountered the Jewish Renewal movement and Jewish feminism. She worked within the Jewish community for 15 years, first as the director of the Jewish Student Federation at York University in Toronto and later as director of the Graduate Student Project at Hillel of Greater Philadelphia. After studying at Pardes Yeshiva in Jerusalem for a year in 1984–85, she returned to Toronto and started a Rosh Chodesh group, where she began to write feminist Jewish songs including "By the Shores/Miriam and her Timbrels" inspired by the verse in Exodus Va-tikach Miriam Hanivea et ha-tof b'yadah. She then became more involved in feminist Jewish activism.

Raphael received a Wexner Graduate Fellowship to attend the Reconstructionist Rabbinical College and was ordained in 1997. She served as rabbi of Reconstructionist congregation Leyv Ha-Ir in Philadelphia for nine years, and later Beth Israel Congregation in Woodbury, New Jersey, as well as the rabbinical director of Faithways, the interfaith family-support network of the Jewish Family and Children's Services of Greater Philadelphia.

Raphael has worked to bring teachings of the Jewish Renewal movement to women in her community. She has offered a course on “Feminine God Language” and teaches that Shekhinah emphasizes this feminine depiction of God as a way to correct a spiritual imbalance. She also teaches about biblical women, new rituals, Rosh Chodesh, and Kabbalah.

In 1992, Raphael conceived the first recorded Jewish ritual for abortion in the US. She wrote with her husband Simcha "Ritual for Miscarriage, Healing and New Life" after infertility treatments and the miscarriage of triplets. In her revised Kiddush Levana liturgy, both gender and terminology are transformed: God is invoked as both Shekhinah and Rachamemah, the latter of which connects with the Hebrew term for the appearance of the new moon, molad, which literally means "birth." Rosh Chodesh becomes a festival that links directly to the feminine aspect of divinity.

Raphael has counseled intermarried couples to find contemporary relevance in Jewish rituals, such as when eating bitter herbs during Passover the acknowledge bitter personal experiences. She notes the Jewish community's diversity, from Orthodox to secular, racially, and interfaith. She notes she's welcoming interfaith couples rather than promoting interfaith marriages, acknowledging what is already happening.

== Music ==
Raphael's time in Israel and involvement in the Jewish feminist women's network B'not Esh influenced her music. After returning to Jerusalem in 1988–89, she became a member of Women of the Wall, worshiping with other women at the Western Wall. It was here that she wrote the lyrics for Holy Mother, Shechinah Soul which appears on her album Friday Night Revived, based on the Kabbalat Shabbat service.

She is the co-creater of Shabbat Unplugged, a musical Shabbat service, recorded the album "Bible Bases A-beltin'" with songs about women of the Bible, and is a member of the a capella trio MIRAJ, who sing about the Jewish feminist experience and offer songs as new liturgy. She also wrote “Women of Valor Movement 3” with composer Andrea Clearfield.

== Nechama minyan ==
After her mother died December 31, 2020, during the COVID-19 pandemic, a Zoom service was the only option to mourn in community during the seven-day shiva period. For sheloshim, she decided to ask 30 different spiritual leaders in her Jewish network to lead a service for each of the 30-day period. During this time additional people asked to join her service to say the mourner's kaddish for their family members who had died. She decided to continue this Zoom minyan after this period, calling it the “Nechama” minyan after her mother Natalie, whose Hebrew name was Nechama.

== Selected publications ==
- Raphael, Geela-Rayzel (1998). "18 Kiddush HaLevana: Sanctifying the New Moon". In Berrin, Susan (ed.). Celebrating the New Moon: A Rosh Chodesh Anthology. Northvale, New Jersey: Jason Aronson, Incorporated. pp. 144–150. ISBN 978-1-4616-2773-9.
- Raphael, Geela Rayzel (2008). "From Ancient Times to Modern Meaning: Jewish Women Claim Their Ritual Power". In Goldstein, Elyse (ed.). New Jewish Feminism: Probing the Past, Forging the Future. Woodstock, Vermont: Jewish Lights Publishing. pp. 90–101. ISBN 978-1-58023-359-0. OCLC 227032978.
- Raphael, Rabbi Geela Rayzel (2016). New Moon. Illustrations by Susan Cathcard and Marilyn Kane. Three Gems Publishing. ISBN 978-0-692-67646-2.
- Raphael, Rabbi Geela Rayzel (2017). Angels for Dreamtime. Illustrations by Susan Cathcard and Marilyn Kane. Balboa Press. ISBN 978-1-5043-9081-1.
- Rabbi Rayzel Raphael (October 11, 2018). "On Getting a Call Asking to be Forgiven". The Wexner Foundation.
- Rabbi Geela-Rayzel Raphael. "Daughters of the Moon". Ritualwell.

== Personal life ==
Raphael is married to Simcha Paull Raphael. She and her husband created their surname by combining their birth surnames Robinson (hers) and Paull (his). They have two children.
