= Susan Schnur =

American rabbi, psychologist, and writer (born 1951)

- Born: 1951 (age 74–75)
- Education: Ordained as Reconstructionist Rabbi at Reconstructionist Rabbinical College, 1982, Degree in Creative Writing at the Johns Hopkins Writing Seminar, Degree in psychology at Rutgers University, 2007
- Occupations: Rabbi, psychologist, writer and editor
- Employer: Lilith magazine
- Awards: Best Children's Books of the Year list, Bank Street College of Education, 2011, for Tashlich at Turtle Rock

Susan Schnur (born April 21, 1951) is an American rabbi, psychologist, editor, and writer of children's books. Schnur was ordained by the Reconstructionist Rabbinical College in 1982, making her among the first 12 Reconstructionist rabbis and among the first 61 female rabbis in the world. She received a master's degree in Creative Writing from the Johns Hopkins Writing Seminars and a Doctorate in Psychology from Rutgers University.

Schnur has written for many publications, and formerly wrote a weekly column for the New York Times. She has served as editor of Lilith since 1995. She has described herself as a "recovering rabbi" for whom Lilith is a "paper pulpit" from which she preaches Jewish feminism. Through Lilith, she has said, she and her co-editors "helped to transform Judaism into something beautiful and plausible for thousands of Jewish women."

Schnur has been widely noted for her writings on forgiveness, which show how gender matters in discussions of forgiveness and which breaks down rigid distinctions between forgiving and not forgiving. Geoffrey Claussen identifies Schnur as a contributor to modern musar literature.

== Tashlich at Turtle Rock ==
Schnur is known for her book titled Tashlich at Turtle Rock. The book is about a family's special tradition of taking a hike on Rosh Hashanah to perform the ceremony of Tashlich.

== Publications ==
- "Analyze This"
- "A Woman's Tashlich: Walking Along the Water's Edge with Liturgist Marcia Falk & Rabbi Susan Schnur"
- "Celebrating 35 Years of Jewish Women's Stories"
- "Hers"
- "How Being a Jew & Being a Feminist Collide, Co-Evolve, Cohabit in 7 Women's Lives"
- "Is Our Suffering Transformative?"
- "Losing a Child: How Grief Has Fueled Three Mothers' Activism"
