= David Teutsch =

American rabbi, professor, and author

David A. Teutsch is professor emeritus at the Reconstructionist Rabbinical College where he was president from 1993 to 2001 and the founding director of the Center for Jewish Ethics. He is also the editor-in-chief of the Reconstructionist Kol Haneshamah prayerbook series as well as the three-volume Guide to Jewish Practice.

== Early life and education ==
Teutsch grew up in Salt Lake City, Utah, and earned and A.B. from Harvard University in 1972 focusing on Jewish studies. During and shortly after college, Teutsch realized the importance of revitalizing, rather than abandoning, old religious traditions. He believed this required fresh thought and action to breathe new life into the rich but somewhat stagnant traditions. Teutsch emphasized that Judaism is both a religion and a culture, benefiting from the cultural pride of minorities in the U.S. and the growth of modern Israel. At the time he also noted that Jewish religious life serves both its conservative members and those seeking a meaningful counterculture, and that philosophy and law didn't seem to look to Jewish traditions for guidance.

He was the first rabbi of Temple Ramat Shalom in South Spring Valley, New York where he began serving as a student rabbi in 1974, and literally helped build the synagogue when the contractors who were to finish completion of the building went bankrupt. Teutsch described the congregation as liberal-traditional where members were encouraged to ask questions towards making the service more relevant for modern times. He graduated Hebrew Union College – Jewish Institute of Religion in 1977.

He later earned a Ph.D. from Wharton's social-systems sciences program while working at the Reconstructionist Rabbinical College (RRC).

== Career ==
In 1980, Teutsch was named executive director of the Jewish Reconstructionist Federation, where he served until 1986, when he became the dean of admissions at the Reconstructionist Rabbinical College. He emphasized a major teaching of Mordecai Kaplan, founder of the Reconstructionist movement, was that it is both the right and responsibility of every Jew to reconstruct Judaism in their own time. In 1990, Teutsch was appointed executive vice president of the college and the director of its Department of Contemporary Civilization. While in that role, he coordinated the application and review process to earn a "fully accredited" grade from the Middle States Commission on Higher Education.

Teutsch became president of RRC in 1993, succeeding Arthur Green. He highlighted that while some critics believed Reconstructionism would lose relevance as other Jewish movements adopted its innovations, the need for morally driven change would always persist. In the late 1990s, the movement's main challenge was meeting the demand for trained rabbis to serve various Jewish institutions. Teutsch credited Reconstructionism's growth to its ability to meet the spiritual and intellectual needs of North American Jews within a democratic framework. The movement welcomed intermarried individuals, converts, and anyone identifying as Jewish, and its focus on Jewish study, spirituality, and the arts contributed to its rising popularity. He also observed a shift in spirituality, with more Jews seeking integrated paths into Jewish life. This interest led to the creation of a center for Jewish ethics and expanded arts programs at the college. Teutsch stepped down as president of RRC in the summer of 2002 to pursue research and teaching. At the start of his presidency, RRC was in poor financial shape and some feared his corporate style might conflict with the institution's countercultural ethos. However, he was credited with adopting a more pragmatic approach to social action and securing donations that significantly expanded the school's infrastructure.

After stepping down from the presidency of RRC, Teutsch stayed at the college where he was the Weiner Professor of Contemporary Jewish Civilization and later became director of the Levin-Lieber Program in Jewish Ethics. At this time he also worked on editing the Guide to Jewish Practice. He noted that he believed this guide along with the Kol Haneshamah prayerbook series made the biggest difference in promoting the Reconstructionist movement. His expertise on Jewish perspectives of ethical considerations was often quoted in the press, e.g. the Terri Schiavo case, Madoff investment scandal, and Trump's inflammatory comments about minority groups.

In 2022, Teutsch drafted a letter “A call to action for clergy in protest of Israeli government extremists” that was signed by several hundred rabbis and cantors expressing dismay about the far-right policies of the newly elected government of Israel.

== Books ==
Teutsch is the editor-in-chief of the Kol Haneshamah series, which includes prayer books for weekday prayer, Shabbat and festivals, high holidays, rituals for the home, and prayers for a house of mourning. The prayer book “Kol Haneshamah for Sabbath and Holidays” was officially published in 1994, the 25th anniversary year of the rabbinical college. It differentiated itself from other siddurim in its use of gender-neutral language and alternative language besides "Lord" used for God. The high holiday "Prayerbook for the Days of Awe", published in 1999, introduced guided meditations, contemplative drawings, and poems by renowned poets such as Maya Angelou. It featured a gender-neutral English translation with three service options: a traditional service, an innovative shorter one, and another focused on English readings. The 1,275-page book, weighing 2.75 pounds, was the first Reconstructionist High Holy Day prayer book since 1948. Teutsch emphasized the book's inclusivity of women in language and content and its user-friendly design, noting that incorporating commentary, poetry, a new translation, and maintaining the traditional liturgy inevitably resulted in a very large book.

He is also editor of the three-volume Guide to Jewish Practice. The first volume, A Guide to Jewish Practice: Everyday Living, is a progressive Jewish guide covering daily religious practices, including kashrut and tzedakah, as well as topics like business, family, and sexual ethics and won a National Jewish Book Award in 2011.

=== Bibliography (selected) ===
- Kol Haneshamah Prayerbook Series, David A. Teutsch, editor-in-chief
1. Erev Shabbat: Shabbat Eve (2nd ed.). Reconstructionist Press. 1993 [1989].
2. Shirim Uvrahot: Songs, Blessings and Rituals for the Home. Reconstructionist Press. 1991. ISBN 978-0935457445.
3. Shabbat Vehagim: Sabbath and Festivals (3rd ed.). Reconstructionist Press. 1998 [1994]. ISBN 978-0935457469.
4. Limot Hol: Daily Prayer Book. Reconstructionist Press. 1996. ISBN 978-0935457476.
5. Prayerbook for the Days of Awe (Mahzor LeYamim Nora'im). Reconstructionist Press. 1999. ISBN 978-0935457483.
6. Tefilot Leveyt Ha'avel: Prayers for a House of Mourning. Reconstructionist Press. 2001. ISBN 978-0935457438.
- Guide to Jewish Practice (three volumes)
1. Teutsch, David A., ed. (2011). Guide to Jewish Practice: Everyday Living. Vol. 1. RRC Press. ISBN 978-0938945185.
2. Teutsch, David A., ed. (2014). Guide to Jewish Practice: Shabbat and Holidays. Vol. 2. RRC Press. ISBN 978-0938945024.
3. Teutsch, David A., ed. (2014). Guide to Jewish Practice: The Life Cycle. Vol. 3. RRC Press. ISBN 978-0938945031.
- Teutsch, David A., ed. (1992). Imagining the Jewish Future: Essays and Responses. Albany: SUNY Press. ISBN 978-0-7914-1168-1.
- Teutsch, David A. (2002). "Reconstructionism and the Public Square: A Multiculture Approach to Judaism in American". In Mittleman, Alan; Licht, Robert A.; Sarna, Jonathan D. (eds.). Jewish Polity and American Civil Society: Communal Agencies and Religious Movements in the American Public Sphere. Lanham, Md.: Rowman & Littlefield. pp. 337–362. ISBN 978-0-7425-2122-3.
- Teutsch, David A. (2013). Spiritual Community: The Power to Restore Hope, Commitment and Joy. Turner Publishing Company. ISBN 978-1-58023-707-9.
- Price, Marilyn; Teutsch, David A. (2017). From Gratitude to Blessings and Back. Wipf and Stock Publishers. ISBN 978-1-5326-1771-3.

== Personal life ==
Teutsch lives in Philadelphia with his wife Betsy Platkin Teutsch, an artist.
