= Deborah Waxman =

American rabbi

Rabbi Deborah Waxman
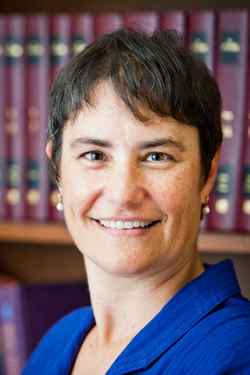
- Deborah Waxman, the president of the Reconstructionist Rabbinical College (RRC) and Jewish Reconstructionist Communities; she was inaugurated as president of both on October 26, 2014
- Born: West Hartford, Connecticut, U.S.
- Education: B.A. in Religion, M.A. in Hebrew Letters, PhD in American Jewish History
- Alma mater: Columbia College, Columbia University; Reconstructionist Rabbinical College; Temple University
- Occupations: President, Reconstructionist Rabbinical College
- Years active: 2014–present

Deborah Waxman is an American rabbi and the president and CEO of Reconstructing Judaism (the merged organization of the Reconstructionist Rabbinical College and Jewish Reconstructionist Communities). Waxman was inaugurated as the president of both on October 26, 2014. The ceremony took place at the National Museum of American Jewish History in Philadelphia. Waxman is believed to be the first woman rabbi and first lesbian to lead a Jewish congregational union, and the first lesbian to lead a Jewish seminary; the Reconstructionist Rabbinical College is both a congregational union and a seminary. She previously served as the vice-president for governance for the Reconstructionist Rabbinical College. In 2015 she was named as one of The Forward 50.

== Scholarship ==
Waxman has focused her scholarly work on American Jewish history. She is a member of the Academic Council of the American Jewish Historical Society. Her topics of research include American Jewish history, Jewish identity and peoplehood, women in American Judaism, and Mordecai Kaplan. She has published articles in academic and Jewish journals and presented at conferences.

As an undergraduate religion major at Columbia College, Waxman began her religious scholarship. She earned a Master of Hebrew Letters from and was ordained as a rabbi by the Reconstructionist Rabbinical College in 1999. She completed a PhD in American Jewish History at Temple University. She also earned a certificate in Jewish Women's Studies from RRC in conjunction with Temple University.

== Reconstructionist movement leadership ==
=== Administrator and strategic planner ===
Waxman has held a leadership role in the Reconstructionist movement since 2003, when she became the Vice President for Governance of the Reconstructionist Rabbinical College (RRC).

From 2006 to 2008 RRC undertook a strategic planning process to serve as a 5-year guide for the organization. Waxman was central in the strategic plan's development. The "Key Issues" addressed by the plan included: demographics of the Jewish community, image and influence, and the educational program. Regarding the plan, Waxman stated:

a Reconstructionist perspective is crucial. Everything we do is informed by the values and ideas of Mordecai M. Kaplan, other members of the "founding" generation, those who came after them, and contemporary Reconstructionist thinkers. That is why developing influential and innovative resources that will let us share those values and ideas with the world is one of the Strategic Plan's highest priorities.

In the "Making Change Happen" section of the plan Waxman explained that the ideas the strategic planning committee considered "most potent" include "the expansiveness and creativity inherent in Kaplan's definition of Judaism as the evolving religious civilization of the Jewish people [and] the sense of both empowerment and responsibility embedded in that concept and in the ensuing mandate that every generation of Jews must reconstruct Judaism for its own time." About the committee's motivation, Waxman said:

We do all this because we know that if we are successful, our graduates will become change agents capable of transmitting RRC's approach to Judaism and religious life, and ultimately making the world a better place. They will foster individual growth and transform institutions, whether they work in synagogues, colleges and universities; hospitals or Jewish communal organizations; or in settings neither we nor they can imagine... Our ultimate goal is transformation writ large—the personal, religious and social transformation of all humanity.

During the fourth year of the five-year plan (2012) the Reconstructionist movement as a whole underwent a restructuring. At that point the Jewish Reconstructionist Federation (JRF)--the union of Reconstructionist congregations—and RRC became one organization and RRC then became the "primary national organization" of the Reconstructionist movement, under the leadership of RRC President Rabbi Dan Ehrenkrantz. Ehrenkrantz explained "our congregations voted to restructure, closing the doors of the Jewish Reconstructionist Federation (JRF) and bringing together most movement activities under one roof at the Reconstructionist Rabbinical College (RRC).

On October 9, 2013, that more broadly structured RRC named Deborah Waxman as its next president, the first to be appointed to lead the new RRC organization. She is believed to be the first woman rabbi to head a joint Jewish congregational union and Jewish seminary. Before she began her presidency on January 1st, 2014, Waxman was "working on completing the merged organization's first-ever strategic plan.... Waxman said the organization's goal is to further engage people involved in Reconstructionist Judaism and to provide an avenue into Jewish life — be it cultural, religious or activist — for anyone who is searching. In the wider American landscape, she views Reconstructionism as a strong voice for a progressive religion that is deeply engaged in social-justice issues."

In addition to her experience in strategic planning, Waxman has written grant proposals that have won support from funders such as the Kresge Foundation, Wexner Foundation and Cummings Foundation and has stewarded major RRC donors.

Waxman is a Zionist, in keeping with the Reconstructionist movement's support for progressive Zionism and the two-state solution.

=== Pulpit rabbi ===
Waxman served as High Holy Days rabbi at Congregation Bet Havarim in Syracuse, New York, for 11 years.

== Personal life ==
Waxman was born and raised in West Hartford, Connecticut. She has two siblings. She was raised a Conservative Jew and was one of the first girls in Connecticut to have a Conservative Bat Mitzvah on a Saturday morning (in 1979). Her father was a traveling salesman and her mother was president of the sisterhood of their synagogue in Bloomfield, Connecticut.

Waxman lives in Elkins Park, in suburban Philadelphia with her partner, Christina Ager, a Jew by choice.

== Bibliography ==
- Deborah Waxman (May 2010). Ethnicity and Faith in American Judaism Reconstructionism as Ideology and Institution, 1935–1959 (Ph.D. thesis). Temple University.

=== Selected publications ===
- Waxman, Deborah (Fall 2010). "Distinctiveness and Universalism: How to Remain Jewish if Jewish Isn't Better" (PDF). Zeek: A Journal of Jewish Thought and Culture. pp. 39–42. Archived from the original (PDF) on 2021-05-11.
- Waxman, Deborah; Fuchs-Kreimer, Nancy (31 January 2012). "The Chosen People? Two Perspectives". Zeek: A Journal of Jewish Thought and Culture. Also available from Reconstructing Judaism and the Berman Jewish Policy Archive.
- Waxman, Deborah (Winter 2012). "Review of the National Museum of American Jewish History, Philadelphia" (PDF). Pennsylvania History: A Journal of Mid-Atlantic Studies. 79 (1): 65–75. doi:10.5325/pennhistory.79.1.0065. S2CID 146143394.
- Waxman, Deborah (2010). "A lady sometimes blows the shofar: Women's religious equality in the postwar reconstructionist movement". In Hasia Diner (ed.). A Jewish Feminine Mystique?: Jewish Women in Postwar America. New Brunswick, NJ: Rutgers University Press. pp. 87–104. ISBN 978-0-8135-4792-3. OCLC 461323820.
- Waxman, Deborah; Norden, Joyce Galpern (September 2009). "The Challenge of Implementing Reconstructionism: Art, Ideology, and the Society for the Advancement of Judaism's Sanctuary Mural" (PDF). American Jewish History. 95 (3): 195–224. doi:10.1353/ajh.2009.a408834.
- Waxman, Deborah (2006). "To Life!: The Four Cups of Feminist Judaism". In Anisfeld, Sharon Cohen (ed.). The Women's Seder Sourcebook: Rituals and Readings for Use at the Passover Seder. Woodstock, VT: Jewish Lights Publishing. pp. 38–40. ISBN 978-1-58023-232-6.
- Waxman, Deborah (Spring 2005). "The Emergence of an Icon: Yahrtzeit Plaques in 20th-Century American Judaism" (PDF). The Reconstructionist. 69 (2): 58–75. Archived from the original (PDF) on 27 October 2021.
- Waxman, Deborah, ed. (2005). Oneg Shabbat: A Weekly Celebration of the Jewish Sabbath (PDF). Wyncote, PA: Hiddur: The Center for Aging and Judaism of the Reconstructionist Rabbinical College.

=== Selected presentations ===
- Panel participant. Mordecai M. Kaplan Reconsidered: The Meaning and Significance of His Legacy for Our Time (2013) at the Association for Jewish Studies Conference
- Panel participant. Reconstructing Religious Authority in a Democratic Context: Early Reconstructionist Approaches and their Contemporary Resonances (2011) at the Association for Jewish Studies Conference
- Cultural Production: The Challenge of Implementing Reconstructionism (2010) at the Association for Jewish Studies Conference
- Jewish Peoplehood and Rugged Individualism: Creating a 'We-Feeling' for American Jews (2008) keynote address at the Super Sunday of Jewish Learning

== See also ==
- Reconstructionist Rabbinical College
- Reconstructionist Judaism
- Mordecai M. Kaplan
