= Simcha Paull Raphael =

Psychotherapist, author, and death awareness educator

- Born: Steven Paull; 1951 (age 74–75)
- Education: Concordia University (BA, (Note: Sir George Williams University merged with Loyola College to create Concordia University in 1974.) MA, History and Philosophy of Religion); California Institute of Integral Studies (PhD, Psychology)
- Occupations: Psychotherapist, writer, death awareness educator
- Notable work: Jewish Views of the Afterlife
- Spouse: Geela Rayzel Raphael
- Website: simcharaphael.com

Simcha Paull Raphael (born 1951) is a Canadian psychotherapist, death awareness educator, and writer. He is the founder of the Da'at Institute for Death Awareness, Advocacy, and Training, and author of the book Jewish Views of the Afterlife, a synthesis of premodern mystical Jewish philosophy with postmodern concepts of transpersonal psychology, consciousness research, and near-death studies. This book is considered to be an important work of scholarship in the fields of thanatology and religious studies, which has helped shift the view that Judaism doesn't have beliefs in the afterlife.

== Early life and education ==
Raphael was born Steven Paull in 1951 and grew up in Montreal, the son of Rose and Harold Paull. He was educated in Hebrew day schools at United Talmud Torahs of Montreal. He received a Bachelor of Arts from Sir George Williams University, a Master of Arts from Concordia University, a doctorate in Psychology from the California Institute of Integral Studies, and was ordained as a Rabbi rabbinic pastor by Rabbi Zalman Schachter-Shalomi.

Raphael's early encounters with death deeply impacted him, including the loss of his grandmother when he was four and two close friends in his early 20s, one of whom was his best friend who died in a car accident in 1973. These losses spurred his curiosity about Jewish perspectives on life after death. He found that Jewish tradition generally offered minimal support for confronting death, with most Jewish belief emphasizing life over the hereafter and many assuming Judaism didn't have a concept of an afterlife. Convinced that Jews wanted something different, he decided to write a book delving into non-rationalistic explanations from Jewish tradition.

== Jewish Views of the Afterlife ==
Raphael spent 15 years researching and writing Jewish Views of the Afterlife, a comprehensive exploration of Jewish beliefs about life after death, challenging the notion that Judaism lacks such traditions. The book spans 4,000 years of Jewish thought, drawing from the Bible, Apocrypha, rabbinic teachings, medieval philosophy, legends, and mystical traditions like the Kabbalah and Hasidism. It details the evolution of Jewish eschatology from early Biblical ideas of Sheol to complex medieval beliefs in postmortem judgment, heaven, hell, and resurrection in the World to Come, highlighting how these beliefs were obscured in modern times by rationalism and the aftermath of the Holocaust. He synthesizes these ancient views with modern disciplines such as transpersonal psychology and near-death studies, showing parallels between Jewish mystical traditions and contemporary near-death experience (NDE) accounts. His book brought greater awareness that Jewish culture has maintained some form of continuity for centuries and encompasses a wide range of perspectives on death. It is currently in its third edition.

Raphael proposes that understanding and embracing these traditions can transform Jewish experiences of death and mourning, offering an antidote to the grief and trauma of events like the Holocaust. The book ultimately positions Judaism as a meaningful source of insight into life after death, aligning it with global religious and near-death perspectives. In his "Kabbalistic-Psychological" model of afterlife, he divides existence into spiritual, emotional, mental, and physical realms with specific rituals for each.

== Career ==
Raphael co-founded a bereavement-support program at a Jewish funeral home in Toronto and was executive director of The Benjamin Institute, which provides education and support in areas related to grief, bereavement, and loss. In 1989, he moved to Philadelphia. He was an associate professor in the department of Jewish studies at Temple University (2007–2014), spiritual director at the Reconstructionist Rabbinical College (1999–2009), and an adjunct professor of religion and theology at La Salle University. Throughout this time he has worked a bereavement counselor, psychotherapist, and death educator.

Raphael travels the country giving lectures and workshops about Jewish teachings of the afterlife, often to people dealing with aging or dying parents or their own mortality. Acknowledging that death is unsettling, he insists on the need for open discussions about it. He highlights historical beliefs in the soul's continuity, particularly within Kabbalistic traditions, stressing the importance of understanding the soul's nature to grasp what happens after death. Additionally, he emphasizes discussing death and near-death experiences to help people feel less alone and to maintain emotional connections with those who have passed. He notes it's important to focus on the spiritual needs of the mourners and not just the rituals of death and dying, which is where rabbis often focus. He has invited people to attend "death cafes" in the Philadelphia area, a place where people can come to talk about death directly.

In 2014 he founded the Da'at Institute for Death Awareness, Advocacy, and Training, which provides transpersonal psychotherapy, individual and group bereavement counseling, spiritual direction, pastoral care, and hospice support. He applies his understanding of Jewish teachings of the soul's afterlife journey in the hopes of making this knowledge relevant to healing and emphasizes the importance of being with people in their grief. He also provides counseling and training for rabbis and health professionals dealing with issues around death.

== Personal life ==
Raphael is married to Rabbi Geela Rayzel Raphael, who was ordained in the Reconstructionist movement. He and his wife created their surname by combining their birth surnames Robinson (hers) and Paull (his). In 1988 they received an award for excellence in programming for their contributions to developing a death awareness program in Toronto.

== Bibliography ==
- Raphael, Simcha Paull (2019). Jewish Views of the Afterlife (3rd ed.). Rowman & Littlefield. ISBN 9781538103463. Second edition (2009) available to borrow on archive.org
- Raphael, Simcha Paull (2015). The Grief Journey and the Afterlife: Jewish Pastoral Care for Bereavement. Albion-Andalus. ISBN 9780692360545.
- Raphael, Simcha Paull (2015). Living and Dying in Ancient Times: Death, Burial, and Mourning in Biblical Tradition. Albion-Andalus. ISBN 9780692495568.
- Raphael, Simcha Paull (2016). May the Angels Carry You: Jewish Prayers and Meditations for the Deathbed. Albion-Andalus. ISBN 9780692765609.
- Raphael, Simcha Paull (2019). Echoes from the Ashes: Holocaust Poems of Life, Death and Re-Birth. Albion-Andalus. ISBN 9781733658959.
- Friedman, Dayle A; Levin, David; Raphael, Simcha Paull, eds. (2021). Jewish End-of-Life Care in a Virtual Age: Our Traditions Reimagined. Albion-Andalus Books. ISBN 9781734875065.
- Raphael, Simcha Paull (2024). Musings With The Angel Of Death: Poems of Love, Life and Longing. Albion-Andalus. ISBN 9781953220370.
- Raphael, Simcha Paull (2025). Spirits, Ghosts and Dybbuks: Afterife Journeys in Yiddish Lore. Albion-Andalus. ISBN 978-1953220486.
