= Mordechai Liebling =

American rabbi, educator and activist

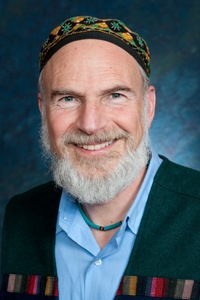
- Born: Marvin Liebling; October 29, 1948 (age 76); Brooklyn, New York, U.S.
- Education: Cornell University (BA); Brandeis University (MA); Reconstructionist Rabbinical College
- Occupation: Rabbi
- Spouses: Devora Bartnoff (died 1997) Lynne Iser (m. 1998)
- Children: 5
- Website: Rabbi Mordechai Liebling

Mordechai Eliyahu Liebling (born October 29, 1948) is a rabbi, educator, and activist who has led Jewish and interfaith organizations dedicated to social justice missions. He founded the Social Justice Organizing Program at the Reconstructionist Rabbinical College (RRC) to provide student rabbis training for engaging in the work of tikkun olam, Hebrew for "repair of the world".

== Early life and education ==
Liebling was born in Brooklyn, New York October 29, 1948. His parents were Holocaust survivors. He has a Bachelor of Arts degree in government from Cornell University and Master of Arts in the history of American civilization, specializing in American progressive movements from Brandeis University. He began his career working as a community organizer, and was involved in radical political activism. One day while too sick to work, Liebling read an essay by Mordecai Kaplan, founder of Reconstructionism, which rejects supernaturalism and patriarchy while promoting equality and social justice. This essay profoundly resonated with Liebling, aligning with his own beliefs and marking a transformative moment in his life. He realized he'd be most effective as an agent for social change working in the Jewish community and decided to enroll in the Reconstructionist Rabbinical College (RRC), graduating in 1985.

== Career ==
After graduating from rabbinical school, Liebling became the executive director of the Jewish Reconstructionist Federation, which is now part of Reconstructing Judaism, serving for 12 years before stepping down in 1998 to spend more time with his family after his wife died, staying on two days a week as a senior consultant. In this role, Liebling served as a congregational consultant, assisting fledgling Reconstructionist synagogues in their establishment, guiding new congregations toward affiliation with the Reconstructionist movement, conducting board trainings, and supporting congregations facing difficulties. Two years later he became Torah of Money Director at The Shefa Fund helping people apply Jewish values to how they spend, invest and donate their money. When The Shefa Fund and Jewish Fund for Justice merged in 2006 to become Jewish Funds for Justice, Liebling became its vice president for programs helping to mobilize financial resources, train leaders, and conduct synagogue-based community organizing to support social justice causes.

In 2010 he founded the Social Justice Organizing Program at the Reconstructionist Rabbinical College in order to educate rabbinical students on systems of power and resources with an emphasis on transformative change, integrating their passion for justice with Judaism. Because of this program and courses taught by Jewish Theological Seminary and Hebrew Union College-Jewish Institute of Religion, as of 2015 about 200 rabbis had been trained in community organizing work.

He traveled to Ferguson, Missouri to protest the killing of Michael Brown, and to Charlottesville, Virginia to serve as a moral witness at the Unite the Right rally. He was arrested protesting the Keystone pipeline at the federal building in Philadelphia.

Liebling was a member of the Conference of Presidents of Major American Jewish Organizations for 12 years. He has served on the boards of various national and international non-profit organizations including the Faith and Politics Institute and The Shalom Center, and was a founding board member of Rabbis for Human Rights-North America (now T'ruah). He was honored in 2023 at the T'ruah gala. He serves as Senior Advisor at Power Interfaith, the largest faith-based grass roots organizing network in Pennsylvania.

== Personal life ==
He was married to Rabbi Devora Bartnoff (July 3, 1952 – April 30, 1997), who died age 44 after a two-year struggle with breast cancer. He married Lynne Iser in December 1998. Liebling and Iser conduct workshops based on the teachings of environmentalist Joanna Macy, focusing on acknowledging the painful realities of the world as a crucial step in fostering intergenerational understanding and effective organizing.

His family was the subject of the documentary film Praying with Lior, which followed his child Lior who has Down syndrome on his path to Bar Mitzvah.

== Selected publications ==
- Liebling, Mordechai (October 7, 2018) [October 2001]. "Tzedakah Collectives". ejewishphilanthropy.com. Sh'ma.
- Liebling, Mordechai (Fall 2003). "Making Synagogues Vessels of Tikkun Olam" (PDF). The Reconstructionist. 68 (1): 5–16.
- Liebling, Mordechai (March 2005). "Money in Synagogues" (PDF). Sh’ma. Archived from the original (PDF) on July 8, 2008.
- Liebling, Mordechai (Spring 2006). "The First Jewish Shareholder Activist Group" (PDF). Green Money Journal. 14 (3). Archived from the original (PDF) on July 8, 2008.
- Liebling, Mordechai (December 29, 2010). "Beyond Excess: Finding Better Rewards for Our Leaders". The Forward.
