= Tzedek Chicago =

Synagogue in Chicago

Religion
- Affiliation: Judaism
- Rite: (Progressive Judaism)
- Ecclesiastical or organisational status: Synagogue
- Leadership: Rabbi Sasha Perry
- Status: Active

Location
- Country: United States

Architecture
- Established: 2015 (as a congregation)

Website
- tzedekchicago.org

Tzedek Chicago is a Progressive Jewish congregation and synagogue, located in Chicago, Illinois, in the United States. It is one of the first synagogues in the United States to officially declare itself anti-Zionist.

The congregation was founded by Rabbi Brant Rosen and is currently led by Rabbi Sasha Perry. While some in-person events are held in venues around Chicago, most of the synagogue's services and programs, including Friday Shabbat services, are held online as of 2024.

== History ==
Tzedek Chicago was founded in 2015 in Lincoln Square by the former Reconstructionist Rabbi Brant Rosen as a non-Zionist synagogue. The synagogue is dedicated to social justice, universalism, and anti-racism. Many members are Millennials who feel unrepresented elsewhere in the Jewish community.

The synagogue has around 450 members and 375 member families.

== Anti-Zionist advocacy ==
In March 2022, Tzedek Chicago shifted from non-Zionism to anti-Zionism by declaring anti-Zionism to be a "core value." Rabbi Rosen stated that "Jews have a moral precept of pursuing justice and standing in solidarity with the oppressed," naming anti-Zionism as part of that effort by standing in solidarity with Palestinians. 72% of Tzedek Chicago's membership agreed with the move to declare the congregation anti-Zionist, with the rest of the members choosing to accept the decision and remain part of the congregation. A small number of Jews joined the synagogue after the decision was made to become anti-Zionist. Outside of anti-Zionist Hasidic sects such as the Satmar and a handful of non-Zionist progressive synagogues, very few synagogues in the United States openly distance themselves from the Zionist movement.

While recognizing the importance of the Land of Israel to Jewish liturgy, tradition, and identity, the synagogue objects to the "fusing of Judaism with political nationalism," "openly acknowledging that the creation of an ethnic Jewish nation state in historic Palestine resulted in an injustice against its indigenous people – an injustice that continues to this day."

Tzedek's decision was criticised by many Zionist, pro-Israel Jewish groups in Chicago. They are not listed on the directory of synagogues maintained by Chicago's Jewish United Fund, a historically Zionist organization. The Zionist Organization of America's Morton Klein and Elizabeth A. Berney claimed that Tzedek Chicago is "an offshoot of Jewish Voice for Peace (JVP) that distorts and omits the essence of Judaism."
