= Reconstructionist Rabbinical Association =

Professional association of rabbis

The Reconstructionist Rabbinical Association (RRA), founded in 1974, is the professional association of rabbis affiliated with Reconstructionist Judaism. It has approximately 450 members, most of whom are graduates of the Reconstructionist Rabbinical College (RRC) in Wyncote, Pennsylvania, near Philadelphia. The RRA is a member of a number of national coalitions including the Conference of Presidents of Major American Jewish Organizations. Its first director was Rabbi Richard Hirsh who was hired in 1984 to work five hours/week when he was dean of admissions at RRC.

From 1987 to 1989, Rabbi Joy Levitt was the first female president of the RRA.

In 2007, Rabbi Toba Spitzer became the first openly lesbian or gay person chosen to head a rabbinical association in the United States when she was elected president of the RRA.

== Past presidents ==
- Rabbi David Brusin (RRC '74) (1974–1976)
- Rabbi Arnold Rachlis (RRC '75) (1976–1978)
- Rabbi Dennis C. Sasso (RRC '74) (1978–1980)
- Rabbi Elliot Skiddell (RRC '80) (1980–1983)
- Rabbi Steven Sager (RRC '78) (1983–1985)
- Rabbi Ira Schiffer (RRC '81) (1985–1987)
- Rabbi Joy Levitt (RRC '81) (1987–1989)
- Rabbi Sandy Eisenberg Sasso (RRC '74) (1989–1991)
- Rabbi Lee Friedlander (RRC '75) (1991–1993)
- Rabbi Ron Aigen (RRC '76) (1993–1995)
- Rabbi Michael Cohen (RRC '90) (1995–1996)
- Rabbi Barbara Penzner (RRC '87) (1996–1999)
- Rabbi Dan Ehrenkrantz (RRC '89) )1999–2001)
- Rabbi Nancy Fuchs Kreimer (RRC '82) (2001–2003)
- Rabbi Amy Small (RRC '87) (2003–2005)
- Rabbi Brant Rosen (RRC '92) (2005–2007)
- Rabbi Toba Spitzer (RRC '97) (2007–2009)
- Rabbi Yael Ridberg (RRC '97) (2009–2011)
- Rabbi Fredi Cooper (RRC '00) (2011–2013)
- Rabbi Jason Klein (RRC '02) (2013–2015)
- Rabbi Nina H. Mandel (RRC '03) (2015–2017)
- Rabbi Elliott Tepperman (RRC '02) (2020–2022)
- Rabbi James Greene (RRC '08) (2022–2024)

== See also ==
- Reconstructionist Rabbinical College
- Reconstructionist Judaism
