= Toba Spitzer =

American rabbi and activist

Toba Spitzer is an American rabbi, writer, and activist. She is the first openly lesbian or gay rabbi to head a rabbinical organization in the United States.

== Early life and education ==
Toba Spitzer is a native of Chevy Chase, Maryland, and grew up in a non-observant Jewish family. However, as a child her family attended a havurah in the D.C. area. She studied at Harvard University graduating in 1986, and then spent a year in Jaffa, Israel, working for Friendship's Way, an after-school program for Jewish and Arab students. There, she taught Hebrew and Arabic and assisted in opening a community center. Upon returning to the U.S. she worked as a political activist in Washington, DC registering young people to vote and working for the Jewish Peace Lobby, where she helped to build a Jewish advocacy group promoting a two-state solution to the Israeli-Palestinian conflict. Inspired by Dr. Martin Luther King Jr., she realized she wanted her activism to be anchored in religion and in 1992 enrolled in the Reconstructionist Rabbinical College. When she entered rabbinical school she was warned that "out" graduates would not able to find a job. Rabbi Sharon Kleinbaum, who was out when she graduated in 1990, shared that she could not find a pulpit job upon graduating. However, when Spitzer's class graduated in 1997, three "out" rabbis including two lesbians and one gay man, were hired by congregations that had been through a workshop series created by the Reconstructionist movement designed to help congregations be welcoming to gay and lesbian rabbis.

== Career ==
Since 1997 Spitzer has served as the rabbi of Congregation Dorshei Tzedek in West Newton, Massachusetts. At the time the congregation had 37 households, most of whom were straight couples who lived in Newton. In 2012 it had 190 households with a more diverse membership including gays and lesbians, singles and single parents. Given members were also economically diverse, the synagogue devised a dues structure where everyone was asked to pay a minimum amount and those with more means asked to pay an additional 0.09-1.6% of their income. By 2024, the synagogue had grown to approximately 260 households.

In 2007, she was elected to a two-year term as president of the Reconstructionist Rabbinical Association, becoming the first openly gay rabbi to lead any national rabbinical association. She praised her denomination for its courage and tolerance and believed this appointment contributed to her being named one of the 50 most influential rabbis in the United States by Newsweek in 2007 and 2008. She was also included on the Forward lists Forward 50 (2007) and 50 Female Rabbis Who Are Making A Difference (2010).

For Spitzer, her rabbinate is an extension of her commitment to peace and justice. She is known for her Israeli-Palestinian peace efforts and for her economic justice work with groups such as the Jewish Funds for Justice (now Bend the Arc). She has served as treasurer of Truah: the Rabbinic Call for Human Rights, on the advisory board of J Street and co-chaired the Boston chapter of the J Street Rabbinic Cabinet. In 2015, she received the "Elizabeth Wyner Mark Peace Award" from Americans for Peace Now, and in 2024 was honored with the "Rabbinic Human Rights Hero Award" from Truah. In April 2024 she was part of a group of about 30 rabbis with Rabbis for Ceasefire trying to take food supplies into Gaza who were stopped near the Gaza-Israel border. Spitzer noted that Jewish and Palestinian liberation are interconnected.

Spitzer has written essays and sermons, some of which are on the Reconstructing Judaism and Congregation Dorshei Tzedek websites. She is the author of the book God Is Here: Reimagining the Divine (2022). After being contacted by literary agents starting in 2007 who had read her sermons online and thought there was potential for a book, she met with them in 2011 and realized they wanted her to write a book about God. God is Here aims to make the divine accessible through metaphors from nature, such as water, fire, and rock. It emphasizes practical spiritual practices and a re-envisioned language for God, in order to nourish and guide individuals on their spiritual journeys. By blending personal narratives with insights from Jewish tradition and contemporary sources, it seeks to provide multiple pathways to experience and connect with the divine.
