= Brant Rosen =

American rabbi and blogger (born 1963)

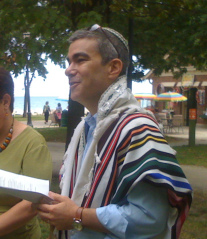
- Rosen in 2009

Personal life
- Born: February 22, 1963 (age 63)
- Education: University of California, Los Angeles; Reconstructionist Rabbinical College

Religious life
- Religion: Judaism
- Denomination: Reconstructionist

Jewish leader
- Position: Rabbi
- Synagogue: Tzedek Chicago

Brant Rosen (born February 22, 1963) is an American rabbi and blogger, known for his pro-Palestinian activism.

== Biography ==
Rosen is a native of Los Angeles, California. He is a graduate of the University of California, Los Angeles and the Reconstructionist Rabbinical College.

== Career and activism ==
Rosen is the rabbi of Tzedek Chicago, an anti-Zionist synagogue he founded in August 2015. Rosen previously served as the rabbi of the Jewish Reconstructionist Congregation in Evanston, Illinois from 1998 to 2014, when he resigned, citing increasing tension over his Palestine solidarity activism. After leaving JRC, Rosen became the Midwest Regional Director of the American Friends Service Committee, a Quaker organization. In 2019, he left AFSC to serve Tzedek Chicago as its full time rabbi.

Rosen is a former president of the Reconstructionist Rabbinical Association and is the co-founder and co-chairperson of the Jewish Voice for Peace Rabbinical Council. In 2009, he co-founded the Jewish Fast for Gaza, or Ta'anit Tzedek with Rabbi Brian Walt. Under his leadership, the Jewish Reconstructionist Congregation built their new building with an environmentally sustainable design in 2008, becoming the first house of worship to ever receive a Platinum rating by the U.S. Green Building Council. He was the recipient of Chicago Magazine's Green Award for his environmental leadership in 2009.

== Writing ==
Rosen's blog Shalom Rav explores "the intersection between Judaism and social justice, with a particular emphasis on Israel/Palestine." In 2012, Just World Books published his book, Wrestling in the Daylight: A Rabbi's Path to Palestinian Solidarity, which featured his posts and numerous reader comments from Shalom Rav. Rosen is also the author of the blog Yedid Nefesh, where he posts his poetry and thoughts on Judaism and spirituality. In 2018, Tzedek Chicago published his chapbook of original prayers, Songs After the Revolution: New Jewish Liturgy. He has contributed op-eds to The Huffington Post, Chicago Tribune, The Forward, Truthout, The Jewish Telegraphic Agency, and other media outlets.

== Awards ==
In 2008, Rosen was named one of the Top 25 Pulpit Rabbis in America by Newsweek magazine. In 2009 he was awarded the "Partner in Justice" Award by Avodah: The Jewish Service Corps and he received the "Inspiration for Hope Award" by the American Friends Service Committee in 2010 for his social justice activism in the Middle East.
