= Lori Hope Lefkovitz =

- Born: May 6, 1956 (age 70)
- Title: Ruderman Professor of Jewish Studies
- Children: 2

Academic background
- Education: Brandeis University; Brown University (M.A., PhD)
- Thesis: The Character of Beauty: Innovation and Tradition in the Nineteenth-Century English Novel (1984)

Academic work
- Discipline: Jewish studies
- Institutions: Northeastern University

Lori Hope Lefkovitz (born May 6, 1956) is an American Jewish studies academic. She works at Northeastern University, where she serves as the Ruderman Professor of Jewish Studies and directs the Jewish Studies Program. She is the founding director of Kolot: The Center for Jewish Women and Gender Studies, the first such center at a rabbinical seminary.

== Biography ==
=== Teaching and academia ===
A graduate of Brandeis University, Lefkovitz received her M.A. and Ph.D. in English from Brown University and was a recipient of a Woodrow Wilson dissertation fellowship in women's studies, a Golda Meir post-doctoral fellowship at Hebrew University, a post-doctoral fellowship at the Institute of the Philadelphia Association for Psychoanalysis, and in 2004, a Fulbright Professorship at Hebrew University. She was previously an associate professor at Kenyon College.

Among the courses she teaches or has taught at RRC are: Literary Approaches to Bible; Bible and the Feminist Imagination; Writing for the Rabbinate; Gender and Judaism; Queering Jewish Studies; Jewish Literature.

Lefkovitz serves on editorial and professional boards and lectures widely to academic and Jewish audiences.

=== Feminism ===
Lefkovitz has expressed interest in reviving or reclaiming Jewish women's folk practices and holidays.

Since Kolot's founding in 1996, Lefkovitz has convened a landmark conference, together with the Renfrew Center, on Food, Body Image & Judaism, which examined eating disorders; established the Rosh Hodesh: "It's a girl thing!" program, that has popularly been adopted across the country; and, together with Ma'yan, co-founded Ritualwell.org, a website for contemporary Jewish ritual now maintained exclusively by Kolot, with Lefkovitz as its executive editor. Through a joint initiative, she established a program with Temple University awarding a certificate in Jewish Women's Studies.

=== Personal life ===
She is married to Rabbi Leonard Gordon, spiritual leader of Bnai Tikvah, in Canton MA, with whom she has two daughters.

== Publications ==
Widely published in the fields of literature, critical theory, and Jewish Women's Studies, her articles, book chapters, and reviews have appeared in The Women's Passover Companion; Lilith; Sh'ma Magazine; The Reconstructionist; Hebrew University Studies in Literature and the Arts; Gender and Judaism; Lifecycles; Kerem; A Mensch Among Men; Sister to Sister; and Contemporary Critical Theory.

=== Books ===
- The Character of Beauty in the Victorian Novel (UMI Research Press, 1987)
- Lefkovitz, Lori Hope (2010). In Scripture: the first stories of Jewish sexual identities. Lanham, MD: Rowman & Littlefield Publishers, Inc. ISBN 978-0-7425-4704-9.

==== As editor ====
- Lefkovitz, Lori Hope, ed. (1997). Textual bodies: changing boundaries of literary representation. The Body in Culture, History, and Religion. Albany, NY: State University of New York Press. ISBN 978-0-7914-3162-7.
- Epstein, Julia; Lefkovitz, Lori Hope, eds. (2001). Shaping Losses: Cultural Memory and the Holocaust. Urbana: University of Illinois Press. ISBN 978-0-252-06949-9.

==== Chapters ====
- Lefkovitz, Lori Hope (2010-05-01). ""Demand a Speaking Part!": The Character of the Jewish Father". In Aron, Lewis; Henik, Libby (eds.). Answering a Question with a Question: Contemporary Psychoanalysis and Jewish Thought. Academic Studies Press. pp. 289–312. doi:10.1515/9781618111081-013. ISBN 978-1-61811-108-1.
- Lefkovitz, Lori (2014-12-05). "6. Not a man: Joseph and the character of masculinity in Judaism and Islam". In Kashani-Sabet, Firoozeh; Wenger, Beth S. (eds.). Gender in Judaism and Islam: Common Lives, Uncommon Heritage. New York University Press. pp. 155–180. doi:10.18574/nyu/9781479823758.003.0010. ISBN 978-1-4798-2375-8.
- Epstein, Julia; Lefkovitz, Lori Hope (2020-02-26). "Invisible Ink: The Limits of Recovery". In Hofmann, Bettina; Reuter, Ursula (eds.). Translated Memories: Transgenerational Perspectives on the Holocaust. Rowman & Littlefield. ISBN 978-1-7936-0607-5.
- Lefkovitz, Lori Hope (2020-12-31). "Forty. Between Beast and Angel: The Queer, Fabulous Self: Parashat Balak (Numbers 22:2–25:10)". In Drinkwater, Gregg; Lesser, Joshua (eds.). Torah Queeries. New York University Press. pp. 212–215. doi:10.18574/nyu/9780814720127.003.0040. ISBN 978-0-8147-8524-9.

=== Articles ===
- Lefkovitz, Lori (1987). "Delicate Beauty Goes out: "Adam Bede's" Transgressive Heroines". The Kenyon Review. 9 (3): 84–96. ISSN 0163-075X. JSTOR 4335844.
- Lefkovitz, Lori Hope (1997). "Inherited Holocaust Memory and the Ethics of Ventriloquism". The Kenyon Review.
- Lefkovitz, Lori Hope (2002). "Passing as a Man: Narratives of Jewish Gender Performance". Narrative. 10 (1): 91–103. ISSN 1063-3685. JSTOR 20107274.
- Lefkovitz, Lori; Shapiro, Rona (2005). "Ritualwell.Org–Loading the Virtual Canon, or: The Politics and Aesthetics of Jewish Women's Spirituality". Nashim: A Journal of Jewish Women's Studies & Gender Issues (9): 101–125. ISSN 0793-8934. JSTOR 40326620.
- Lefkovitz, Lori Hope (2006). "Reflections on the Future of Jewish Feminism and Jewish Feminist Scholarship". Nashim: A Journal of Jewish Women's Studies & Gender Issues. 10 (1): 218–224. doi:10.1353/nsh.2005.0023. ISSN 1565-5288.
- Lefkovitz, Lori (April 2009). ""Does it Hurt Shirley to Learn to Speak Up?": Tevye's New World Legacy in the Jewish Daughter's Father". Bridges: A Jewish Feminist Journal. 14 (1): 97–103. doi:10.2979/BRI.2009.14.1.97. ISSN 1046-8358.
- Lefkovitz, Lori Hope (June 2011). "The Genesis of Gender Transgression". Jewish Quarterly Review. 101 (3): 408–419. doi:10.1353/jqr.2011.0028. ISSN 1553-0604.
- Lefkovitz, Lori; Shneer, David; Tenenbaum, Shelly (June 2014). "The Challenge of Interdisciplinarity: A Conversation about Introductory Courses to Jewish Studies". Shofar: An Interdisciplinary Journal of Jewish Studies. 32 (4): 35–44. doi:10.1353/sho.2014.0055. ISSN 1534-5165.
