= Ritualwell =

Jewish website

- Website type: religion, social, Jewish
- Available in: English
- Owner: Reconstructionist Rabbinical College
- Editor: Rabbi Roni Handler
- Website: ritualwell.org
- Launched: 2001
- Current status: Active

Ritualwell is a website that allows users to find, create and share Jewish rituals. It was initially launched in 2001 and was nominated for a Webby Award in the Religion & Spirituality category in 2003. The site was redesigned and relaunched in 2005. It seeks to "increase the number of rituals available for holidays, Shabbat and traditional lifecycle events" and "to acknowledge important moments in life that have been neglected, such as menstruation, miscarriage and menopause."

== Approach ==
"Chapter 1 verse 1 of Pirkei Avot (the Ethics of the Fathers) reminds us to 'build a fence around the Torah.' But what if that fence had a gate in it? This is just what the creators of ritualwell.org are working on... The site includes new spins on traditional rituals... [that] take language into consideration... [and the site] works very hard to be inclusive, open and Jewishly relevant."

Ritualwell aims to "promote a democratic Judaism where everyone is welcome to submit content and join the conversation." Earlier prayer and ritual were committed to paper and published in books. Ritualwell seeks to leverage the fluid, changing and democratic nature of the internet. While its roots are in the feminist movement, Ritualwell attempts to be broadly inclusive while also seeking to make contemporary feminist Jewish liturgy and rituals widely available.

The name Ritualwell references a Jewish story of endless water available in the desert. The midrash of Miriam's well "is a rabbinic legend that tells of a miraculous well that accompanied the Israelites during their 40 years in the desert at the Exodus from Egypt". Though Miriam is closely associated with Jewish feminism, Ritualwell tries to "expand the use of ritual in daily life, to sanctify all life changes for men, women and children." The story of Miram's well is linked to a late 20th century feminist addition to the traditional seder plate; some seders (including the original Women's Seder, but not limited to women-only seders) now set out a cup for the prophet Miriam as well as the traditional cup for the prophet Elijah, sometimes accompanied by a ritual to honor Miriam. Miriam's cup originated in the 1980s in a Boston Rosh Chodesh group; it was invented by Stephanie Loo, who filled it with mayim hayim (living waters) and used it in a feminist ceremony of guided meditation.

=== Traditional rituals ===
Ritualwell includes information on traditional Jewish rituals such as attending the mikvah, Counting the Omer, and marrying. It offers a variety of new approaches to traditional rituals such as marriage (with rituals for same sex weddings and second marriages), baby naming, and the Passover seder.

Rituals are reshaped by people who want Judaism in their lives but do not feel comfortable with some aspect of the traditional ritual. Current Ritualwell editor Rabbi Roni Handler explains "Even if they do not have a regular spiritual practice, couples view their wedding as a microcosm of the home they are creating together... [they] aren't looking at marriage as a business transaction as it was once understood... They want the [ritual] to represent their commitment to each other." Since traditional Jewish weddings include a large number of different rituals, Ritualwell includes betrothal blessings, tisches, and other elements of the wedding.

=== New rituals ===
The site offers newly created rituals to mark various points in contemporary life such as a child beginning kindergarten, getting a driver's license or leaving for college. Other new rituals include retiring from work, suffering a miscarriage, surviving cancer, and the separation of a marriage.

== Informing contemporary ritual ==
Since its founding in 2001 Ritualwell has regularly been cited as a source for material on Jewish ritual practice. Books, websites and blogs all refer to Ritualwell and recommend it as a resource.

=== Books ===
- Open it Up!: Integrating the Arts Into Jewish Education (2006) cites Ritualwell as a source for inspiration for Passover projects.
- The Women's Seder Sourcebook: Rituals and Readings for Use at the Passover Seder (2006) discusses Ritualwell as a source for seder rituals and ideas.
- Celebrating the Jewish Year: The Fall Holidays: Rosh Hashanah, Yom Kippur, Sukkot (2007) refers to Ritualwell in discussion of Rosh Hashanah and Simchat Torah.
- Teaching the Holocaust (2007) references Ritualwell as a resource for creating a Yom HaShoah service for students.
- Women Remaking American Judaism (2007) discusses the orange on the seder plate and cites Ritualwell as a source for "new ritual."
- The Torah commentary book Torah Queeries (2009) includes a chapter on each of the 54 weekly Torah portions. The chapter on Parashat Lech Lecha (Genesis 12:1-17:27) refers to two different rituals from Ritualwell while discussing transformation and covenants.
- The Creative Jewish Wedding Book (2009) repeatedly mentions Ritualwell as a source for material to use when planning a Jewish wedding.
- Inventing Jewish Ritual (2010) calls Ritualwell one of "two trustworthy Web sites" for learning about new Jewish rituals and refers to the site throughout the book as a source for material.
- Bioethics in a Cultural Context: Philosophy, Religion, History, Politics (2011) cites Ritualwell in a discussion of the Jewish position on Assisted reproductive technologies (ART).
- A Jew's Best Friend?: The Image of the Dog Throughout Jewish History (2013) mentions a "Blessing of the Animals" ritual found on Ritualwell.

=== Websites and blogs ===
The following is a sample of websites and blogs that reference Ritualwell. This list is not comprehensive.

- Hillel, the largest Jewish campus organization in the world, advises students wishing to start a Rosh Chodesh group to rely on the "excellent discussion" in an article on Ritualwell.
- Congregation Netivot Shalom recommends Ritualwell as a resource for people planning marriage and commitment ceremonies and b'nai mitzvah, people converting to Judaism, and for people grieving a loss.
- Omerharvest, a website focused on the annual Counting the Omer recommends the "wealth of resources" on Ritualwell.
- Rabbi Sarah Tasman discussed using a ritual from Ritualwell on her blog (2013).
- The Jewish Baby Network cites Ritualwell as a resource on its "blessings and rituals" page.
- Rabbi Margaret Frisch Klein references Ritualwell in posts about teaching children to pray, bat mitzvahs, and the power of ritual (2013).
- The Jewish Women's Center of Pittsburgh recommends Ritualwell as a "website of value" to Jewish women.

== History and relationship to Jewish feminism ==
During the 1960s and 70s, Jewish women fought for egalitarian communities and for the opportunities to take on the same religious roles as Jewish men. They also identified a need for new Jewish rituals that would more effectively meet their own needs. The rituals created during this time added feminist layers onto pre-existing rituals. Feminist Passover seders added women's voices to the story of the Jewish people and also provided a home for Jewish women who had become alienated from their former Jewish communities. New rituals were created to mark unique moments in the lives of girls and women.

Lori Lefkovitz and Eve Landau launched Ritualwell in 2001 with the purpose of making "contemporary feminist Jewish liturgy and rituals broadly accessible." Lefkovitz was working in her role as the founding director of Kolot: Center for Jewish Women's and Gender Studies at the Reconstructionist Rabbinical College (RRC) and Landau was director of Ma'yan, the Jewish Women's Project. Their organizations were resources for people interested in feminist and innovative Jewish ritual.

Lefkovitz stated "history shows us that Jewish ritual and liturgical practices were once more fluid than they later became. It seems to me that the printing press froze our words and practices, and I am convinced the Internet is in the process of defrosting [them]."

The site was nominated for a Webby award in the religion and ritual category in 2003.

In 2005 Lefkovitz and Shapiro published a scholarly article in Nashim discussing the creation of Ritualwell and the difficulty of creating a site that was feminist while still being accessible to a broad spectrum of Jews (from unaffiliated to Orthodox). They "wanted to provide a resource equally valuable to a traditional rabbi in the big city and to a Jewish family remote from many Jewish resources" with a primary commitment to "sanctifying life occasions and holidays" through the lens of Judaism and egalitarianism. Issues they struggled with included:

- The gendered nature of Hebrew and traditional Jewish prayer that "classically references both God and the normative Jew with masculine pronouns."
- The use of the word "feminist" appeared to discourage participation by "some of [their] targeted audience."
- The inclusion of rituals intended to mark milestones in the lives of boys and men because "parents who had created beautiful new ceremonies for their baby girls now needed to make the celebrations of their sons' births as meaningful as those for their daughters.
- The question of whether new rituals "resonate[d] with Jewish tradition... utilize[d] Jewish symbols in ways appropriate to them... make use of traditional prayers or texts in innovative ways that remain[ed] true to their essence... [and felt] Jewish?"

In 2005 RRC became the sole publisher of Ritualwell and launched a redesigned website. Rabbi Roni Handler, the current editor of Ritualwell.org, started in that role in 2007.

== See also ==
- Reconstructionist Judaism
- Reconstructionist Rabbinical College
