= Pennsylvania Route 296 =

State highway in Wayne County, Pennsylvania, US

Pennsylvania Route 296

Route information
- Maintained by PennDOT
- Length: 16.177 mi (26.034 km)

Major junctions
- South end: PA 191 in Lake Ariel
- PA 196 in Lake Township; US 6 in Waymart
- North end: PA 247 in Clinton Township

Location
- Country: United States
- State: Pennsylvania
- Counties: Wayne

Highway system
- Pennsylvania State Route System; Interstate; US; State; Scenic; Legislative
← PA 295	→ PA 297

Pennsylvania Route 296 (PA 296) is a 16.23-mile-long (26.12 km) state highway located in Wayne County, Pennsylvania. The southern terminus is at PA 191 in Lake Ariel. The northern terminus is at PA 247 in Clinton Township. The route is a two-lane undivided road which passes through rural areas. PA 296 heads northwest from PA 191 to Varden, where it intersects the northern terminus of PA 196 and turns to the north. The route continues through Waymart, where it crosses U.S. Route 6 (US 6), before heading north to its end at PA 247 west of Creamton. The portion of PA 296 north of PA 196 follows the Belmont and Easton Turnpike, a turnpike between Belmont and Easton that was chartered in 1812 and completed in 1820. PA 296 was designated on its present routing in the 1930s.

== Route description ==
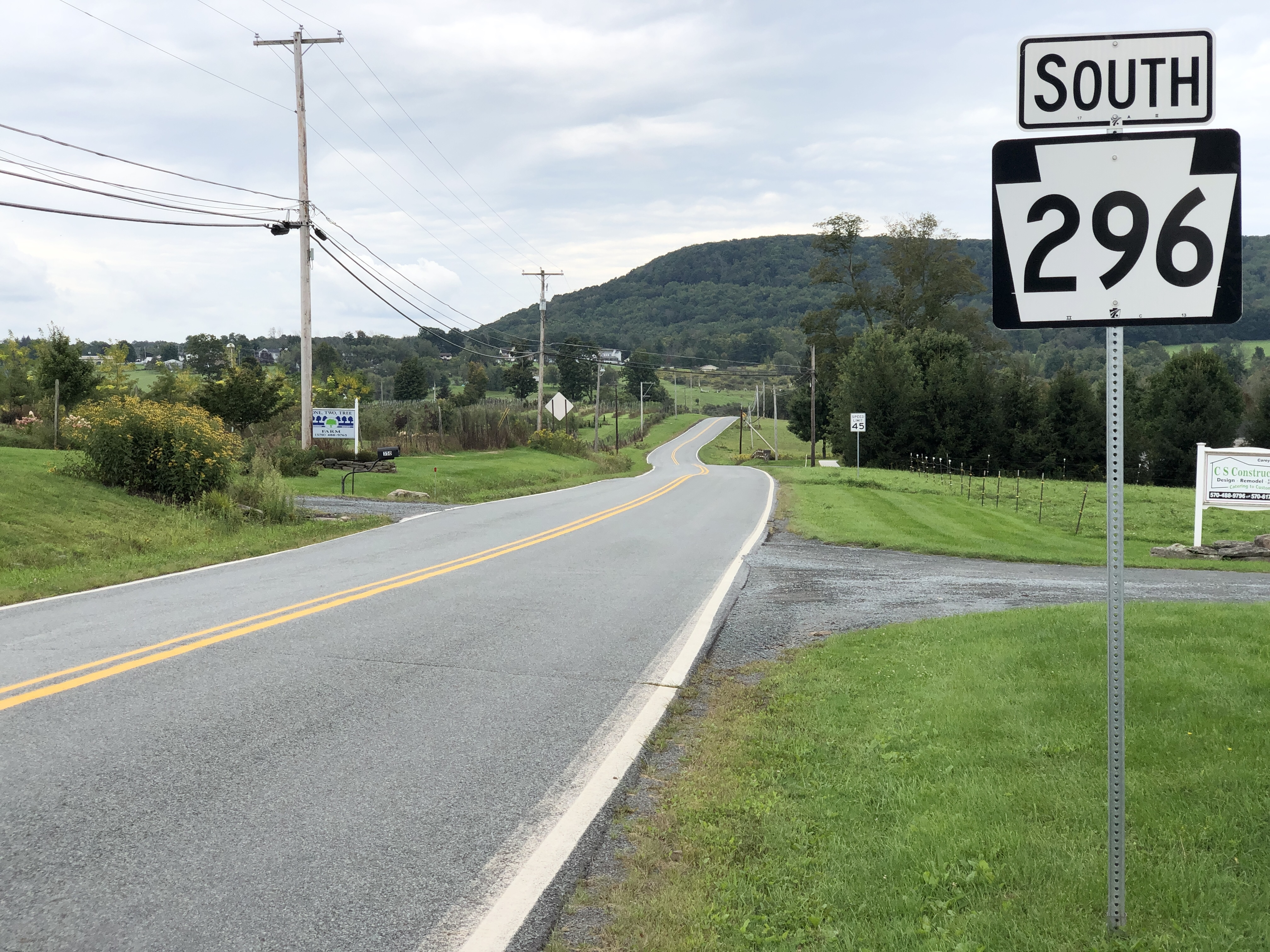
PA 296 southbound north of US 6 in Clinton Township

PA 296 begins at an intersection on a curve with PA 191 (Lake Ariel Highway) in downtown Lake Ariel. The route progresses northward through Lake Ariel as Gravity Road, passing a stretch of commercial businesses, which soon becomes residential for the stretch north of Lake Ariel. Just before the intersection with Paradise Lane, PA 296 curves to the northeast, winding its way through Lake Township. The residential road becomes further developed before intersection with Tisdel Road. At that intersection, PA 296 and Gravity Road turn on the right-of-way for Tisdel and head northwest into the hamlet of Gravity. That soon changes to Varden, where after several curves, PA 296 intersects with the northern terminus of PA 196 (Easton Turnpike).

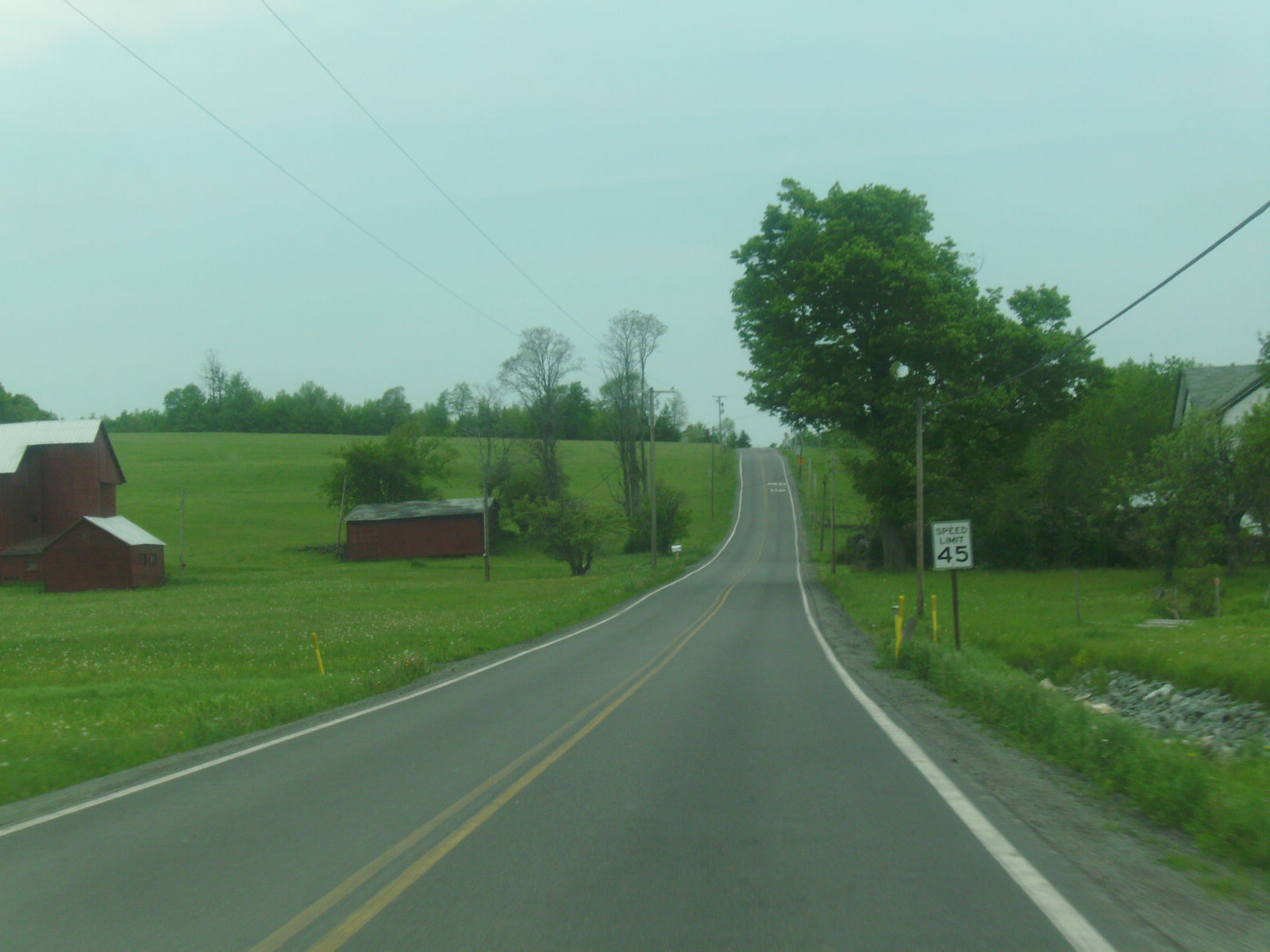
PA 296 approaching its northern terminus at PA 247 in Clinton Township

After crossing the northern terminus of PA 196, PA 296 approaches a local ponds and makes several winds to the north. The highway makes a long northwestern stretch through fields into South Canaan Township and soon into the hamlet of South Canaan. Now carrying the moniker of the Easton Turnpike, PA 296 leaves the residential hamlet after passing the local school. Curving north past the Red Maples Golf Club, the route becomes primarily rural and curves northward in different directions several times through South Canaan Township. PA 296 enters the borough of Waymart, crossing the Owego Turnpike and passing near Lake Leodore before intersecting with US 6 (Grand Army of the Republic Highway / Roosevelt Highway). PA 296 continues northward out of Waymart and becomes the Belmont Turnpike through Clinton Township. The route passes Elk Lake, turning northeastward through woodlands. After White Oak Pond, PA 296 makes a curve to the northeast and intersects with PA 247 (Creamton Drive) west of Creamton. As PA 247 takes over the right-of-way of the Belmont Turnpike, this serves as the northern terminus for PA 296.

== History ==
The section of PA 296 north of PA 196 follows part of the alignment of the Belmont and Easton Turnpike, a turnpike that was chartered on March 15, 1812 to run along the North and South road between the Easton and Wilkes-Barre Turnpike in Northampton County and the community of Belmont in Mount Pleasant Township, Wayne County. The turnpike was completed in 1819-1820. The Belmont and Easton Turnpike was used to transport cattle and sheep from Western New York to Easton and Philadelphia. The turnpike saw heavy traffic in its early days but traffic would decline with the rise of the railroads and other roads. When Pennsylvania first legislated routes in 1911, what is now PA 296 was not given a number. By 1930, the present alignment of the route was an unnumbered road, with the section between Varden and a point north of Waymart paved. PA 296 was designated between PA 90 (now PA 191) in Lake Ariel and PA 247 west of Creamton in the 1930s. At this time, the entire length of the route was paved.

== Major intersections ==
The entire route is in Wayne County.

Location	mi	km	Destinations	Notes
Lake Township	0.000	0.000	PA 191 (Lake Ariel Highway)	Southern terminus
Lake Township	2.590	4.168	PA 196 south (Easton Turnpike) – Hamlin	Northern terminus of PA 196
Waymart	10.298	16.573	US 6 (Grand Army of the Republic Highway / Roosevelt Highway) – Carbondale, Honesdale	
Clinton Township	16.177	26.034	PA 247 (Belmont Turnpike / Creamton Road) – Forest City, Creamton	Northern terminus
1.000 mi = 1.609 km; 1.000 km = 0.621 mi
