= Hershel Matt =

American rabbi

Hershel Jonah Matt (July 11, 1922 – December 26, 1987) was a rabbi, scholar and professor.

== Family ==
Hershel was born in Minneapolis, Minnesota on July 11, 1922, to Lena and Rabbi Calman David Matt. Hershel married his wife Gustine on March 10, 1946. They had four children: Jonathan, Daniel, David, and Deborah.

== Education ==
Matt attended the University of Pennsylvania and received a bachelor's degree in philosophy in 1943, graduating Phi Beta Kappa. Hershel was deeply influenced by his teachers Will Herberg and Abraham Joshua Heschel He was awarded a Master of Hebrew Literature from the Jewish Theological Seminary in 1947 and received Semicha from JTS in 1947.

== Career ==
He was a professor at the Jewish Theological Seminary, Reconstructionist Rabbinical College and Academy for Jewish Religion. Matt was the spiritual leader of congregations in New Jersey, New York and New Hampshire.

=== Rabbinical experience ===
- 1947–1950 Beth Abraham Congregation (Nashua, New Hampshire)
- 1950–1959 Temple Beth El (Troy, New York)
- 1959–1970 Temple Neve Shalom (Metuchen, New Jersey)
- 1970–1975 The Jewish Center (Princeton, New Jersey)
- 1975-1982 Temple Har Zion (Mount Holly, New Jersey)

== Religious views ==
Among his congregants, Matt encouraged deeper and more meaningful engagement with ritual observance and Torah study. A man of stringent personal ethical standards, Matt also attempted to bring greater ethical sensibility into the day-to-day functioning of the synagogue. Hershel's "Principles and Policies for the Ideal Congregation" proposes that synagogues refrain from excessive fund raising. On the issue of a proposed raffle at Temple Neve Shalom in Metuchen, Hershel issued the following list of objections: "Gambling is morally objectionable because it encourages the unworthy desire of obtaining something without earning or paying fair value for it. If the item to be raffled is a luxury item, the raffle encourages luxury and ostentation, which violate the Jewish standard of modest living." Disturbed by the ostentatious displays that accompanied bar and bat mitzvah celebrations, Matt convinced the Board of Temple Beth El in Troy to pass a "Resolution on Moderation in Serving Kiddush at Bar and Bat Mitzvahs."

Matt also spoke out and published on many controversial issues of his day. In the 1950s he pioneered the field of equal rights for women, calling them up to the Torah at Temple Beth El in Troy, New York. Later, he was among the first to support women in their struggle to be accepted for rabbinical studies at the Jewish Theological Seminary. Hershel also helped lead the fight for the acceptance of gay and lesbian Jews at the Reconstructionist Rabbinical College. A Zionist from childhood, he nonetheless felt a deep concern for Palestinian rights. In pursuing such controversial causes, Hershel rarely took a militant or divisive tone and managed not to alienate his colleagues. In the words of the Orthodox Rabbi Yitz Greenberg, "He forced us to consider new possibilities without betraying the tradition or the seriousness of the past...He was so kind and his spirit was so touching that he was able to say radical things that nobody else could say and yet get people to open their minds."

Matt's unconventional views went hand-in-hand with traditional Jewish beliefs. Hershel believed in God, the Messiah, the world-to-come, life-after-death, and bodily resurrection. In his words, "Whenever we are truly aware that we stand in God's holy presence, we can catch from within time a glimpse of eternity." Hershel also took special delight in performing and promoting ritual practices that were widely neglected, such as wearing a tallit katan, reciting Kiddush Levanah (the Blessing over the New Moon) and Tashlich.
