= Susan Weidman Schneider =

Canadian author

- Born: March 17, 1944 (age 82); Winnipeg, Manitoba, Canada
- Occupations: Editor-in-chief, author

Susan Weidman Schneider (born March 17, 1944) is a Canadian author, activist and editor of the feminist magazine Lilith. She has written several books and articles on a variety of topics including intermarriage, fertility, domestic abuse, conversion, Orthodoxy and feminism and LGBTQ issues.

== Childhood and education ==
Susan Weidman Schneider was born in Winnipeg, Manitoba, and grew up in a secular Jewish family. Her father was Sydney Herbert Weidman who worked as a wholesale grocer in his family business. Her mother, Zora Zagrabelna, attended university in an era when many girls did not and was an active member in the Jewish theatre scene and the Jewish Women's Musical Club. She acted in Yiddish theater troupes and wrote and directed plays for young adults.

During her childhood, Susan Weidman Schneider was an active member of her synagogue, in Jewish youth groups, and in an interfaith organization. In 1961, she started studying at Brandeis University. She described this time as her "political awakening".

In 1969, Weidman Schneider married Bruce Schneider, a doctor, and they moved several times within the United States and to Israel. The couple had three children: Benjamon (*1969), Rachel (*1973) and Yael (*1982).

== Work ==
=== Lilith: the independent Jewish women's magazine ===
In 1976, after spending some time in Israel with her family, Susan Weidman Schneider and a small group of women decided to found an "independent Jewish women's magazine". They named the quarterly magazine after the bible figure Lilith, Eve's predecessor in the Garden of Eden, who was expelled for wanting equality. The goal of the magazine was to show how the sexism of Jewish religion, history, and contemporary life posed a challenge to Jewish women and at the same time explore ways in which the religion could change on behalf of Jewish women. In the premiere issue's editorial, Weidman Schneider elaborates:

"As women we are attracted to much of the ideology of the general women's movement; as Jews, we recognize that we have particular concerns not always shared by other groups. How do we reconcile our sense of ourselves as worthy individuals while identifying with a religious and social structure that has limited women's options in the synagogue, the home, and the community at large?"

Susan Weidman Schneider has been working as editor-in-chief in the magazine's Manhattan offices since the publication of the first issue in 1976.

=== Jewish and Female: Choices and Changes in Our Lives Today (1984) ===
In this book, Weidman Schneider proposes ideas on how Jewish traditions and beliefs can be integrated into a modern lifestyle. She discusses issues such as Jewish law, marriage, women's bodies, divorce, children and male-dominated rituals. Throughout the text, women's voices are incorporated and the book includes a 90-page "networking directory" of Jewish women's organizations.

=== Intermarriage: The Challenge of Living with Differences between Christians and Jews (1989) ===
In her second book, Susan Weidman Schneider discusses possibilities to build a successful interfaith marriage whilst not attempting to erase differences.

=== Head and Heart: A Woman's Guide to Financial Independence (1991) ===
In her third book, that Weidman Schneider co-authored with Arthur B.C. Drache, she gives advice to women on financial security, the economic aspects of relationships, divorce, widowhood, and responsibility for dependents.

== Awards and honours ==
Susan Weidman Schneider has been awarded several prizes for her work on Lilith and her activism.

In 2015, she received the Alumni Achievement Award from Brandeis University, the National Council of Jewish Women awarded her the "Woman Who Dared" award and she received the Polakoff Lifetime Achievement Award in journalism for her work on Lilith.
