= Lilith (magazine) =

American feminist magazine

- Lilith magazine , Spring 2008
- Editor: Susan Weidman Schneider
- Categories: Feminism, Judaism
- Frequency: Quarterly
- Founded: 1976
- Company: Lilith Publications
- Country: United States
- Based in: New York, NY
- Language: English
- Website: lilith.org
- ISSN: 0146-2334

Lilith is an independent, Jewish-American, feminist non-profit magazine that has been issued quarterly since 1976.

== History ==
The magazine was founded in 1976 by a small group of women led by Susan Weidman Schneider: "to foster discussion of Jewish women's issues and put them on the agenda of the Jewish community, with a view to giving women—who are more than fifty percent of the world's Jews—greater choice in Jewish life." Amy Stone served as the magazine's first senior editor. Aviva Cantor Zuckoff served as the acquisitions editor. Those consulted as part of the creation of the magazine included Sally Priesand, the first female rabbi in the United States, and Letty Cottin Pogrebin of Ms. Magazine.

Weidman Schneider and her colleagues founded Lilith to fill the gap in the feminist movement and feminist press with a publication that focuses on religion and specific experiences of women from minority populations. This aim was explained in the editorial of the magazine's first issue in 1976:

As women we are attracted to much of the ideology of the general women's movement; as Jews, we recognize that we have particular concerns not always shared by other groups. How do we reconcile our sense of ourselves as worthy individuals while identifying with a religious and social structure that has limited women's options in the synagogue, the home, and the community at large?

During its early years, Lilith focused on religious topics and the organizational establishment of the Jewish community. They chronicled the fight to ordain women at the Jewish Theological Seminary and published frequent updates and articles on the topic. Lilith also publishes fiction, poetry and reviews of books, films, theater, and music.

In 2022, the magazine published the short story collection Frankly Feminist: Short Stories by Jewish Women, edited by Susan Weidman Schneider and Yona Zeldis McDonough with a foreword by Anita Diamant.

Lilith magazine received five Rockower Awards in 2022.

== Name ==
The publication is named after Lilith, a character said to be Adam's first wife. Though not mentioned in the Bible, the medieval Alphabet of Sirach claims that she was banished from Eden after refusing to be submissive to Adam. Lilith has been interpreted by modern feminists as a symbol of independence and social activism geared towards women's rights.

== Staff and Contributors ==
Susan Weidman Schneider has been Lilith′s editor-in-chief since 1976. She is the author of the books Jewish and Female and Intermarriage: The Challenge of Living with Differences between Christians and Jews, and co-author of Head and Heart, about money in the lives of women. Writers, editors and contributors to Lilith include Cynthia Ozick, Grace Paley, Letty Cottin Pogrebin, Nessa Rapoport, Blu Greenberg, Allegra Goodman, Myla Goldberg, Rabbi Susan Schnur (senior editor), Naomi Danis (managing editor), Sarah Seltzer (executive editor), Dara Horn, Jennifer Baumgartner, Marge Piercy, Alicia Ostriker (poetry editor), Sarah Blustain, Leela Corman, Liana Finck, Danya Ruttenberg, Shira Spector, Rachel Kadish, Anat Litwin, Ilana Stanger-Ross, Leslea Newman, Yona Zeldis McDonough (fiction editor), Alice Sparberg Alexiou, Amy Stone, Ilana Kurshan, Francine Klagsbrun, Lori Hope Lefkowitz, Tova Hartman, and more. Lilith has also published the work of visual artists, including Judy Chicago, Miriam Schapiro, Elana Maryles Sztokman, Joan Roth (photographer), Maira Kalman, Roz Chast, and Eva Hesse.
