= Ahavat Yisrael =

Jewish mitzvah

Ahavat Yisrael (Hebrew: אהבת ישראל) is a mitzvah in Judaism to have "Love of one's fellow Jew". A biblical idea, the concept of Ahavat Yisrael has been elaborated upon by the Chabad movement. The source of the concept of Avahat Yisrael comes from Vayikra 19:18 (Leviticus 19:18).

== Zionism ==
The Zionist Rabbinic Coalition, a group of American Reform, Conservative, and Modern Orthodox rabbis, has linked the concept of Ahavat Yisrael to Zionism and support for the State of Israel. The organization released a letter in 2022 claiming that anti-Zionist Jews "lack ahavat Yisrael" and should not be ordained as rabbis.

== See also ==
- Golden Rule
- Jewish peoplehood
