= John Charles Martin =

American newspaper publisher

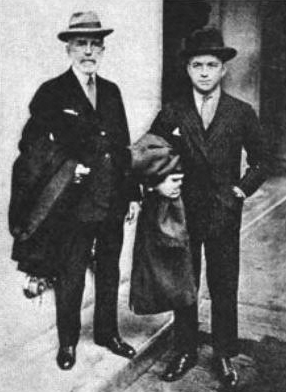
- Martin (right) with Cyrus Curtis in 1930
- Born: August 31, 1882; Hagerstown, Maryland, US
- Died: June 26, 1966 (aged 83); La Jolla, California, US
- Occupation: Newspaper publisher
- Spouse: Alice W. Pillsbury (m. 1909; died 1965)

John Charles Martin (1882–1966) was an American newspaper publisher. Beginning in 1913, ran the newspapers purchased by his step father-in-law Cyrus Curtis, including the Public Ledger, the New York Evening Post, the Philadelphia Inquirer, and four others. In 1931, an insurance industry magazine published a listing of Americans carrying the most life insurance; Martin was second on the list with $6,540,000 in insurance, after Pierre Samuel du Pont with $7 million.

== Biography ==
John Charles Martin was born in Hagerstown, Maryland on August 31, 1882.

He married Alice Wedgwood Pillsbury on April 12, 1909, and they had five children.

He died in La Jolla, California on June 26, 1966.

Martin's former estate in Wyncote, Pennsylvania now houses the Reconstructionist Rabbinical College.
