= Jewish peoplehood =

Jews as a people

Jewish peoplehood (Hebrew: עמיות יהודית, Amiut Yehudit), also sometimes referred to as the whole of Israel (Hebrew: or עם ישראל Am Yisrael, meaning the overall Jewish people, not people of modern-day Israel, or כלל ישראל Klal Yisrael), is the concept of the Jewish people as a collective and the sense of belonging across religious, geographic, cultural, and political differences. The concept describes Jews as an ethnoreligious group and nation originating from the ancient Israelites and also the bonds that connect Jews through shared ancestry, history, traditions, and communal ties. Even though it's rooted in Jewish religious and historical traditions, Jewish peoplehood has also been developed in modern Jewish thought as a framework for understanding Jewish collective identity and the relationship between Jews in Israel and Jews in the diaspora. Scholars and leaders interpreted Jewish peoplehood as deriving from a shared destiny, mission, kinship, mutual responsibility, or obligation, and have debated its relationship to Jewish nationhood and Zionism.

== Concept ==
The concept of Jewish peoplehood is twofold: It describes the Jews as a people, i.e. an ethnoreligious group and nation originating from the Israelites of ancient Israel and Judah. It also describes the feeling of belonging and commitment to the Jewish people (Hebrew: עם ישראל, "Am Yisrael", People of Israel).

Some believe that the concept of Jewish peoplehood is a paradigm shift in Jewish life. They say that instead of Jewish life focusing on Jewish nationalism (Zionism), Jewish life should focus on Jewish peoplehood. Others maintain that the concept of peoplehood has permeated Jewish life for millennia, and to focus on it does not constitute a shift from the focus on Jewish nationhood. Jews have sustained a sense of joint responsibility toward their people and its members for over 2,000 years. Persecutions such as the expulsion of Roman Jews from the vicinity of Jerusalem and the districts of Gophna, Herodion, and Aqraba resulted in more than 100,000 slaves taken as war captives in the aftermath of the Bar Kokhba revolt which contributed to a significant rise in the historical Jewish diaspora. Subsequently, since the late Roman period, a significant recovery took place through common religious practices, shared ancestry, continuous communication, and population transfers between Sephardi and Ashkenazi Jews, during which time the former had a "Hebrew Golden Age". In the modern era, aliyah (immigration since the birth of Zionism to political entities in the region of Palestine and the State of Israel) resulted in Israeli scholar Eliezer Schweid warning against a possible Zionist "negation of the Diaspora".

At the same time, the concepts of Jews as a nation and as a people are not always viewed as at odds with one another. According to scholars such as Rabbi Mordecai Kaplan, defining Judaism as a people or a "civilization" suggests a wide variety of values within the context of Judaism.

== Jewish writings ==
The concept of a distinctive Jewish people is seen in the Hebrew Bible and other Jewish writings. Throughout the Torah, Prophets and Writings, Jews are variously referred to as a congregation, a nation, children of Israel or even a kingdom (Eda, Uma, Am, B'nai Israel, Mamlakha respectively), all implying a connection among people.

"There is a certain people scattered abroad and dispersed among the peoples in all the provinces of thy kingdom; and their laws are diverse from those of every people" Esther 3:8

== History ==
Jewish people in the diaspora during the Middle Ages were united by a common history, although this did not create a unified society. Jacob Katz writes that medieval Jews in the diaspora maintained educational, civil, and religious institutions based on a common tradition, although they varied from place to place. Jewish communities were separate in many cases from their environment, and had extensive mutual contacts with each other, including mutual aid, responses to crises, and concern for each other's fate, dependent on long-distance travel and communication. Particularly in the 16th through 18th centuries, contacts between diaspora Jewish communities were stronger than in any period since the decline of the Roman Empire. Katz cites 1745 in Prague and Khmelnytsky pogroms as examples of crises that saw worldwide responses from Jewish communities.

== Modern Jewish peoplehood ==
Some modern Jewish leaders in the diaspora, particularly American Jews, found the traditional conception of Jews as a "nation among the nations" problematic, posing a challenge to integration and inviting antisemitic charges of dual loyalty. The first significant use of the "peoplehood" concept was by Mordecai Kaplan, co-founder of the Reconstructionist School of Judaism, who was searching for a term that would enable him to describe the complex nature of Jewish belonging. Once the State of Israel was founded, he rejected the concept of nationhood, as it had become too closely identified with statehood, and replaced it with the peoplehood concept. In his work Judaism as a Civilization, Kaplan sought to define the Jewish people and religion in socio-cultural terms as well as religious ones.

Kaplan's definition of Judaism as "an evolving religious civilization" illumines his understanding of the centrality of Peoplehood in the Jewish religion. Describing Judaism as a religious civilization emphasizes the idea that Jewish people have sought "to make [their] collective experience yield meaning for the enrichment of the life of the individual Jew and for the spiritual greatness of the Jewish people." The definition as a civilization allows Judaism to accept the principles of unity in diversity and continuity in change. It is a reminder that Judaism consists of much that cannot be put into the category of religion in modern times, "paradoxical as it may sound, the spiritual regeneration of the Jewish people demands that religion cease to be its sole preoccupation." In the sense that existence precedes essence and life takes precedence over thought, Judaism exists for the sake of the Jewish people rather than the Jewish people existing for the sake of Judaism.

Kaplan's purpose in developing the Jewish Peoplehood idea was to create a vision broad enough to include everyone who identified as a Jew regardless of individual approaches to that identity.

Contemporary scholarship has examined Jewish belonging as a multidimensional process shaped by religious, educational, familial, communal, and social contexts rather than by a single marker of identity.

=== In modern Jewish life ===
Since 2000, major Jewish organizations have embraced the peoplehood concept and intellectual interest in the topic has increased. Major organizations such as the Jewish Federations of North America, the JFNA New York Federation, the Jewish Agency for Israel, the Israel Ministry for Education, the Diaspora Museum, the Avi Chai Foundation, the American Jewish Committee and many other smaller organizations are either introducing the peoplehood concept as an organizing principle in their organizations or initiating high-profile programming with an explicit focus on Jewish Peoplehood.

Natan Sharansky, the Jewish Agency’s chairman from 2009 to 2018, declared that the agency’s traditional Zionist mission had outlived its usefulness. In his new capacity, he has made Israel education and promoting Jewish Peoplehood a priority, particularly among the young.

=== Key characteristics ===
Alongside the use of the peoplehood concept by Jewish organizations, there is a parallel growth of intellectual interest in the topic since 2000. The intellectual discussion asks what is "Jewish Peoplehood"? What are the key characteristics that distinguish Jewish Peoplehood from other concepts or other ethnic or religious communities?

=== Areas of agreement ===
The areas of agreement among Jewish intellectuals writing about the concept of Jewish Peoplehood point to three principles:

The three unifying principles of the Jewish Peoplehood theory:

1. A multidimensional experience of Jewish belonging: the concept of Jewish Peoplehood assumes an understanding of Jewish belonging that is multidimensional.
2. Rejection of any dominant ideology, which over emphasizes one dimension of Jewishness: strong ideological frameworks that overemphasize one dimension of the larger Jewish experience are not an acceptable starting point for understanding how individuals connect to the Jewish People.
3. Focus on the nature of the connection between Jews and not on the Jewish Identity: Those concerned with the Jewish Peoplehood concept do not focus on the identity of individuals, but rather on the nature of connections between Jews. The concern is with common elements and frameworks that enable Jews to connect with one another both emotionally and socially.

These three principles combined imbue the peoplehood concept with coherence and offer an added value to organizations that wish to create programs “that build Jewish Peoplehood” in a sustainable and measurable way.

=== Different perspectives ===
There are several variants of the communitarian position among intellectuals writing about Jewish Peoplehood. The common denominator is the desire to find common ground upon which connections between Jews are built.

The four distinct positions regarding Jewish Peoplehood:

1. Peoplehood as a common destiny.
2. Peoplehood as a shared mission with an emphasis on Tikkun Olam.
3. Peoplehood as a shared kinship and mutual responsibility.
4. Peoplehood as an obligation.

For some critics, Jewish Peoplehood is still an amorphous and abstract concept that presents an optional ideological approach towards the Jewish collective. Others wonder if it is too weak a foundation on which to base Jewish collective identity, especially since the vision of Peoplehood is not necessarily predicated on having any kind of religious or spiritual identity.

== See also ==
- Jewish culture
- Ahavat Yisrael
- Jewish diaspora
- Zionism
- Jewish identity
- Am Yisrael Chai
- Christendom
- Ummah
