= Judaism as a Civilization =

1934 text by Mordecai M. Kaplan

Judaism as a Civilization: Toward a Reconstruction of American-Jewish Life
- Author: Mordecai M. Kaplan
- Cover artist: Janet Halverson
- Language: English
- Subject: Judaism, Sociology of Jewry
- Genre: Religion
- Published: 1934 (The Macmillan Company), 1967 (Shocken Books)
- Publication place: United States
- Media type: Print
- Pages: 601 pages (1967 edition)
- ISBN: 978-1330267707

Judaism as a Civilization: Toward a Reconstruction of American-Jewish Life is a 1934 work on Judaism and American Jewish life by Rabbi Mordecai M. Kaplan, the founder of Reconstructionist Judaism.

The book is Kaplan's most notable work and has influenced a number of American Jewish thinkers. Kaplan's work centers around the concept that Judaism ought not to be defined as the religion of the Jews, but the sum of Jewish religion, culture, language, literature and social organization.

== Background ==
In 1934, Kaplan published Judaism as a Civilization, a seminal work that eventually provided the theological foundation for the new Reconstructionist movement. Kaplan was deeply influenced by the new field of sociology and its definition of "civilization" as characterized not only by beliefs and rituals, but also by art, culture, ethics, history, language, literature, social organization, symbols, and local customs.

Kaplan argued that Judaism is, in essence, a religious civilization; its religious elements are primarily human, naturalistic expressions of a specific culture. Kaplan felt that Jewish group survival in the United States depended on Jews reconstructing their lives on the cultural foundation of a historical peoplehood.

== Contents ==
Judaism as a Civilization is divided as follows:

- Introduction
- Part One - The Factors in the Crises
- Part Two - The Current Versions of Judaism
- Part Three - The Proposed Version of Judaism
- Part Four - Israel: The Status and Organization of Jewry
- Part Five - God: The Development of the Jewish Religion
- Part Six - Torah: Judaism as a Way of Life for the American Jew
- Conclusion
