= Reconstructing Judaism =

Synagogue arm of Reconstructionist Judaism

- Theology: Progressive Judaism
- Associations: World Union for Progressive Judaism
- Region: 7 countries
- Origin: 1955
- Official website: www.reconstructingjudaism.org

Reconstructing Judaism is a Reconstructionist Judaism federation, serving more than 100 congregations in 7 countries.

== History ==
The Jewish Reconstructionist Federation was founded in 1955. In June 2012, the Reconstructionist movement underwent a restructuring that merged JRF with the Reconstructionist Rabbinical College to form a new national organization initially named RRC and Jewish Reconstructionist Communities. The merged organization was initially headed by Rabbi Dan Ehrenkrantz, a 1989 graduate of the College.. Rabbi Deborah Waxman took over in 2014. In January 2018, the merged organization changed its name to Reconstructing Judaism. In 2026, Rabbi Elliott Tepperman was named the organization’s president and chief executive officer. Tepperman previously was rabbi of Bnai Keshet in Montclair, New Jersey.

In 2025, tensions over Israel led the largest Reconstructionist synagogue in the U.S., Kehillat Israel in Pacific Palisades, California, to announce plans to disaffiliate from the movement. The congregation cited dissatisfaction with the national leadership’s perceived lack of support for Zionism and failure to adequately address rising anti-Zionist sentiment among Reconstructionist rabbis and institutions.

== See also ==
- List of Reconstructionist synagogues
