= South Sterling, Pennsylvania =

Unincorporated community in Pennsylvania, US

- Unincorporated community
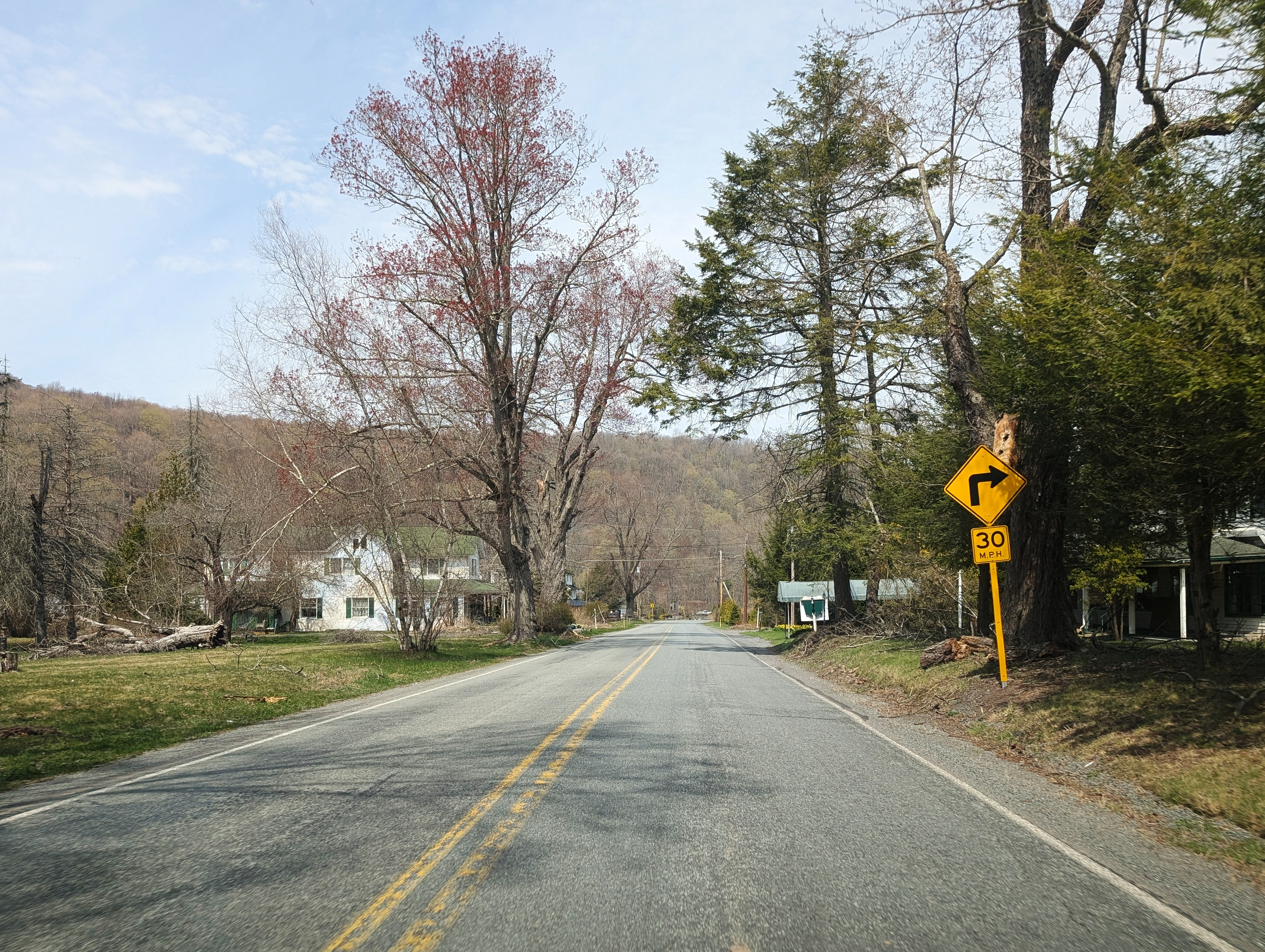
- PA 191 northbound through South Sterling

- Location within Pennsylvania
- Coordinates: 41°15′51″N 75°20′53″W
- Country: United States
- State: Pennsylvania
- County: Wayne
- Township: Dreher
- Elevation: 1,526 ft (465 m)
- Time zone: UTC-5 (Eastern (EST))
  - Summer (DST): UTC-4 (EDT)
- ZIP codes: 18445, 18460
- Area codes: 570 and 272
- GNIS feature ID: 1188111

South Sterling is an unincorporated community in Dreher Township, Wayne County, Pennsylvania, United States. South Sterling is located along Pennsylvania Route 191 and the Wallenpaupack Creek, north of the intersection with Pennsylvania Route 423 and near the border with Pike County.
