= Dan Ehrenkrantz =

American Reconstructionist rabbi

Dan Ehrenkrantz is an American Reconstructionist rabbi, currently serving as the outgoing president of the Reconstructionist Rabbinical College in Wyncote, Pennsylvania.

== Career ==
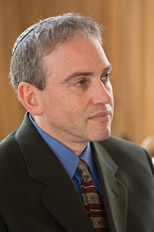
Rabbi Dan Ehrenkrantz.

Ehrenkrantz graduated magna cum laude with B.A. degree in Religion from Tufts University. He received an M.A. in Hebrew Letters degree and rabbinic ordination from the Reconstructionist Rabbinical College (RRC) in 1989.

He served as rabbi of Congregation Bnai Keshet in Montclair, N.J. from 1988 to 2002, where he developed a new family education program. He was active in local programs for interfaith understanding. He served as president of the Reconstructionist Rabbinical Association, the professional association of Reconstructionist rabbis, from 1999 to 2001.

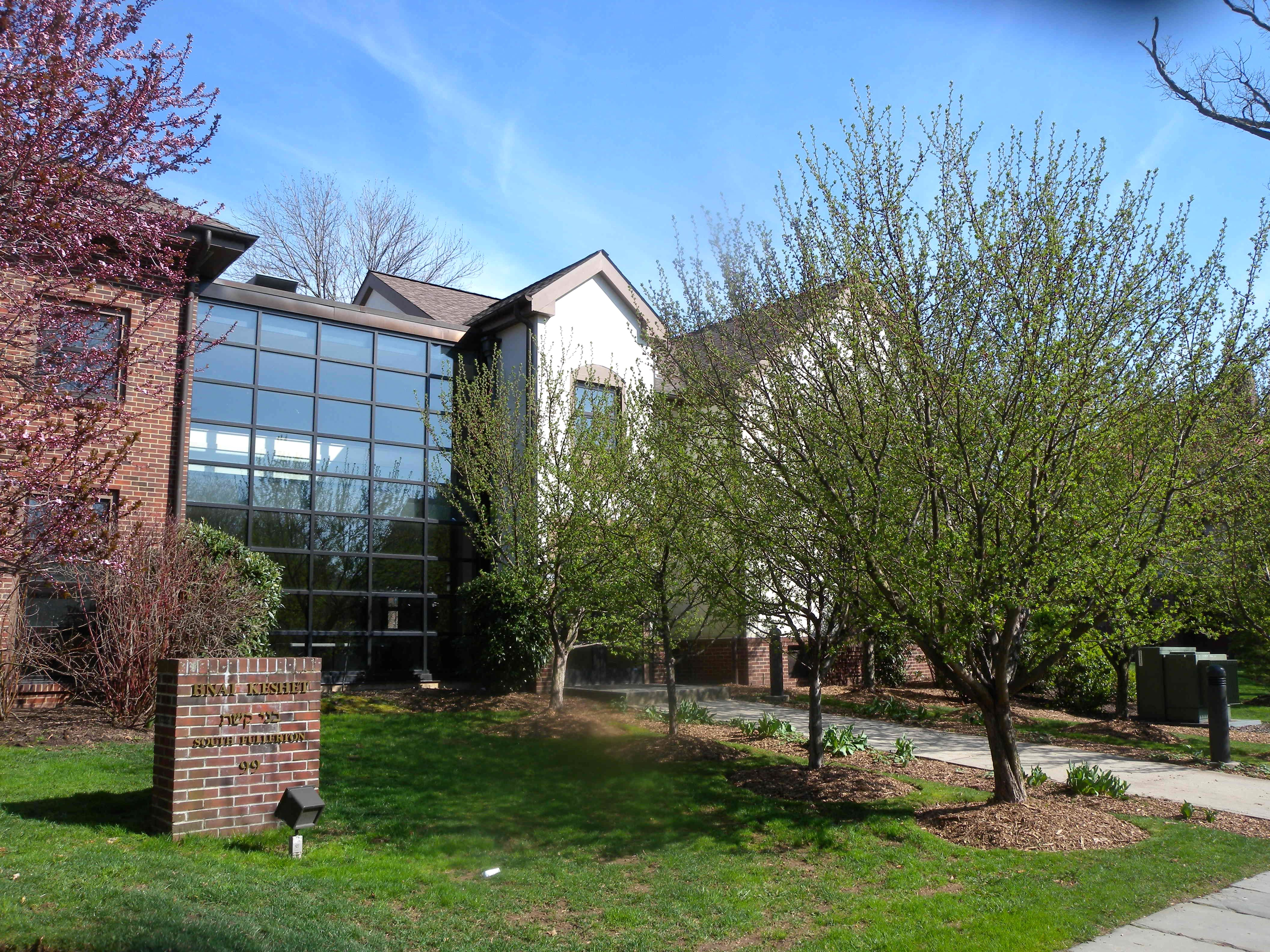
Bnai Keshet

Prior to his appointment as president of RRC in 2002, Ehrenkrantz served both as a visiting instructor for courses at RRC on Biblical Narrative and Poetry and the Challenges of the Rabbinate, and as a spiritual mentor to RRC students. In addition to his responsibilities as president, he is the Aaron and Marjorie Ziegelman Professor at RRC, where he has taught courses on Contemporary Jewish Literature, Modern and Contemporary Hebrew Literature and Darshanut, creative interpretation of traditional texts, as a member of the faculty. Ehrenkrantz has lectured at institutions of higher education throughout the country. He is the first graduate of RRC to serve as its president.

As of June 3, 2012 the Reconstructionist movement was restructured. RRC is now the primary organization of the movement, headed by Ehrenkrantz. On February 28, 2013, Ehrenkrantz announced that he will resign his position at RRC when a replacement is selected.

== Publications and recognition ==
Ehrenkrantz has been listed annually by The Daily Beast magazine from 2007 through 2012 as one of the fifty most influential rabbis in America.

His writings have appeared in a wide range of Jewish and general-interest publications, including Jewish Week, the Jerusalem Report, the Charlotte Observer and Child magazine. He has contributed commentary to The Guide to Jewish Practice (RRC Press) on the topics of kashrut, tzedakah, bioethics, mourning and speech; and authored an essay in the forthcoming The Dream of Zion, edited by Rabbi Jeffrey K. Salkin (Jewish Lights Publishing).

Ehrenkrantz has written widely on American Judaism, the Reconstructionist movement, and on the role of religion in America. He often serves as a spokesperson for the Reconstructionist movement in Judaism, meeting with Jewish leaders as well as political and other national figures.

In his inaugural address, he gave a definition of Reconstructionist Judaism:

Ehrenkrantz has stated that the Reconstructionist movement is unique within Jewish life in not regarding Judaism as a religion created by God, and that this view implies the Jewish people were not chosen by God to carry a singular true religion into the world, nor does he see the purpose of creation as disproportionately centered on the Jewish community. He has said that Jewish study at the RRC fosters a love of Judaism and Jewish life without relying on ideas of Jewish supremacy, and that the RRC has developed a model combining religious passion and allegiance with tolerance and respect for others. He has described this shift from a medieval to a contemporary worldview as one he believes the broader Jewish community and the wider world need to make as well, characterizing the goals of the RRC and the Reconstructionist movement as essential to addressing the challenges facing the world today.

In a 2007 interview with the Jewish Journal of Los Angeles, Ehrenkrantz outlined what connects Reconstructionist Jews. “Q: What unites Reconstructionist Jews?”

DE: “They are united in being interested and open to questions of Jewish life, they are united in placing community as a value. The synagogues are run in such a way that insists that members take Judaism and create it for themselves, and the process of doing that brings people closer together.”

Ehrenkrantz advocates a link between spirituality and religion. He told the Hartford Courant in 2008 that “spirituality is ‘the awareness of being connected to something larger than ourselves...’You can have spirituality without religion, says Ehrenkrantz, though both suffer from the lack of the other. Religion without spirituality would be empty, he said, and spirituality without a framework like religion is difficult because, he said, most people ‘need the discipline, community and constant reminders that religious traditions offer.’”
