= Ma'yan =

Ma'yan is a non-profit organization supporting research, education, and advocacy with and on behalf of adolescent girls. Ma'yan is housed in the JCC in Manhattan.

== History ==
Ma'yan was founded in 1993 by Barbara Dobkin and Eve Landau, as Ma'yan: The Jewish Women's Project. The organization aimed to empower women in Jewish ritual and contemporary Jewish culture.

The organization was instrumental in popularizing the feminist Passover Seder, which reconceives the passover rituals in order to celebrate women's role in the Passover story and Judaism as a whole. Ma'yan's feminist seder notably includes a cup for Miriam on the table in addition to the cup for Elijah. According to The New York Times, "The first Ma'yan seder was held in 1994 with 150 women and a waiting list of another 100 who could not get in. Within a few years, Ma'yan was holding them at a catering space with room for 500 people, and holding them on four consecutive nights."

A feminist passover haggadah, The Journey Continues published by Ma'yan, sold over 40,000 copies.

Additionally, between 1997 and 2004, Ma'yan published Journey, a tri-annual journal about women and Jewish spirituality.

== Transformation ==
In 2006, Ma'yan re-cast itself. The organization believed it had been successful in creating a change in the Jewish community, as demonstrated by the ubiquity of the feminist seder. "We can give it up because it became mainstream," said Ma'yan co-founder Eve Landau. Ma'yan changed its name from Ma'yan: The Jewish Women's Project to Ma'yan: Listen for a change and now works with adolescent girls and educators around issues of privilege, social justice, and feminism.

== See also ==
Jewish feminism
