= Reconstructionist Rabbinical College =

Jewish seminary in Wyncote, Pennsylvania

Coordinates: 40.0876°N 75.1495°W

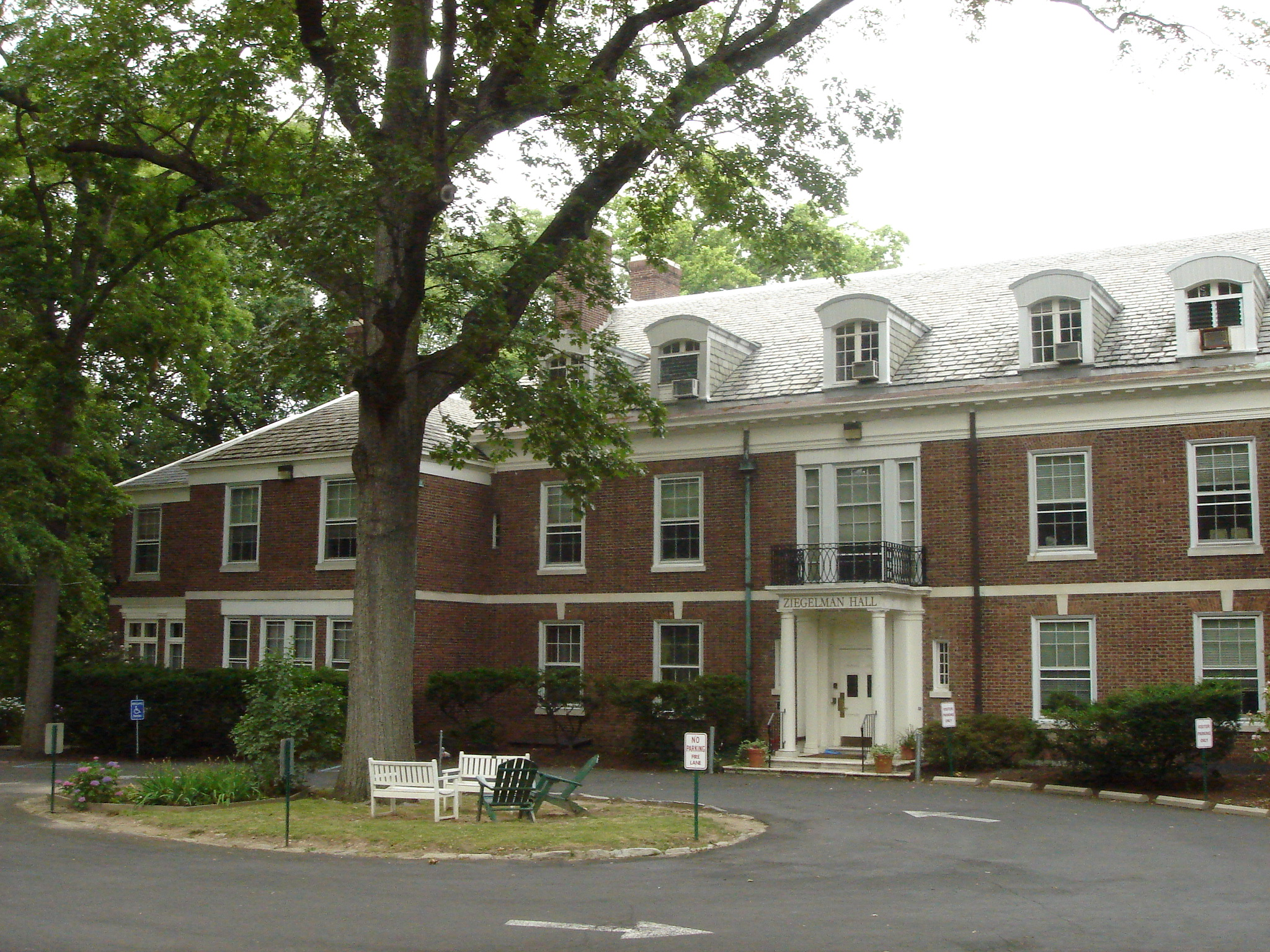
- Type: Private
- Established: 1968
- Affiliations: Reconstructionist Judaism
- President: Rabbi Deborah Waxman
- Faculty: 38
- Location: Wyncote, Pennsylvania, United States
- Website: www.rrc.edu

The Reconstructionist Rabbinical College (RRC) is a Jewish seminary in Wyncote, Pennsylvania. It is the only seminary affiliated with Reconstructionist Judaism. It is accredited by the Commission on Higher Education of the Middle States Association of Colleges and Schools. RRC has an enrollment of approximately 80 students in rabbinic and other graduate programs.

A 2012 restructuring of the Reconstructionist movement's institutions left RRC as the primary organization of the movement, headed by Rabbi Deborah Waxman. This central organization changed its name to "Reconstructing Judaism" in January 2018. The Reconstructionist Rabbinical College remains part of this organization.

== History ==
=== Founding to 1981 ===
Reconstructionist Judaism, a liberal movement that views Judaism as the “evolving religious civilization of the Jewish people,” was established by Mordecai Kaplan in the 1930s as a school of thought. He had extensive influence on American Judaism, particularly on Conservative and Reform Judaism. However, his followers, including Ira Eisenstein (Kaplan’s son-in-law and leader of the Jewish Reconstructionist Foundation from 1959 onward), were frustrated by the lack of a continuing framework to promote their ideas in American Judaism. Eisenstein criticized dependence on “’Reconstructionist rabbis’ …borrowed from the ranks of Reform and Conservativism…A movement must produce its own leaders.” Kaplan himself was reluctant to establish a seminary, which would have meant creating a separate denomination alongside Reform, Conservative, and Orthodox Judaism. However, lay and rabbinic leaders of the small Federation of Reconstructionist Congregations and Havurot (FRCH, later re-named the Jewish Reconstructionist Federation) encouraged this step, and Kaplan eventually gave his blessing. At the FRCH conference in Montreal in June 1967, the delegates overwhelmingly called for the establishment of a school for training rabbis.

The college opened in 1968 and is based in two brownstone buildings at 2308 North Broad Street in Philadelphia, Pennsylvania, near Temple University.

From its founding, RRC had two unique features in its curriculum. First, based on the Reconstructionist concept of an “evolving religious civilization,” the five-year curriculum was centered on a historical period each year. These were biblical, rabbinic, medieval, modern (roughly to 1948), and contemporary periods. During each year, students would focus on the history, texts, and concepts of that period. With modifications, this developmental approach continues as a central feature of the RRC curriculum. RRC describes this goal:”…students enter into a dialogue with those in previous generations who addressed perennial human issues. In this way, RRC educates leaders who can articulate the voice of tradition as it speaks to today’s Jews.”

The second curricular innovation, based on Kaplan’s concept that American Jews live in two civilizations (Jewish and American), had all rabbinical students enroll in a secular doctoral program, initially in religion at Temple University (a nearby state-related institution), later including other potential majors and universities. The goal was for students to be aware of general trends in the study of religion and other religious traditions. This “dual program” proved difficult to complete, as most students were enrolled in two graduate programs while also working part-time. The initial doctoral requirement was eventually reduced to a secular master's degree.

The Reconstructionist Rabbinical College also recognized that future rabbis needed preparation beyond purely academic courses and textual studies. From the early years of RRC, there were courses in practical rabbinics, covering issues such as pastoral counseling and life-cycle events. In more recent years, these have expanded to a multi-tiered program of practical rabbinics that includes coursework, supervised field internships, group supervision, and a requirement to shadow religious leaders in the field.

=== 1981-1993 ===
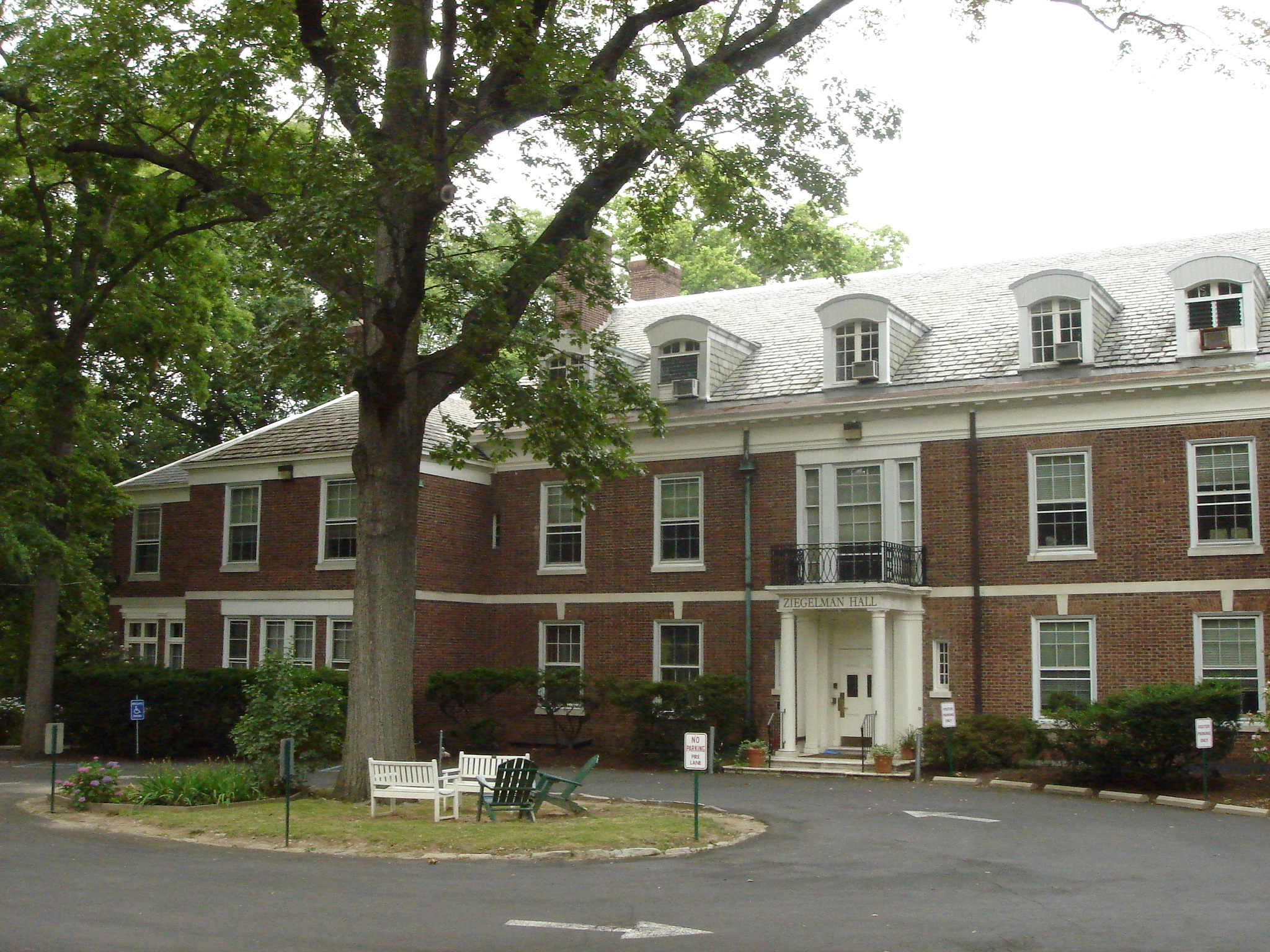
Ziegelman Hall, the RRC's main building

In 1981, Eisenstein, the founding president, retired, succeeded by Ira Silverman (1981–86). Under his leadership, RRC moved from its urban setting in September 1982 to its current location, formerly the mansion of John Charles Martin, on Church Road in suburban Wyncote.

By the early 1980s, curriculum changes at RRC included more Hebrew, classic texts, and electives, reducing the time available for secular graduate studies. In addition, many more entering students were preparing for their second career and had already completed a secular master's degree or the equivalent. The “dual program” requirement for a secular graduate degree was dropped. However, a program of courses in religious studies, including Christianity, Islam, and Eastern religions, was instituted at RRC, some taught by adjunct faculty. At least two of these courses, including one in Christianity, are required for rabbinical students. A mekhinah (preparatory) year was added for many students who needed additional work in Hebrew and traditional Jewish sources and traditions.

Arthur Green, a student of mysticism and a founder of the havurah movement, became president in 1987 after serving as dean from 1984. Faculty and student enrollment significantly increased, and the Israel study program expanded. To move beyond a strictly academic focus, RRC began offering programs in spiritual growth in 1987, under the leadership of Dean Jacob Staub. Staub commented that the early focus of RRC, as with other seminaries, was not on questions of meaning, but “We were going for the original, objective, dispassionate description of phenomena.” But this expansion enabled the faculty to begin working with students as spiritual people and future leaders. The first experimental edition of a new Reconstructionist Sabbath eve prayer book, the first in the Kol Haneshamah series, by the Reconstructionist Press in 1989 included contributions from a number of RRC faculty members.

=== Since 1993 ===
David Teutsch became president in 1993. During his tenure, the college strengthened its financial base and expanded its programs, publications, and facilities. The new series of Reconstructionist prayer books, Kol Haneshamah, was published under the leadership of Teutsch. Although RRC struggled to reach a $500,000 minimum endowment in its early years, by 1992 it reached $2.4 million, $14.8 million in 2004, and $19.7 million in 2006. Cantorial and master’s programs in Jewish studies were added. Three academic centers were established: The Center for Jewish Ethics (1994), Kolot: The Center for Jewish Women’s and Gender Studies (1996), and Hiddur: The Center for Aging and Judaism (2003).

RRC had long been preparing students for a variety of rabbinic careers, including campus work, chaplaincy, Jewish education, and congregational leadership. Especially since the mid-1990s, many students have taken at least one unit of Clinical Pastoral Education, a supervised program of training for clergy and other caregivers, often based in a hospital.

During this time, the college expanded its vision of modeling the creation of a Jewish community for its future rabbis. From 1998, aided by a grant from the Nathan Cummings Foundation, a Jewish spiritual direction program founded by faculty member Jacob Staub grew. In 2007, on a completely voluntary basis, spiritual direction included 75% of the student body. The program includes individual meetings with a spiritual director, small groups, and in hevrutah (partners or dyads). Faculty member Barbara Breitman says, “Every spiritual tradition has within it the qualities of soul that people need to cultivate in their lives so that they can live according to a higher sense of purpose: generosity, patience, gratitude, truthfulness. Spiritual companioning needs to support people in cultivating those qualities.”

The college marked a milestone in 2002 when Rabbi Dan Ehrenkrantz became the first graduate of RRC to become president. The RRC curriculum continues to be based on its civilizational approach. In addition, the college focuses on developing community and integrating spiritual growth with academic studies.

In 2011 Sandra Lawson became the first openly gay African-American and the first African-American admitted to RRC.

In 2013 Rabbi Deborah Waxman was elected as the President of RRC. As the President, she is believed to be the first woman and first lesbian to lead a Jewish congregational union, and the first female rabbi and first lesbian to lead a Jewish seminary.

In 2015, RRC voted to accept rabbinical students in interfaith relationships, making Reconstructionist Judaism the first type of Judaism to officially allow rabbis in relationships with non-Jewish partners.

== Academics ==
RRC is a graduate institution. Rabbinical and other degree candidate students are required to have a bachelor's degree and meet Hebrew and other requirements before enrolling.

Graduates of the five- to six-year program are required to spend one year studying in Israel before graduating. Graduates receive the title of rabbi and a Master of Arts degree in Hebrew letters.

In conjunction with the rabbinic program, RRC offers joint masters programs in Jewish education and in nonprofit management with Gratz College, a coordinated masters in nonprofit leadership with the University of Pennsylvania, and certificate programs in Congregational and Family Systems and in Marital and Family therapy with the Council for Relationships.

From its early years, RRC included students in decision-making. Representatives of students, alumni, faculty, and administration meet in the College Council, which advises on current issues. In addition, all these groups have representatives on the RRC Board of Governors. Students are members of the Reconstructionist Student Association (RSA).

== Campus ==
The college's main building is 27,500 square feet (2,550 m^{2}) and is red-brick, slate-roofed, and an example of Georgian architecture. It includes classrooms, a lounge, faculty and administrative offices, the Einstein Reconstructionist Archives; a beit midrash (study and discussion hall, also used for religious services); a media center, and conference rooms. The adjacent Goldyne Savad Library Center opened in 1999. The library houses approximately 50,000 books on Judaica, primarily in English, Hebrew, and Yiddish.

== Enrollment and alumni ==
The first graduate of RRC, Michael Luckens, was ordained in 1973. From its second year, 1969, RRC students included women. Sandy Eisenberg Sasso was ordained in 1974, the second woman rabbi in the United States, and the first female Reconstructionist rabbi. Since 1984, RRC has admitted and allowed the ordination of openly gay, bisexual, and lesbian rabbis, the first major rabbinic seminary to do so. As of June 2018, RRC has graduated more than 420 rabbis.

Most RRC graduates are members of the Reconstructionist Rabbinical Association. Approximately half the graduates serve congregations (Reconstructionist, those affiliated with other movements, or unaffiliated). Others serve in academia, in Hillel and campus positions, as civilian and military chaplains, educators, in Jewish agencies, or are employed by the Reconstructionist movement. About one-fifth work in other areas, including as authors, editors, researchers, spiritual counselors, independent rabbis, or are retired. RRC graduates serve Jewish communities in the US, Canada, Australia, France, and Israel.

== College centers ==
The College sponsored three program centers, of which The Center for Jewish Ethics is still in operation:

=== The Center for Jewish Ethics ===
The Center for Jewish Ethics, founded in 1994, helps address the ethical challenges of contemporary life, through the training of future rabbis, hosting of conferences, and publication of ethics-related material.

=== Kolot, The Center for Jewish Women's and Gender Studies ===
Created in 1996, this center worked in both gender and women's studies. Kolot sponsored a variety of publications and seminars. It hosted a Web site for creative Jewish liturgy for holidays and life cycle events. In 2004, Kolot spun off a program for Jewish teenage girls, "Rosh Hodesh: It's a Girl Thing", to "Moving Traditions", a program that promotes a more inclusive and expansive view of gender. Ritualwell is another initiative of Kolot still in operation. The center closed in the mid-2000s.

=== Hiddur, The Center for Aging and Judaism ===
Created in 2003, and closed in 2011, Hiddur's efforts focused on developing spiritual resources and scholarship around aging Jews.

== Notable faculty ==
=== Current faculty ===
- Deborah Waxman, President, Aaron and Marjorie Ziegelman Presidential Professor; Assistant Professor of Contemporary Jewish Thought
- Mordechai Liebling, Director, Social Justice Organizing Program; Instructor of Practical Rabbinics

=== Former faculty ===
- Jack Cohen
- Ira Eisenstein
- Ari Elon
- Arthur Green
- Mordecai Kaplan
- Lori Hope Lefkovitz
- Hershel Matt
- Zalman Schachter-Shalomi
- David Teutsch
- Arthur Waskow

== Notable alumni ==
- Rebecca Alpert, professor at Temple University, author on lesbian rabbis
- Deborah Brin, one of the first openly gay rabbis
- Dan Ehrenkrantz, President of RRC
- Steve Gutow, head of Jewish Council for Public Affairs
- Carol Harris-Shapiro, Temple University lecturer, author of Messianic Judaism: A Rabbi's Journey through Religious Change in America
- Sharon Kleinbaum, rabbi of gay and lesbian oriented Congregation Beit Simchat Torah, on Newsweek's list of leading rabbis, 2008
- Joy Levitt, first female president of a national rabbinical group
- Mordechai Liebling, Director, RRC's Social Justice Organizing Program
- Brant Rosen, congregational rabbi and social justice activist, one of Newsweek's 25 top pulpit rabbis, 2008
- Sandy Eisenberg Sasso, first woman ordained by RRC, author of children’s books.
- Toba Spitzer, president of Reconstructionist Rabbinical Association (2007–09). First open lesbian to head a major rabbinical organization
- Michael Strassfeld., co-editor of The Jewish Catalogue.

== See also ==
- Reconstructionist Judaism
