= Reconstructionist Judaism =

Movement of Rabbinical Judaism

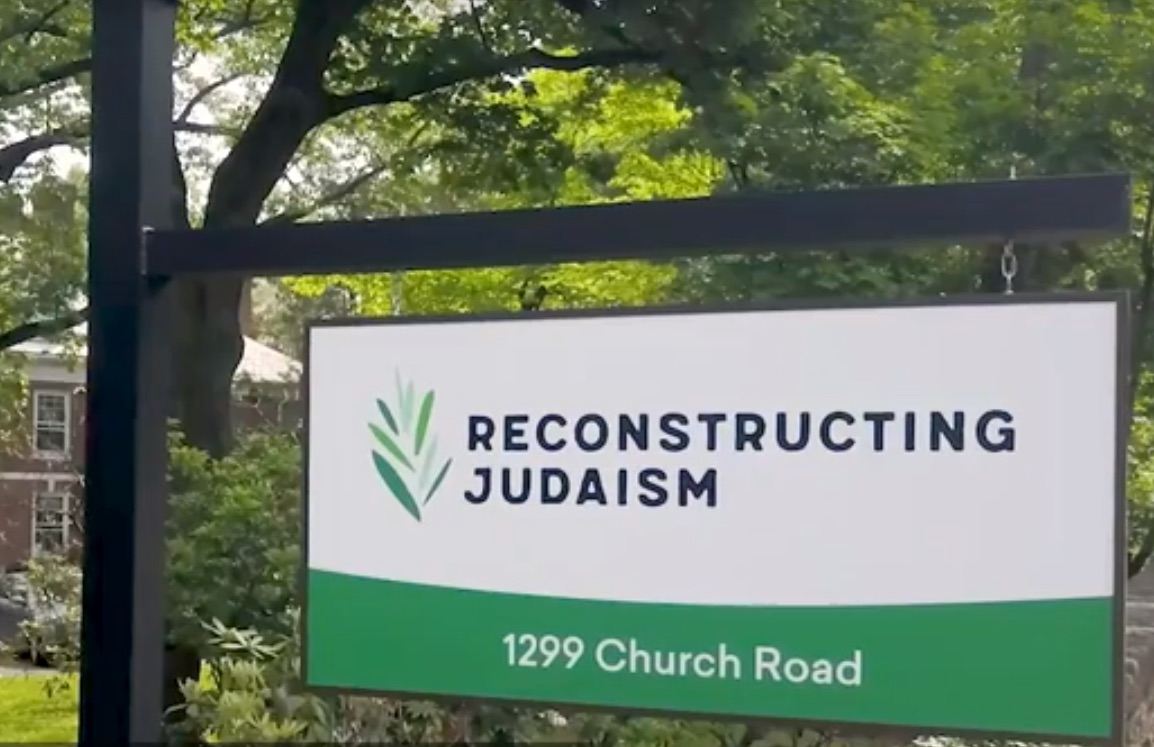
Reconstructing Judaism's organizational headquarters in Wyncote, Pennsylvania

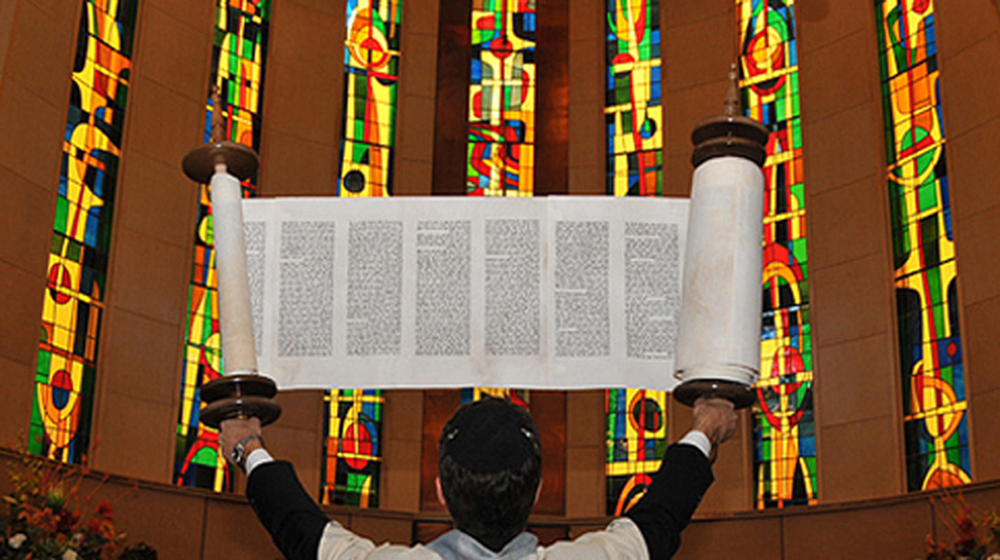
Torah reading at the Congregation Dorshei Emet, Montreal

Reconstructionist Judaism (Note: The central organization of the movement renamed itself to Reconstructing Judaism in 2018, but the ideology's name remains unchanged.) is a Jewish movement based on the concepts developed by Rabbi Mordecai Kaplan (1881–1983)—namely, that Judaism is a progressively evolving civilization rather than just a religion. The movement originated as a semi-organized stream within Conservative Judaism, developed between the late 1920s and the 1940s before seceding in 1955, and established a rabbinical college in 1967. Reconstructionist Judaism is recognized by many scholars as one of the five major streams of Judaism in America alongside Orthodox, Conservative, Reform, and Humanistic.

There is substantial theological diversity within the movement. Halakha (Jewish law) is not considered normative or binding, but rather serves as the basis for the ongoing evolution of meaningful Jewish practice. In contrast with the Reform movement's stance during the time he was writing, Kaplan believed that "Jewish life [is] meaningless without Jewish law." One of the planks he wrote for the proto-Reconstructionist Society for the Jewish Renaissance stated, "We accept the halakha, which is rooted in the Talmud, as the norm of Jewish life, availing ourselves, at the same time, of the method implicit therein to interpret and develop the body of Jewish Law by the actual conditions and spiritual needs of modern life." The movement also emphasizes positive views toward modernity. It has an approach to Jewish customs that aims toward communal decision-making through a process of education and distillation of values from traditional Jewish sources.

The movement's 2011 A Guide to Jewish Practice describes a Reconstructionist approach to Jewish practice as "post-halakhic" because the modern world is one in which Jewish law cannot be enforced. Obligation and spiritual discipline exist without the enforcement of a functioning legal system. Thus, Reconstructionist Jews take Jewish law seriously as a source and resource that can shape expectations while not necessarily seeing themselves as bound by inherited claims of obligation. Therefore, the practices in the guide are not monolithic, and commentators provide further insights, arguments, and alternative approaches that span the broad range of views advocated by Reconstructionist rabbis and scholars. The guide states that it "assumes that thoughtful individuals and committed communities can handle diversity and will of necessity reach their own conclusions."

== Origin ==
Reconstructionism was developed by Rabbi Mordecai Kaplan (1881–1983) and his son-in-law, Ira Eisenstein (1906–2001), between the late 1920s to the 1940s. After being rejected by Orthodox rabbis for his focus on issues in the community and the sociopolitical environment, Kaplan and a group of followers founded the Society for the Advancement of Judaism (SAJ) in 1922. Its goal was to allow rabbis to form new outlooks on Judaism in a more progressive manner. Kaplan was the leader of the SAJ until Eisenstein succeeded him in 1945. In 1935, Kaplan published his book, Judaism as a Civilization: Toward a Reconstruction of American Jewish Life. It was this book that Kaplan claimed was the beginning of the Reconstructionist movement. Judaism as a Civilization suggested that historical Judaism be given a "revaluation... in terms of present-day thought." Reconstructionism was able to spread with several other forms of literature—most notably, the New Haggadah (1941), which for the first time blended Kaplan's ideologies in Jewish ceremonial literature.

Although Kaplan did not want Reconstructionism to branch into another Jewish denomination, it became apparent that such an outcome was inevitable. At the Montreal conference in 1967, Reconstructionist leaders called for a rabbinical school in which rabbis could be ordained under the Reconstructionist ideology and lead Reconstructionist congregations. By the fall of 1968, the Reconstructionist Rabbinical College was opened in Philadelphia. Along with the establishment of the college, the Reconstructionist Rabbinical Association formed, which gave rabbis a strong network in the religious leadership of Reconstructionism. The founding of these institutions were great strides in it becoming the fourth movement in North American Judaism (Orthodox, Conservative, and Reform being the other three).

Reconstructionist Judaism is the first major movement of Judaism to originate in North America; the second is the Humanistic Judaism movement founded in 1963 by Sherwin Wine.

Reconstructionist theology is a variant of the naturalism of John Dewey, which combined atheistic beliefs with religious terminology to construct a religiously satisfying philosophy for those who had lost faith in traditional religion. [See id. at 385; but see Caplan at p. 23, fn.62 ("The majority of Kaplan's views ... were formulated before he read Dewey or [William] James.")]

== Theology ==
Mordecai Kaplan argued that contemporary Jews can no longer maintain many traditional theological claims or sociocultural practices of Judaism due to advances in philosophy, science, and history. Kaplan affirmed his belief in the existence of a wholly non-anthropomorphic God, a position which was articulated by prominent medieval Jewish thinkers like Maimonides and was in agreement with the rest of Rabbinic Judaism. All anthropomorphic descriptions of God, he argued, are understood to be metaphorical.

Kaplan's theology went further by claiming that God is neither a personal god nor a conscious one; God cannot relate to or communicate with humanity in any way. Kaplan's theology defines God as the "sum of all natural processes that allow people to become self-fulfilled"—a religious and spiritual naturalism.

To believe in God means to accept life on the assumption that it harbors conditions in the outer world and drives in the human spirit which together impel man to transcend himself. To believe in God means to take for granted that it is man's destiny to rise above the brute and to eliminate all forms of violence and exploitation from human society. In brief, God is the Power in the cosmos that gives human life the direction that enables the human being to reflect the image of God.

Most "classical" Reconstructionist Jews (i.e., those who agree with Kaplan) reject traditional forms of theism, though this position is by no means universal. Many Reconstructionist Jews are deists, but the movement also includes Jews who hold Kabbalistic, pantheistic, personal, and/or panentheistic views of God. As he explicitly stated, Kaplan's theology does not represent the only Reconstructionist understanding of theology; theology is not the cornerstone of the Reconstructionist movement. Much more central is the belief that Judaism is a Civilization and the belief that the Jewish people must take an active role in ensuring its future by participating in its ongoing evolution.

Consequently, a strain of distinctly non-Kaplanian Reconstructionism exists. In this view, Kaplan's assertions concerning Jewish belief and practice are largely rejected while his principle of Judaism being an "evolving religious civilization" is sustained. The basis for this approach is that Kaplan spoke for his generation; he also wrote that every generation would need to define itself and its civilization for itself. In the thinking of these Reconstructionists, what Kaplan said concerning Jewish belief and practice is inapplicable to the generations of Reconstructionism since his death. As such, non-Kaplanian Reconstructionist Judaism could include belief in a personal God, endorsement of the concept of Jews as the chosen people, a belief in some form of resurrection and/or an afterlife, and adherence to some version of binding halakha. In the latter context, novel interpretations of domains of halakha like kashrut have emerged, such as Eco-Kashrut.

== Jewish law and tradition ==
Reconstructionist Judaism holds that the traditional halakhic system is incapable of producing a code of conduct that is meaningful for, and acceptable to, the vast majority of contemporary Jews, and thus must be reinterpreted in each new time. Unlike classical Reform Judaism, Reconstructionism holds that a person's default position should be to incorporate Jewish laws and tradition into their lives, unless they have a specific reason to do otherwise. However, some Reconstructionists believe that halakha is neither normative nor binding, but are general guidelines.

Reconstructionism promotes many traditional Jewish practices. Thus, the commandments have been replaced with "folkways", non-binding customs that can be democratically accepted or rejected by the congregations. Folkways that are promoted include keeping the Hebrew language in the prayer service, studying Torah, daily prayer, wearing kippot (yarmulkes), tallitot and tefillin during prayer, and observance of the Jewish holidays.

Reconstructionists may use distinct prayer books, such as the Kol haneshamah Hebrew/English Reconstructionist prayer book. Marc Shapiro called attention to the Reconstructionist Kol haneshamah taking liberties with the text, sometimes with an English translation "so blatantly inaccurate that we have no choice but to regard it as a conscious alteration."

== Beliefs ==
In practice, Kaplan's books, especially The Meaning of God in Modern Jewish Religion and Judaism as a Civilization are de facto statements of principle. In 1986, the Reconstructionist Rabbinical Association (RRA) and the Federation of Reconstructionist Congregations and Havurot (FRCH) adopted the official "Platform on Reconstructionism". It is not a mandatory statement of principles, but rather a consensus of current beliefs. Major points of the platform state:

Judaism is the result of natural human development. There is no such thing as divine intervention; Judaism is an evolving religious civilization; Zionism and aliyah (immigration to Israel) are encouraged; Reconstructionist Judaism is based on a democratic community where the laity can make decisions, not just rabbis; The Torah was not inspired by God; it only comes from the social and historical development of Jewish people; The classical view of God is rejected. God is redefined as the sum of natural powers or processes that allows mankind to gain self-fulfillment and moral improvement; The idea that God chose the Jewish people for any purpose, in any way, is "morally untenable", because anyone who has such beliefs "implies the superiority of the elect community and the rejection of others."

Most Reconstructionists do not believe in revelation (the idea that God reveals his will to human beings). This is dismissed as supernaturalism. Kaplan posits that revelation "consists in disengaging from the traditional context those elements in it which answer permanent postulates of human nature, and in integrating them into our own ideology... the rest may be relegated to archaeology".

Many writers have criticized the movement's most widely held theology, religious naturalism. David Ray Griffin and Louis Jacobs have objected to the redefinitions of the terms "revelation" and "God" as being intellectually dishonest, and as being a form of "conversion by definition"; in their critique, these redefinitions take non-theistic beliefs and attach theistic terms to them. Similar critiques have been put forth by Rabbis Neil Gillman, Milton Steinberg, and Michael Samuels.

Reconstructionist Judaism is egalitarian concerning gender roles.

=== Marriage ===
A 1993 resolution allows local synagogues to decide about same-sex marriage.

== Jewish identity ==
Reconstructionist Judaism allows its rabbis to determine their own policy regarding officiating at interfaith marriages. Some congregations accept patrilineal as well as matrilineal descent, and children of one Jewish parent, of any gender, are considered Jewish by birth if raised as Jews. This contrasts with the traditional interpretations of Jewish law of both Rabbinic Judaism, in which a child is Jewish by birth if its mother was Jewish and of Karaite Judaism, in which a child is Jewish by birth if its father was Jewish.

The role of non-Jews in Reconstructionist congregations is a matter of ongoing debate. Practices vary between synagogues. Most congregations strive to strike a balance between inclusivity and the integrity of boundaries. The Jewish Reconstructionist Federation (JRF) has issued a non-binding statement attempting to delineate the process by which congregations set policy on these issues, and sets forth sample recommendations. These issues are ultimately decided by local lay leadership.

In 2015, the Reconstructionist Rabbinical College voted to accept rabbinical students in interfaith relationships, making Reconstructionist Judaism the first type of Judaism officially to allow rabbis in relationships with non-Jewish partners. In making the decision, the movement considered that "many younger progressive Jews, including many rabbis and rabbinical students, now perceive restrictions placed on those who are intermarried as reinforcing a tribalism that feels personally alienating and morally troubling in the 21st century."

In April 2016, nineteen Reconstructionist rabbis announced the formation of Beit Kaplan, originally to protest the decision to allow rabbis to have non-Jewish partners, but more recently to challenge the ordination and inclusion of non-Zionist rabbis. As of July 2025, Beit Kaplan had 92 members.

Although the Reconstructionist movement officially supports liberal Zionism, it also has a disproportionate number of anti-Zionist members. Of the Jewish Voice for Peace rabbinical council, about 60 percent of their members were trained at the Reconstructionist Rabbinical College.

== Organizations ==
Over 100 synagogues and havurot, mostly in the United States and Canada, were affiliated with the Jewish Reconstructionist Federation. As of June 3, 2012, the Reconstructionist movement has been restructured. A joint institution consisting of the Reconstructionist Rabbinical College (RRC) and the congregational organization is now the primary organization of the movement.

The movement's new designation was first "Jewish Reconstructionist Communities," and in 2018 became Reconstructing Judaism. Deborah Waxman was inaugurated as the president of the RRC and Jewish Reconstructionist Communities on October 26, 2014. As the president of the RRC, she is believed to be the first woman and first lesbian to lead a Jewish congregational union, and the first lesbian to lead a Jewish seminary; the RRC is both a congregational union and a seminary. Waxman is a 1999 graduate of RRC.

The RRC educates rabbis. The Reconstructionist Rabbinical Association is the professional organization of Reconstructionist rabbis. The Jewish Reconstructionist youth organization is named No'ar Hadash. Camp Havaya (formerly Camp JRF) in South Sterling, Pennsylvania, is the Reconstructionist movement's summer sleep away camp.

In April 2016, a new Reconstructionist rabbinical organization was formed: Beit Kaplan: The Rabbinic Partnership for Jewish Peoplehood. Originally, Beit Kaplan was focused upon opposing both the decision to allow Reconstructionist rabbis to have non-Jewish partners, and the Boycott, Divestment and Sanctions movement within Reconstructionist circles. Following the 2023 Hamas-led attack on Israel, Beit Kaplan's membership increased to 72 rabbis and rabbinical students in six countries. Presently, Beit Kaplan focuses on a "course correction" to reestablish the Reconstructionist movement's support for Israel and emphasis on the centrality of Jewish peoplehood. As of July 2025, Beit Kaplan had 92 members.

According to the 2010 US Religion Census, there were 41,436 members of Reconstructionist Judaism within 95 synagogues.

As of 2020, the Pew Research Center estimated that Reconstructionist Judaism, along with Humanistic Judaism and other smaller denominations, constituted 4% of the United States's 7.5 million Jews.

== Relationship with other Jewish movements ==
Originally an offshoot of Conservative Judaism, Reconstructionism retains warm relations with Reform Judaism; however, Orthodox Judaism considers Reconstructionism, and every other non-Orthodox denomination, to be in violation of proper observance of interpretation of Jewish law. The Jewish Reconstructionist Federation is a member of the World Union for Progressive Judaism, in which it gained an observer status in 1990.

== See also ==
- Humanistic Judaism
- Jewish secularism
- List of Reconstructionist synagogues

== Bibliography ==
Primary sources

- Kaplan, Mordecai M. (2010) [1934]. Judaism as a Civilization: Toward a Reconstruction of American-Jewish Life. Philadelphia, Pa: JPS Jewish Publication Society. ISBN 978-0-8276-1050-7.
- Kaplan, Mordecai Menahem (1994) [1937]. The meaning of God in modern Jewish religion. Detroit, Mi: Wayne State University Press. ISBN 978-0-8143-3992-3. OCLC 868218906.
- Platform on Reconstructionism, FRCH Newsletter, Sept. 1986, pp. D, E.
- Exploring Judaism: A Reconstructionist Approach, Rebecca Alpert and Jacob J. Staub, The Reconstructionist Press, 1988.

Secondary sources

- David Griffin's article in Jewish Theology and Process Thought, Ed. Sandra B. Lubarsky and David Ray Griffin, SUNY Press, 1996.
- Jacobs, Louis (1990). God, Torah, Israel: Traditionalism Without Fundamentalism. Cincinnati: Hebrew Union College Press.
- Karesh, Sara E.; Hurvitz, Mitchell M. (2005). "Reconstructionist Judaism". Encyclopedia of Judaism. Encyclopedia of World Religions. J. Gordon Melton, Series Editor. New York: Facts On File. pp. 416–418. ISBN 0-8160-5457-6.
- Liebman, Charles S. (1970). "Reconstructionism in American Jewish Life" (PDF). American Jewish Year Book 1971: 3–99.
- Mittleman, Alan (1993). "Modern Jewish Religious Movements". In Wertheimer, Jack (ed.). The Modern Jewish Experience: A Reader's Guide. New York; London: NYU Press. pp. 169–180. ISBN 0-8147-9261-8.
- Neusner, Jacob, ed. (1975). The Sectors of American Judaism: Reform, Orthodoxy, Conservatism, and Reconstructionism. Understanding American Judaism: Toward the Description of a Modern Religion, vol. 2. New York: KTAV Publ. House. ISBN 0870682792.
- Neusner, Jacob, ed. (1993). Conserving Conservative Judaism: Reconstructionist Judaism. Judaism in Cold War America, 1945–1990, vol. 7. New York; London: Garland Publ. ISBN 9780815300786.
- Raphael, Marc Lee (1984). Profiles in American Judaism: the Reform, Conservative, Orthodox, and Reconstructionist traditions in historical perspective. San Francisco, Ca: Harper & Row. ISBN 0-06066801-6.
- Rudavsky, David (1979) [1967]. Modern Jewish Religious Movements: A History of Emancipation and Abjustment (3rd rev. ed.). New York: Behrman House. pp. 347–366. ISBN 0-87441-286-2.
