= Eugene Kohn =

American Reconstructionist rabbi, writer, and editor

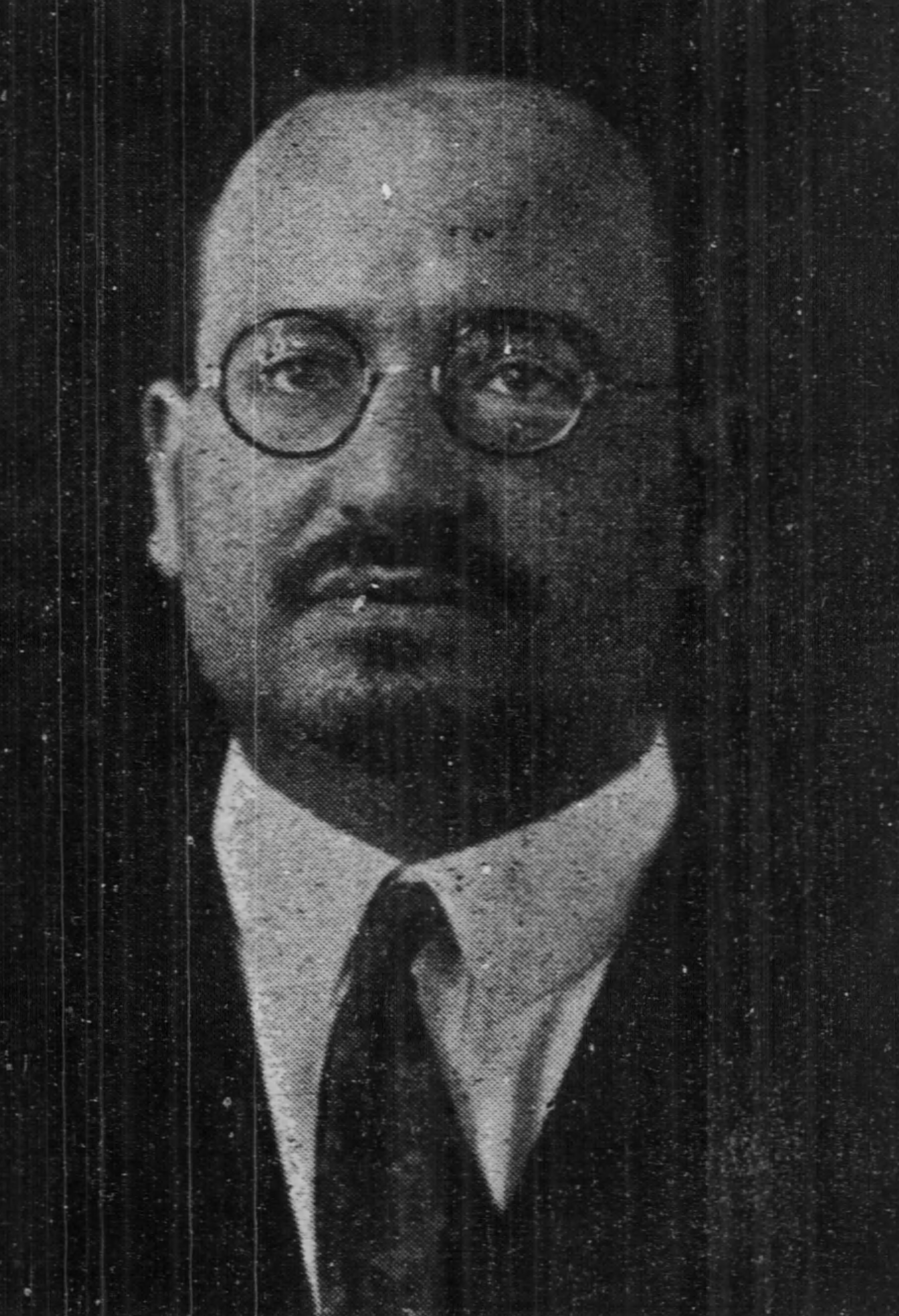
Eugene Kohn, c. 1923

Eugene Kohn (January 26, 1887 – April 1, 1977) was an American Reconstructionist rabbi, writer and editor.

Born in Newark, New Jersey, he attended the Jewish Theological Seminary of America and received ordination in 1912. It was during his studies at the Seminary that he met Rabbi Mordecai Kaplan, who taught him homiletics. Between 1912 and 1939 he served as a congregational rabbi in Conservative synagogues in the U.S. states of Maryland, New Jersey, New York, Wisconsin, and Ohio. He also served as the president of the Conservative movement's Rabbinical Assembly in 1936–1937.

He played a central role in the Reconstructionist movement. He edited its journal, The Reconstructionist, and, alongside Kaplan and Ira Eisenstein, edited The New Haggadah (1941), The Sabbath Prayer Book (1945) and The Reconstructionist Prayer Book (1948). Alongside Jack Cohen, Eisenstein, and Milton Steinberg, he was one of Kaplan's main disciples.

== Works ==
- Manual for Teaching Biblical History (1917)
- The Future of Judaism in America (1934)
- The Future of Judaism in America (1934)
- Religion and Humanity (1953)
- Religious Humanism: A Jewish Interpretation (1953)
- Good to be a Jew (1959)
- Shir Hadash (1939) (edited)
- New Haggadah (1941) (edited)
- The Sabbath Prayer Book (1945) (edited)
- The Reconstructionist Prayer Book (1948) (edited)
- Mordecai M. Kaplan: An Evaluation (1952) (edited)
