= Lake Success Shopping Center =

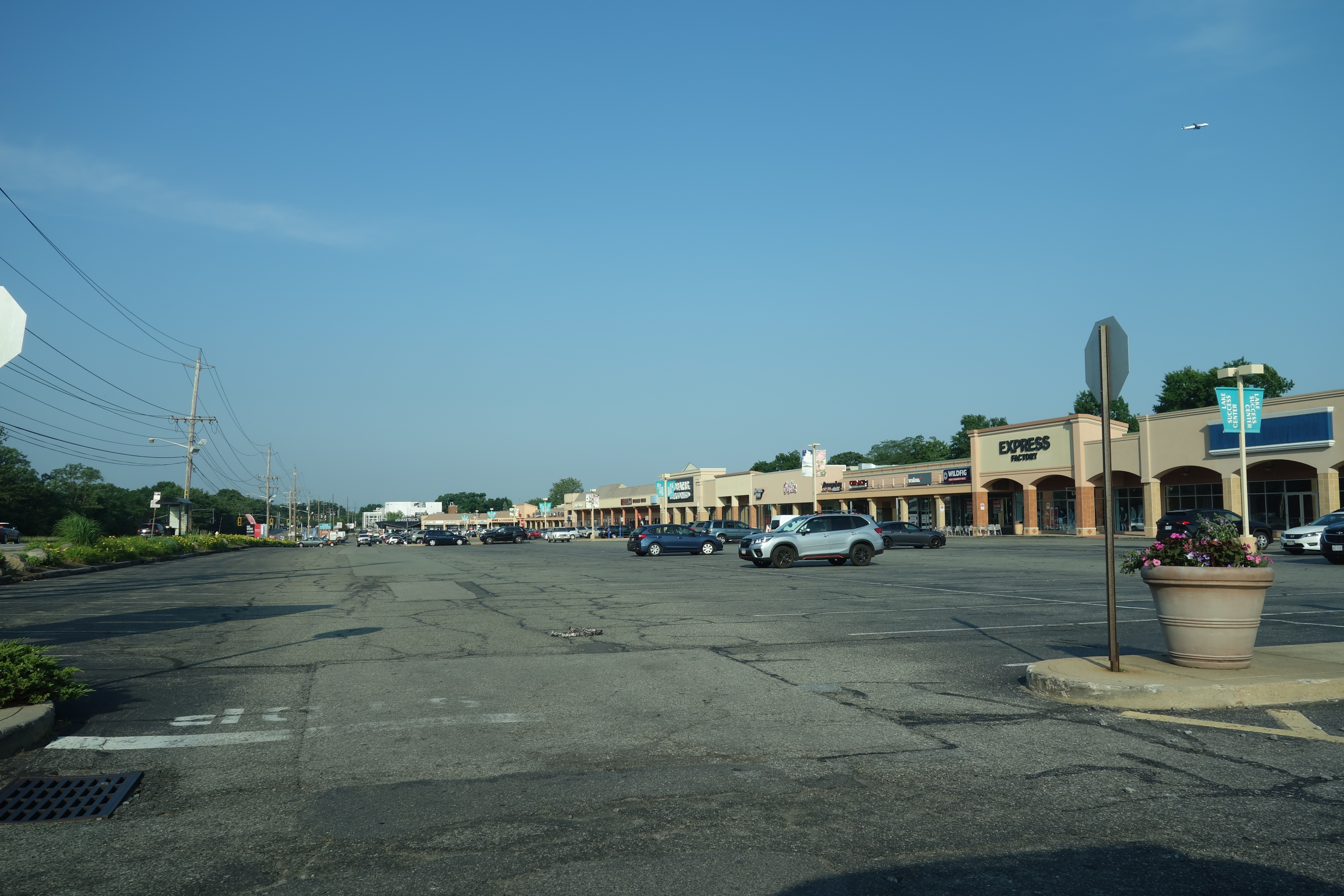
- The shopping center, as seen from the parking lot, in 2021, looking east.
- Location: North New Hyde Park, New York
- Coordinates: 40°45′13″N 73°41′36″W
- Address: 1526 Union Turnpike, New Hyde Park, NY 11040
- Opened: 1956
- Manager: Lake Success Shopping Center LLC
- Architect: A.H. Salkowitz
- Parking: Yes
- Public transit: Nassau Inter-County Express: n25

The Lake Success Shopping Center (also known as the Lake Success Mall) is a major shopping center in North New Hyde Park in the Town of North Hempstead, in Nassau County, New York, United States. It is located on Union Turnpike, just east of Nassau County's border with the New York City borough of Queens. It is managed by Lake Success Shopping Center LLC.

== History ==
The 20-acre (8.1 ha) Lake Success Shopping Center was planned in the early 1950s. Designed by architect A.H. Salkowitz in 1953, the center opened in 1956. It was built and owned by Milton Peck and Arthur Shactman.

Upon opening, the shopping center's major anchor tenants included Namm-Loeser – its largest – and J.C. Penney. Other major, early tenants at the Lake Success Shopping Center included Walgreens, Lanes, S.S. Kresge, and Thom McAn.

On May 25, 1990, Sears opened a new location at the Lake Success Shopping Center, in the former Namm-Loeser space. It was one of two opened that day – the other being in Holbrook, New York – and was the first time Sears opened a new store on Long Island in 7 years.

In the fall of 2015, a Macy's Backstage store opened at the shopping center. It was one of the first Backstage-branded stores the company opened. Also taking place in 2015 was the opening of the shopping center's Shake Shack location, located in the space formerly occupied by Deli King – a Kosher delicatessen – and was the burger chain's second location to open on Long Island.

In 2018, the Sears at the shopping center closed – a result of the company's bankruptcy and subsequent restructuring; the company deemed the location as being unprofitable. It was soon thereafter announced that Target would open a store in the three-story space formerly occupied by the center's Sears. After several delays, it was announced in February 2024 that the Target store will open at some point within the year – and it will also contain a CVS Pharmacy and a Starbucks.

In 2021, the center's Bed Bath & Beyond closed, resulting from its parent company's bankruptcy. Its Modell's also closed around this time, leaving Macy's Backstage, Barnes & Noble and Victoria's Secret/Pink as the largest anchors.

In 2023, it was announced that Burlington Coat Factory, Claire's, Foot Locker, and The Paper Store would all become additional anchor tenants – in addition to a healthcare facility operated by Northwell Health.

In early 2024 it was announced that the center's Target would open that April – and it will also contain a CVS Pharmacy and a Starbucks. It was also announced that, while the Target was originally to occupy the lower two floors of the former Sears, it will instead occupy all three.

== Anchor tenants ==
As of 2024, the Lake Success Shopping Center's current anchor tenants include Barnes & Noble, Burlington Coat Factory, Foot Locker, Macy's Backstage, Sephora, The Paper Store, Target, and Victoria's Secret/Pink – as well as a branch of the USPS New Hyde Park, NY 11040 Post Office.

Previous anchor tenants include Bed Bath & Beyond, Express, Loehmann's, Modell's Sporting Goods, Pier 1 Imports, and Sears.

== Transportation ==
Nassau Inter-County Express (NICE) bus service is available at the Lake Success Shopping Center, with the n25 bus route (Lynbrook LIRR – Great Neck LIRR) making multiple stops in front of the shopping center's western and eastern entrances, along Union Turnpike.

== See also ==
- Americana Manhasset – Another large, outdoor shopping mall in the Town of North Hempstead.
