= Reconstructionist Synagogue of the North Shore =

Reconstructionist synagogue on Long Island

Reconstructionist Synagogue of the North Shore (RSNS)
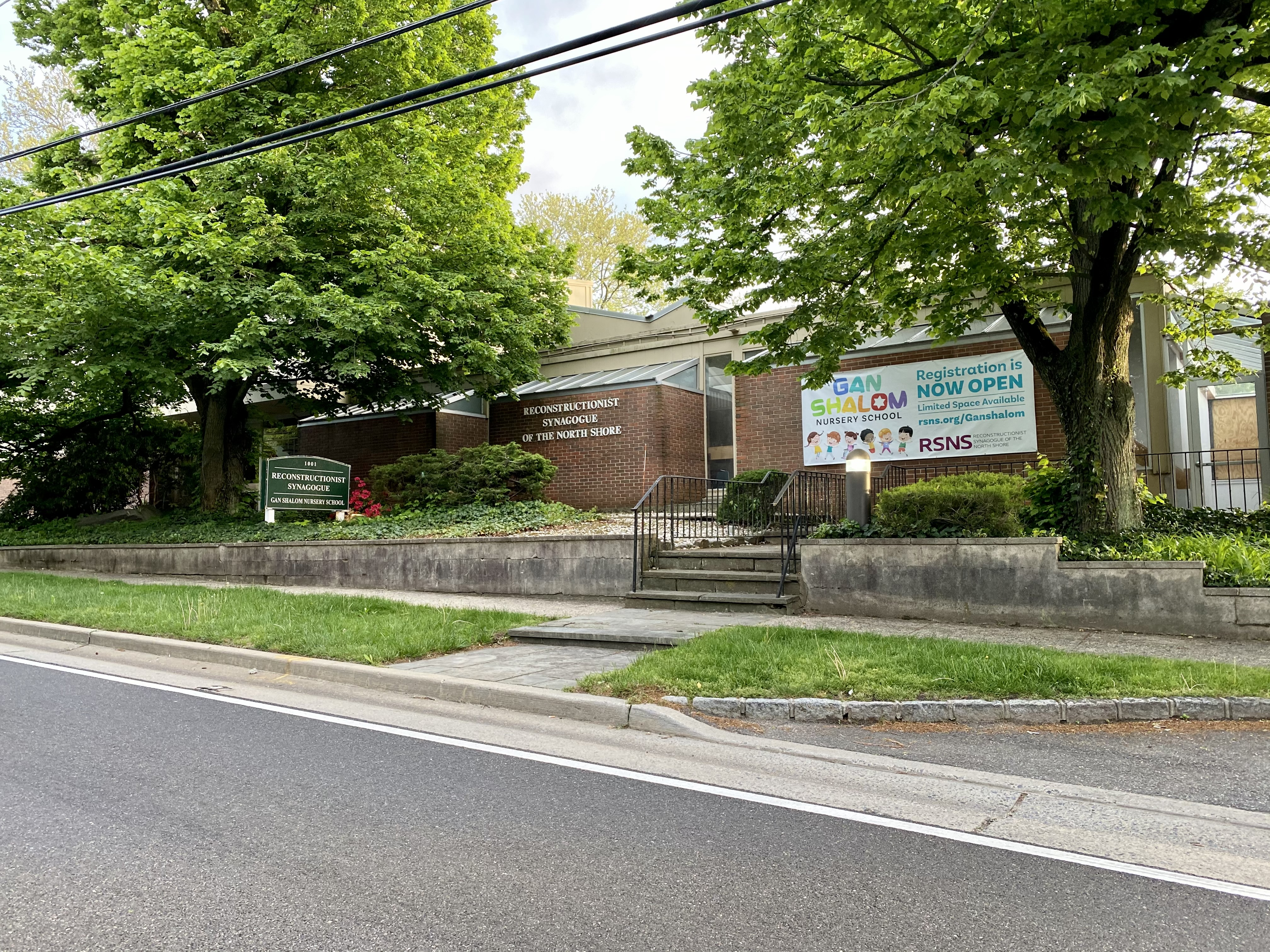
- The Reconstructionist Synagogue in 2021

- Location on Long Island, in New York (state)

Religion
- Affiliation: Reconstructionist Judaism
- Ecclesiastical or organisational status: Synagogue
- Leadership: Rabbi Jodie Siff; Rabbi Lee Friedlander; Rabbi Ira Eisenstein (Emeritus)
- Status: Active

Location
- Location: 1001 Plandome Road, Plandome, New York 11030
- Country: United States
- Coordinates: 40°48′18″N 73°42′25″W

Architecture
- Architects: Charles H. Warner, Jr. (original section); Bentel & Bentel (1967 expansion)
- Style: Mid-century modern
- Founder: Rabbi Ira Eisenstein
- Established: 1950s (as a congregation)
- Completed: 1954 (current building)

Website
- rsns.org

The Reconstructionist Synagogue of the North Shore (also known as RSNS) is a Reconstructionist Jewish synagogue located in the Incorporated Village of Plandome in the Town of North Hempstead, in Nassau County, on the North Shore of Long Island, in New York, United States.

The synagogue is affiliated with the Jewish Reconstructionist Federation.

== History ==
=== 20th century ===
The congregation was first founded as the Jewish Reconstructionist Society of New York in the 1950s by a group of socially-concerned and involved Jewish families. One of the key founders of the congregation was Rabbi Ira Eisenstein, who would also serve as its rabbi. In the 1970s, the society purchased an old mansion for $137,000 on Glenwood Road in Roslyn Harbor, New York with the intention of using it as a synagogue. However, officials and residents in Roslyn Harbor refused to approve of the plans, citing issues with zoning, and the congregation ultimately took the matter to court.

The lawsuit proved unsuccessful, and in 1977, four nearby residents gave the congregation $30,000 to sell the building for use as nothing other than a residence. The mansion was sold, and the congregation then purchased and moved into the Roslyn Union Free School District's former Highland Elementary School in the nearby village of Roslyn Estates that same year.

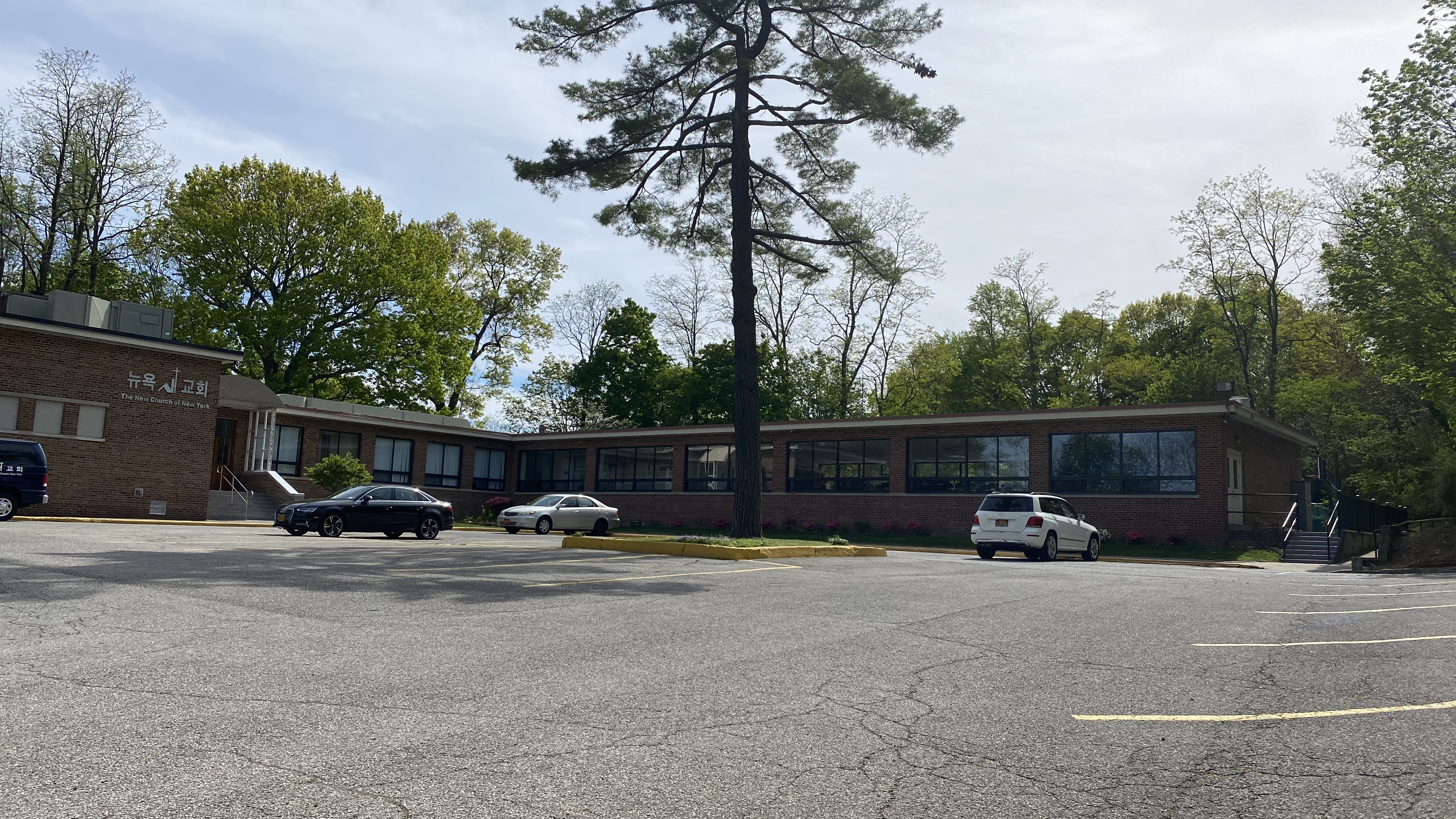
The former Highland School – RSNS's former home from 1977 to 1993 – in 2020

In October 1993, the congregation moved from the former Highland School in Roslyn Estates to its current location – the former Unitarian Universalist Congregation of the North Shore, designed in the mid-century modern style – in Plandome, slightly northwest of Roslyn Estates. The church subsequently relocated to a new location in Manhasset, while the Highland School subsequently became a church.

=== 21st century ===
In 2007, antisemitic graffiti was found on the property. The hate incident shocked many congregants, as this was the first time the congregation was targeted at the Plandome location for 15 years at the time.

When services for the Rosh Hashanah and Yom Kippur were held virtually in 2020 due to the COVID-19 Pandemic, the temple made headlines when cardboard cutouts of congregants filled the seats in the sanctuary. The idea, which was first proposed by congregants Marvin and Barbara Schaffer, was inspired by the cardboard cutouts which the New York Mets filled the seats of Citi Field with.

== Building ==
The present synagogue building was originally constructed as a church in 1954, for the Plandome Unitarian Church (later known as the Unitarian Universalist Congregation of the North Shore); the synagogue purchased the building from the church and moved into it in 1993. The building was designed in the mid-century modern style by architect Charles H. Warner, Jr.; Harold Eliot Leeds served as the consulting designer. The façade primarily consists of brick, glass, and wood.

The original portion of the building was designed with an "H"-shaped floor plan, with the sanctuary, kitchen, and social hall on one side and classrooms and offices on the other; the two legs are connected by the lobby and indoor breezeway with floor-to-ceiling windows adjacent to a courtyard.

A large addition to the building was constructed in the 1960s; it was completed in 1967, at a cost of $210,000 (1967 USD). Designed by Bentel & Bentel, this expansion consists of several classrooms and a smaller social and prayer room; these classrooms feature cathedral ceilings and sloped roofs, with façades of brick and glass and wood trim and interiors designed to augment and maximize light, complete with globe lighting and patios.

== Clergy ==
As of September 2026, the congregation is led by Rabbis Jodie Siff and Lee Friedlander, supported by the late Ira Eisenstein – the synagogue's Rabbi Emeritus. The cantor is Eric Schulmiller.

== Notable members ==
- Judith Kaplan Eisenstein – Author, musicologist, theologian, and wife to Ira Eisenstein; first Jewish woman to publicly celebrate a bat mitzvah in the United States, at the encouragement of her father, Mordecai Kaplan.

== See also ==
- Reconstructionist Judaism
- List of synagogues in the United States
- Temple Beth-El (Great Neck, New York)
- Temple Beth Israel (Port Washington, New York)
- Temple Beth Sholom (Roslyn, New York)
- Temple Sinai (Roslyn, New York)
- The Community Synagogue
