= Ira Eisenstein =

American rabbi (1906 – 2001)

Rabbi Ira Eisenstein

Personal life
- Born: November 26, 1906
- Died: June 28, 2001 (aged 94)
- Spouse: Judith Kaplan
- Education: Columbia University

Religious life
- Religion: Judaism

Jewish leader
- Synagogue: Society for the Advancement of Judaism
- Semikhah: Jewish Theological Seminary

Ira Eisenstein (November 26, 1906 – June 28, 2001) was an American rabbi who, along with his mentor and—through his marriage to Judith Kaplan—father-in-law, Rabbi Mordecai Kaplan, founded Reconstructionist Judaism over a period spanning the late 1920s through the 1940s. Reconstructionist Judaism formally became an independent denomination within Judaism with the foundation of the Reconstructionist Rabbinical College in 1968—for which Eisenstein served as founding president.

== Biography ==
A native of Manhattan, New York, Rabbi Eisenstein obtained his bachelor's and doctoral degrees from Columbia University. In 1931, he was ordained by the Jewish Theological Seminary (JTS); during his studies, he met and married Judith Kaplan, the daughter of JTS faculty member Rabbi Mordecai Kaplan.

After his ordination, Rabbi Eisenstein became an associate rabbi and then senior rabbi of the Society for the Advancement of Judaism—the first Reconstructionist congregation—that Rabbi Kaplan had founded in 1922. He also served as the religious leader of the Anshe Emet Synagogue in Chicago and the Reconstructionist Synagogue of the North Shore on Long Island, N.Y.

A former president of Conservative Judaism's Rabbinical Assembly of America, Rabbi Eisenstein served as president of the Jewish Reconstructionist Federation from 1959 to 1970. From 1935 to 1981, he was editor of The Reconstructionist, the movement's magazine.

Alongside Rabbis Jack Cohen, Milton Steinberg, and Eugene Kohn, Eisenstein was one of Kaplan's main disciples.

Ira Eisenstein was the grandson of Julius (Judah D.) Eisenstein.

== Works ==
- Creative Judaism (1941)
- The Ethics of Toleration Applied to Religious Groups in America (1941)
- Judaism Under Freedom (1956)
- What We Mean by Religion (1958)
- Varieties of Jewish Belief (1966)
- Reconstructing Judaism: An Autobiography (1986)
