= Julius Eisenstein =

Polish-American anthologist (1854–1956)

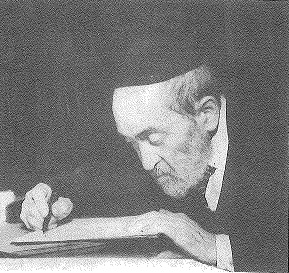
- J.D. Eisenstein, Orthodox Jewish scholar
- Born: November 12, 1854; Międzyrzec Podlaski, Congress Poland
- Died: May 17, 1956 (aged 101); New York City, New York
- Resting place: Queens, New York City, New York
- Other names: Judah David Eisenstein, the Ba'al ha-Otzrot
- Known for: Hebrew language anthologies, editor of the first Hebrew encyclopedia
- Spouse: Rebecca Eisenstein (née Cohen)
- Children: Four sons, five daughters
- Parent(s): Zeev Wolf Eisenstein and Toba Bluma Eisenstein (née Barg)
- Relatives: Ira Eisenstein, Harry Fishbein

Signature
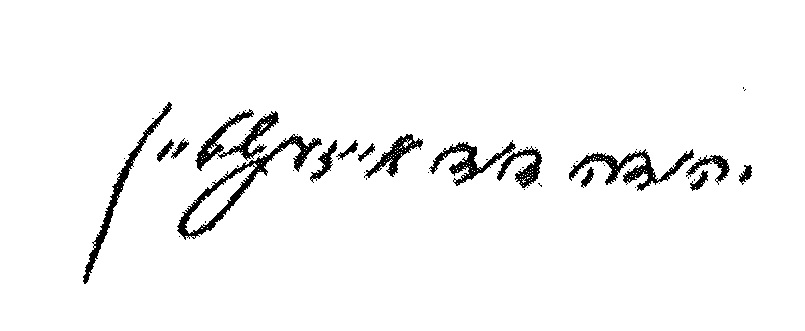

Julius (Judah David) Eisenstein (November 12, 1854 – May 17, 1956) (Hebrew: יהודה דוד אייזנשטיין) was a Polish-Jewish-American anthologist, diarist, encyclopedist, Hebraist, historian, philanthropist, and Orthodox polemicist born in Międzyrzec Podlaski (known in Yiddish as Mezritch d'Lita), a town with a large Jewish majority in what was then Congress Poland. He died in New York City at the age of 101.

== Lineage, education and early years ==
Yehuda Dovid Eizensztejn, as he was named at birth, was the second of two children born to Rabbi Zeev Wolf and Toba Bluma (née Barg). His sister, Henna, was a year and a half older. When he was ten years old, his father became the first Jew from Mezritch to emigrate to the United States.

As a child, therefore, his education in Talmud was left to his paternal grandfather, Azriel Zelig, the son of Noson Neta Eizensztejn, a Talmudic scholar and dyer of indigo originally from the village of Stawiska (in Yiddish, Stavisk). His antecedents had moved there from Königsberg and claimed to be direct descendants of Rashi.

In 1872, Toba Bluma emigrated to the United States with her son and daughter and joined Zeev Wolf in New York. There, Yehuda Dovid anglicized his first name to Julius and adopted the American spelling of his family name. He married the following year.

Eisenstein's parents eventually divorced, after which his father made aliyah to Jerusalem, where he remarried and raised a second family. Both Zeev Wolf and Toiba Bluma's family were proto-Zionists. Her maternal grandfather, Rabbi Tzvi Zeev (in Yiddish, Hirsch Wolf) Fiszbejn, had already moved to Jerusalem with his two sons, Abraham and Isaac, and other descendants in 1863. Tzvi Zeev was a wealthy brush manufacturer in Mezritch and financed the construction of the original Etz Chaim Yeshiva in the Old City. They and Zeev Wolf are all buried near each other in the Mount of Olives Jewish Cemetery.

== Hebraist and historian ==
Eisenstein loved Hebrew and established America's first society for the Hebrew language, Shoharei Sfat Ever. He was also the first to translate the Constitution of the United States into Hebrew and Yiddish (New York, 1891). Other early writings of his are Ma'amarei BaMasoret, ib. 1897, and The Classified Psalter (Pesukei dezimra), a Hebrew text with a new translation (1899). He also attempted to translate and explain a modified text of the Shulchan Aruch.

In HaModi'a laHadashim (New York) for 1901, he published, under the title LeDorot Golei Russiya b'America, a sketch of the history of Russo-Jewish emigration to America. His History of the First Russo-American Jewish Congregation appeared in No. 9 of the Publications of the American Jewish Historical Society, in 1901.

== Primary works ==
Eisenstein contributed more than 150 entries to the 1901–1906 Jewish Encyclopedia, from which much of the above biography was based, and he authored thousands of articles in newspapers, journals, encyclopedias, and anthologies.

His memories are contained in a 1929 volume called Otzar Zikhronotai (אוצר זיכרונותי).

Other works, most of which can be downloaded at HebrewBooks.org are as follows:

- Otzar Perushim we-Ziyurim (1920) (אוצר פירושים וציורים להגדה של פסח), an illustrated Passover haggadah
- Otzar Dinim u-Minhagim (1917) (אוצר דינים ומנהגים), a digest of Jewish laws (halakha) and customs (minhagim)
- Otzar D'rushim Nibharim (1918) (אוצר דרושים נבחרים), an anthology of midrashic literature
- Otzar Maamare Hazal (1922) (אוצר מאמרי חז"ל), a concordance of rabbinical quotations, sayings and phrases
- Otzar Ma'amare Tanakh (1925) (אוצר מאמרי התנ"ך), a concordance of words, phrases and idioms in the Tanakh
- Otzar Masa'oth (1927) (אוצר מסעות), an anthology of itineraries by Jewish travelers to Palestine, Syria, Egypt, and other countries
- Otzar Midrashim (1915) (אוצר מדרשים), "Anthology of Midrashim," a library of 200 minor midrashim
- Otzar Vikukhim (1922) (אוצר ויכוחים), "Anthology of Debates," a collection of polemics and disputations with Christianity
- Otzar Yisrael (principal editor, 1906–1913, 10 volumes) (אנציקלופדיה אוצר ישראל), which has the distinction of being the first comprehensive (i.e., not restricted exclusively to Jewish topics) encyclopedia in the Hebrew language. Eisenstein undertook this work in response to perceived limitations of the English-language Jewish Encyclopedia.

For obvious reasons, he was known by many colleagues as the Ba'al ha-Otzrot ("Master of the Anthologies"). His works remain standard reference books in yeshivot, batei midrash, synagogues, and Jewish libraries to this day.

== Philanthropist and polemicist ==
Eisenstein first visited the Land of Israel in 1899 via Egypt, where he met with local Jewish communities in Alexandria and Cairo. After arriving in Jaffa, he toured fledgling Zionist villages, including Rishon LeZion, Rehovot, and Petah Tikva, and reunited with his father in Jerusalem. Among other consumables, he brought ten thousand liters of American flour, which he sold without profit, half in Jaffa and half in Jerusalem. This marked the first time American flour was imported into the country. Until then, higher-cost Russian flour was imported via Odessa, and its price often placed it beyond the reach of many poor people.

In 1926, Eisenstein sailed a second time to the Land of Israel via Europe, docking in Haifa. He visited Tel Aviv, Bnei Brak, and Petah Tikva, as well as the holy cities of Hebron, Tiberias, Safed, and Jerusalem, where he paid his respects at the graves of his father, great-grandfather, and great-uncles. During his stay, he met with a significant number of rabbis representing every spectrum of Orthodoxy, from Abraham Isaac Kook, the first Ashkenazi chief rabbi of British Mandatory Palestine, to Yosef Chaim Sonnenfeld, co-founder of the Edah HaChareidis.

Back in America, Eisenstein took a prominent part in the controversy concerning the Kolel America, a society for the collection of funds for the poor Jews of Palestine, and was one of the leaders in the movement to arrange that the money contributed in the United States should go primarily to former residents of America.

His political views were marked by hostility toward Reform and Conservative Judaism.

Though Eisenstein became widely read as a writer, he was less successful as a businessman and lost much of his fortune in a failed effort to establish an agricultural colony for Jewish immigrants in New Jersey.

== Family ==
Eisenstein and his wife, Rebecca (née Cohen), were the parents of nine children: Isaac (1875-1961), Nathan (1878-1952), Miriam (1882-1969), Lilly (1885-1916), Selig (1886-1978), Birdie (1888-1984), Rose (1891-1984), and Benedict (1894-1983). The ninth, a daughter, Hattie, died from diphtheria at the age of three.

His grandson, Ira Eisenstein, who did not inherit his grandfather's outlook, was ordained a Conservative rabbi and is considered one of the founders of Reconstructionist Judaism. Eisenstein was also a second cousin of American champion bridge player Harry Fishbein. Popular kosher cookbook author Susie Fishbein is married to a second cousin thrice-removed.
