= Society for the Advancement of Judaism =

Society for the Advancement of Judaism (SAJ)
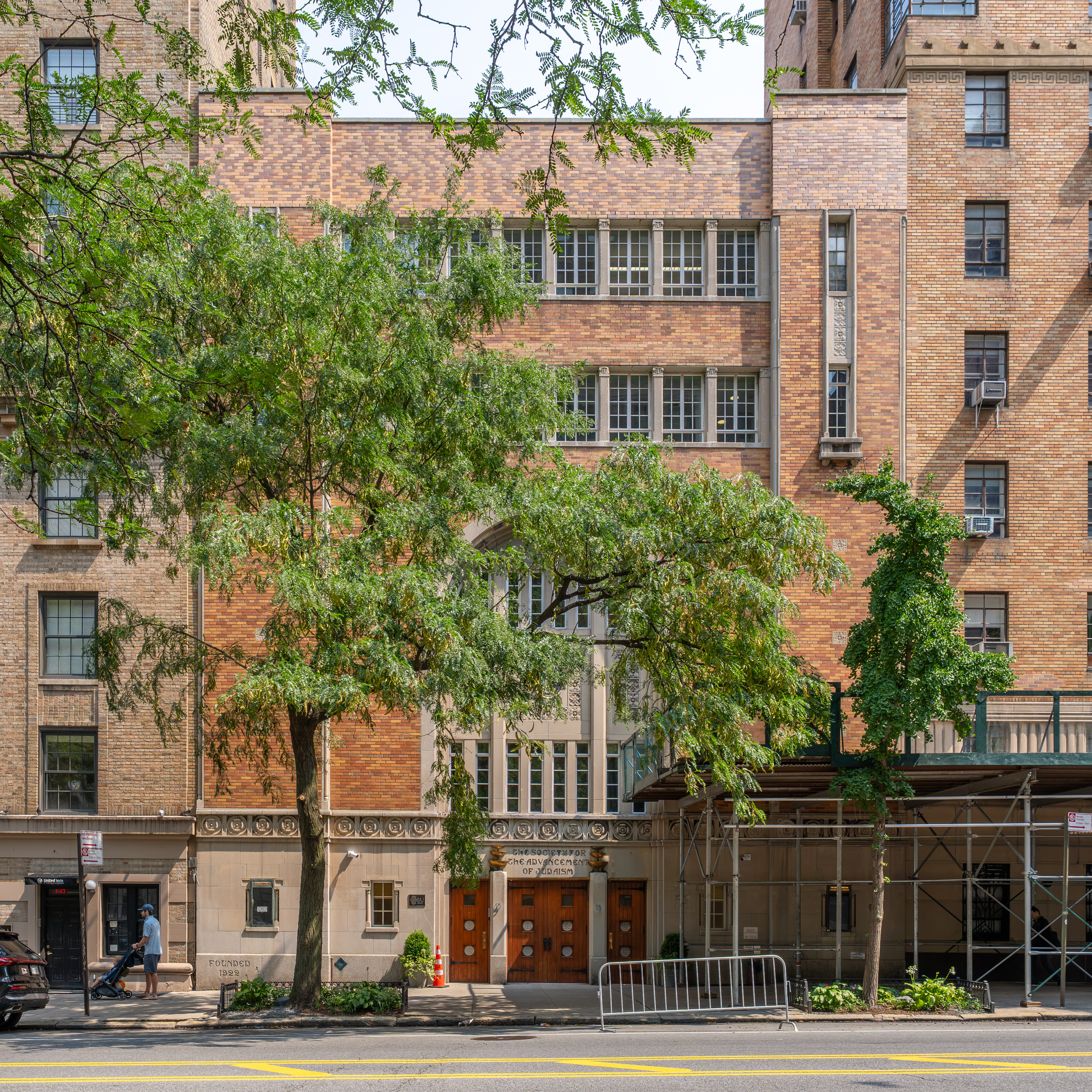
- The SAJ synagogue in Manhattan (2026)

- Location in Manhattan

Religion
- Affiliation: Reconstructionist Judaism
- Ecclesiastical or organisational status: Synagogue
- Leadership: Rabbi Lauren Grabelle Herrmann; Rabbi Michael Strassfeld (Emeritus)
- Status: Active

Location
- Location: 15 West 86th Street, Upper West Side, Manhattan, New York City
- Country: United States
- Coordinates: 40°47′09″N 73°58′12″W

Architecture
- Founder: Rabbi Mordecai M. Kaplan
- Established: 1922

Website
- www.thesaj.org

The Society for the Advancement of Judaism, also known as SAJ, is an American Reconstructionist synagogue and Jewish organization in New York City, on Manhattan's Upper West Side. Founded in 1922 by Mordecai M. Kaplan, the rabbi who founded Reconstructionist Judaism, the synagogue is affiliated with the movement.

The current rabbi is Lauren Grabelle Herrmann, who succeeded Michael Strassfeld on July 1, 2015.

== History ==
SAJ was founded by Mordecai Kaplan in order to put into practice his conception of Judaism as an evolving civilization. At the dedication of SAJ's new building in 1926, Kaplan explained the goals of the Reconstructionist Movement in general and the SAJ in particular in the form of the "Thirteen Wants"

The first American Bat Mitzvah was held at the Society for the Advancement of Judaism on Saturday morning, March 18, 1922, for Judith Kaplan, daughter of Rabbi Mordecai Kaplan.

In 1927, the board of SAJ voted to replace the Kol Nidre prayer with Psalm 150 in the liturgy for the Yom Kippur service. Rabbi Mordecai Kaplan justified the change, arguing that the actual text of Kol Nidre was overly legalistic and not in keeping with the spirit of the Yom Kippur holiday. Lack of satisfaction from congregants later pushed Rabbi Kaplan to restore the recitation of Kol Nidre. However, despite reintroducing Kol Nidre, Rabbi Kaplan added a line to the prayer that specified that only vows that "estrange ourselves from those who have offended us, or to give pain to those who have angered us" should be annulled by the recitation.

In 1945, Rabbi Mordecai Kaplan, along with Rabbis Ira Eisenstein and Eugene Kohn published the Sabbath Prayer Book. The publication of this siddur led the Union of Orthodox Rabbis to issue a herem against Rabbi Kaplan. In the wake of this controversy, Rabbi Kaplan gave a lecture at SAJ entitled "Excommunication vs. Freedom of Worship" and advertised it in the New York Times. The herem also caused controversy for the synagogue including causing one of its secretaries to resign.

After Michael Strassfeld became the Rabbi at SAJ in 2001, SAJ ended its dual affiliation with the Reconstructionist and Conservative movements, becoming solely affiliated with the Jewish Reconstructionist Federation.

== Notable clergy and members ==
=== Clergy ===
==== Former Rabbis ====
- Rabbi Mordecai Kaplan, founder of SAJ and Reconstructionist Judaism
- Rabbi Ira Eisenstein, founder of the Reconstructionist Rabbinical College

==== Former Cantors ====
- Moshe Nathanson, composer of Hava Nagilah

=== Notable Current or Former Members ===
- Mimi Levin Lieber, pioneer of focus groups
- Judith Kaplan Eisenstein, author, composer and first girl to celebrate a Bat Mitzvah
- Frieda Schiff Warburg, philanthropist
- Felix Warburg, banker
- Arnold Richards, psychoanalyst and Yiddish cultural organizer
