= Temple Beth Israel (Port Washington, New York) =

- Hebrew: בית ישראל
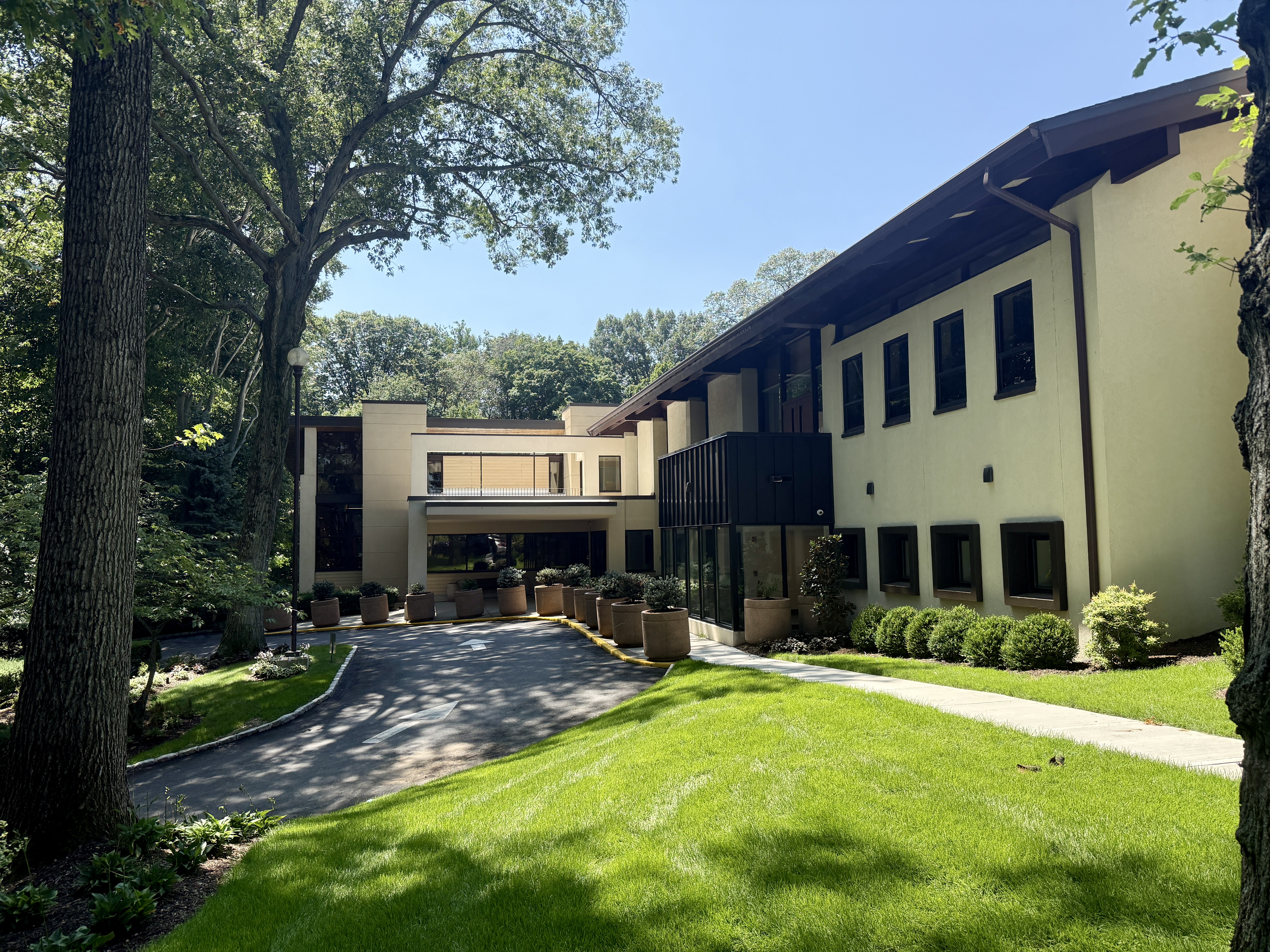
- Temple Beth Israel in 2026

- Location on Long Island, New York

Religion
- Affiliation: Conservative Judaism
- Ecclesiastical or organisational status: Synagogue
- Leadership: Rabbi Michael Mishkin
- Status: Active

Location
- Location: Temple Drive, Port Washington, Long Island, New York
- Country: United States
- Administration: United Synagogue of Conservative Judaism
- Coordinates: 40°49′12″N 73°41′15″W

Architecture
- Architect: Percival Goodman
- Type: Synagogue
- Style: Modernist
- Established: 1933 (as a congregation)
- Completed: 1962

Website
- tbiport.org

Temple Beth Israel (Hebrew: בית ישראל) is a Conservative synagogue located on Temple Drive in Port Washington, on Long Island, New York, in the United States.

== Overview ==
The congregation was founded in 1933. It is affiliated with the United Synagogue of Conservative Judaism and is the oldest synagogue located in Port Washington.

The congregation initially met in a rented location at Shore Road and Main Street, and in 1938 purchased a building at 138 Bayview Avenue. Its current building was designed by Percival Goodman in 1960, and dedicated in 1962.

Robert E. Fine joined as rabbi in 2007. He was succeeded by Michael Mishkin in August 2009.

== See also ==
- Conservative Judaism
- List of synagogues in the United States
- Reconstructionist Synagogue of the North Shore
- Temple Beth Sholom (Roslyn, New York)
