= Arlene Kramer Richards =

American psychoanalyst and author

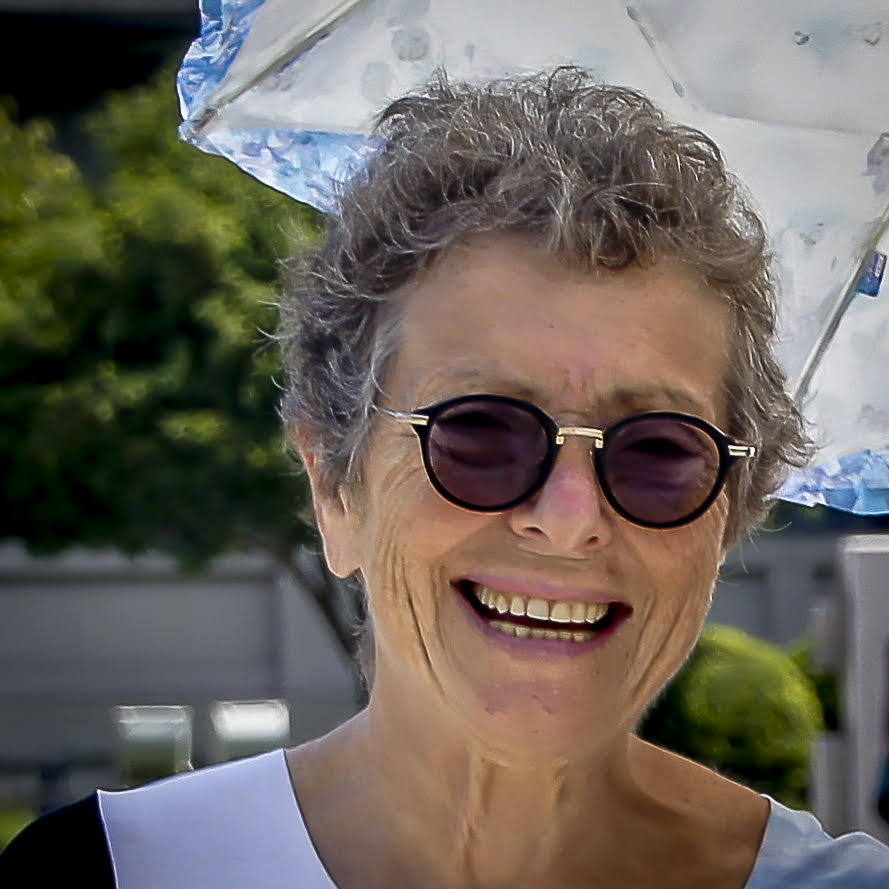
- Education: University of Chicago, Columbia University
- Occupations: psychoanalyst, author
- Spouse: Arnold Richards

Arlene Kramer Richards (born June 1935) is a practicing psychoanalyst and author based in New York City. She has written seven children books and papers on female sexuality, perversion and gambling.

== Career ==
Kramer Richards is a training and supervising analyst of the New York Freudian Society and International Psychoanalytical Association. She additionally serves as a councilor at the American Psychoanalytic Association.

She has taught at the Smith College School for Social Work, the Silver School of Social Work at NYU, IPTAR, American Institute for Psychoanalysis (AIP), and at the Tongji Medical College of Huazhong University of Science and Technology at Wuhan, China.

=== Writing and research ===
In 1997, she presented on primary femininity and female genital anxiety for the American Journal of Psychoanalysis.

== Personal life ==
Arlene Kramer Richards lives in Palm Beach, Florida with her husband Arnold Richards.

== Selected publications ==
- Myths of Mighty Women. With Lucille Spira. London: Karnac 2015
- Psychoanalysis: Listening to Understand. Selected Papers of Arlene Kramer Richards Nancy Goodman Ed. New York: IPBOOKS 2013
- Encounters With Loneliness: Only the Lonely. With Arthur A. Lynch& Lucille Spira Eds. New York: IPBOOKS 2013
- The Perverse Transference and Other Matters: Essays in Honor of Horacio Etchegoyen. With Jorge L. Ahumada, Jorge Oligaray & Arnold D. Richards, Eds. New York: Aronson. 1997.
- The Spectrum of Psychoanalysis: Essays in Honor of Martin Bergmann with Arnold D. Richards (eds.) Madison, Conn.: International Universities Press. 1994.
- Dream Portrait: A Study of Nineteen Sequential Dreams as Indicators of Pretermination. With A. Bond and D. Franco. et al. International Universities Press. 1992.
- Fantasy, Myth and Reality: Essays in Honor of Jacob A. Arlow. New York: International Universities Press. 1988. Edited with H. Blum, Y. Kramer and A.D. Richards.
- Blood. In: The Power of Witnessing: Reflections, Reverberations, and Traces of the Holocaust eds. Nancy R. Goodman and Marilyn B. Meyers New York: Routledge 2012.
- Little boy lost. In: Mourning in the Analyst. ed. Kerry Malawista & Anne Adelman. In Press.
- Rage and Creativity: Second Wave Feminists and the Rejection of “Freudian” Thinking. Mind and Human Interaction 2003 13:145-155.
- Fruitful Uses of Telephone Analysis. Insight: International Psychoanalytical Association. 2003, pp. 30–33.

== Bibliography ==
- Boy Friends, Girl Friends, Just Friends (1978)
- What to Do If You or Someone You Know Is Under 18 and Pregnant (1983)
- How to Get It Together When Your Parents Are Coming Apart (1986)
- Fantasy, Myth, & Reality: Essays in Honor of Jacob A. Arlow (1988)
- The Spectrum of Psychoanalysis: Essays in Honor of Martin S. Bergmann (1994)
- Encounters with Loneliness: Only the Lonely (2012)
- Psychoanalysis: Listening to Understand: Selected Papers of Arlene Kramer Richards (2013)
