= Temple Beth Sholom (Roslyn, New York) =

Synagogue in Nassau County, New York, United States

- Location on Long Island, New York

Religion
- Affiliation: Conservative Judaism
- Ecclesiastical or organisational status: Synagogue
- Leadership: Rabbi David J. Lerner
- Status: Active

Location
- Location: 401 Roslyn Road, Roslyn Heights, NY 11577
- Municipality: Incorporated Village of East Hills
- Country: United States
- Administration: United Synagogue of Conservative Judaism
- Coordinates: 40°46′56″N 73°38′18″W

Architecture
- Architect: Percival Goodman
- Type: Synagogue
- Established: 1951 (as a congregation)
- Completed: 1952

Website
- tbsroslyn.org

Temple Beth Sholom (also known as Temple Beth Sholom of Roslyn) is a Conservative synagogue located at 401 Roslyn Road in the Incorporated Village of East Hills, on Long Island, New York, United States, in the Greater Roslyn area.

== Overview ==
The congregation was established in 1951. It is affiliated with the United Synagogue of Conservative Judaism, and is among the oldest synagogues in the Greater Roslyn area, which is anchored by the Incorporated Village of Roslyn.

The synagogue building was originally designed by Percival Goodman. Later projects and additions would be designed by longtime congregant Abraham Salkowitz, who was alao a resident of East Hills. When designing the sanctuary at Temple Beth Sholom, Goodman took significant inspiration from the geometric design of Frank Lloyd Wright's Beth Sholom Synagogue in Elkins Park, Pennsylvania; Goodman largely modeled the sanctuary at Temple Beth Sholom off of that synagogue's sanctuary.

As of 2026, the congregation's rabbi is David J. Lerner.

== History ==
Temple Beth Sholom was founded at the in June 1951 by approximately 30 families. It was created after splitting from the Roslyn Jewish Community Center – established in 1947 as an interdenominational congregation for Roslyn's growing Jewish community – that month, following the majority of the center's members electing to affiliate the center with Reform Judaism in 1950, and would change its name to Temple Sinai in 1952; the congregants who would found Temple Beth Sholom, meanwhile, wished to affiliate with Conservative Judaism. After holding early meetings at the Roslyn Country Club, the congregation purchased its property on Roslyn Road in 1951.

Prior to the completion of its permanent home on Roslyn Road, the congregation met in other locations in the community. On Friday, August 3 of that year, Temple Beth Sholom's first service – a Shabbat evening service – was held at Fellows Fall in the Village of Roslyn.

In 1952, the first wing of the permanent synagogue building opened. Its dedication ceremony would take place at the synagogue on September 14, 1952, featuring Congressman Leonard Hall as a guest speaker. The building would be expanded and modernized numerous times in the years and decades that followed – including a renovation between 1990 and 1992, in time for the congregation's 40th Anniversary.

== Notable congregants ==
- Abraham Salkowitz – Architect.

== See also ==
- Conservative Judaism
- List of synagogues in the United States
- Reconstructionist Synagogue of the North Shore
- Temple Beth Israel (Port Washington, New York)
