= Jack Cohen (rabbi) =

Israeli-American Reconstructionist rabbi

- ג'ק כהן
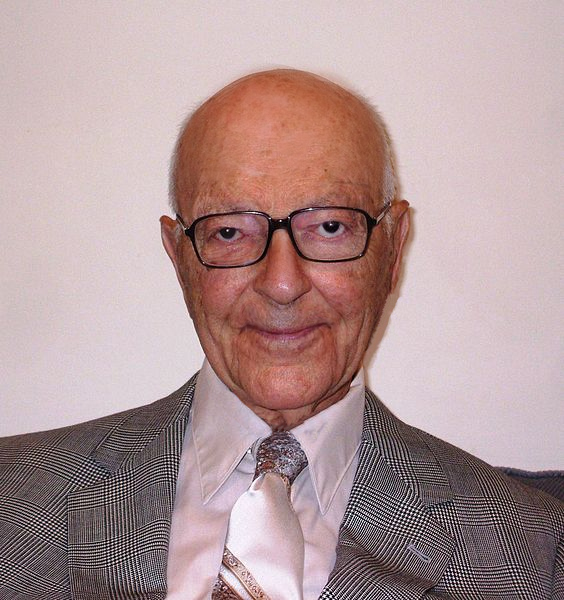
- Born: Jack Josef Cohen; March 21, 1919; Brooklyn, New York
- Died: April 16, 2012 (aged 93); Jerusalem, Israel
- Occupations: Reconstructionist rabbi, educator, author
- Spouse: Rhoda (Levine)

Jack Cohen (Hebrew: ג'ק כהן; March 21, 1919– April 16, 2012) was an Israeli-American Reconstructionist rabbi, educator, philosopher and author. Cohen held a PhD from Columbia University in the philosophy of education. In 1943 he was ordained as a rabbi by the Jewish Theological Seminary of America (JTS) and, soon after, started to teach courses there. Cohen was one of the distinguished students of Rabbi Mordecai Kaplan, the founder of Reconstructionist Judaism, and was one of the founders of Kehillat Mevakshei Derech, a synagogue in Israel. Cohen was Honorary Chairman at Kaplan Center for Jewish Peoplehood and director of the Hillel Foundation at the Hebrew University for 23 years.

== Biography ==
Jack Joseph Cohen was born on March 21, 1919, in Brooklyn, New York, to Isidor and Helen, the first of three children. At the age of 17, when working in a synagogue, he first met Rhoda, his future wife, who was then 11 years old. In 1945, the two got married. Cohen was an outstanding student, he graduated from high school at the age of 15 and immediately started his studies for a bachelor's degree in podiatry. After a few months, during his studies, he dedicated a great deal of time to studies in the JTS. In addition, he was involved in political activities. In 1940, Jack Cohen graduated from Brooklyn College DPM and the same year, at JTS, received a Doctor of Hebrew Letters. In 1943, he finished his PhD, "The Dilemma of Religion in Public Education". In August 1947, he went to Israel with Rhoda and lived in Jerusalem among Jews and Arabs. In April 1948, the young couple returned to the US, and Cohen returned to his job as the head of the Jewish Reconstructionist Federation. In 1961, Cohen made aliyah to Israel with his family and lived there for the rest of his life. The couple had three children and nine grandchildren.

== Activity ==
Cohen's work in Jewish education began in 1943, when he accepted a position as the educational director of the Cleveland Jewish School, later the Park Synagogue, in Cleveland, Ohio. He served at the Cleveland Jewish School until 1945, when he returned to New York City to take on his new role as director of the Jewish Reconstructionist Foundation. He held this job until 1952 when was appointed as educational director of the Society for the Advancement of Judaism (SAJ), the first Reconstructionist congregation. In 1954, Jack Cohen was appointed as center's rabbi, serving in this role until 1961. In those years, he taught a few courses in JTS that dealt with Judaism, philosophy and education. Dr. Jack Cohen was a member of the Rabbinical Assembly's Executive Council and vice-chairman of its Placement Commission; he served as chairman of the United Synagogue's Commission on Jewish Education during 1960–1961 period. In 1961, while living in Israel, Cohen served as the director of "Beit Hillel" of the Hebrew University in Jerusalem. As part of his job, he worked to create a bridge between Arab and Jewish students, initiating many projects. Jack Cohen taught at Reconstructionist Rabbinical College and was awarded the Keter Shem Tov and a Doctor of Divinity degree by RRC in 2000. He retired in 1984.

Cohen founded the Kehillat Mevakshei Derech congregation in Jerusalem. It aimed to be a place for Jewish life and culture, based on the Reconstructionist ideals. Furthermore, Cohen initiated Merkaz Kaplan together with the Kehillat Mevakshei Derech congregation. "Merkaz Kaplan" is working to pass on Mordecai Kaplan's legacy and Reconstructionist Judaism.

== Books ==
- Zionism Explained (1940)
- The Case for Religious Naturalism: A Philosophy for the Modern Jew (1958)
- The Creative Audience (1954, second edition 1962)
- Jewish Education in Democratic Society (1964)
- Jewish law and ritual (1967)
- Israel, Zionism and the American Jew (1967)
- The Reunion of Isaac and Ishmael (1987)
- Guides for an Age of Confusion: Studies in the Thinking of Avraham Y. Kook and Mordecai M. Kaplan (1999)
- Major Philosophers of Jewish Prayer in the Twentieth Century (2000)
- Democratizing Judaism (2010)
- Judaism in a Post-Halakhic Age (2010)
