= Temple Sinai (Roslyn, New York) =

- Hebrew: סִינַי

- Location on Long Island, New York

Religion
- Affiliation: Reform Judaism
- Ecclesiastical or organisational status: Synagogue
- Leadership: Rabbis Ilana Schachter and Michael A. White
- Status: Active

Location
- Location: 425 Roslyn Road, Roslyn Heights, NY 11577
- Country: United States
- Administration: Union for Reform Judaism
- Coordinates: 40°46′42″N 73°38′12″W

Architecture
- Architect: John W. Ebstein
- Type: Synagogue
- Established: 1947 (as a congregation)
- Completed: 1950

Website
- mysinai.org

Temple Sinai (also known as Temple Sinai of Roslyn and historically as the Roslyn Jewish Community Center) is the largest Reform synagogue on Long Island, located at 425 Roslyn Road in Roslyn Heights, on Long Island, New York, United States, in the Greater Roslyn area.

== Overview ==
The congregation was originally established in 1947, making it both the first and the oldest Jewish congregation established in the Greater Roslyn area (which is anchored by the Incorporated Village of Roslyn). It is affiliated with the Union for Reform Judaism, and as of 2026 was the largest Reform synagogue on Long Island.

As of 2026, the congregation's rabbis are Ilana Schachter and Michael A. White.

== History ==
Temple Sinai in 1950

What is today Temple Sinai was originally founded as the Roslyn area's first Jewish congregation in 1947, when Roslyn started to grow into one of Long Island's major Jewish communities. At the time, local Jewish residents – aiming to establish a new, local house of worship and religious center – established the Roslyn Jewish Community Center as a nondenominational congregation.

When originally founded, the Roslyn Jewish Community Center operated out of various leased spaces throughout the Greater Roslyn area – including the Roslyn Presbyterian Church on East Broadway in the Village of Roslyn. It purchased its present, 7.5-acre (3.0 ha) property at 425 Roslyn Road in 1948, in the southern part of present-day Roslyn Heights (the land had been located within the Village of Old Westbury until 1949). The synagogue building was dedicated on August 27, 1950, and was designed by John W. Ebstein. It would be significantly expanded through multiple projects between 1952 and 1962.

Also occurring in 1950 was a significant decision by the Roslyn Jewish Community Center, with the majority of its members deciding at that time to affiliate with Reform Judaism. This decision caused a fracture, with several members – including approximately 30 families – who were more aligned with Conservative Judaism feeling alienated. These congregants, in turn, broke away from the Reform-affiliated Roslyn Jewish Community Center and founded Temple Beth Sholom that June; that synagogue then held its first services that August.

In 1952, the Roslyn Jewish Community Center changed its name to Temple Sinai. This new name was chosen in part due to its simplicity, with congregants having frequently started referring to it by then as "the Temple." It was regularly known as Temple Sinai by 1960.

In 1976, membership at Temple Sinai reached reached 1,225 families – its 20th-century peak.

In 1985, the synagogue underwent extensive renovations and was rededicated.

== Notable congregants ==
- Helene Fortunoff – Businesswoman.
- Howard Stern – Radio personality.

== See also ==
- Reform Judaism
- List of synagogues in the United States
- Reconstructionist Synagogue of the North Shore
- North Country Reform Temple
