= Judith Kaplan Eisenstein =

American author, musicologist and theologian

- Born: September 10, 1909; New York City, New York, U.S.
- Died: February 14, 1996 (aged 86); Bethesda, Maryland, U.S.
- Education: Columbia University, Juilliard School, Jewish Institute of Religion, Jewish Theological Seminary Teachers Institute
- Known for: Author, musicologist and composer, first to publicly celebrate a Bat Mitzvah
- Spouses: Albert Addelston (m. 1932-3); Ira Eisenstein (married 1934)
- Children: 3

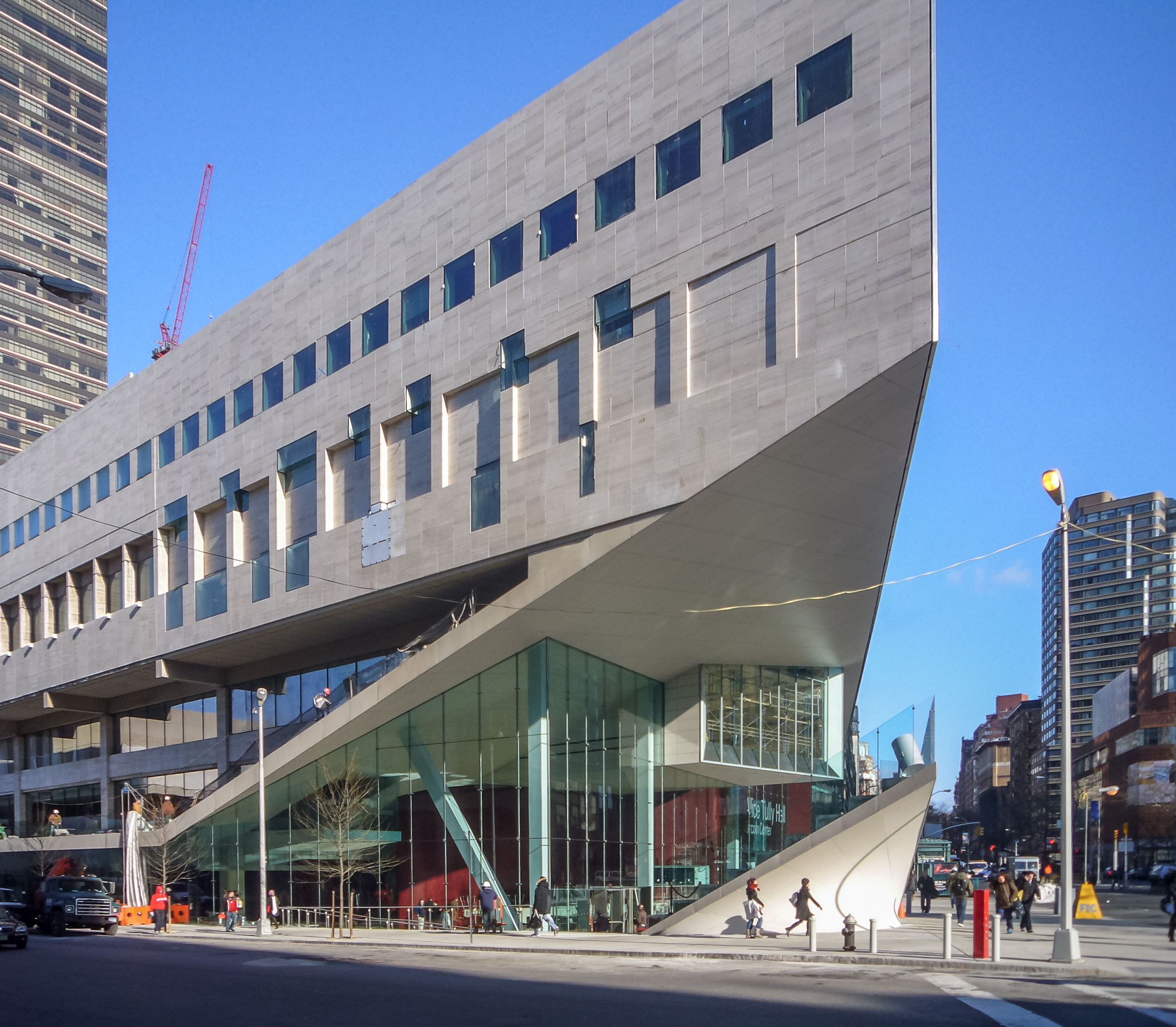
Juilliard School, New York

Judith Eisenstein (née Kaplan; September 10, 1909 – February 14, 1996) was an American author, musicologist, composer, theologian. She was the eldest daughter of Mordecai Kaplan, the founder of Reconstructionist Judaism, and the first Jewish woman to publicly celebrate a bat mitzvah in the United States in 1922.

== Life ==
The bat mitzvah was created to address Judaism's gender imbalance and is the female equivalent of a boy's bar mitzvah, signifying entrance into religious majority. Judith, the eldest of four daughters born to Lena (née Rubin) and Rabbi Mordecai Kaplan (who was the founder of the Reconstructionist branch of Judaism), was the first person to celebrate a bat mitzvah publicly in America, which she did on March 18, 1922, aged 12, at her father’s synagogue, the Society for the Advancement of Judaism in New York City.

Kaplan recited the preliminary blessing, read a portion of that week's Torah portion in Hebrew and English, and then intoned the closing blessing. Her bat mitzvah was the first time that a woman led the congregation; as such it represents a significant shift for Judaism in America. Until this time women did not engage in public reading of the Torah and a Jewish girl's transition from child to adult was not reflected in synagogue ceremonies.

Reflecting on the ceremony many years later she said: "No thunder sounded. No lightning struck." "It all passed very peacefully." Bat mitzvah ceremonies are now commonplace within the Conservative, Reform, and Reconstructionist branches of Judaism. At the age of 82, Kaplan had a second bat mitzvah. Various feminist and Jewish leaders, including Betty Friedan, Letty Cottin Pogrebin, Ruth W. Messinger, and Elizabeth Holtzman were present.

During her life she was an author, theologian, musicologist and composer. She earned bachelor's and master's degrees from Columbia University and studied at the Institute of Musical Art, now the Juilliard School. She published a book of children's music, Gateway to Jewish Song, and a number of cantatas on Jewish themes, including the popular "What Is Torah," with her husband, Rabbi Ira Eisenstein whom she married in 1934. Her translations of Hebrew songs are now enjoyed by Jewish children throughout the US. She taught music education and the history of Jewish music at the Albert A. List College of Jewish Studies from 1929 to 1954. She taught at School of Sacred Music of Hebrew Union College-Jewish Institute of Religion in New York from 1966 to 1979.

Eisenstein was a longtime member of the Reconstructionist Synagogue of the North Shore in Plandome (and previously Roslyn Estates), on Long Island, New York; her husband served as the congregation's rabbi.

== Death ==
Judith Kaplan Eisenstein died on February 14, 1996, aged 86, in Silver Spring, Maryland. Her papers are included in the Ira and Judith Kaplan Eisenstein Reconstructionist Archives of the Reconstructionist Rabbinical College.

== Selected works ==
- Eisenstein, Judith Kaplan (1939). The Gateway to Jewish Song. Behrman House.
- Eisenstein, Judith Kaplan. "Festival Songs Shirey Mo'ed by Eisenstein, Judith Kaplan: Bloch Publishing Co., New York stapled paper Covers – Meir Turner". www.abebooks.com.
- Eisenstein, Judith Kaplan; Prensky, Frieda (June 1, 1981). Songs of Childhood. United Synagogue of America Book Service. ISBN 9780838107225.
- Eisenstein, Judith Kaplan. "Heritage of music: the music of the Jewish people by Judith Kaplan Eisenstein on Seforim House". Seforim House.
- Eisenstein, Judith Kaplan; Eisenstein, Ira (1952). Reborn: an episode with music. Jewish Reconstructionist Foundation. OCLC 5257031.
- Eisenstein, Judith Kaplan (1972). The sacrifice of Isaac; a liturgical drama. Reconstructionist Press. OCLC 832818.
- Eisenstein, Judith K. and Ira (January 1, 1947). The Seven golden buttons: a legend with music. Jewish Reconstructionist Foundation.
- Shir ha-shahar [Song of the Dawn] (1974)
