= Denton House (New Hyde Park, New York) =

Historic building in New Hyde Park, New York

Coordinates: 40°44′12″N 73°40′24″W

Denton House (McDonald's Restaurant #12000)
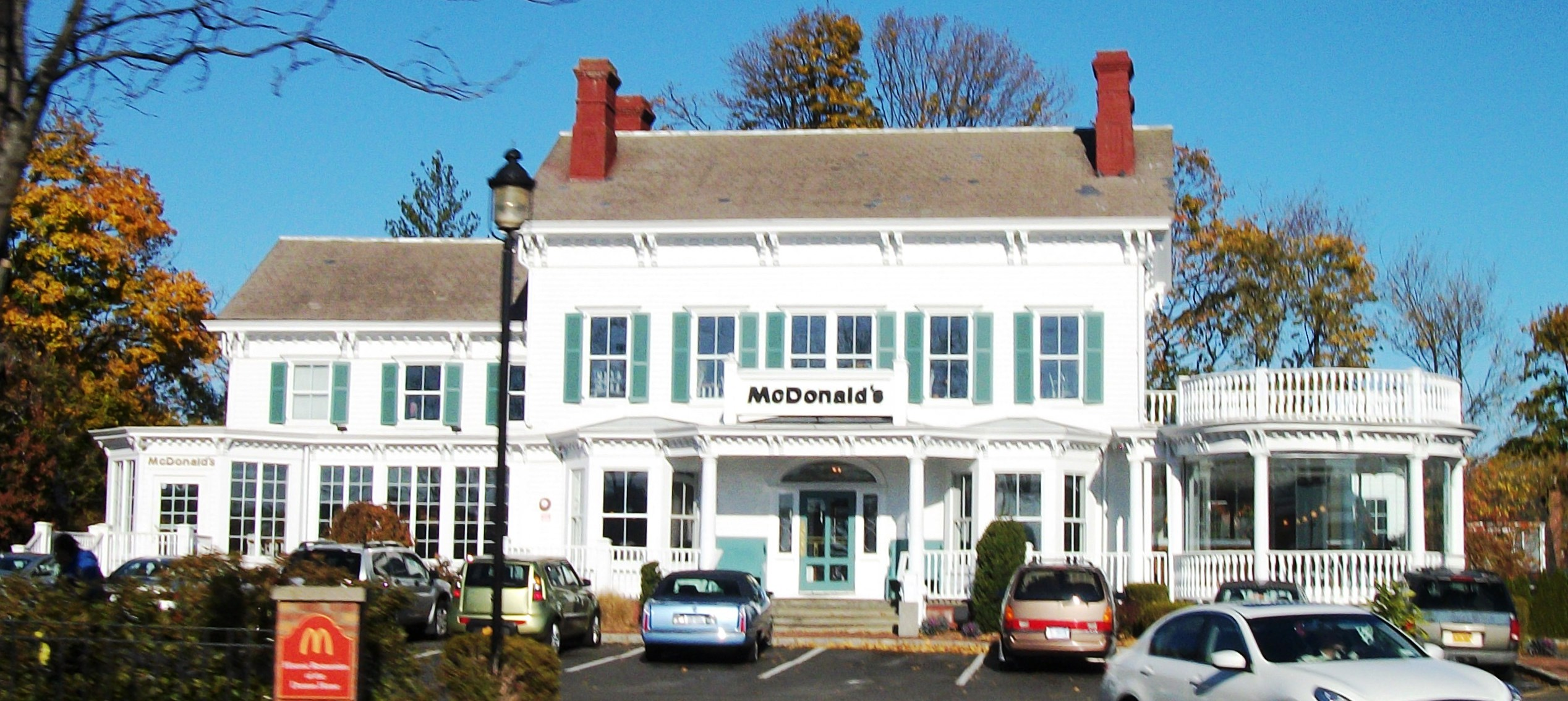
- View from New York State Route 25, 2013
- Interactive map of the Denton House (McDonald's Restaurant #12000) area

General information
- Location: 2045 Jericho Turnpike, New Hyde Park, New York, United States
- Current tenants: McDonald's (operated as a franchise by Joan and Lawrence Anderer Jr., as of 1991)
- Completed: 1795
- Owner: McDonald's

Height
- Architectural: Georgian

Technical details
- Floor count: 2

Other information
- Seating capacity: 140

The Denton House is a historic building in North New Hyde Park, New York, within the Town of North Hempstead. Built in 1795 as a farmhouse, it was converted in the 1860s to a Georgian-style mansion. It is currently a McDonald's restaurant.

== History ==
The building was built as a farmhouse for the family of Joseph Denton in 1795. The owners were descendants of Richard Denton, a Presbyterian minister who immigrated in 1630 and a founder of the town, and his son, colonist Daniel Denton. In the 1860s, it was converted into a Georgian-style mansion, with ornamentation.

The house ceased being a private residence after World War I, at which point it became a funeral home and then a series of restaurants.

McDonald's acquired the dilapidated property in 1985, intending to demolish it and build a standard structure. North Hempstead and residents of the New Hyde Park community successfully sought historic designation after a three-year battle, which was formally given on January 5, 1988. An agreement was reached with McDonald's to allow a single-story addition to the back for a drive-thru if the front exterior was restored to its 1926 appearance. After an extensive renovation which included installing a series of windows for the veranda, and restoration of the ornamentation, window shutters, and brick chimneys, McDonald's opened in the historic building on April 13, 1991. A plaque commemorating the opening can be found inside the dining room. The inside was gutted in the process, including exposed rafters. A grand staircase leads to a dining area on the second floor.

As part of McDonald's company-wide renovation program, the Denton House received another renovation in 2017. Intended to conform with McDonald's design standards while still maintaining a historic look, the renovation refinished the interior woodwork and flooring, updated the restrooms, and added amenities consistent with McDonald's remodels, including digital menu boards, touchscreen ordering kiosks, and table service. The window shutters and front doors were also restored and repainted black.

== Gallery ==
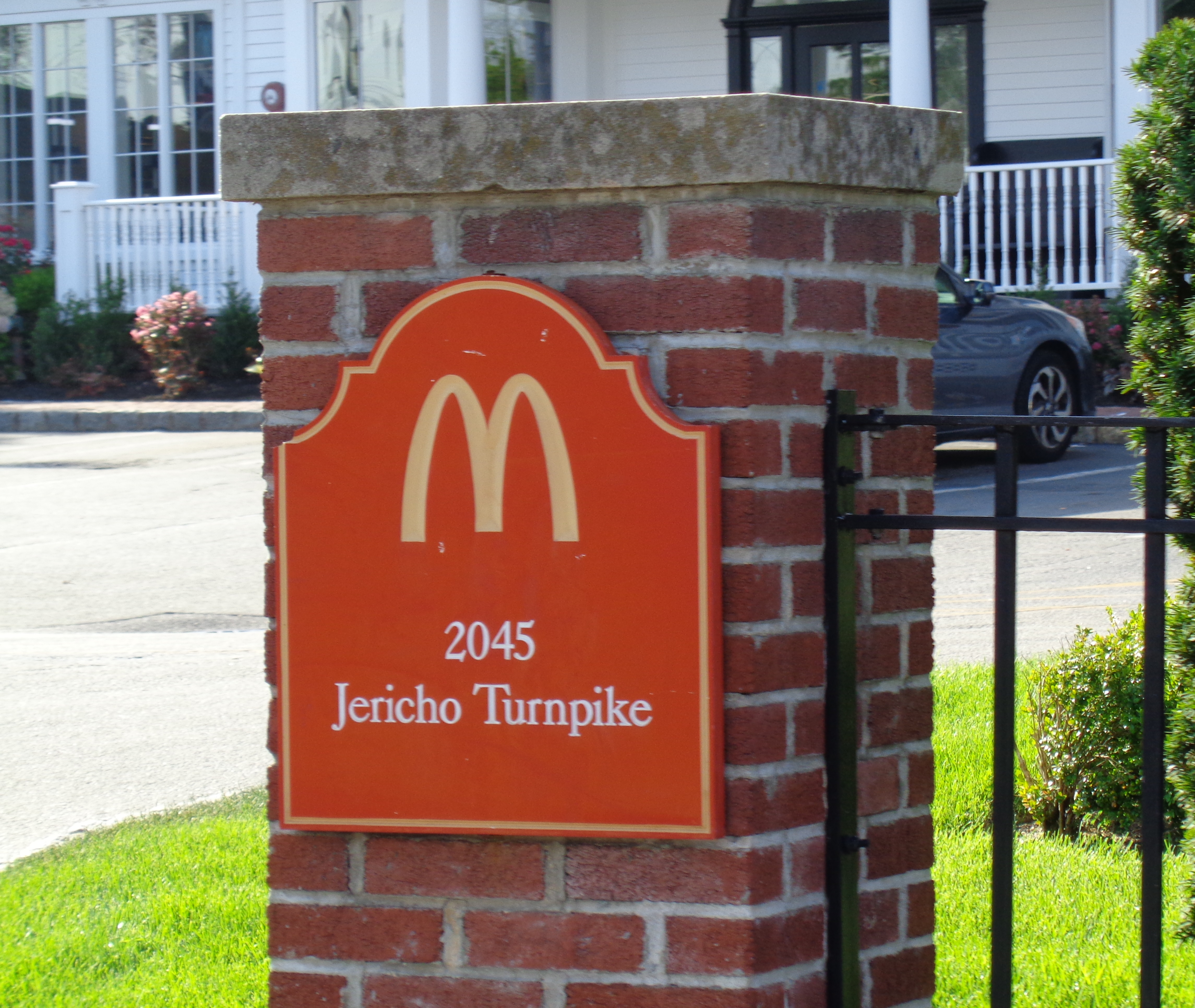

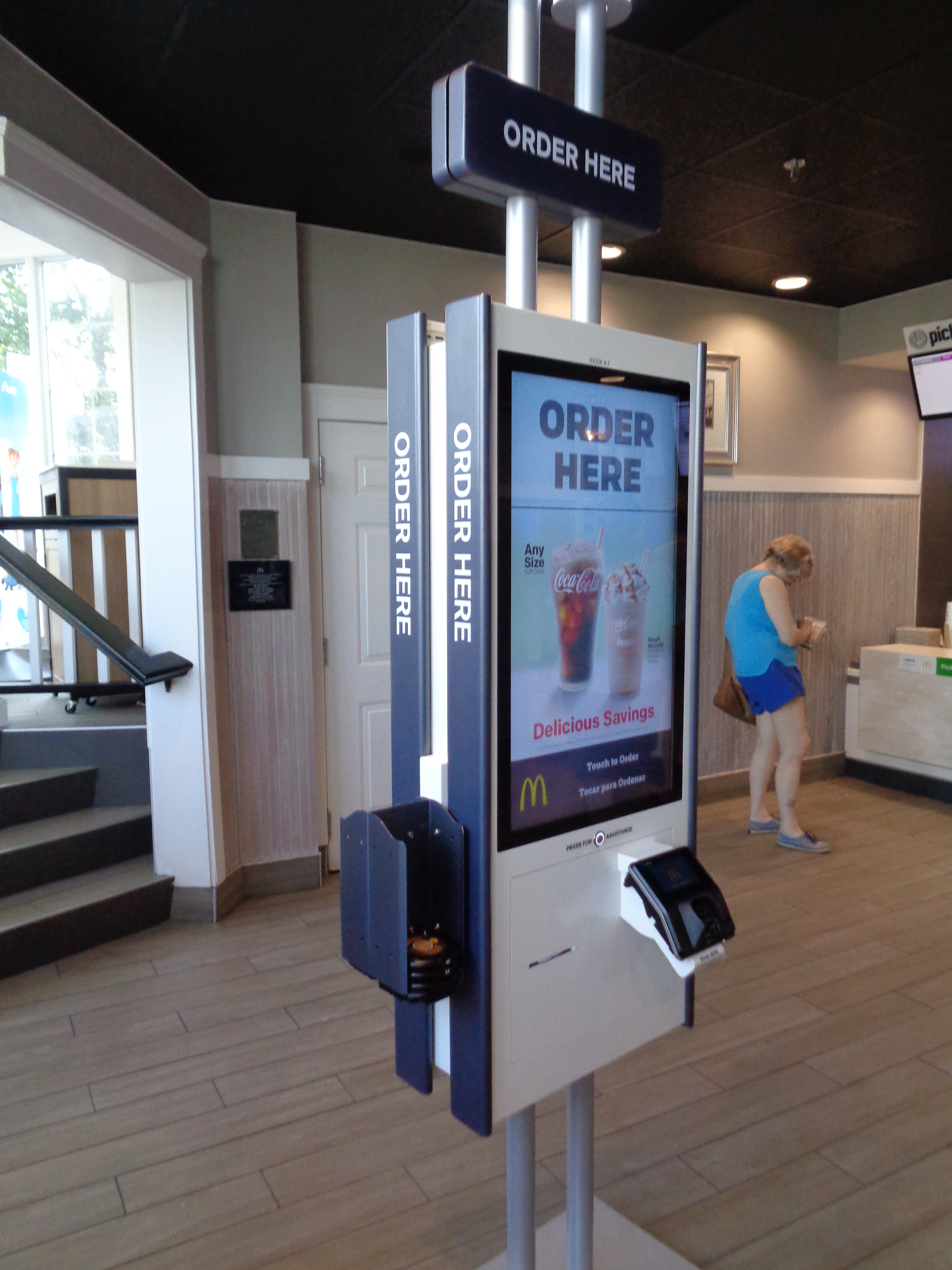

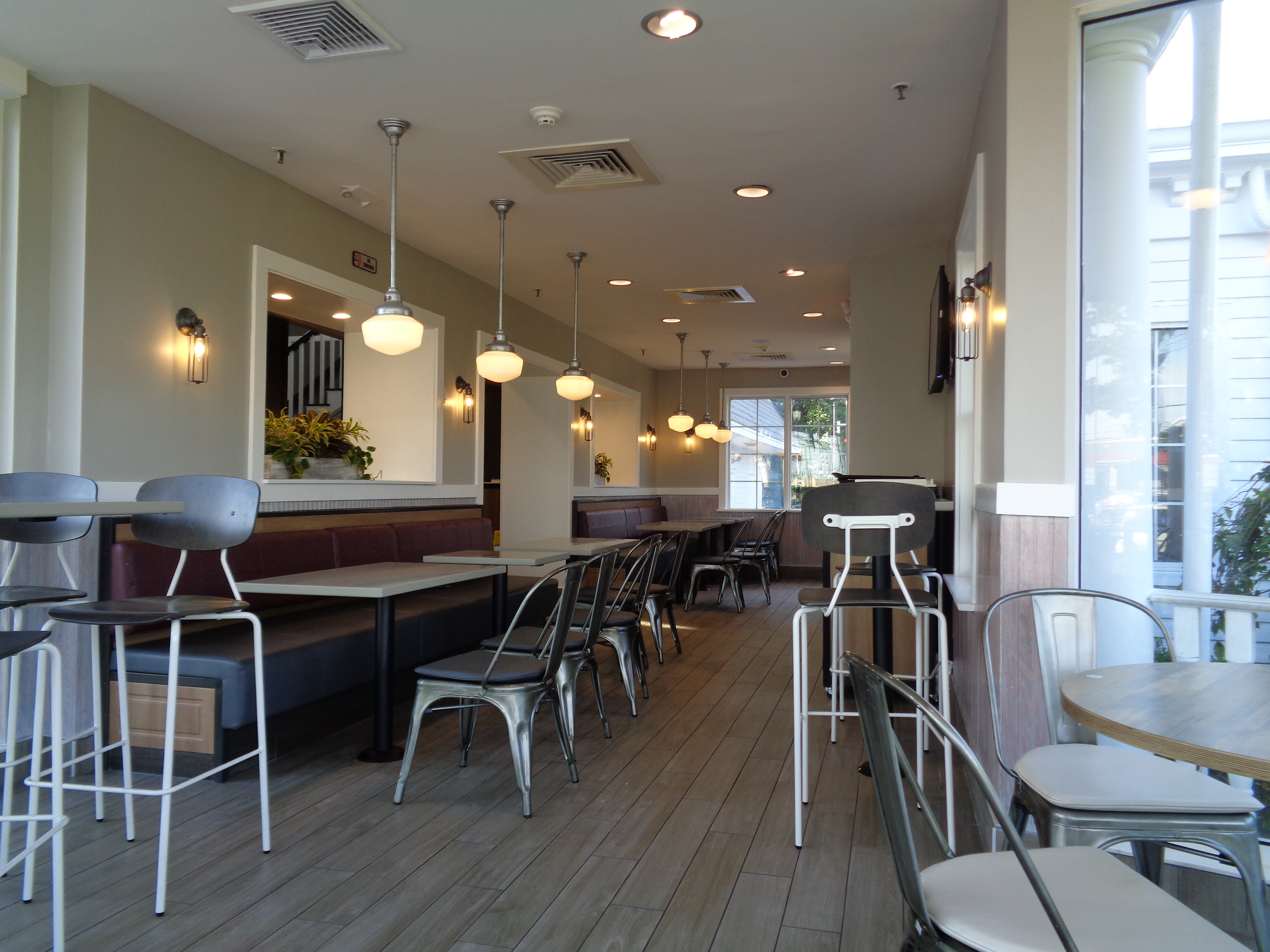

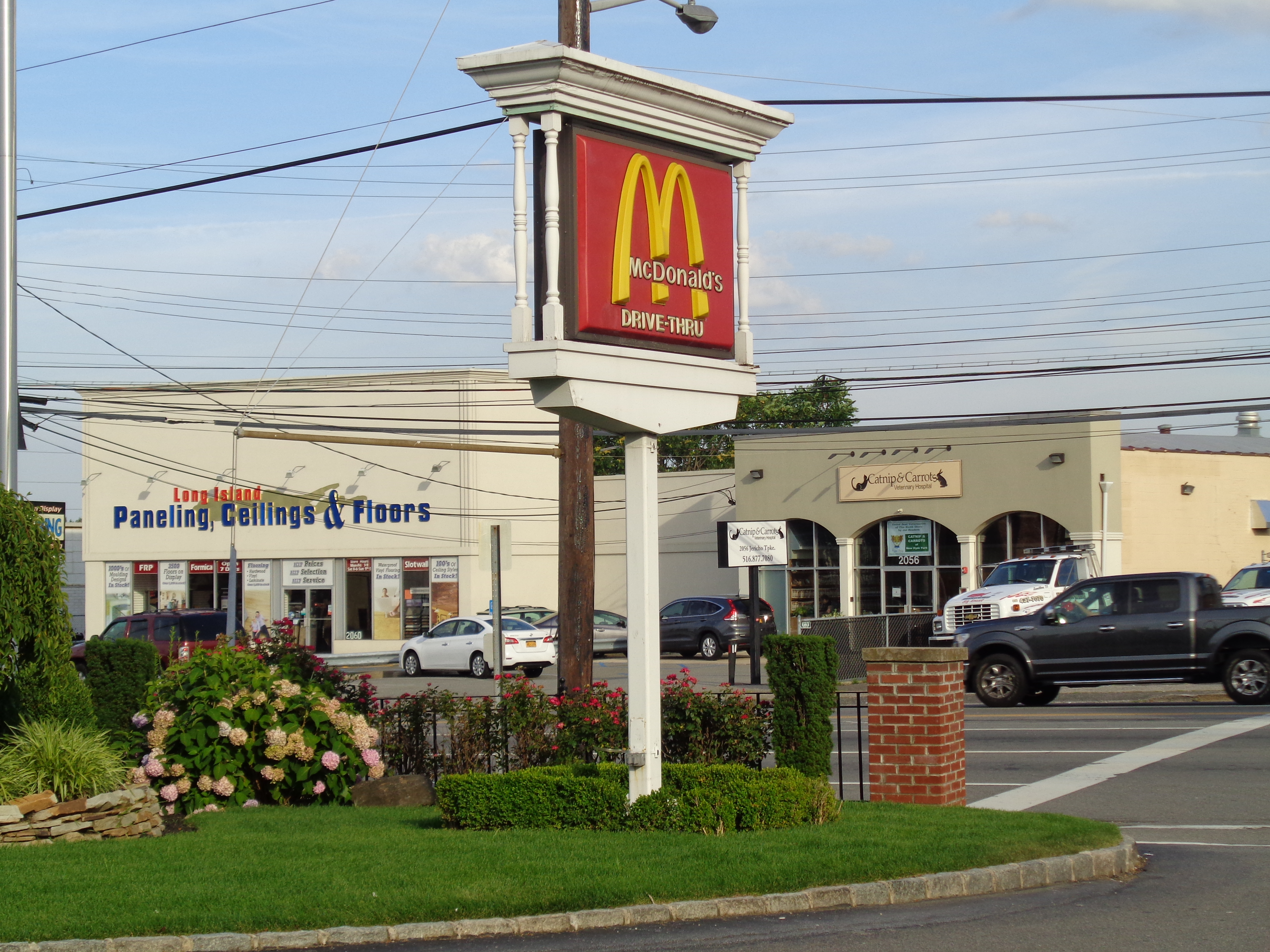

== See also ==
- List of Town of North Hempstead Designated Landmarks
