= Harry Fishbein =

American bridge player and club owner

Harry J. Fishbein
- Born: April 18, 1897; Manhattan, New York City
- Died: February 19, 1976 (aged 78); Manhattan, New York City
- Known for: bridge player and club owner

Harry J. Fishbein (April 18, 1897 – February 19, 1976) was an American bridge player and club owner. He used to be a professional basketball player. In teams-of-four competition, Fishbein was a runner-up for the world championship in the 1959 Bermuda Bowl, playing on the United States team in a three-way round-robin among Europe, North America, and South America representatives. Fishbein was "the presiding genius" of the famous Mayfair club [or Mayfair Bridge Club] for more than 20 years" – proprietor of the training ground of experts from 1943 to 1966. As of 1960 he was also ACBL Treasurer.

He developed the Fishbein convention as a defense against preemptive opening bids.

== Biography ==
He was born on April 18, 1898, in Manhattan, New York City. He died on February 19, 1976, at the New York Infirmary following a heart attack.

== Legacy ==
Fishbein was inducted into the ACBL Hall of Fame in 2000.

He was a second cousin of the noted Orthodox Jewish scholar J.D. Eisenstein.

== Publications ==
- —— (1960). The Fishbein Convention. New York: Crown Publishers. LCCN 60008621.

== Bridge accomplishments ==
=== Honors ===
- ACBL Hall of Fame, 2000

=== Wins ===
- North American Bridge Championships (16)
  - Master Individual (2) 1942, 1952
  - von Zedtwitz Life Master Pairs (2) 1939, 1940
  - Wernher Open Pairs (1) 1959
  - Hilliard Mixed Pairs (3) 1937, 1942, 1946
  - Vanderbilt (5) 1936, 1943, 1947, 1949, 1958
  - Marcus Cup (1) 1967
  - Mitchell Board-a-Match Teams (1) 1965
  - Chicago Mixed Board-a-Match (1) 1947

=== Runners-up ===
- Bermuda Bowl (1) 1959
- North American Bridge Championships
  - Master Individual (1) 1938
  - Silodor Open Pairs (2) 1959, 1968
  - Wernher Open Pairs (1) 1940
  - Nail Life Master Open Pairs (1) 1963
  - Open Pairs (1928-1962) (5) 1934, 1937, 1940, 1941, 1942
  - Masters Team of 4 (1) 1937
  - Mitchell Board-a-Match Teams (3) 1952, 1953, 1960
  - Chicago Mixed Board-a-Match (2) 1945, 1948
  - Reisinger (4) 1942, 1953, 1957, 1959
  - Spingold (3) 1943, 1945, 1958
