= The Reconstructionist Journal =

Jewish magazine

- Former editors: Mordecai Kaplan
- Categories: Jewish magazine
- Publisher: Reconstructionist Rabbinical Association
- Founder: Mordecai Kaplan, Milton Steinberg, Eugene Kohn, Ira Eisenstein
- First issue: 1935
- Final issue: 2007
- Country: United States
- Website: therra.org/recon-journal.php

The Reconstructionist Journal was a Jewish magazine published by the Reconstructionist Rabbinical Association.

== History ==
In 1935, the favorable reception to Rabbi Mordecai Kaplan's book Judaism as a Civilization inspired Kaplan to launch a magazine, The Reconstructionist, for the Reconstructionist movement. The magazine was established by Mordecai Kaplan, Milton Steinberg, Eugene Kohn, and Ira Eisenstein. It was renamed The Reconstructionist Journal in 1996 and ceased publication in 2007.
