= North New Hyde Park, New York =

- Hamlet and census-designated place
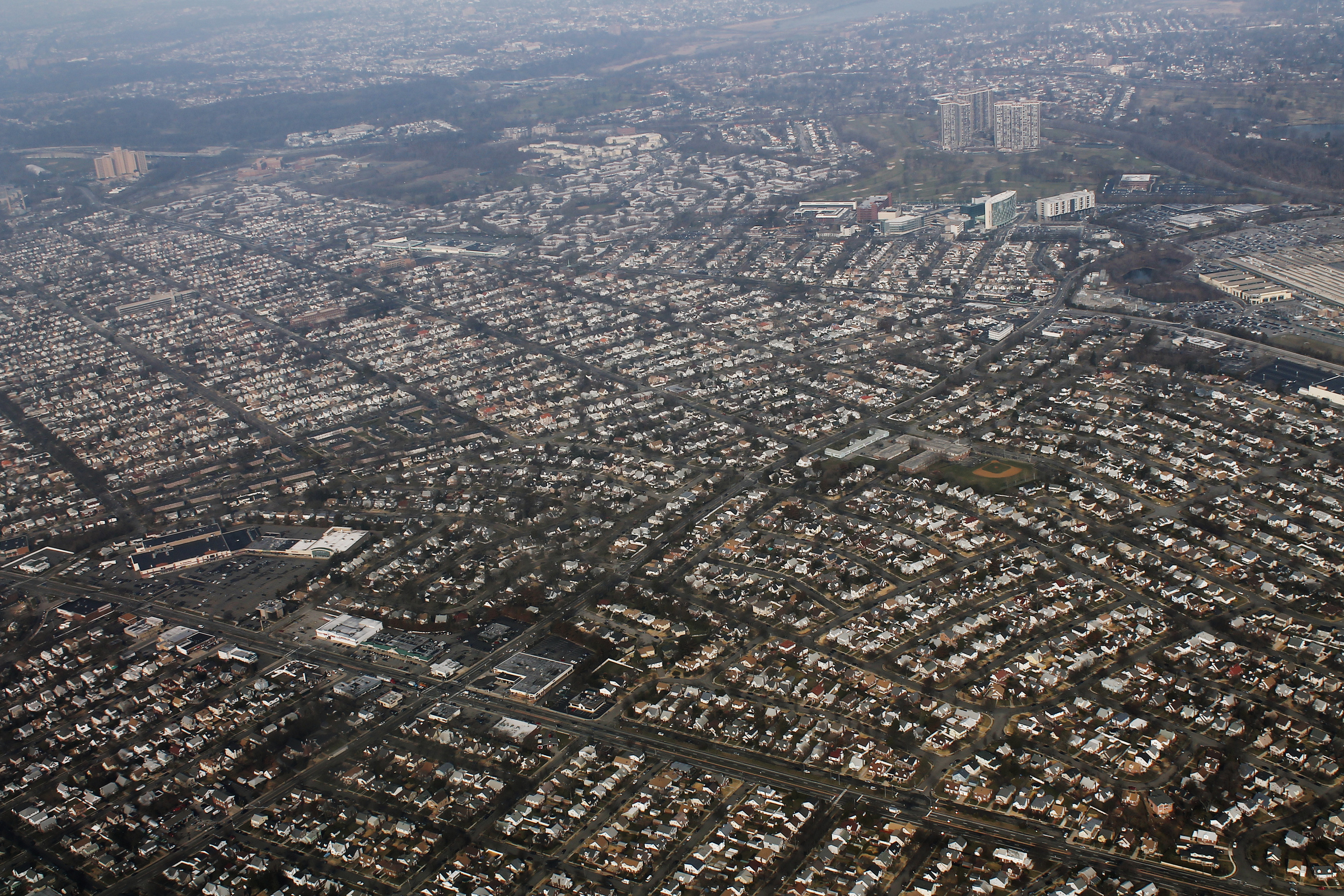
- North New Hyde Park and its vicinity, viewed from the air

- Location in Nassau County and the state of New York

- Location on Long Island Location within the state of New York
- Coordinates: 40°44′44″N 73°41′17″W
- Country: United States
- State: New York
- County: Nassau
- Town: North Hempstead
- Named after: Its location north of New Hyde Park

Area
  - Total: 2.01 sq mi (5.21 km^{2})
  - Land: 1.99 sq mi (5.16 km^{2})
  - Water: 0.023 sq mi (0.06 km^{2})
- Elevation: 115 ft (35 m)

Population (2020)
  - Total: 15,657
  - Density: 7,863.2/sq mi (3,036.01/km^{2})
- Time zone: UTC-5 (Eastern (EST))
  - Summer (DST): UTC-4 (EDT)
- ZIP Codes: 11040, 11042 (North New Hyde Park); 11001 (Floral Park)
- Area codes: 516, 363
- FIPS code: 36-53275
- GNIS feature ID: 0958861

North New Hyde Park is a hamlet and census-designated place (CDP) located within the southwestern portion of the Town of North Hempstead in Nassau County, on Long Island, in New York, United States. The population was 15,657 at the time of the 2020 census.

In addition to the hamlet of North New Hyde Park, the North New Hyde Park CDP also includes the hamlets of Floral Park Centre and Lakeville Estates.

== History ==
The hamlet's name reflects the fact that it is located immediately north of New Hyde Park.

The Lake Success Shopping Center, located on Union Turnpike within the hamlet, opened in 1956; it was designed by Abraham H. Salkowitz.

== Geography ==
According to the United States Census Bureau, North New Hyde Park has a total area of 2.0 square miles (5.2 km^{2}), all land.

As aforementioned, the areas known as Floral Park Centre and Lakeville Estates are located within the boundaries of the North New Hyde Park CDP.

=== Climate ===
According to the Köppen climate classification, North New Hyde Park has a Humid subtropical climate (type Cfa) with cool, wet winters and hot, humid summers. Precipitation is uniform throughout the year, with slight spring and fall peaks.

Climate data for North New Hyde Park, New York, 1991–2020 normals, extremes 1999–present
Month	Jan	Feb	Mar	Apr	May	Jun	Jul	Aug	Sep	Oct	Nov	Dec	Year
Record high °F (°C)	71 (22)	73 (23)	85 (29)	94 (34)	97 (36)	103 (39)	105 (41)	104 (40)	100 (38)	90 (32)	83 (28)	76 (24)	105 (41)
Mean daily maximum °F (°C)	39 (4)	43 (6)	50 (10)	61 (16)	70 (21)	80 (27)	85 (29)	83 (28)	76 (24)	65 (18)	55 (13)	45 (7)	63 (17)
Mean daily minimum °F (°C)	26 (−3)	28 (−2)	34 (1)	42 (6)	51 (11)	61 (16)	66 (19)	65 (18)	58 (14)	48 (9)	40 (4)	31 (−1)	46 (8)
Record low °F (°C)	−10 (−23)	−7 (−22)	3 (−16)	13 (−11)	32 (0)	43 (6)	50 (10)	48 (9)	38 (3)	27 (−3)	10 (−12)	−1 (−18)	−10 (−23)
Average precipitation inches (mm)	3.62 (92)	3.17 (81)	4.35 (110)	4.15 (105)	3.90 (99)	3.85 (98)	4.40 (112)	3.72 (94)	3.91 (99)	4.08 (104)	3.73 (95)	3.82 (97)	46.7 (1,186)
Source: The Weather Channel

==== Plant zone ====
According to the United States Department of Agriculture (USDA), North New Hyde Park is located within hardiness zone 7b.

== Demographics ==
Historical population
Census	Pop.	Note	%±
2000	14,542		—
2010	14,889		2.4%
2020	15,657		5.2%
U.S. Decennial Census

=== Racial and ethnic composition ===
North New Hyde Park CDP, New York – Racial and ethnic composition Note: the US Census treats Hispanic/Latino as an ethnic category. This table excludes Latinos from the racial categories and assigns them to a separate category. Hispanics/Latinos may be of any race.
Race / Ethnicity (NH = Non-Hispanic)	Pop 2000	Pop 2010	Pop 2020	% 2000	% 2010	% 2020
White alone (NH)	11,475	9,059	6,588	78.91%	60.80%	42.08%
Black or African American alone (NH)	43	90	108	0.30%	0.60%	0.69%
Native American or Alaska Native alone (NH)	20	28	37	0.14%	0.19%	0.24%
Asian alone (NH)	2,152	4,329	7,238	14.80%	29.06%	46.23%
Native Hawaiian or Pacific Islander alone (NH)	3	0	8	0.02%	0.00%	0.05%
Other race alone (NH)	27	45	159	0.19%	0.30%	1.02%
Mixed race or Multiracial (NH)	115	270	289	0.79%	1.81%	1.85%
Hispanic or Latino (any race)	707	1,078	1,230	4.86%	7.24%	7.86%
Total	14,542	14,899	15,657	100.00%	100.00%	100.00%

=== 2020 census ===
As of the 2020 census, North New Hyde Park had a population of 15,657. The median age was 45.0 years. 19.8% of residents were under the age of 18 and 20.9% of residents were 65 years of age or older. For every 100 females there were 95.2 males, and for every 100 females age 18 and over there were 93.1 males age 18 and over.

100.0% of residents lived in urban areas, while 0.0% lived in rural areas.

There were 4,887 households in North New Hyde Park, of which 35.1% had children under the age of 18 living in them. Of all households, 69.7% were married-couple households, 9.5% were households with a male householder and no spouse or partner present, and 18.9% were households with a female householder and no spouse or partner present. About 14.8% of all households were made up of individuals and 10.4% had someone living alone who was 65 years of age or older.

There were 5,024 housing units, of which 2.7% were vacant. The homeowner vacancy rate was 0.9% and the rental vacancy rate was 2.5%.

=== 2010 census ===
As of the census of 2010, there were 14,889 people residing in the CDP. The racial makeup of the CDP was 65.67% White, 0.72% African American, 0.26% Native American, 29.14% Asian, 0% Pacific Islander, 2.04% from other races, and 2.16% from two or more races. Hispanic or Latino of any race were 7.24% of the population.

=== 2000 census ===
As of the census of 2000, there were 14,542 people, 5,032 households, and 4,055 families residing in the CDP. The population density was 7,350.1 inhabitants per square mile (2,837.9/km^{2}). There were 5,116 housing units at an average density of 2,585.8 per square mile (998.4/km^{2}). The racial makeup of the CDP was 82.38% White, 0.33% African American, 0.14% Native American, 14.83% Asian, 0.02% Pacific Islander, 1.22% from other races, and 1.07% from two or more races. Hispanic or Latino of any race were 4.86% of the population.

There were 5,032 households, out of which 32.5% had children under the age of 18 living with them, 68.9% were married couples living together, 9.0% had a female householder with no husband present, and 19.4% were non-families. 17.9% of all households were made up of individuals, and 12.0% had someone living alone who was 65 years of age or older. The average household size was 2.89 and the average family size was 3.28.

In the CDP, the population was spread out, with 22.0% under the age of 18, 6.5% from 18 to 24, 25.4% from 25 to 44, 26.5% from 45 to 64, and 19.7% who were 65 years of age or older. The median age was 43 years. For every 100 females, there were 89.9 males. For every 100 females age 18 and over, there were 87.4 males.

The median income for a household in the CDP was $69,792, and the median income for a family was $80,688. Males had a median income of $53,667 versus $42,162 for females. The per capita income for the CDP was $31,998. About 1.8% of families and 2.7% of the population were below the poverty line, including 3.1% of those under age 18 and 4.0% of those age 65 or over.

== Education ==
North New Hyde Park is divided among the following school districts:

- New Hyde Park-Garden City Park Union Free School District (K–6) and Sewanhaka Central High School District (7–12)
- Herricks Union Free School District
- Great Neck Union Free School District

== Landmarks ==
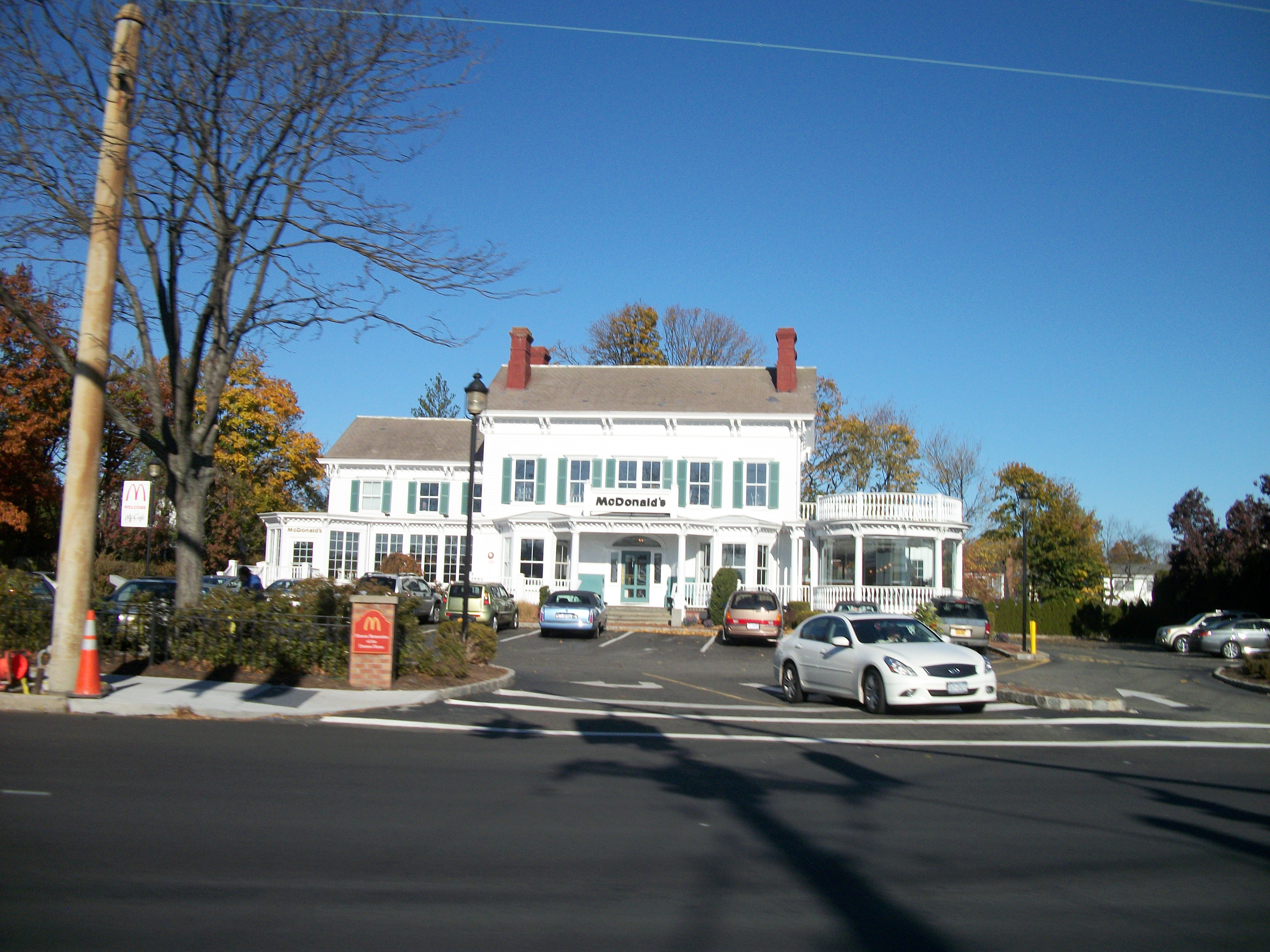
The Joseph Denton Mansion – now a McDonald's restaurant

The Denton House – located on Jericho Turnpike, within North New Hyde Park – was designated as a historic site after citizens fought for its historic designation. It is now a McDonald's restaurant also known as the "McDonald's Mansion". The fast-food chain kept the design of the exterior of the house and built a drive-through in the back.

The Denton House is designated as a Town of North Hempstead Designated Landmark.

== Notable people ==
- Michael J. Tully, Jr. – Former New York State Senator and Supervisor of the Town of North Hempstead; lived on Patton Boulevard.

== See also ==
- List of Census-designated places in New York
- New Hyde Park (Village), New York
- Garden City Park, New York
- Manhasset Hills, New York
