= Abraham Salkowitz =

American architect (1908–1998)

Abraham Harold Salkowitz
- Born: November 17, 1908; The Bronx, New York
- Died: January 7, 1998 (aged 89); New York
- Occupation: Architect
- Years active: 20th century
- Notable work: Lake Success Shopping Center; North Shore Towers
- Spouse: Fae
- Children: 4

Abraham H. Salkowitz (known professionally as A.H. Salkowitz; November 17, 1908 – January 7, 1998) was an American architect, best known for his work throughout the New York metropolitan area – specifically in Queens in New York City, and in Nassau and Suffolk Counties on Long Island. He is credited as being one of the key architectural figures in the suburbanization of Long Island.

== Biography and career ==
Abraham Harold Salkowitz was born in the Bronx, New York, on November 17, 1908. He attended the Hebrew Technical Institute and the New York Building School, as well as City College of New York. Salkowitz also studied architecture at New York University, but he dropped out of the school before finishing his degree. He soon thereafter began working for a Queens architect, Joseph Unger, before opening his practice in 1936.

Salkowitz primarily worked on residential architectural projects in Queens up until about 1950. It was about this time when he began also designing commercial buildings, shopping centers, and synagogues – and expanding into Nassau and Suffolk Counties.

In the early 1950s, Salkowitz designed the houses for the 150-home Westwood at Roslyn development in East Hills, New York, located on land previously occupied by the Schumaker Farm; he would eventually move into one of those homes: 151 Westwood Circle. In 1952, he designed 515 homes for the 120-acre (49 ha) Southwood-at-Syosset housing development, off South Oyster Bay Road in Syosset, New York.

In 1953, Salkowitz designed the 20-acre (8.1 ha) Lake Success Shopping Center in North New Hyde Park, New York; it was completed in 1956.

In the mid-1950s Salkowitz designed the houses in the Cherrywood Homes development in Manhasset Hills, New York. This development was built on a 24-acre (9.7 ha) tract by Barney and Martin Spiegel, consisting of 88 split-level houses, and was constructed on one of the last remaining major, undeveloped tracts of land available in Manhasset Hills.

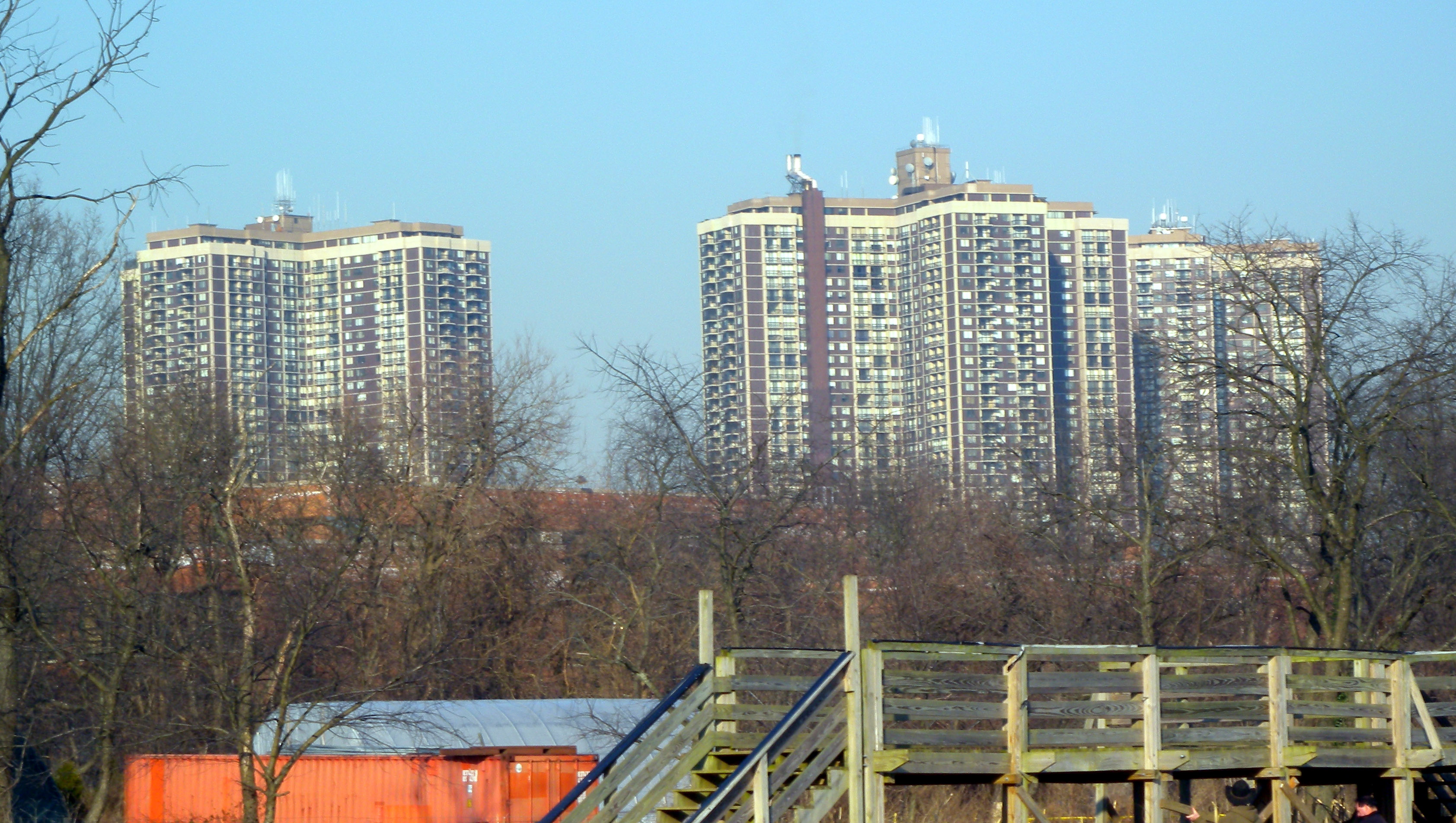
The North Shore Towers in 2010

Salkowitz, along with his partner, Carl Heimberger, designed the North Shore Towers in Glen Oaks, Queens, in 1971.

In 1988, Salkowitz closed his firm. Heimberger continued working as an architect, eventually founding Heimberger & Seidman.

=== Death ===
Salkowitz died on January 7, 1998, aged 89.

=== Personal life ===
Salkowitz was Jewish and was a member of Temple Beth Sholom – a Conservative synagogue – in East Hills, New York. He was married to his wife, Fae, who predeceased him. They had four children and several grandchildren. For many years, they lived at 151 Westwood Circle in East Hills – a home which he designed as part of the Westwood at Roslyn development.

== Notable works ==
- Lake Success Shopping Center – North New Hyde Park, New York (1953)
- North Shore Towers – Queens, New York (1971)

== See also ==
- Manoug Exerjian
- Frank Genese
- Henry Johanson
- Stanley H. Klein
