= Frank Genese =

American architect and politician

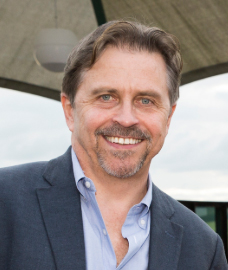

Deputy Mayor of Flower Hill, New York
- Incumbent
- Assumed office 2023
- Preceded by: Brian Herrington

Village Trustee of Flower Hill, New York
- Incumbent
- Assumed office 2016
- Preceded by: Robert McNamara

Personal details
- Education: Bronx High School of Science
- Alma mater: State University of New York at Buffalo
- Occupation: Architect; politician

Frank Genese is an American architect and politician. He is a principal owner of N2 Design+Architecture, PC, located in Baxter Estates, New York.

== Life and career ==
=== Early life and education ===
Frank Genese grew up in Flushing, Queens. He graduated from the Bronx High School of Science in 1976, and attended the State University of New York at Buffalo, where he earned a Bachelor of Professional Studies in Architecture and a Master of Architecture degree.

=== Career ===
Prior to joining N2, Genese had a successful career in the New York design and construction industry. He was a Vice President at D&B Engineers & Architects, PC; Vice President for Capital & Facilities Management at the Queens Library; Vice President and Architect of the Garden at The New York Botanical Garden; served as head of facilities and operations at the New York Institute of Technology (NYIT), the City University of New York. He has also held various positions with the government of New York City, including the Office of the Mayor, New York City Department of Design and Construction and the New York City Department of General Services.

Genese is licensed to practice architecture in New York, Connecticut, New Jersey and Florida.

He has served for 25 years on various boards of disabled organizations, including the Eastern Paralyzed Veterans Association/United Spinal Association and the North American Wheelchair Athletic Association.

==== Political career ====
Since 2016, Genese has served as a Village Trustee of the Village of Flower Hill, New York. After previously serving on Flower Hill's Planning Board and Architectural Review Committee, he was originally appointed as a Village Trustee in 2016, following Trustee Robert McNamara's appointment as Mayor when former Mayor Elaine Phillips was elected into the New York State Senate. He was ultimately re-elected as Trustee by residents.

In 2023, Genese was appointed as Deputy Mayor, succeeding Brian Herrington.

Genese is also Chairman of the Town of North Hempstead Historic Landmarks Preservation Commission, a member of the Port Washington Fire Department LOSAP Board, an executive member of the Science Museum of Long Island Board of Trustees, and a former member of the Hempstead Harbor Protection Committee.

== See also ==
- Manoug Exerjian – Another architect and government official who lived in Flower Hill.
- Henry Johanson – Another architect and Flower Hill government official.
- Abraham Salkowitz
