= Fishbein convention =

Bidding convention in contract bridge

The Fishbein convention is a bidding convention in contract bridge developed by Harry Fishbein used to compete against a preemptive opening bid by the opponents.

== The convention ==
A preemptive opening bid, a high-level bid on a weak hand, attempts to make it more difficult for stronger opponents to enter the bidding. Without the Fishbein convention, the usual way to counter it is to double the bid requesting partner to bid his strongest suit (i.e. a takeout double) or to bid notrumps to play. The disadvantage of this approach is that a penalty double of a weak opponent might be very profitable, and redefining the double as takeout would make this weapon unavailable. Fishbein's solution was to leave the double for penalties and, by convention, to bid the next suit up from that bid by the opening preemptor to ask for a takeout; the conventional bid can only be made by the opener's Left Hand Opponent (LHO). For example, if opener bids 3♦, LHO would bid 3♥ for takeout. Over 3♠ LHO would bid 4♣; double would be for penalty and 3NT to play.
