= Arnold Richards =

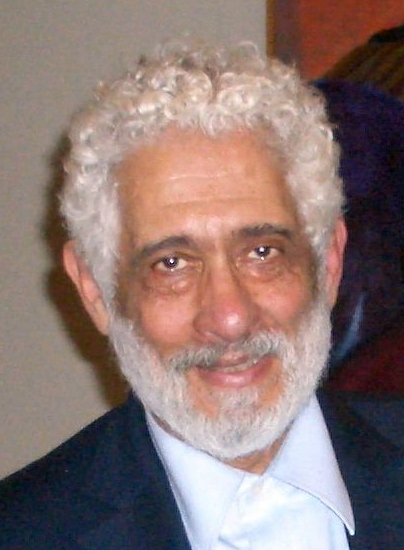
- Occupation: Psychoanalyst
- Spouse: Arlene Kramer Richards
- Website: Official website

Arnold Richards (born August 1934) is a psychoanalyst and former editor of The American Psychoanalyst and Journal of the American Psychoanalytic Association (JAPA). Richards also is the Training and Supervising Analyst at the New York Psychoanalytic Institute. He is the founder and Editor-in-Chief of the International Psychoanalysis.net magazine. Richards is a board member and former chair of YIVO.

== Career ==
Richards became an editor for The American Psychoanalyst in 1989. He redesigned the format and content of the newsletter during his term as editor. From 1994 to 2003, Richards was an editor for the Journal of the American Psychoanalytic Association (JAPA). He is a faculty member of the American Institute of Psychoanalysis and the Metropolitan Institute of Psychoanalysis and Psychotherapy. Richards presented the 50th annual Leo Baeck Memorial lecture in 2006. In 2014, he participated in the Senior Sino-American Continual Training Project of Psychoanalysis.

=== Writing and research ===
He presented "A.A. Brill: The Politics of Exclusion and the Politics of Pluralism" in November 1995. He presented "The Organizational Structure of the American Psychoanalytic Association: The Politics of Exclusion" at the 37th annual conference of the International Psychohistorical Association in June 2014.

== Awards and recognition ==
Richards received the Mary S. Sigourney Award in 2000. He is a member of the American Psychoanalytic Association and received its Distinguished Contributor Award in 2004. In 2013, Richards received the Hans W. Loewald award.

== Personal life ==
Richards' parents were Jewish immigrants from Eastern Europe; his father was from Podolia and his mother was from Galicia. Richards grew up in Brooklyn, New York in a Yiddish and English speaking household.

Richards is married to Arlene Kramer Richards, a practicing psychoanalyst, and lives in an apartment in Manhattan and a condo in Palm Beach, Florida.

== Bibliography ==
- Psychoanalysis: The Science of Mental Conflict - Essays in Honor of Charles Brenner (1986) ISBN 9780881630541
- Fantasy, Myth, and Reality: Essays in Honor of Jacob A. Arlow (1988) ISBN 9780823618873
- The Spectrum of Psychoanalysis: Essays in Honor of Martin S. Bergmann (1994) ISBN 9780823645053
- The Perverse Transference and Other Matters: Essays in Honor of R. Horacio Etchegoyen (1997) ISBN 9780765700711
- Psychology of Women: Psychoanalytic Perspectives (2000) ISBN 9780823655885
- The Jewish World of Sigmund Freud: Essays on Cultural Roots and the Problem of Religious Identity (2010) ISBN 9780786444243

=== Selected publications ===
- 2013 Letter to the Editor re Paper by James Anderson, Clio’s Psyche 19(4) 486-388. http://internationalpsychoanalysis.net/2013/10/15/letter-to-the-editor-response-to-jim-anderson-by-arnold-richards/
- 2014 APM Paper in The Bulletin of the Association for Psychoanalytic Medicine. http://internationalpsychoanalysis.net/2013/05/10/apm-paper-by-arnold-richards/
- 2013 Book Essay on The Second Century of Psychoanalysis: Evolving Perspectives on Therapeutic Action Arnold D. Richards Journal of the American Psychoanalytic Association Volume 61(1): pp. 157–165.
- 2013. Freud's Free Clinics: A Tale of Two Continents. The Psychoanalytic Review Vol. 100, No. 6, pp. 819–838.
- 2014 A Dangerous Legacy: Judaism and the Psychoanalytic Movement by Hans Reijzer Reviewed Arnold D. Richards in (2014). The Psychoanalytic Review Vol. 101, No. 6, pp. 925–938.
- 2015 What is Jewish about Psychoanalysis? A review of Hans Reijzer’s A Dangerous Legacy: Judaism and the Psychoanalytic Movement Clio’s Psyche. In Press
- 2014 Freud’s Jewish identity and Psychoanalysis as a Science. Journal of the American Psychoanalytic Association 62:987-1003.
- 2014) A Dangerous Legacy: Judaism and the Psychoanalytic Movement. By Hans Reijzer. London: Karnac Books, 2011, 236 pp. £9.99 (paperback).. Psychoanal. Rev., 101(6):931-938.
- 2015. Psychoanalysis in Crisis: The Danger of Ideology. Psychoanalytic Review 102(3):389-405.
- 2018. A Cultural Citizen of the World: Sigmund Freud's Knowledge and use of British and American Writings: By S. S. Prawer. Abingdon, UK / New York: Modern Humanities Research Association / Routledge, 2009. 156 pp.. Psychoanalytic Quarterly 87(2):383-387.
- 2018. Dreams and the Wish for Immortality. Canadian Journal Psychoanalysis 26(1):142-158.
- 2018. Some Thoughts on Self-Disclosure. Psychoanalytic Review 105(2):137-156.
- 2020 The Organizational Life of Psychoanalysis, by Kenneth Eisold. Routledge, New York, 2018, 262 pp.. Psychodynamic Psychology, 48(2):201-211.
- 2020. The Organizational Structure of the American Psychoanalytic Association: The Politics of Exclusion. Psychoanalytic Review 107(3):211-227.
- References

=== Sources ===
Richards, A. (2017). Psychoanalysis in Crisis: Art, Science or Ideology? JASPER, vol. 1, # 1, pp. 43–59.
