= The Paper Store (retailer) =

American retail company

TPS Group Holdings LLC
- Type: Private
- Industry: Retail
- Founded: 1964
- Founder: Bob Anderson
- Headquarters: Acton, Massachusetts, United States
- Number of locations: over 100
- Key people: Tom Anderson (CEO)
- Products: Apparel, greeting cards, jewelry, specialty gifts
- Website: https://www.thepaperstore.com

The Paper Store is an American retail company based in Acton, Massachusetts, that owns and operates over 100 specialty gift stores in the northeast, Florida, and Illinois. It operates under the brands The Paper Store, Gifts & More at The Paper Store, and Uncharted. The company offers "on-trend" products catering to a predominantly female demographic, with a selection that includes (but is not limited to) apparel, accessories, jewelry, bath and body products, stationery, baby and toddler gifts, kids' toys, jigsaw puzzles, books, and Hallmark Cards greeting cards. The Paper Store is currently the largest interdependently-owned group of Hallmark Gold Crown stores in the United States. Other highly recognizable brands featured in their stores include Alex and Ani, Vera Bradley, Lilly Pulitzer, Kate Spade, Life Is Good, Vineyard Vines, Pura Vida, Hydro Flask

== History ==
Bob Anderson founded The Paper Store in 1964, when he purchased a 700 sq. ft. newsstand in Maynard, Massachusetts after having graduated from Babson College. Soon after founding The Paper Store, the Andersons expanded its reach in the community through distribution of its papers to local homes. They would soon carry and deliver The Shopper, a local publication, to homes in Maynard and surrounding towns. A second location eventually opened in Clinton, Massachusetts, at which time The Paper Store grew its inventory with office products, books, and greeting cards.

The business would continue to prosper, eventually splitting its successful distribution and retail components in 1972. In 1989, Bob's son John Anderson proposed significant growth in the company, which ultimately led to the opening of additional stores across multiple states.

In 2011, The Paper Store invested over $10 million to build "shop within a shop" areas featuring the jewelry brand Alex and Ani in many of their stores - a significant move for the company.

In November 2021, it was announced that the retailer would be acquiring 14 Hallmark stores in Florida, further expanding its business.

As of 2022, The Paper Store had expanded to include 100 brick and mortar locations throughout the Northeast and Florida. Bob's son Tom Anderson is CEO.

In November 2024, The Paper Store opened its first store in the Chicago area, under the new brand Uncharted. It has since opened five more Uncharted store locations in the Chicago area, two in New York, and two in New Jersey.

== Philanthropy ==
As of 2022, The Paper Store raised over $2,000,000 for charities in its stores' communities. Every year, the company holds a "Gift of Giving" charity event in its brick and mortar locations and through its online retail storefront. The event supports local food pantries, shelters, and more. The Paper Store also directly supports various organizations local to their stores including local school districts and first responders.
