= Mordecai Kaplan =

Lithuanian American rabbi (1881–1983)

Rabbi Mordecai Menahem Kaplan
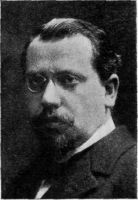
- Kaplan c. 1915

Personal life
- Born: Mottel Kaplan; June 11, 1881 Sventiany, Vilna Governorate, Russian Empire (Note: Present-day Švenčionys, Lithuania)
- Died: November 8, 1983 (aged 102) New York City, U.S.
- Buried: Glendale, New York, U.S.
- Spouse: Lena Rubin (1908–1958); Rivka Rieger (1959–1983)
- Children: Judith Eisenstein, Hadassah Musher, Naomi Wenner, and Selma Jaffe-Goldman

Religious life
- Religion: Judaism
- Denomination: Orthodox Judaism; Conservative Judaism; Reconstructionist Judaism

Jewish leader
- Organization: Jewish Theological Seminary of America, Society for the Advancement of Judaism, Reconstructionist Rabbinical College
- Semikhah: Jewish Theological Seminary of America

Mordecai Menahem Kaplan (Hebrew: מֹרְדֳּכַי מְנַחֵם קַפְלַן; June 11, 1881 – November 8, 1983) was an American Conservative rabbi, writer, Jewish educator, professor, theologian-philosopher, activist, and religious leader who founded the Reconstructionist movement of Judaism with his son-in-law, Rabbi Ira Eisenstein. He has been described as a "towering figure" in the recent history of Judaism for his influential work in adapting it to modern society, contending that Judaism should be a unifying and creative force by stressing the cultural and historical character of the religion as well as theological doctrine.

== Early life and education ==
Mordecai Menahem Kaplan was born Mottel Kaplan in Sventiany in the Russian Empire (present-day Švenčionys in Lithuania) on June 11, 1881, the son of Haya (née Anna) and Rabbi Israel Kaplan. His father, who received semikhah (סְמִיכָה) by leading Lithuanian Jewish scholars, went to serve as a dayan (דַּיָּן, 'judge') in the court of Chief Rabbi Jacob Joseph in New York City in 1888. Mordecai was brought over to New York in 1889, at the age of nine.

Although affiliated with the most traditional Orthodox Jewish institutions and personalities on the Lower East Side, his father persisted in non-conformist openness to trends he had already exhibited in Russia: He hosted discussions in his home with maverick Hebrew Bible critic Arnold Ehrlich, withdrew his son from Etz Chaim Yeshiva in Manhattan, enrolled him in public school, and later sent him to the Jewish Theological Seminary of America (JTSA) to pursue modern Orthodox semikhah. Although not the norm amongst first-generation immigrants, who tended to be very conservative and traditional, his father was not alone in this kind of religious broad-mindedness. Kaplan's early education was strictly Orthodox, but, by the time he reached secondary school, he had been attracted to heterodox opinions (particularly regarding the critical approach to the Hebrew Bible). To counter this, Israel hired a tutor to study Maimonides's Guide for the Perplexed with Mordecai.

In 1893, Kaplan began studying for ordination at JTSA, which, at that time, was a Modern Orthodox Jewish institution founded to strengthen Orthodoxy and combat the hegemony of Reform Judaism. In 1895, he also began studies at the City College of New York (CCNY), which he attended in the morning; Kaplan attended JTSA in the evening. After graduating from CCNY in 1900, he went to Columbia University to study philosophy, sociology, and education, and received a master's degree and doctorate. Majoring in philosophy, he wrote his master's thesis on the ethical philosophy of Henry Sidgwick. His lecturers included the philosopher of ethical culture Felix Adler and the sociologist Franklin Henry Giddings.

== Career ==
Kaplan was ordained at the Jewish Theological Seminary of America in 1902. His understanding of Judaism differed from that of the seminary, but he maintained a long-standing connection with the institution, teaching there for more than fifty years. He became principal of its teachers' institute in 1909, served as dean in 1931, and retired afterwards 1963. In 1903, Kaplan was appointed as administrator of the religious school at Congregation Kehilath Jeshurun (KJ), a gradually modernizing Orthodox synagogue in Yorkville, Manhattan, consisting of newly affluent and acculturating East European Jews who had migrated north from the Lower East Side. By April 1904, he was appointed as rabbi of the congregation.

Based on his diary, by around this time (1904, age 23), Kaplan already had serious misgivings about Orthodoxy's ability to satisfy his spiritual needs and its unwillingness to modernize. By 1905, he had begun to doubt the divine inspiration of the Tanakh and its laws, as well as the efficacy of prayers and rituals; by 1907, he had informed his parents of his feelings. Because he was serving as a congregational rabbi, this created significant dissonance, resulting in considerable internal turmoil and anguish over the hypocrisy of practicing and preaching what he no longer believed. His private diaries and papers reveal that he was tortured within because his beliefs about the nature of religion and of Judaism conflicted with his duties as the leader of an Orthodox congregation.

In 1908, Kaplan married Lena Rubin, left KJ, and was ordained by Rabbi Yitzchak Yaacov Reines while on his honeymoon in Europe. In 1909, he became principal of the newly formed teachers' institute at JTSA (which had joined the Conservative movement), a position he held until his retirement in 1963. Kaplan was not primarily interested in academic scholarship, but rather in teaching future rabbis and educators to reinterpret Judaism and make Jewish identity meaningful under modern circumstances. As a result, his work during this time contributed greatly to the future of Jewish education in America.

Even those who disagreed with his views appreciated Kaplan's direct approach. They were impressed by his emphasis on intellectual honesty in confronting the challenges posed by modern thought to traditional Jewish beliefs and practices. In his approach to midrash and philosophies of religion, Kaplan combined scientific scholarship with creative application of the texts to contemporary problems. Kaplan's Reconstructionist philosophy influenced not only his own immediate students but, through them, his extensive writings and public lectures over several decades, the American Jewish community at large. Many of his ideas, such as Judaism as a civilization (and not merely a religion or nationality); bat mitzvah; egalitarian involvement of women in synagogal and communal life; the synagogue as a Jewish center and not merely a place of worship; and living as Jews in a multicultural society, eventually came to be accepted as commonplace and implemented in all but strictly Orthodox segments of the community.

Early in his career, Kaplan became a devotee of the scientific and historical study of the Hebrew Bible. He was the leading educator to confront rabbis, teachers, and laity with the changes in Jewish thought that had become necessary once the Bible had been exposed to modern techniques of examination and interpretation. But far from denigrating the genius of the biblical text, Kaplan taught his students to regard it as an indispensable source for an understanding of Jewish peoplehood and Jewish civilization.

In 1912, Kaplan was an advisor to the creators of the Young Israel movement of Modern Orthodox Judaism, together with Rabbi Israel Friedlander. (Note: According to Kraut (1998), Kaplan "worked for the Young Israel initiative that in conception was nondenominational...")

In speeches and articles in 1912 and 1916, Kaplan chided American Orthodox Judaism for not adequately embracing modernity. He was a leader in creating the Jewish community center concept. Around 1916–1918, he organized the Jewish Center in New York, a community organization with a Modern Orthodox synagogue as its nucleus—the first of its kind in the United States—and served as its rabbi until 1922.

Kaplan's ideology and rhetoric had been evolving over the decade, but it was not until 1920 that he finally took a clear and irrevocable stand, criticizing "the fundamental doctrine of Orthodoxy, which is that tradition is infallible... The doctrine of infallibility rules out of court all research and criticism and demands implicit faith in the truth of whatever has come down from the past. It precludes all conscious development in thought and practice..." However, he was even more critical of Reform Judaism, saying that the movement was worse due to what he called its "absolute break with the Judaism of the past".

Nonetheless, Kaplan remained as the rabbi of the center until around 1922, when he resigned due to ideological conflicts with some of the lay leadership. He, along with a sizeable group of congregants, then established the Society for the Advancement of Judaism, which later became the core of the Reconstructionist movement.

Kaplan held the first public celebration of a bat mitzvah in the United States, for his daughter Judith Kaplan, on March 18, 1922, at the Society for the Advancement of Judaism. Judith read from the Torah at this ceremony, a role that had traditionally been reserved for males.

In 1925, the American Zionist Organization sent Kaplan to Jerusalem as its official representative for the opening of Hebrew University.

In 1929, the American Jewish philanthropist, Julius Rosenwald, offered a $10,000 prize to the writer who could provide the best answer to "How can Judaism best adjust itself to and influence modern life?" The competition was won by Rabbi Kaplan, who defined Judaism as an evolving religion which needs to embrace pluralism and rebuild or "reconstruct" itself. This philosophy was further illucidated in his books, which were financed by the prize money.

From 1934 until 1970, Kaplan wrote a series of books in which he expressed his Reconstructionist ideology, an attempt to adapt Judaism to modern realities that he believed necessitated a new conception of God. His basic ideology was first defined in his 1934 work Judaism as a Civilization: Toward the Reconstruction of American-Jewish Life.

In 1935, a biweekly periodical (The Reconstructionist Journal) was started under Kaplan's editorship, which was "dedicated to the advancement of Judaism as a religious civilization, to the upbuilding of Eretz Yisrael (the Land of Israel) as the spiritual center of the Jewish People, and to the furtherance of universal freedom, justice, and peace." Kaplan further refined the goals of his ideology in subsequent books, including: The Meaning of God in Modern Jewish Religion (1937), Judaism Without Supernaturalism (1958), and The Religion of Ethical Nationhood (1970).

Kaplan saw his ideology as a "school of thought" rather than a separate denomination, and in fact resisted pressure to turn it into one, fearing that it might further fragment the American Jewish community and hoping that his ideas could be applied across denominations.

Kaplan was dissatisfied with traditional rituals and prayer and sought ways to make them more meaningful to Jews who agreed with him. In 1941, he wrote the controversial Reconstructionist Haggadah, for which he received criticism from colleagues at JTSA. However, this did not stop him from publishing the Reconstructionist Sabbath Prayer Book in 1945, in which, among other unorthodoxies, he denied the literal accuracy of the biblical text. As a result, he was excommunicated by the Union of Orthodox Rabbis of the United States and Canada, who held a herem ceremony at which his prayer book was burned.

Although Kaplan preferred that Reconstructionism remain a non-denominational school of thought rather than a separate denomination, in the late 1940s to early 1950s, a number of laypeople in synagogues throughout the United States decided to organize an independent federation of Reconstructionist synagogues, and by 1954, the Federation of Reconstructionist Congregations and Havurot was organized. As the years passed, the number of affiliates grew, but it was not until the late 1960s that the movement actually became a separate denomination, when the Reconstructionist Rabbinical College opened its doors in 1968. By the beginning of the 21st century, it would include over 100 congregations and havurot.

=== Establishment of University of Judaism ===
Kaplan wrote a seminal essay, "On the Need for a University of Judaism", in which he called for a university setting that could present Judaism as a deep culture and developing civilization. His proposal included programs on dramatic and fine arts to stimulate Jewish artistic creativity, a college to train Jews to live fully in American and Jewish culture as contributing citizens, a school to train Jewish educators, and a rabbinical seminary to train creative and visionary rabbis. In 1947, with the participation of Rabbi Simon Greenberg, Kaplan's efforts culminated in the establishment of the University of Judaism, later known as the American Jewish University, in Los Angeles. His vision continues to find expression in the university's graduate, undergraduate, rabbinical, and continuing education programs.

=== Relationship with Orthodox Judaism ===
Kaplan began his career as an Orthodox rabbi at Congregation Kehilath Jeshurun in New York City, assisted in the founding of the Young Israel movement of Modern Orthodox Judaism in 1912, and was the first rabbi hired by the new (Orthodox) Jewish Center in Manhattan when it was founded in 1918. He proved too radical in his religious and political views for the organization and resigned from the Jewish Center in 1921. He was the subject of a number of polemical articles published by Rabbi Leo Jung (who became the rabbi of the Jewish Center in 1922) in the Orthodox Jewish press.

Kaplan then became involved in the Society for the Advancement of Judaism, where on March 18, 1922, he held (possibly) the first public celebration of a bat mitzvah in America, for his daughter, Judith. This led to considerable criticism of Kaplan in the Orthodox Jewish press.

Kaplan's central idea of understanding Judaism as a religious civilization was an easily accepted position within Conservative Judaism, but his naturalistic conception of God was not as acceptable. Even at the Conservative movement's JTS, as The Forward writes, "He was an outsider, and often privately considered leaving the institution. In 1941, the faculty illustrated its distaste with Kaplan by penning a unanimous letter to the professor of homiletics, expressing complete disgust with Kaplan's The New Haggadah for the Passover seder.

Four years later, seminary professors Alexander Marx, Louis Ginzberg and Saul Lieberman went public with their rebuke by writing a letter to the Hebrew newspaper Hadoar, lambasting Kaplan's prayer book and his entire career as a rabbi." In 1945, the Union of Orthodox Rabbis "formally assembled to excommunicate from Judaism what it deemed to be the community's most heretical voice: Rabbi Mordecai Kaplan, the man who eventually would become the founder of Reconstructionist Judaism. Kaplan, a critic of both Orthodox and Reform Judaism, believed that Jewish practice should be reconciled with modern thought, a philosophy reflected in his Sabbath Prayer Book..."

Due to Kaplan's evolving position on Jewish theology and the liturgy, he was also condemned as a heretic by members of Young Israel, which he had assisted in founding. His followers attempted to induce him to formally leave Conservative Judaism, but he stayed at JTS until he retired in 1963. Finally, in 1968, his closest disciple and son-in-law Ira Eisenstein founded a separate school, the Reconstructionist Rabbinical College, in which Kaplan's philosophy, Reconstructionist Judaism, would be promoted as a separate Jewish religious movement.

=== Kaplan's theology ===
Per Rifat Sonsino, Kaplan taught:

To believe in God means to accept life on the assumption that it harbors conditions in the outer world and drives in the human spirit which together impel man to transcend himself. To believe in God means to take for granted that it is man's destiny to rise above the brute and to eliminate all forms of violence and exploitation from human society. In brief, God is the Power in the cosmos that gives human life the direction that enables the human being to reflect the image of God.

Not all of Kaplan's writings on the subject were consistent; his position evolved somewhat over the years, and two distinct theologies can be discerned with careful reading. The view more popularly associated with Kaplan is strict naturalism, à la John Dewey, which has been criticized as using religious terminology to mask a nontheistic (if not outright atheistic) position—one JTS colleague in the 1950s, Will Herberg, went so far as to compare it to the position of Charles Maurras toward the Catholic Church. A second strand of Kaplanian theology makes clear that God has ontological reality, a real and absolute existence independent of human beliefs, while rejecting classical theism and any belief in miracles. In 1973, he was one of the signers of the Humanist Manifesto II.

== Zionism ==
Kaplan had a complex relationship with the State of Israel and Zionism that changed over the course of his life. In his 1934 book, Judaism as a Civilization, he wrote that the Zionist project was indispensable to the “well-cushioned life” of Jews around the world, Jenna Weissman Joselit writes in her 2026 biography of Kaplan. Kaplan began spending more time in Israel during the 1930s, including two full years between 1937 and 1939, and his first-hand experience of the complex realities inherent in Zionism – the difficulty of resolving the conflict between democracy and religion, and the tense relationship between Jews and Arabs -- soured him on the Zionist project. “The years he spent in the Holy Land impelled Kaplan to temper his belief in Zionism as the antidote to what ailed the modern Jewish world.” Late in his life, however, Kaplan spent a lot of time in Israel with his second wife, Rivka Rieger, who was Israeli.

== Personal life ==
Kaplan was a prolific writer. In addition to his published works, he kept a journal from 1913 until the late 1970s, comprising 27 volumes, each with 350–400 handwritten pages. The journal is quite possibly the largest by a Jew, and may even be one of the most extensive on record.

Following the death of his first wife Lena in 1958, Kaplan married Rivka Rieger, an Israeli artist, in 1959. Kaplan died in New York City in 1983 at the age of 102. His funeral was held at the Society for the Advancement of Judaism, which he founded.

Kaplan was survived by Rivka and his daughters, Judith Kaplan Eisenstein, Hadassah Musher, Naomi Wenner, and Selma Jaffe-Goldman, as well as seven grandchildren and nine great-grandchildren.

== Awards ==
- 1971: National Jewish Book Award in the Jewish Thought for The Religion of Ethical Nationhood

== Bibliography ==
Kaplan was a prolific writer. His work Judaism as a Civilization was published in 1934 when Kaplan was 53. A full bibliography of over 400 items can be found in The American Judaism of Mordecai Kaplan, ed. by Emanuel S. Goldsmith, Mel Sculpt, and Robert Seltzer (1990).

=== Books ===
- Family Purity (Taarath Hamishpoco) (1924)
- Judaism as a Civilization (1934)
- Judaism in Transition (1936)
- Mesillat Yesharim: The Path of the Upright, with introduction and a new translation by Kaplan (1936)
- The Meaning of God in Modern Jewish Religion (1937)
- The New Haggadah (1941)
- The Sabbath Prayer Book (1945)
- The Future of the American Jew (1948)
- The Faith of America: Prayers, Readings, and Songs for the Celebration of American Holidays (1951)
- Ha-emunah ve-hamusar (Faith and Ethics) (1954)
- A New Zionism (1955)
- Questions Jews Ask (1956)
- Judaism Without Supernaturalism (1958)
- A New Zionism: Second Enlarged Edition (1959)
- The Greater Judaism in the Making: : A Study of the Modern Evolution of Judaism (1960)
- The Purpose and Meaning of Jewish Existence: A People in the Image of God (1964)
- Not So Random Thoughts: Witty and Profound Observations on Society, Religion, and Jewish Life
- The Religion of Ethical Nationhood: Judaism's Contribution to World Peace (1970)
- If not now, when?: Toward a reconstitution of the Jewish people; conversations between Mordecai M. Kaplan and Arthur A. Cohen (1973)

=== Articles ===
- 'What Judaism Is Not,' The Menorah Journal, Vol. 1, No. 4, (October 1915),
- 'What Is Judaism,' The Menorah Journal, Vol. 1, No. 5, (December 1915),
- 'Isaiah 6:1–11,' Journal of Biblical Literature, Vol. 45, No. 3/4, (1926).
- 'The Effect of Intercultural Contacts upon Judaism,' The Journal of Religion, (January 1934).
- 'The Evolution of the Idea of God in Jewish Religion,' The Jewish Quarterly Review, Vol. 57, (1967).

== See also ==
- American philosophy
- List of American philosophers
