= Haredim and Zionism =

Haredi Jewish views on the Zionist movement

Ponevezh yeshiva on Israel Independence Day in Bnei Brak, Israel

From the founding of political Zionism in the 1890s, Haredi Jewish leaders voiced objections to its secular orientation, and before the establishment of the State of Israel, the vast majority of Haredi Jews were opposed to Zionism, like adherents of early Reform Judaism, but with distinct reasoning. This was chiefly due to the concern that secular nationalism would redefine the Jewish nation from a religious community based in their alliance to God for whom adherence to religious laws were "the essence of the nation's task, purpose, and right to exist," to simply an ethnic group like any other, as well as the view that it was forbidden for the Jews to re-constitute Jewish rule in the Land of Israel before the arrival of the Messiah. Those rabbis who did support Jewish resettlement in Palestine in the late 19th century had no intention to conquer Palestine and declare its independence from the rule of the Ottoman Turks, and some preferred that only observant Jews be allowed to settle there.

During the 1930s, some European Haredi leaders encouraged their followers not to leave for Palestine, where the Zionists were gaining influence. When the dangers facing European Jewry became clear, the Haredi Agudath Israel organization decided to co-operate with Zionist leaders to an extent, in order to allow religious Jews the possibility of seeking refuge in Palestine. Some Agudah members in Palestine preferred to form an alliance against the Zionist movement with Arab nationalists, but this never occurred. After the creation of the state of Israel, each individual movement within ultra-Orthodox Judaism charted its own path in their approach to the State of Israel.

A study in late 2006 claimed that just over a third of Israelis considered Haredim to be the most hated group in Israel. According to a 2016 Pew survey, 33% of Israeli Haredim say that the term "Zionist" describes them accurately.

== History ==
=== Early opposition to Zionism ===
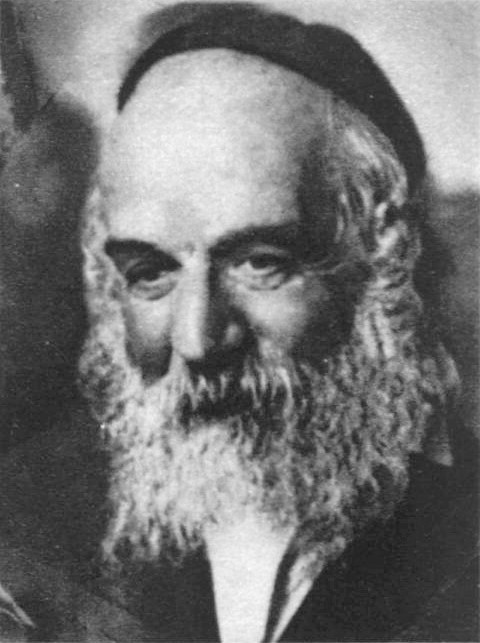
Grand Rabbi Chaim Elazar Spira (d. 1937) was the most outspoken voice of Haredi anti-Zionism

In the hope of winning over the Hasidic masses to the Zionist Organization, Theodor Herzl endeavoured to garner support from one of the most prominent rabbis in the Austro-Hungarian Empire, David Moshe Friedman (d. 1903), the Rebbe of Chortkov. He maintained contact with him for over three years, during which time he tried to convene a conference of rabbis in order to promote Zionism; however, nothing ever materialized. Friedman had been a long-time supporter of efforts to settle Jews in Palestine on the strict condition that they adhere to Jewish law. He had in fact been an early member of Ahavath Zion, a Zionist organization that was established in 1897 with the specific purpose of informing religious Galician Jews about the plan to establish a Jewish national home. Although Ahavath Zion was successful in attracting thousands of members and numerous rabbis from smaller communities, it could not stem the rising anti-Zionist sentiment among the majority of Orthodox leaders. Besides Friedman, they simply could not persuade any of the other great Hasidic leaders to support the Zionist project. The Hasidim were particularly vociferous in their opposition to Zionism and they often protested against the Zionists. They even went so far as to ban the Star of David, originally a religious symbol which only appeared in synagogues, but it had now become "defiled" by the Zionists.

In 1889, Rabbi Joseph Dov Soloveichik proclaimed that early Zionist initiatives resembled the 17th-century false messianic sect which was headed by Sabbatai Zevi. His son Rabbi Hayyim Soloveichik further warned: "The people of Israel should take care not to join a venture that threatens their souls, to destroy religion, and is a stumbling block to the House of Israel." When the Zionists in Brisk claimed that Zionism would stem the tide of Jewish assimilation, Soloveichik felt that what mattered most for Judaism was the quality, not the quantity of it.

Powerful condemnations of political Zionism continued into the twentieth century. In 1903, Rabbi Sholom Dovber Schneersohn of Lubavitch published Kuntres Uma'ayan, which contained a strong polemic against Zionism. He opposed the Religious Zionist movement, and was deeply concerned that secular nationalism would replace Judaism as the foundation of Jewish identity. Rabbi Baruch Halberstam (d. 1906) took a leading role in opposing Zionism, in line with the position held by his father, Hayyim Halberstam of Sanz.

In 1912, Haredi leaders in Europe founded the Agudath Israel organisation which hoped to find a "solution to all the problems facing the Jewish people in the Spirit of the Torah." From the outset, the Agudah vehemently opposed the Zionist movement's replacement of the historic religious bond to the land of Israel with secular nationalism. Israel Meir Kagan stated that the fate of the Jewish nation was to remain in exile until the arrival of the Messiah. But with the spread of anti-Semitism in Europe, some Orthodox leaders became more favourable towards the aims of Zionism. Rabbi Isaac Breuer implored Agudah members in 1934 "not to leave Jewish history to the Zionists", hoping that religious Jews would assist in establishing a Jewish homeland. Others remained staunchly opposed, chief among them the rabbi of Munkács, Chaim Elazar Spira (d. 1937), who was the fiercest opponent of Zionism among Hasidic rabbis. Spira saw Zionism as a denial of the Divine Redemption and faith in the Messiah. He even objected to Agudath Israel because of its support for immigration to Palestine. In 1936, he initiated a publication against the Zionist enterprise which was endorsed by 150 rabbis. During the wartime period, Rabbi Elchonon Wasserman (1875–1941) of Baranowicze wrote a pamphlet in which he blamed the Zionists for the persecution of Jews in Europe. He rejected the notion that a secular Jewish state could be considered the "advent of Redemption." The goal of Zionism was to uproot religion and Jewish tradition. At the 1937 Agudath Israel Great Assembly in Marienbad, most discussions were devoted to the question of the Jewish State and the Nazi rise to power in Germany, and increasing anti-Semitism in Poland and Lithuania. Palestine beaconed as a refuge for the religious European masses whose situation was gradually worsening. While the majority of attendees rejected the establishment of a secular Jewish State on principle as well as on practical grounds, a minority, which was influenced by the dire situation, was in favour of it.

=== Concern in Palestine ===
Within Palestine itself, the local Ashkenazi Haredi community of the Old Yishuv was opposed to Zionism. As Zionist settlement was underway during the 19th and 20th centuries, they were alarmed by the influx of predominantly non-religious Jews who wished to establish a secular state in the Holy Land and threatened the peaceful relations the Orthodox community had enjoyed with their Arab neighbors until this point. The chief rabbi of the Ashkenazi community in Jerusalem, Rabbi Yosef Chaim Sonnenfeld, often referred to the Zionists as "evil men and ruffians" and claimed that "Hell had entered the Land of Israel with Herzl." Sonnenfeld did not want the Orthodox Jewish community to become subject to secular Zionist authority. The spokesman for the anti-Zionist Ashkenazi community in Jerusalem, Dr Jacob Israël de Haan, endeavoured to form an alliance with the Arab nationalist leadership and hoped to reach an agreement that would allow unrestricted Jewish settlement in Arab lands in return for the relinquishment of Jewish political aspirations. In June 1924, de Haan was assassinated by the Haganah after having conveyed his proposals to King Hussein and his sons, Faisal and Abdullah.

The 1929 Palestine riots and the Nazi rise to power led to a crisis within the anti-Zionist Agudah camp. Some still hoped for a Jewish-Arab alliance against the Zionists, while others, such as Yitzhak-Meir Levin and Jacob Rosenheim faced a difficult dilemma. They felt that such an alliance would not be accepted by the masses of Haredi European Jews, yet they did not wish to cooperate with the Zionists. Moshe Blau, another Agudah member, contended that, "No matter how much the Haredi hates the non-religious, heretical, apostate Zionists, he hates the despicable Arab a hundred times over." The brutal murder by Arabs of dozens of Haredi Jews in Hebron and Safed damaged the already difficult relationships between the communities. In 1937, the Central Committee of Agudath Israel in the Land of Israel issued a declaration claiming that secular Jewish rule would pose a danger to Orthodox Jewry, while indicating potential acceptance of a Jewish state if it were a Halachic state. It stated:

Agudath Israel in the Land of Israel rejects outright any attempt at despoiling the Land of Israel of its sanctity and considers the proposal to establish a secular Jewish state in Palestine as a hazard to the lofty role of the Jewish People as a holy nation. Agudath Israel in the Land of Israel declares that Orthodox Jewry could only agree to a Jewish state in all the Land of Israel if it were possible for the basic constitution of this state to guarantee Torah rule in the overall public and national life.

The Agudah in Europe grudgingly began to cooperate with the Jewish Agency and other Zionist bodies in an effort to alleviate the situation facing European Jews. In response to this, Amram Blau and Aharon Katzenellenbogen of Jerusalem broke away from Agudah in 1938 to form Neturei Karta who refused to have any dealing with the Zionists. During the 1940s the Neturei Karta became increasingly critical of the Agudah's position and in 1945 they succeeded in expelling Agudah members from the Edah HaChareidis. In 1947, Chief Rabbi of Jerusalem Yosef Tzvi Dushinsky petitioned the UN on behalf of his 60,000 strong community that Jerusalem not be included in the Jewish state and pleaded that the city be placed under international control.

=== Aftermath of the Holocaust ===
Before and during the Second World War, Haredi opposition to the Zionists persisted. But after the war, the devastating consequences of the Holocaust softened the position of many towards Zionism. The ultra-orthodox in Eastern Europe had been murdered in vast numbers; whole communities had been wiped out. One rabbi, Yisachar Shlomo Teichtal, hiding in Budapest in 1942 and witnessing the persecution of the Jews, renounced his previous hostility to the Zionist movement, and instead strongly criticized the Orthodox establishment for not taking the lead in re-establishing the Jewish homeland.

After World War II, many Jewish refugees found themselves in displaced person camps. The Zionists controlled a camp for Jewish refugee children near Haifa, Israel where, according to the Haredi-affiliated newspaper Hamodia, they operated an anti-religious policy in an effort to cut off Haredi children from their spiritual roots. To a large extent they were successful, and many children from Haredi homes were "poisoned against religion".

== Post-1948 ==
The relationship between Haredim and Zionism became more complex after the founding of the State of Israel in 1948. Some Haredi groups "with great reluctance permitted" being involved in the political process of the state by voting in elections and accepting state funding. They maintained that since the government is not an ideological Zionist organization (as is the WZO, for example), and also they are not voluntarily choosing to join the Zionists, but rather it is like a partnership that already exists - "and if one wouldn’t participate, the other partner would take over his rights as well." Others have maintained a more hardline rejectionist position, refusing all funding from the Israeli state and abstaining from taking part in the political process. The positions of specific Haredi groups are discussed in greater detail in the remainder of the article.

There is also a growing group of Orthodox Jews known as Hardalim. They are Religious Zionists who moved in their religious observances towards Haredi Judaism. Philosophically, however, they form a part of the Religious Zionist world, and not of the Haredi world.

United Torah Judaism and Shas, which advocate for a halachic state, are the only two Haredi parties in the Israeli Knesset.

Haredim who do not consider themselves Zionists fall into two camps: Non-Zionists and Anti-Zionists. Non-Zionists do not object to the existence of the State of Israel but see no religious significance in it and do not believe that it has anything to do with the messianic redemption. In their eyes, the redemption cannot be brought about through human hands. Anti-Zionists are opposed to the existence of any Jewish state prior to the coming of the Messiah. According to Aharon E. Wexler and Moshe Krakowski, Non-Zionists constitute a majority of the Haredi world.

Anti-Zionist Haredim believe that the existence of a Jewish state prior to the Messianic era is a violation of the Three Oaths. They believe that voting in Israeli elections causes one to become a “partner” in all the sins committed by the government, which includes enabling it to violate the Three Oaths.

== Ideological reasons ==
There are many different ideological reasons for religious opposition to Zionism; however, the main two are most widely expressed by Hasidim and Lithuanian Haredim.

The overarching motive behind many Haredim's opposition to Zionism stems from a traditional and religious view of Jewish identity and peoplehood which runs counter to Zionism's nationalist ideology. Haredim often cite the 10th century rabbinic sage Rav Saadia Goan as spelling out their national identity in terms irreconcilable with modern nationalism; as he wrote in his seminal work Emunah v’Deos (אמונה ודעות), "Our nation, the B’nei Yisrael, is a nation only by virture of its Torah (collective religious teachings)." The opposition extends to ancillary parts of Zionist ideology, such as militarism and organic nationalism, which they hold are incongruous with Jewish religious teachings.

However, there is also an Halachic standpoint which makes the case against Zionism even if Israel would - hypothetically - have been a theocracy, where Israel would have been governed under strict Jewish laws.

Historically, many Rabbis have expressed anti-Zionist opinions because of the "Three Oaths". The Talmud, in Ketubot 111a, mentions that the Jewish people have been bound by three oaths: 1) not to ascend to Eretz Yisrael (the Land of Israel) as a group using force; 2) not to rebel against the nations of the world; and 3) that the nations of the world would not persecute the nation of Israel excessively. Some consider the establishment of the State of Israel to be a violation of these oaths. The first Haredi anti-Zionist movement was Agudath Israel, established in Poland in 1912. Haredi groups and people actively and publicly opposing Zionism are Satmar, Edah HaChareidis, Toldos Aharon, and Neturei Karta, among others.

Amongst the Ashkenazi Orthodox rabbinical leadership, religious Zionists form a minority. Generally speaking, most Sephardi Haredi authorities have never shared the anti-Zionism of their Ashkenazi counterparts, and some (such as the Rabbi Mordechai Eliyahu) are strongly affiliated with Religious Zionism, taking a similar stance to the Hardal movements. However, there are anti-Zionist elements in the Sephardi communities as well. It is known that the late Baba Sali supported and celebrated the anti-Zionist views of the Satmar Rebbe.

== Current positions of Haredi groups ==
=== Groups which do not recognize the State of Israel ===
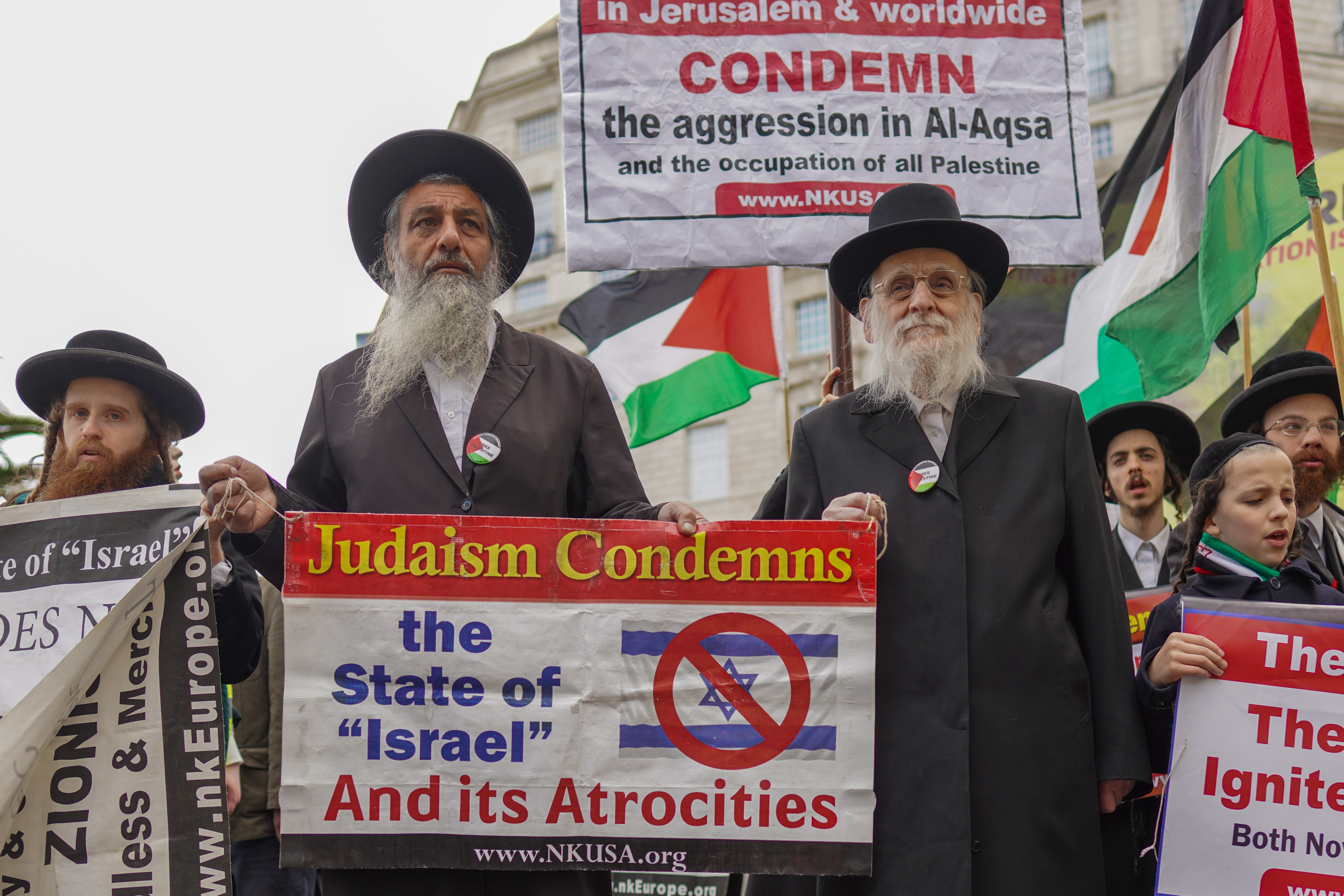
Members of Neturei Karta holding Palestinian flags and placards saying that "Judaism condemns the state of Israel and its atrocities" in London, 2022

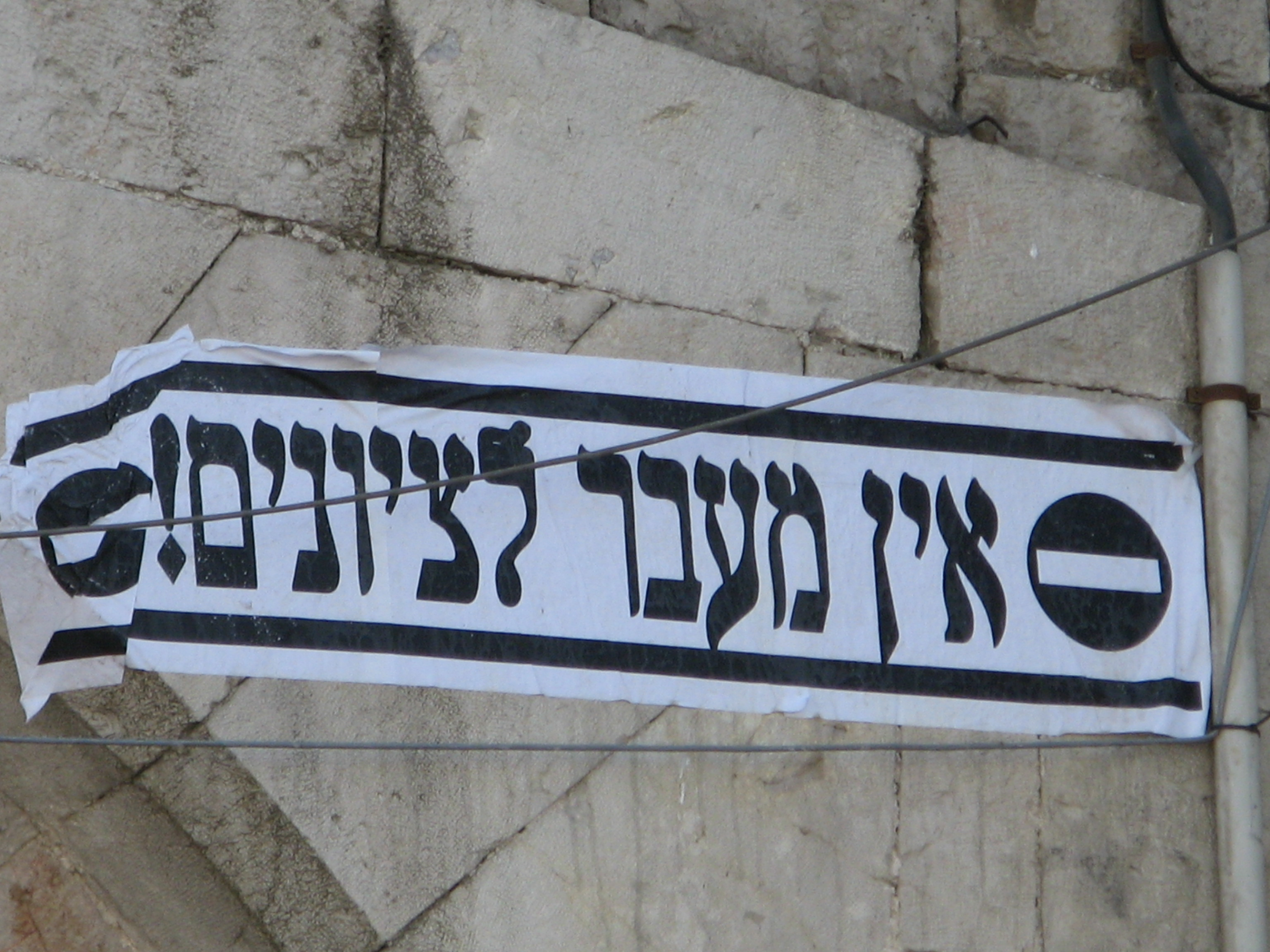
Flyer in the small neighbourhood of Meah Shearim which declares: "No entry to Zionists!"

There are a number of Haredi groups which not only oppose Zionism, but also do not recognize the State of Israel. Among them are the Hasidic sects of Shomer Emunim (and its offshoots, Toldos Aharon, and Toldos Avrohom Yitzchok), Mishkenos HoRoim, and Dushinsky. In July 1947, Rabbi Yosef Tzvi Dushinsky, Chief Rabbi of the Jerusalem-based Edah HaChareidis, declared to the United Nations his "definite opposition to a Jewish state in any part of Palestine". The largest anti-Zionist Hasidic group is Satmar, which has around 100,000 adherents worldwide (as of 2006). The group's position was crystallized by their leader, Rabbi Joel Teitelbaum, who authored comprehensive and polemic tracts detailing his opposition to Zionism. He encouraged his followers who live in Israel to form self-sufficient communities, rejecting social state benefits, and not to vote in Israeli elections. He instructed his people not to visit the Western Wall and other holy sites which had been captured by Israel in the 1967 war.

One of the most extreme sects is the Neturei Karta. Formed in 1938 as a breakaway from Agudath Israel, its 5,000 members are based mainly in Jerusalem and Beit Shemesh. Despite their shared opposition to Zionism, Satmar and other anti-Zionist Haredi groups are frequently critical of the activities of Neturei Karta and publicly distance themselves from them.

=== Groups which do recognize the State of Israel ===
The Agudat Israel is an international organization (with an Israeli association) of various Haredi groups, mainly from the Lithuanian yeshiva communities and Hasidic groups such as Ger and Belz. The Agudah was initially created as an umbrella organization of Orthodox Jews who were united to fight against the Zionist movement. Out of necessity and "to save from the mouth of the lion" they permitted participating in national elections and sending their representatives to the Israeli Knesset, "to actively protect what is holy to us." They did not take full part in it by not serving in its military, and do not celebrate any of the State's official holidays. They are adamantly opposed to serving in the military, because of the gilui arayot, murder, and avodah zarah that exists there. The Agudat Israel party in the Knesset is represented as United Torah Judaism, a collective party of Agudat Israel and Degel HaTorah. It tries to influence the Knesset with a pro-Judaism outlook, by mainly focusing on funding for Jewish education (yeshivas), exemption from military service for Haredi yeshiva students, and trying to safeguard basic rights such as freedom to practice their religion. In general, the Agudath Israel position is supportive of Israel.

==== Lithuanian stream ====
A number of Lithuanian (non-Hasidic) leaders, like the Chazon Ish (1878–1953), Rav Shach (1898–2001), and Rabbi Yosef Sholom Elyashiv (1910-2012), have expressed strongly anti-Zionist views, although the latter was employed by the State of Israel. Examples of this are found in lectures and letters of Rav Shach. One of the newspapers of the Litvish world, the Yated Neeman, regularly publishes articles strongly criticizing Zionism, naming it a "heretical movement". The main Litvish community does vote, as per what many say were the instructions of the Chazon Ish. However, some of the Chazon Ish's disciples dispute this claim. Rabbi Elyashiv would urge his followers to vote for the Degel HaTorah list. Rabbi Shimshon Dovid Pincus, quoted in the book of his speeches about Purim, explains that in each generation, the Yetzer Hara (evil inclination) appears in different forms. Examples he gives are the Enlightenment and communism. He goes on to explain that nowadays, Zionism is a form of the Yetzer Hara.

Rabbi Moshe Feinstein (1895–1986), one of the American leaders of the Lithuanian Jewish world, writes in a responsum to a question whether it is permissible to pray in a synagogue which displays an Israeli flag: "Even though it is improper to bring the flags into shul, and all the more so not to keep them there permanently, and all the more so, not near the Aron Kodesh, and one should try to remove it peacefully. However, to make a fight over this is forbidden."

The Soloveitchik dynasty of Lithuanian Haredi Judaism is known as one of the most elite scholastic dynasties in all of Orthodox Judaism. The dynasty split into two groups in the 20th century, as parts of the Soloveitchik Rabbinical family veered away from their anti-Zionist tradition set by Rabbi Chaim Soloveitchik of Brisk, and adopted views aligned with Modern Orthodox Judaism and Religious Zionism. Ironically, the Zionist faction of the Brisker dynasty is centered in the United States, and the anti-Zionist faction was, and continues to be, centered in Israel. Rabbi Meir Soloveitchik and Rabbi Dovid Soloveitchik, who lead two of the Brisker yeshivas in Jerusalem, continue to be outspoken opponents of Zionism.

==== Hasidic groups ====
While ideologically opposed to Zionism, the moderate Hasidic groups of Ger, Breslov, Vizhnitz, Belz, and Klausenberg do vote in the Israeli elections, and accept Israeli government funding. Ger and Belz are two of the most influential movements behind the Israeli political party Agudat Yisrael, which, together with the Lithuanian Degel HaTorah, forms the United Torah Judaism party. Prominent Gerrer rabbi, Yitzhak-Meir Levin, was a signatory to the Israeli Declaration of Independence. He also served as Minister of Welfare, though today, members of Agudat Israel prefer to serve as Deputy Ministers, or in Knesset Committees. These groups do not observe any days associated with the state, and neither do they recite the Prayer for the State of Israel.

Agudat's position evolved into one generally co-operative with the State of Israel, with an emphasis on supporting religious activities within its borders and the maintenance of Haredi institutions. Some rebbes affiliated with Agudat Yisrael, such as the Sadigura rebbe Avrohom Yaakov Friedman, took more hard-line stances on security, settlements, and disengagement.

==== Chabad-Lubavitch ====
The fifth Lubavitcher Rebbe, Rabbi Sholom Dovber Schneersohn (1860–1920), also known as the RaShaB, published Kuntres Uma'ayan, the beginning of which contains a strong polemic against secular Zionism. He was deeply concerned that secular nationalism would replace Judaism as the foundation of Jewish identity. The seventh Lubavitcher Rebbe, Rabbi Menachem Mendel Schneerson, as wells as his predecessor, Rabbi Yosef Yitzchak Schneerson, nonetheless insisted on trying to increase the observance of the Torah in Israel, both among individuals as well as to make the state's policies more in line with Jewish law and tradition. He also expressed overwhelming support for the State's military endeavors, and vehemently condemned any transfers of land as against Jewish law. His reasoning was based on the code of Jewish law, the Shulchan Aruch, which states that the Sabbath must be violated (carrying weapons) by the residents of a Jewish community (in any country) that borders a hostile Gentile settlement, even if they are threatened in the most subtle manner. He viewed the whole of Israel as such a community, and that was the impetus for his support. He argued that the safety of the Jewish people was paramount, and the physical presence of so many Jews in the land meant that its borders had to be protected as a matter of course. At the same time, he also drew support for his statements from the notion in the Torah that the land of Israel was given to the Jewish people, and that inherent Jewish ownership of the land could not be superseded by mere political interests. Nevertheless, he refused to call the state by name, pointing out that the Holy Land exists independent of any authority that sees itself as sovereign over the land.

Many Chabadniks in the world live in Israel, and there are a great deal of Chabad houses there. Their young men serve in the Israeli military. In line with the Rebbe's instructions to vote for a party that refuses to support giving away parts of the Land of Israel as part of any peace negotiations, Chabad does not endorse any particular party in the election process.

==== Chabad Zionism ====
Chabad Yeshiva students have been joining the IDF in record numbers. There are Chabad synagogues that celebrate Yom Ha'atzmaut.

Chabad Rabbi Shimon Rosenberg spoke at Yom Hazikaron Ceremony in Jerusalem in 2011. He also lit one of the torches at the Zionist state ceremony commemorating Israel Independence Day on behalf of his grandson, Chabad Rabbi Moshe Hotzberg.

Chabad Rabbi Sholom Lipskar celebrated Jerusalem Day at Yeshiva Mercaz HaRav in Jerusalem, the most prominent yeshiva in the Religious Zionist world.

In 2011, Rabbi Menachem Brod of Kfar Chabad, who is a spokesman for Chabad, says the group is Zionist in its support for Israel. He stated: "When the average Israeli citizen says 'Zionism', he is referring to love of the land, strengthening the state, and being close to the nation and the land, to military service. If all this is Zionism, then Chabad is super Zionist!"

==== Sephardim ====
Sephardic Haredim are generally more supportive of Zionism and the State of Israel than their Ashkenazi counterparts, and the number of Sephardic organisations and rabbis who remain opposed to the state constitute a small minority of the Sephardi Haredi leadership. These include the Edah HaCharedit HaSefaradit and Rabbi Yaakov Hillel, who draw their ideology from the writings of Iraqi sage Ben Ish Chai. The Baba Sali praised VaYoel Moshe, the polemic against Zionism written by Rabbi Joel Teitelbaum of Satmar.

In 2010, Shas, the political party which represents the vast majority of Sephardi Haredim in Israel, joined the World Zionist Organization, becoming the first Zionist Haredi party in the Knesset. Shas MK Yaakov Margi claimed that "there's nothing earth-shaking about saying Shas is a Zionist party. We operate as such, we join governments and are partners in the Zionist experience, (our members) serve in the army. There's nothing new here." The party's former spiritual leader, the Sephardic Chief Rabbi of Israel Ovadia Yosef, forbade the flying of the Israeli flag in synagogues, calling it "a reminder of the acts of the evil-doers". While serving as Chief Rabbi, he allowed the recitation of psalms of praise after prayers without a blessing on Israel Independence Day; he did not permit saying Hallel either as a part of the prayer service (where it is normally recited on holidays) nor with the customary blessings before and after that are only said on holidays.

==== Chardal ====
Chardal Jews usually refers to the portion of the Religious Zionist Jewish community in Israel which inclines significantly toward Charedi ideology (whether in terms of outlook on the secular world, or is their stringent (machmir) approach to Halacha); however, it is sometimes used to refer to the portion of the Charedi Jewish community in Israel which inclines significantly toward Religious Zionist (Dati-Leumi) ideology. Chardal is an initialism of the words Charedi and Dati-Leumi.

== Haredi newspapers in Israel ==
The main Haredi newspapers, Hamodia, HaMachane HaHaredi, and Yated Ne'eman, occasionally publish articles strongly criticizing Zionism, naming it a "heretical movement". They sometimes refer to the country as "Israel", and at other times will only refer to the geographical entity as "Eretz Yisroel". The Israel news columns are almost exclusively right of centre, lambasting Arab terrorism. Articles about outreach movements in Israel and Israeli culture are very common, and are shown without ideological bias. Hapeles, another Israeli Hareidi newspaper has campaigned extensively for Hareidim not to be drafted into the Israeli Defense Forces. When the offices were raided and computers confiscated in 2017 the newspaper claimed that the raid was political and intended as a reprisal for their anti-draft activities.

== Haredim outside of Israel ==
=== America ===
On June 9, 2013 a rally was held in Foley Square in Manhattan, NY to protest the conscription of Orthodox Jews into the Israeli Defense Forces. Between 20,000 and 30,000 Haredim attended. Among the speakers was Rabbi Elya Ber Wachtfogel, the rosh yeshiva of Yeshiva Gedolah Zichron Moshe in South Fallsburg, NY.

On June 11, 2017 a similar rally was held in Barclays Center in Brooklyn, NY. Close to 20,000 Haredim attended. The speakers included Rabbi Aaron Schechter, rosh yeshiva of Yeshivas Chaim Berlin, Rabbi Leibish Leiser of Pshevorsk, known as The Pshevorsker Rebbe, one of the most prominent leaders of the Haredi community of Antwerp, Belgium, and Rabbi Yaakov Shapiro, author of The Empty Wagon: Zionism’s Journey from Identity Crisis to Identity Theft. A letter was read from Rabbi Aharon Feldman, the rosh yeshiva of Yeshivas Ner Yisroel in Baltimore, MD, who wasn’t able to attend in person. Rabbi Schechter lambasted the attempt to draft Orthodox Jews as an assault on the essential characteristics of religious Jews.

=== Europe ===
On June 27, 2013 Haredim protested in front of the EU headquarters in Brussels, Belgium against Israel attempting to draft Orthodox yeshiva students. The protest was attended by Rabbi Ephraim Padwa, head of The Union of Orthodox Hebrew Congregations in London, Rabbi Elyakim Schlesinger, a prominent English rosh yeshiva and internationally recognized halachic authority, and Rabbi Leibish Leiser of Pshevorsk from Antwerp, Belgium.

== Haredi books about Zionism ==
Several books on the issue of Zionism were written by different rabbis.

=== Eim HaBanim Semeicha ===
Eim HaBanim Semeicha was written by Rabbi Yisachar Shlomo Teichtal, and published in 1943. Teichtal grew up as a staunch anti-Zionist Hasid of the Munkatsher Rebbe. However, during the Holocaust, Rabbi Teichtal changed his position from the one he espoused in his youth. The physical product of that introspection is the book, Eim HaBanim Semeicha, in which he specifically retracts his previous viewpoints, and argues that the true redemption can only come if the Jewish people unite and rebuild the land of Israel. Many of his co-religionists viewed the book with skepticism, some going so far as to ban Rabbi Teichtal from their synagogues.

In the book, Rabbi Teichtal strongly criticizes the Haredim for not supporting the Zionist movement. When it was written, it was a scathing criticism of the Jewish Orthodox establishment, and Agudat Israel in particular. He writes: "It is clear that he who prepares prior to the Sabbath will eat on the Sabbath (Avodah Zarah, 3a), and since the Haredim did not toil, they have absolutely no influence in the Land (of Israel). Those who toil and build have the influence, and they are the masters of the Land. It is, therefore, no wonder that they are in control... Now, what will the Haredim say? I do not know if they will ever be able to vindicate themselves before the heavenly court for not participating in the movement to rebuild the Land."

=== Sefer Vayoel Moshe ===
Vayoel Moshe was published by the Satmar Rebbe, Rabbi Joel Teitelbaum in 1961. It consists of three parts: Maamar Shalosh Shevuos (three oaths), Maamar Yishuv Eretz Yisroel (settling the Land of Israel), and Maamar Loshon HaKodesh (the holy language). The first part, discusses the three oaths mentioned in Ketubot 111a - that the Jewish people are not allowed to ascend to Eretz Yisrael by force, that the Jewish people are not allowed to rebel against the nations of the world, and that the Jewish people may not by their sins delay the coming of Moshiach, the Jewish messiah. It is primarily a book of Halacha (Jewish law). Rabbi Teitelbaum refers to Religious Zionism as a major desecration of God's name, blames Zionism for the Holocaust, and refers to Zionist leaders such as Theodor Herzl as "heretics".

=== Kuntres Al HaGeulah VeAl HaTemurah ===
Published in 1967 also by Rabbi Joel Teitelbaum, this small book consists of inspirational polemics against Zionism as a rebuttal to those who said that the Six-Day War was a divine miracle that showed God's support for the State of Israel. Teitelbaum wrote that he did not believe anything miraculous had occurred; small, but advanced, armies often defeat far larger ones. However, for those who insist that the Israeli victory was a supernatural event, it should be viewed as a test from God to see whether the Jewish people would follow the Torah or be led astray by miracles which seemed to support Zionism in the eyes of the masses. He compared this to the miracles that are often done by idolaters in support of their religions, inasmuch as Judaism is not based on miracles, but, rather, on the national revelation on Sinai.

=== Ikvesa D’Meshicha ===
Written by Rabbi Elchonon Bunim Wasserman, regarded as one of the closest students of Rabbi Yisroel Meir Kagan, better known as the Chofetz Chaim. He was a prominent rosh yeshiva and leader in Agudath Israel. It was first written in Yiddish and later translated by Rabbi Moshe Schoenfeld into Hebrew. It was printed most recently in Kovetz Mamarim v’Igeres, a collection of writings by Rabbi Wasserman on various topics published through Yeshiva Ohr Elchonon founded by Rabbi Simcha Wasserman, the author’s son. In the book he refers to the Zionist movement as Amalek: “Those who wage war against God, if they could they would fly to heaven to do it but since they can’t they have decided to fight against the Jewish People who are God’s servants and accept His kingship. Being so, their goal is not their own benefit, rather to spite God and disgrace His honor.” In the book Rabbi Wasserman details various facets of nationalism/Zionism that run counter to the fundamentals of Jewish Hashkafah (religious philosophy). Rabbi Shimon Schwab wrote Beis HaShoeivah Al Ikvesa D’Meshicha compiling and elucidating Rabbi Wasserman’s source material.

=== B’ayos Hazman ===
Written by Rabbi Refael Reuvain Grozovsky the rosh yeshiva of Yeshiva Kamenetz in Poland and later Mesivta Torah v’Daas in Brooklyn, NY as well as Yeshiva Bais Medarsh Elyon in Monsey, NY. He was the son-in-law of the venerated rabbinic leader Rabbi Boruch Ber Leibowitz and an active member of the Agudas Yisroel organization in Europe and America. The book addresses the permissibility of voting in Israeli elections which Agudas Yisroel in Israel had recently permitted. Rabbi Grozovsky writes that participation in the Israeli government is clearly a sin in Jewish law rather he questions if such a sin could be permitted in the face of the grave situation of Orthodox community living in Israel at the time and if the participation is used as a tool to combat the influence of Zionists. Throughout this discussion Rabbi Grozovsky writes adamantly that justifying the participation in Israeli elections is not to be taken as justifying the ideology of Zionism and that Orthodox Jews voting in such elections should only be viewed as a tactic to disempower the Zionists.

=== I Will Await Him ===
I Will Await Him, published in 2018 by Yirmiyahu Cohen, argues that the establishment of the State of Israel violates Halakhah, claims it is illegitimate, and calls on religious Jews to disassociate from it.

=== The Empty Wagon: Zionism’s Journey from Identity Crisis to Identity Theft ===
Published in 2018 by Rabbi Yaakov Shapiro. The book details the incongruence of Judaism and Zionism, particularly the ideology of Zionism rather than just the practical establishment of a state in Jewish law. It received approbations from Rabbi Yitzchok Tuvia Weiss and Rabbi Moshe Sternbuch; the leaders of the Edah HaChareidis in Jerusalem, and Rabbi Elya Ber Wachtfogel; rosh yeshiva of Yeshiva Gedolah Zichron Moshe in South Fallsburg, NY and a prominent Haredi leader in America.

== Involvement with the State of Israel ==
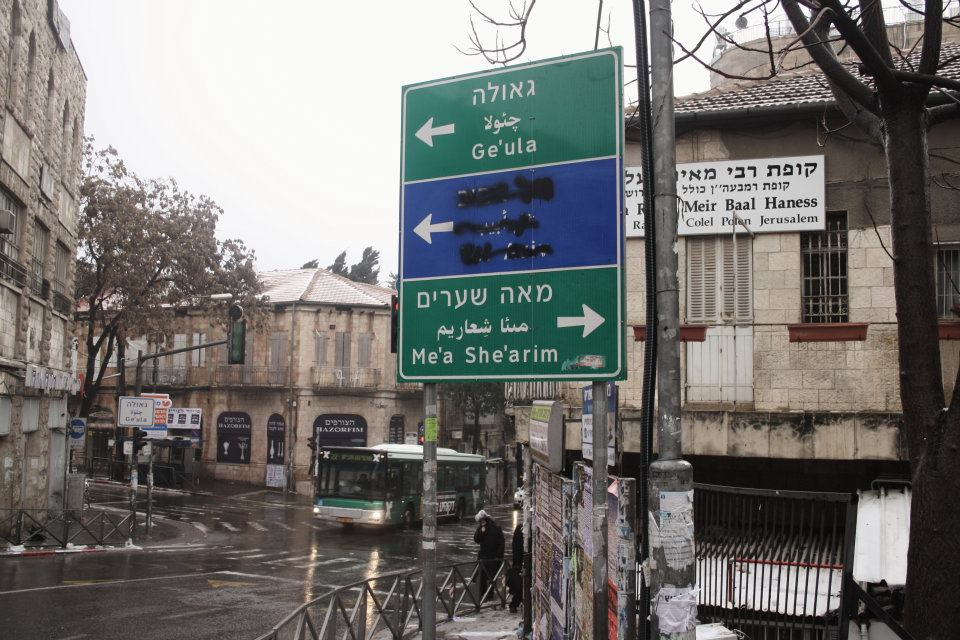
Tel Aviv, symbol of secularism, crossed out on this traffic sign in Jerusalem.

Among Haredi anti-Zionist movements, opinions differ on what attitude to take now that a state exists. Some movements remained actively anti-Zionist, while others lowered their voice; some refuse to vote, while others do vote; some accept money from the government, while others do not.

Many Hasidic Rebbes with followers in the land of Israel, including the Gerrer Rebbe, the Belzer Rebbe, the Lubavitcher Rebbe, and others, have encouraged their followers to vote in Israeli elections. Lubavitcher Hasidim are encouraged to join the Israeli Defense Forces, in order to ensure the state's security (inasmuch as the State's security is inextricably entwined with the safety of the Jewish people who live within its borders). Most other Haredi groups refuse to serve in the IDF under any circumstances including participating in National Service (Sherut L’umi).

Meanwhile, the Edah HaChareidis Rabbinical Council of Jerusalem and its associated communities, including Satmar, Dushinsky, Toldos Aharon, and Toldos Avrohom Yitzchok, do not vote, and do not accept government money. Around election days, posters by the Edah HaChareidis are posted throughout Haredi neighborhoods of Jerusalem, proclaiming that it is forbidden to vote in the elections, and that doing so is a grave sin. The Edah HaChareidis and its affiliated movements have permitted co-operating with the Israeli police under extenuating circumstances.

=== Work force and tax contribution ===
As of 2023-2024, Israel's ultra-Orthodox community made up 14% of the country's working-age population, but only generated 4% of the national tax revenue, so the result of an Israel Democracy Institute (IDI) study. As a result, the government lost billions of shekels and the average non-Haredi worker will have to pay an additional 3,540 shekels with their 2025 taxes in order to make up for the deficit. Just 54% of Haredi men were employed in 2024, and 81% of the women as of 2023. While Haredi households contribute less in income taxes, their community is consuming a higher rate of state services. It benefits from discounts on public transportation fares and municipal tax, and receives housing assistance. The IDI researcher found this situation to be unsustainable, with the conservative Kohelet Policy Forum also recently reporting that 80% of Haredi households are net receivers, collecting more government benefits than they are paying back in taxes.

== See also ==
- 2013 Haredi anti-draft protests in Israel
- Conservative Judaism and Zionism
- Humanistic Judaism and Zionism
- Protest against conscription of yeshiva students
- Non-Zionism
- Reconstructionist Judaism and Zionism
- Reform anti-Zionism
- Reform Zionism
- Secularism in Israel
