= Walther Eidlitz =

Austrian Indologist and historian (1892-1976)

Walther Eidlitz (1892 – 1976), also known as Vamandas (Vāmana dāsa) and Vimala-Krishna Vidyavinoda Dasa, was an Austrian writer, poet, Indologist and historian of religion.

== Biography ==
Eidlitz was born on 18 August 1892 in Vienna, Austria. He studied civil engineering before serving as a prisoner of war camp guard in the First World War, during which time he also began writing. He published poems from 1913, and released his first book in 1919. He won the Bauernfeld Prize for literature in 1920. After the war, Eidlitz worked as a freelance writer. It was around this time that he converted to Christianity, but was also was drawn to humanistic Zionism and aspects of anthroposophy. He regularly contributed to the newspaper Neue Freie Presse, and occasionally the Jewish magazine Menorah.

In 1923 He married Hella Spira, a former Zionist youth leader. Their son Günther was born in 1933. Through his wife's family, he was introduced to occultist Erna Benthien, who in 1930 led her followers out of the Anthroposophical Society after she had expressed Nazi sympathies. He continued to publish plays and novels until 1932. When the Austrian PEN Center spoke out against intellectual oppression in Nazi Germany in 1933, Eidlitz left the organization. He associated Hitler with the anthroposophical idea of the 'Christ-Impulse'. He documented his travels, including to Sweden, in Reise nach der vier Winde (1935), in which he described a Scandinavian master race. He made successful efforts, including manipulating birth registers, to be recognized as an 'honorary Aryan' despite being of Jewish descent.

In pursuance of his religious and philosophical interest he left his family in Austria in 1938 and traveled to India. He spent time in an internment camp in India during the Second World War, where he was converted to Hinduism by German bhakta Sadananda Das. Eidlitz was initiated into Gaudiya Vaishnavism by Swami Bhakti Hridaya Bon. His mother, Friederike Eidlitz, was deported to Theresienstadt in 1942 and died there in 1944.

He moved to Sweden in 1946. In 1975 he received an honorary doctoral degree from Lund University. He has written about his spiritual journey in his autobiography, but his main work is Kṛṣṇa-Caitanya, The Hidden Treasure of India: His Life and His Teachings. He died in Vaxholm.

== Publications ==
- (1917) Hölderlin: Szenen aus einem Schicksal (Hölderlin: Scenes from a Destiny). Berlin: Reiß.
- (1918) Der goldene Wind (The Golden Wind). Berlin: Reiß.
- (1919) Der junge Gina (The Young Gina). Berlin: Reiß.
- (1921) Die Herbstvögel (The Autumn Birds). Berlin: Rowohlt.
- (1922) Bettina. Berlin: Wir Verlag.
- (1923) Der Berg in der Wüste (The Mountain in the Desert). Wien: E. P. Tal & Co.
- (1924) Die Laufbahn der jungen Clothilde (The Career of the Young Clothilde). Wien: P. Zsolnay.
- (1926) Die Gewaltigen: Novellen aus drei Jahrtausenden (The Mighty Ones: Novellas from Three Millennia). Wien: P. Zsolnay.
- (1928) Kampf im Zwielicht: Eine Dichtung (Struggle in Twilight: A Poem). Wien: P. Zsolnay.
- (1930) Zodiak (Zodiac). Wien: P. Zsolnay.
- (1932) Das Licht der Welt (The Light of the World). Wien: Zsolnay.
- (1935) Reise nach den vier Winden: auf den Spuren der Weltgeschichte (Journey to the Four Winds: In the Footsteps of World History). Braunschweig: Wollermann.
  - Swedish translation: Vindrosen runt. Stockholm: Norstedt, 1935.
- (1937) Der Mantel der großen Mutter: Eine Wanderung durch die nordische Welt (The Mantle of the Great Mother: A Journey through the Nordic World). Braunschweig: Wollermann.
- (1948) Den glömda världen: en bok om det okända Indien (The Forgotten World: A Book about the Unknown India). Written in German but first released as a Swedish edition, translated by Karin Granstedt. Stockholm: Norstedt & söner. Revised as Den glömda världen: om hinduism och meditation, translated by Karin Granstedt and Sigvard Sjögren. Stockholm: Askild & Kärnekull, 1972. ISBN 91-7008-224-3.
  - German: Bhakta: Eine indische Odyssee. Hamburg: Claassen, 1951.
  - English translation: Unknown India: A Pilgrimage into a Forgotten World. London: Rider, 1952. Later retitled Journey to Unknown India. Mandala Publishing, 1998 and 2004. ISBN 1-886069-22-0.
  - Russian translation: Путешествие в неизвестную Индию (Journey to Unknown India). Moscow: Философская книга, 2001. ISBN 5-8205-0043-1.
- (1952) Indisk mystik (Indian Mysticism). Stockholm: Bonnier. (Studentföreningen Verdandis småskrifter; No. 526; 2nd ed., 1956). Translated to Swedish from the author's German manuscript.
- (1955) Die indische Gottes-Liebe (The Indian Love of God). Olten: Walter Verlag.
  - Swedish translation: Krishnas leende: En bok om indisk gudshängivenhet. Translated by Elin Lagerkvist and Günther Eidlitz. Stockholm: Natur & Kultur, 1955.
- (1957) Die unverhüllte Bhakti (The Unveiled Bhakti). Stockholm: Almqvist & Wiksell.
- (1957) Der Glaube und die heiligen Schriften der Inder (The Faith and the Sacred Scriptures of the Hindus). Olten: Walter Verlag.
- (1968) Kṛṣṇa-Caitanya: Sein Leben und Seine Lehre (Krishna-Caitanya: His Life and His Teaching). Stockholm: Almqvist & Wiksell.
  - Swedish translation of Part I: Guds lek: om indisk gudsuppenbarelse. Translated by Sigvard Sjögren; edited by Günther Eidlitz. Stockholm: Natur & Kultur, 1976. ISBN 91-27-00306-X.
  - Swedish translation: Krishna-Caitanya, Indiens dolda skatt, Hans liv och Hans lära. Stockholm University, 2014.
  - English translation: Krishna-Caitanya, His Life and His Teachings. Translated and annotated by Mario Windisch, Kid Samuelsson, Katrin Stamm and Bengt Lundborg. 2014. ISBN 978-91-981318-1-9.
- (1972) Livets mening och mål i indisk tankevärld (The Meaning and Goal of Life in Indian Thought). Written in German but first released as a Swedish edition, translated by Sigvard Sjögren. Stockholm: Aldus/Bonnier. ISBN 91-0-037942-5.
  - German: Der Sinn des Lebens: der indische Weg zur liebenden Hingabe. Olten: Walter Verlag, 1974. ISBN 3-530-18900-6.
  - English translation: The Meaning of Life in the Indian World of Thought. Revised English edition, 2008.
- (1976) Krishnas flöjt: dikter ur den indiska orduppenbarelsen (Krishna's Flute: Poems from the Indian Revelation of the Word). Poems selected and translated from Sanskrit by Walther Eidlitz. Stockholm: Tiden. ISBN 91-550-2093-3.
