= Gathering of Israel =

Aspect of Jewish eschatology

The Gathering of Israel (Hebrew: קִבּוּץ גָּלֻיּוֹת, Modern: Kibbutz Galuyot, Tiberian: Qibbuṣ Galuyoth, lit. 'Ingathering of the Exiles'), or the Ingathering of the Jewish diaspora, is the biblical promise of Deuteronomy 30:1–5, made by Moses to the Israelites prior to their entry into the Land of Israel.

During the days of the Babylonian captivity, writings by the Israelite prophets Isaiah and Ezekiel encouraged their people with the promise of a future gathering of the exiles to the Land of Israel. Since the destruction of the Second Temple in 70 AD, the continual hope for exiled Jews' return to the Land of Israel has served as a core theme of Judaism. Maimonides, a prominent medieval Jewish scholar, connected the materialization of this return with the coming of the Davidic Messiah.

This gathering of the Jewish diaspora became the foundation of the Zionist ideology and later the central theme of the Israeli Declaration of Independence. It defines aliyah, the act of diaspora Jews migrating to Israel, since Israel is considered to be spiritually higher for the Jewish people than any other of the world's lands. Since 1948, the mass migration of diaspora Jews to Israel has been likened to the Exodus from ancient Egypt, especially in the context of the Jewish exodus from Muslim-majority countries.

== Moses' promise ==
In the latter parts of the Book of Deuteronomy, when Moses' death was near, he prophesied about the destiny of the people of Israel. Their destiny would not be promising – curses would come upon them and they would go into exile – but when they return to their homeland later, their situation will be as good as it had been in the past, and so said Moses:

1. And it will be, when all these things come upon you the blessing and the curse which I have set before you that you will consider in your heart, among all the nations where the Lord your God has banished you,
2. and you will return to the Lord, your God, with all your heart and with all your soul, and you will listen to His voice according to all that I am commanding you this day you and your children,
3. then, the Lord, your God, will bring back your exiles, and He will have mercy upon you. He will once again gather you from all the nations, where the Lord, your God, had dispersed you.
4. Even if your exiles are at the end of the heavens, the Lord, your God, will gather you from there, and He will take you from there.
5. And the Lord, your God, will bring you to the land which your forefathers possessed, and you will take possession of it, and He will do good to you, and He will make you more numerous than your forefathers.

— Deuteronomy 30:1-5

== Prophets' promise ==
The Nevi'im (Prophets) prophesying after the destruction of the First Temple had encouraged the Babylonian exiles by reiterating the words of Moses.

In chapter 11 the Book of Isaiah says (the gathering here is mentioned as being done for the "second time". What this means remains cryptic:

11. And it shall come to pass that on that day, the Lord shall continue to apply His hand a second time to acquire the rest of His people, that will remain from Assyria and from Egypt and from Pathros and from Cush and from Elam and from Sumeria and from Hamath and from the islands of the sea.
12. And He shall raise a banner to the nations, and He shall gather the lost of Israel, and the scattered ones of Judah He shall gather from the four corners of the earth.

— Book of Isaiah 11:11-12

In chapter 29 the Book of Jeremiah says:

14. And I will be found by you, says the Lord, and I will return your captivity and gather you from all the nations and from all the places where I have driven you, says the Lord, and I will return you to the place whence I exiled you.

— Book of Jeremiah 29:14

In chapter 20 the Book of Ezekiel says:

41. With a pleasing savor I shall accept you when I take you out of the nations, and I shall gather you from the lands in which you were scattered, and I shall be hallowed through you before the eyes of the nations.
42. And you will know that I am the Lord when I bring you to the land of Israel, to the land that I lifted My hand to give to your forefathers.

— Book of Ezekiel 20:41-42

== Second Temple period ==
Several texts from the Second Temple period, originating in a Judean context, petition God to gather the exiles.

An example appears in the Book of Sirach, a wisdom book dating to the early 2nd century BCE:

Gather all the tribes of Jacob, and give them their inheritance, as at the beginning.

— Sirach 36:11 (RSV)

In the opening chapter of 2 Maccabees, likely composed in the second half of the 2nd century BCE, a prayer for the gathering of exiles is embedded in a letter from Judas Maccabeus and the Jews of Judea and Jerusalem to the Jews of Egypt, urging them to observe Hanukkah, the festival of the Temple's rededication:

Gather those together that are scattered from us, deliver them that serve among the heathen, look upon them that are despised and abhorred, and let the heathen know that thou art our God.

— 2 Maccabees 1:27 (KJV)

Another example can be found in the Psalms of Solomon, a group of psalms, or religious poems, dating from the 1st century BCE:

Gather together the dispersed of Israel, with mercy and goodness; For Thy faithfulness is with us.

— Psalms of Solomon 8:28 (translated by G. Buchanan Gray and R. H. Charles)

Two further examples appear in several Dead Sea scrolls from the sectarian community at Qumran (possibly Essenes): the daily Words of the Luminaries (4Q504–506) and the Festival Prayers (4Q507–509), though both are considered non-sectarian. According to Esther Glickler Chazon, all of these texts together suggest a shared liturgical tradition rooted in the Hebrew Bible. Its appearance in both daily and festival prayers, at Qumran and in rabbinic liturgy, points to a widespread practice that persisted through the Second Temple period before being formalized in rabbinic law.

== Maimonides ==
In Law of Kings, Maimonides writes:

1. The Messianic King will arise in the future and restore the Davidic Kingdom to its former state and original sovereignty. He will build the Temple and gather the dispersed of Israel. All the laws will be re-instituted in his days as they had been aforetimes; sacrifices will be offered, and the Sabbatical years and Jubilee years will be observed fully as ordained by the Torah.
2. Anyone who does not believe in him, or whoever does not look forward to his coming, denies not only the other prophets but also the Torah and of Moses our Teacher. For the Torah attested to him, as it is said:

"then, the Lord, your God, will bring back your exiles, and He will have mercy upon you. He will once again gather you from all the nations... Even if your exiles are at the end of the heavens, the Lord, your God, will gather you from there, and He will take you from there. And the Lord, your God, will bring you... (Deuteronomy 30:3-5).

These words, explicitly stated in the Torah, include all the statements made by all the prophets.

— Maimonides, Mishneh Torah, Law of Kings 11:1-2

== Other Jewish scholars ==
Other Jewish scholars view this differently from Maimonides. They argue that the Torah attested to a period, not a person, the period in which the People of Israel return to their homeland, the land of Israel. The act of ingathering of the exiles of Israel in the land of Israel, a Kibbutz Galuyot, will bring about the coming of the messiah, as the hand of God is in the events of the creation of the State of Israel, obviously a different reality than Maimonides depicts, though they see the writings of Maimonides as a way of learning the importance of the role of the messiah, since the Maimonides was a scholar not a prophet, and did not live up to see the event of the establishment of the State of Israel.

Zvi Yehuda Kook, one of the leaders of the Religious Zionist Movement, used to quote from the Responsa book, Yeshuot Malko, of Israel Yehosha of kutna, in conjunction with Aliyah (Yoreh De'ah 66): "There is no doubt that this is a greater Mitzvah (a commandment of the Torah), because the gathering is an Atchalta De'Geulah ('the beginning of the redemption'), as attested, "I will yet gather others to him, together with his gathered ones" (Isaiah, 56:8), and see Yebamoth, page 64, "the Divine Presence does not rest on less than two myriads of Israelites", especially nowadays in which we have seen the great desire inasmuch as in men of lesser importance, mediocre ones, and upright in heart, it is more than likely that we would gleam with the spirit of salvation, fortunate are the "ones who" take part in "bringing merit unto the masses"

Haredi Judaism and Chabad movement takes the writings of the Maimonides literally: The messiah is assigned the mission of completing the ingathering the exiles of Israel. Until then, the Jewish community living in Israel is defined as a Diaspora of Israel, though they give their consent to the Jewish rule of Israel, and see the advantages of it.

== Terms of Jewish nationality ==
1. Cyrus's Declaration (538 BC), Ezra 1:3

Who is among you of all His people, may his God be with him, and he may ascend [va'Yaal / Aliya] to Jerusalem, which is in Judea, and let him build the House of the Lord, God of Israel; He is the God Who is in Jerusalem.

According to the Bible, Cyrus the Great called upon the Jews to implement the ingathering of the exiles of Israel, a Kibbutz Galuyot, through his conquests, and not only to live there but also to rebuild the Temple in Jerusalem (Beit HaMikdash) that was destroyed.

2. Napoleon, in his Proclamation to the Jews of Asia and Africa (1799), called for the return of the Jewish people:

Bonaparte has published a proclamation in which he invites all the Jews of Asia and Africa to gather under his flag in order to re-establish the ancient Jerusalem. He has already given arms to a great number, and their battalions threaten Aleppo.

The French scholar Henry Laurens holds that the proclamation never took place and that the document supposedly proving its existence is a forgery.

3. Balfour Declaration:

A formal statement of policy by the British government stating:

"His Majesty's Government view with favour the establishment in Palestine of a national home for the Jewish people, and will use their best endeavours to facilitate the achievement of this object, it being clearly understood that nothing shall be done which may prejudice the civil and religious rights of existing non-Jewish communities in Palestine, or the rights and political status enjoyed by Jews in any other country."

== Zionism ==
The First Zionist Congress of the World Zionist Organization (WZO), assembled in Basel in August 1897 and adopted the Zionist platform, which came to be known as the Basel Program, which stipulated the following goal: "Zionism seeks to establish a homeland for the Jewish people in Eretz Israel secured by public law".

== Aliyah ==
Aliyah Bet was the code name given to illegal immigration by Jews to Mandatory Palestine between 1920 and 1948, in violation of the restrictions laid out in the British White Paper of 1939, which dramatically increased between 1939 and 1948. Aliyah Bet was organized by the Yishuv (the Jewish settlement in the Land of Israel before Israel's establishment as a country) from 1934 until the State of Israel began in 1948.

Aliyah Bet started modestly before World War II, increasing substantially after the Holocaust.

== The State of Israel ==
The idea of the ingathering of the exiles of Israel in the land of Israel (a Kibbutz Galuyot) was the basis for the establishment of the State of Israel, being mentioned in the Israeli Declaration of Independence. After the Holocaust, the United Nations General Assembly, in its decision-making process on United Nations Partition Plan for Palestine, perceived this idea to be the reason for adopting the decision on a Jewish State. Expressions of yearning for the gathering of the exiles of Israel in the land of Israel can be found in the Prayer for the State of Israel, which was authored by Israel's Chief Rabbis during the first years of Israel's existence. Israel's bodies of authorities have expressed their opinion on this matter by passing the Law of Return, which granted every Jew the right to make Aliyah to the land of Israel.

=== Prayer for the State of Israel ===
The Prayer for the Welfare of the State of Israel is recited on the Sabbath and Jewish holidays in many synagogues around the world. The prayer appeals to God to bless the land of Israel, to assist its leaders, and an appeal using the words of Moses:

Lead them, swiftly and upright, to Your city Zion and to Jerusalem, the abode of Your Name, as is written in the Torah of Your servant Moses: "Even if your outcasts are at the ends of the world, from there the Lord your God will gather you, from there He will fetch you. And the Lord your God will bring you to the land that your fathers possessed, and you shall possess it; and He will make you more prosperous and more numerous than your fathers.

The prayer is commonly recited in Religious Zionist and Conservative Judaism synagogues, but generally not in Haredi synagogues.

=== Law of Return ===
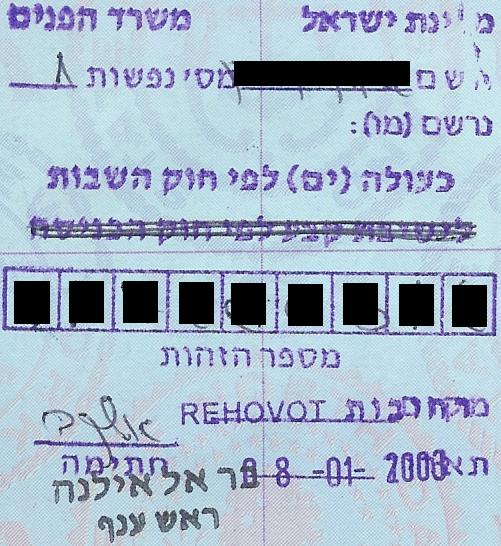
A stamp in a passport issuing the holder Israeli citizenship based on the Law of Return

The Law of Return (Hebrew: חוק השבות, Hok ha-shvut), a law passed in 1950 in memory of the Holocaust, allows every Jew the right to make Aliyah to the State of Israel and to receive a certificate of Aliyah, which grants the certificate holder Israeli Citizenship immediately. This stems from Israel's identity as the Jewish State, which is connected to the idea of the gathering of Israel.

=== Yom HaAliyah ===
Yom HaAliyah (Aliyah Day) (Hebrew: יום העלייה) is a new Israeli national holiday officially passed into law on June 21, 2016. Yom HaAliyah is to be celebrated annually on the tenth of the Hebrew month of Nisan (Hebrew: י׳ ניסן). The day was established to acknowledge Aliyah, immigration to the Jewish state, as a core value of the State of Israel, and honor the ongoing contributions of Olim to Israeli society.

== The Church of Jesus Christ of Latter-day Saints ==
Members of the Church of Jesus Christ of Latter-day Saints believe in the literal gathering of Israel: That all of the lost tribes will be returned and gathered together around the time of the second coming of Jesus Christ.

Members of the church receive patriarchal blessings in which their lineage is declared. They are declared as being a descendent (literal or adopted) of one of the twelve tribes of Israel. Many members of the church today are a part of the tribe of Ephraim, a fulfillment of prophecy that Ephraim would have the birthright and responsibility for helping to gather scattered Israel in the last days.

== See also ==
- Aliyah
- Atchalta De'Geulah
- Christian Zionism
- Expulsions and exoduses of Jews
- Geography of antisemitism
- History of ancient Israel and Judah
- History of antisemitism
- History of Israel
- History of the Jews and Judaism in the Land of Israel
- History of the Jews under Muslim rule
- History of Zionism
- Jewish diaspora
- Jewish exodus from the Muslim world
- Jewish history
- List of Jewish Immigrants to the Land of Israel
- Persecution of Jews
- Gathering (LDS Church)
- Operation Ezra and Nehemiah
- Operation Joshua
- Operation Magic Carpet (Yemen)
- Operation Moses
- Operation Solomon
- Operation Yachin
- Pre-Modern Aliyah
- Proto-Zionism
- Return to Zion
- Yom HaAliyah
