= Conservative Judaism and Zionism =

Conservative Judaism has historically been a movement that supports Zionism. Unlike Reform and Orthodox Judaism, Conservative Judaism does not and has never had a significant anti-Zionist faction. While some individual Conservative Jews hold anti-Zionist or non-Zionist views, those views are not endorsed by the Conservative movement.

== History ==
According to Elliot N. Dorff, the "Conservative movement is the only religious movement [of Judaism] which has always been Zionistic and has never had an anti-Zionist wing."

While regarding itself as the heir of Rabbi Zecharias Frankel's 19th-century positive-historical school in Europe, Conservative Judaism fully institutionalized only in the United States during the mid-20th century. According to Alan Silverstein, President of Mercaz Olami, Frankel's support of Hebrew as the language of Jewish prayer was a proto-Zionist commitment to "the national element in Jewish practices". Silverstein has written that Heinrich Graetz, an historian who is commonly viewed as a proto-Zionist, influenced and strengthened Frankel's belief in Jewish peoplehood.

According to Brandeis University professor Jonathan Sarna, "Zionism played an important role in the growth of Conservative Judaism" in the United States". He has written that "East European Jews were drawn to Zionism and to those Jewish religious movements that embraced it - Conservative Judaism chief among them."

Conservative Judaism as a separate movement developed from institutions such as the Jewish Theological Seminary of America (JTS) and the United Synagogue of America (now known as the United Synagogue of Conservative Judaism) during the 20th century. In the late 1800s and early 1900s, many Reform Jews were anti-Zionists and the Zionist movement was largely secular. Conservative Judaism embraced Zionism, despite the irreligious and sometimes anti-religious views of many Zionists. Many Conservative teachers were affiliated with the Zionist Organization of America (ZOA). According to Herbert Parzen, the Conservative rabbinate and their acolytes were a crucial factor in winning over the majority of American Jews to Zionism.

In 1957, Moshe Davis of JTS wrote a program for Conservative Judaism that elucidates the movement's support for Zionism. The program states that Judaism has an "eternal bond" with Eretz Yisrael and that the "emergence of the State of Israel marks one of the noblest achievements in modern Jewish history."

In the 2020s, a small number of Conservative Jews identify as anti-Zionists or non-Zionists, including some rabbis and rabbinical students. These views are more common among younger Conservative Jews. However, the Conservative movement is officially in favor of Zionism and does not endorse these anti-Zionist views. Some Conservative synagogues and institutions will not hire anti-Zionist clergy or faculty, viewing anti-Zionism as incompatible with Conservative Judaism.

== See also ==
- Haredim and Zionism
- Humanistic Judaism and Zionism
- Jewish anti-Zionism
- Mercaz USA
- Reconstructionist Judaism and Zionism
- Reform anti-Zionism
- Reform Zionism
- Shaul Magid
