= Prayer for the Welfare of the State of Israel =

Modern Jewish prayer

The "Prayer for the Welfare of the State of Israel" (Hebrew: תפילה לשלום המדינה, lit. 'prayer for the peace of the state') is a Jewish prayer that accompanies Shabbat and Jewish holidays. It requests God to bless and protect Israel, provide the country's leaders with truth and guidance, fulfill the prophetic ingathering of the exiles, and hasten the coming of the Messiah. The prayer is recited at synagogue in Israel and among the Jewish diaspora and is rooted in traditional liturgy that features in parts of the Hebrew Bible, wherein the Israelites are instructed to seek divine providence for the welfare and stability of the cities that they are living in. Due to the fact that it focuses on the modern country, the prayer is widely regarded with political significance and may be excluded from religious service among some Jewish denominations, particularly those that are anti-Zionist or highly orthodox.

Upon the Israeli Declaration of Independence in May 1948, the prayer was authored by Yitzhak HaLevi Herzog, who served as the first Chief Rabbi of Israel. Following revisionary work by Israeli novelist and poet Shmuel Yosef Agnon, it was published in Haaretz and quickly became an important part of Jewish liturgy in Israel and eventually in other parts of the world. It has been described as a "religious Declaration of Independence for the State of Israel" by the Israeli historian Yoel Rappel.

== Background ==
Since as early as the 6th century BCE, Jews have prayed for the welfare of the sovereign and government of the country or state where they lived. The first instance of Jews being instructed to pray for their government is from the biblical prophet Jeremiah in Jeremiah 29:4-7, and it is also mentioned in Pirkei Avot in the Mishnah.

== History ==
Israel declared its independence on 14 May 1948, or 5 Iyar 5708 on the Hebrew calendar. Rabbi Yitzhak HaLevi Herzog, the first Ashkenazi Chief Rabbi of Israel and the grandfather of Israeli President Isaac Herzog, authored a prayer in tribute to the newly founded state. Rabbi Herzog's friend, the Nobel laureate S. Y. Agnon, then edited the work. The prayer was initially published in Haaretz on September 20, 1948. After its composition, the Chief Rabbinate of Israel approved the prayer's inclusion into the Jewish prayer service.

After the Six-Day War in 1967, Israel became an integral part of the organized American Jewish community and the Jewish diaspora. This was reflected by greater incorporation of Israel into the prayer service of the major American Jewish denominations in the form of a prayer for the welfare of Israel.

American cantor Sol Zim composed a commonly used rendition of the prayer in 1988, which was popularized as a tribute to fallen soldiers of the Israel Defense Forces by chief cantor Shai Abramson.

=== Authorship debate ===
Immediately after the prayer's publication, there was debate over whether Herzog or Agnon was the true author. Herzog was generally considered the author until a 1983 article in Ma'ariv by scholar David Tamar raised the possibility of Agnon's authorship. However, findings by scholar Yoel Rappel and corroborated by the National Library of Israel in 2018 confirmed Herzog's authorship.

== Content ==
Theme	English translation	Hebrew
Bless the State of Israel	Our father in Heaven, rock and redeemer of Israel, bless the State of Israel, the initial flowering of our redemption.	אָבִינוּ שֶׁבַּשָּׁמַיִם, צוּר יִשְׂרָאֵל וְגוֹאֲלוֹ, בָּרֵךְ אֶת מְדִינַת יִשְׂרָאֵל, רֵאשִׁית צְמִיחַת גְּאֻלָּתֵנוּ.
Provide her leaders with good counsel	Shield her beneath the wings of your lovingkindness; spread over her the shelter of your peace; send your light and your truth to its leaders, officers, and counselors, and correct them with your good counsel.	הָגֵן עָלֶיהָ בְּאֶבְרַת חַסְדֶּךָ, וּפְרֹשׁ עָלֶיהָ סֻכַּת שְׁלוֹמֶךָ, וּשְׁלַח אוֹרְךָ וַאֲמִתְּךָ לְרָאשֶׁיהָ, שָׂרֶיהָ וְיוֹעֲצֶיהָ, וְתַקְּנֵם בְּעֵצָה טוֹבָה מִלְּפָנֶיךָ.
Protect her defenders	Strengthen the defenders of our Holy Land; grant them, our G-d, salvation, and crown them with victory, give the land peace, and everlasting joy for her inhabitants.	חַזֵּק אֶת יְדֵי מְגִנֵּי אֶרֶץ קׇדְשֵׁנוּ, וְהַנְחִילֵם אֱלֹקֵֶינוּ יְשׁוּעָה וַעֲטֶרֶת נִצָּחוֹן תְּעַטְּרֵם, וְנָתַתָּ שָׁלוֹם בָּאָרֶץ, וְשִׂמְחַת עוֹלָם לְיוֹשְׁבֶיהָ.
Gather to her all the exiles as you promised	Remember our brethren, the whole house of Israel, in all the lands of their dispersion, and bring them speedily to Zion, your city, and to Jerusalem, where your name lives, as it is written in the Torah of your servant Moses (Deuteronomy 30:4–6): "Even if you are dispersed in the uttermost parts of the world, from there HaShem, your G-d, will gather and fetch you, and HaShem, your G-d will bring you to the land which your ancestors possessed, and you shall possess her; and HaShem will make you more prosperous and numerous than your ancestors. (Then HaShem your G-d will open your and your children's hearts, to love HaShem your G-d with all your heart and soul, so that you may live.)"	וְאֶת אַחֵינוּ כָּל בֵּית יִשְׂרָאֵל, פְּקׇד נָא בְּכָל אַרְצוֹת פְּזוּרֵיהֶם, וְתוֹלִיכֵם מְהֵרָה קוֹמְמִיּוּת לְצִיּוֹן עִירֶךָ וְלִירוּשָׁלַיִם מִשְׁכַּן שְׁמֶךָ, כַּכָּתוּב בְּתוֹרַת מֹשֶׁה עַבְדֶּךָ (דברים ל,ד-ו): "אִם יִהְיֶה נִדַּחֲךָ בִּקְצֵה הַשָּׁמָיִם, מִשָּׁם יְקַבֶּצְךָ יְיָ אֱלֹקֶיךָ וּמִשָּׁם יִקָּחֶךָ. וֶהֱבִיאֲךָ יְיָ אֱלֹקֶיךָ אֶל הָאָרֶץ אֲשֶׁר יָרְשׁוּ אֲבֹתֶיךָ וִירִשְׁתָּהּ, וְהֵיטִבְךָ וְהִרְבְּךָ מֵאֲבֹתֶיךָ. (וּמָל יְיָ אֱלֹקֶיךָ אֶת לְבָבְךָ וְאֶת לְבַב זַרְעֶךָ, לְאַהֲבָה אֶת יְיָ אֱלֹקֶיךָ בְּכׇל לְבָבְךָ וּבְכׇל נַפְשְׁךָ, לְמַעַן חַיֶּיךָ.)"
So that the whole world will recognize you as God	Unite our hearts to love and revere your name, and to observe all the precepts of your Torah, and speedily send us your righteous messiah of the House of David, to redeem those waiting for your salvation. Shine forth with the glory and pride of your strength over all the inhabitants of your world, and let everything that breathes proclaim: "HaShem, G-d of Israel is King; whose majesty reigns over all!" Amen Selah.	וְיַחֵד לְבָבֵנוּ לְאַהֲבָה וּלְיִרְאָה אֶת שְׁמֶךָ, וְלִשְׁמֹר אֶת כׇּל דִּבְרֵי תּוֹרָתֶךָ, וּשְׁלַח לָנוּ מְהֵרָה בֶּן דָּוִד מְשִׁיחַ צִדְקֶךָ, לִפְדּוֹת מְחַכֵּי קֵץ יְשׁוּעָתֶךָ. הוֹפַע בַּהֲדַר גְּאוֹן עֻזֶּךָ עַל כׇּל יוֹשְׁבֵי תֵּבֵל אַרְצֶךָ, וְיֹאמַר כֹּל אֲשֶׁר נְשָׁמָה בְּאַפּוֹ: "יְיָ אֱלֹקֵי יִשְׂרָאֵל מֶלֶךְ, וּמַלְכוּתוֹ בַּכֹּל מָשָׁלָה!" אָמֵן סֶלָה.

The prayer calls for Jews in the diaspora to return to Israel and commemorates Israel's founding as the beginning of the redemption. The Prayer for the State of Israel has a tune which is often used, and some synagogues sing a different, festive tune on holidays. The congregation stands while the leader reads the prayer, and in some synagogues everyone reads it aloud.

In the prayer, the State of Israel is called "the beginning of the emergence of our redemption". This phrase, and reservations about the secular governance of Israel, are among the reasons that mainstream Haredi Jews do not say this prayer. In practice, the recitation of this prayer, and to a lesser extent the Prayer for the Welfare of the Soldiers of the IDF, has become one of the differences delineating the Haredim from the Religious Zionists.

Cantorial historian Jeremiah Lockwood described the prayer as having "the stylistic feel of musical theater". The prayer is highly sentimental and divided into sections that build in dramatic tension. It is both an appeal to the emotions and a nationalistic Zionist piece. Lockwood writes that Zim's full-length soloist composition is rare among pulpit cantors due to reduced interest by attendees in hearing lengthy cantorial recitatives during services.

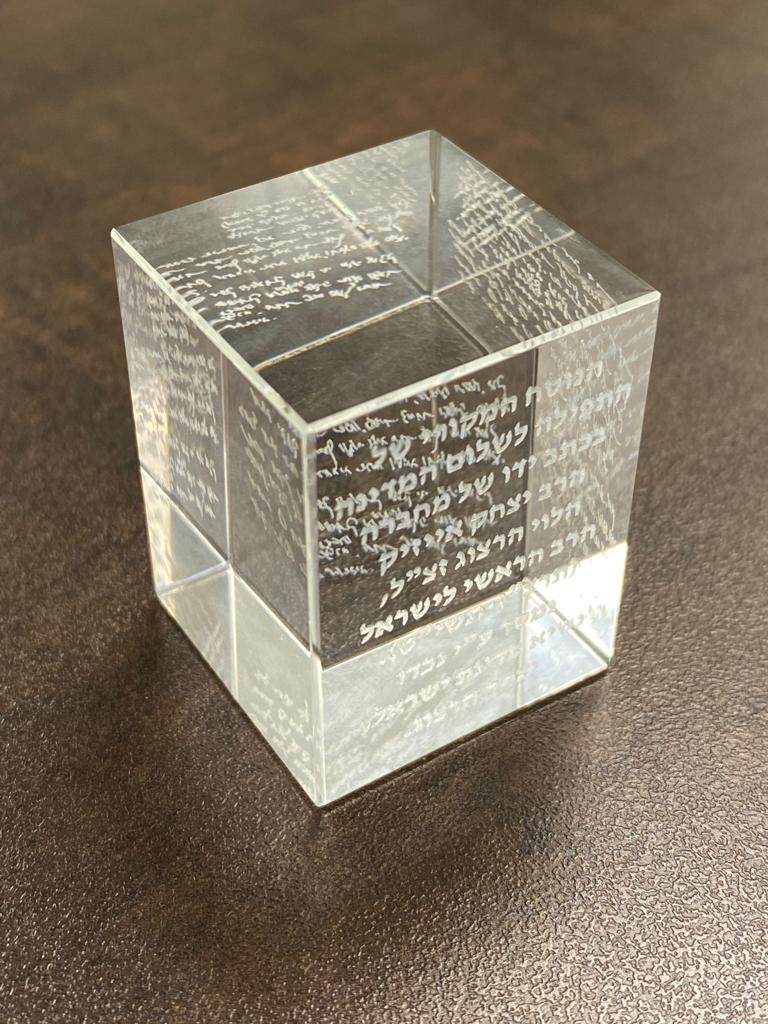
Gift of Isaac Herzog, President of Israel, presented to Israeli astronaut Eytan Stibbe, with the Prayer for the Welfare of the State of Israel engraved

== Liturgy ==
Major American Jewish denominations include the Prayer for the State of Israel in their most recent prayer books. The official siddur of the Union for Reform Judaism, Sha'arei Tefillah, first published in 1975, included the prayer for the State of Israel as part of its weekly and holiday services. The 2007 Reform siddur Mishkan T'filah includes the prayer for the State of Israel. In 1985, the United Synagogue of Conservative Judaism's Siddur Sim Shalom included the prayer as part of its prayer service. In addition, the Rabbinical Council of America, representing Modern Orthodoxy, includes references to the state of Israel.

Ashkenazi Jews, both in Israel and the Jewish diaspora, recite the prayer on Shabbat and on Jewish holidays. Ashkenazi Jews recite the prayer between the recitation of the haftarah and the returning of the Torah scroll(s) to the Holy Ark.

Sephardi and Mizrahi Jews, however, usually recite it at the time when the Torah scroll(s) are taken out of the Ark. At these respective points, it was common practice throughout the years to add various blessings, including the Blessing for the Ruler of the Country. After the establishment of Israel, some synagogues also read a prayer for the welfare of the President of Israel, but this practice has virtually ceased today.

In the diaspora, it is said after the prayer for the respective national government.

== Legacy ==
Other prayers for the state of Israel have been composed, including by Isser Yehuda Unterman, Israel Brodie, Moshe Greenberg, and Simchah Roth, but Herzog's remains the most popular and widely published in Jewish prayer books. Sephardic Jews recite a similar prayer before the Kol Nidre service on Yom Kippur.

The prayer immediately became an important part of Jewish and Israeli liturgy. According to Rappel of Boston University's Elie Wiesel Center for Judaic Studies, the Prayer for the State of Israel is more important than the Israeli Declaration of Independence for many people, especially religious Jews. Rappel has called the prayer a "religious Declaration of Independence for the State of Israel".

Due to the prayer's political significance, it has been affected by politics. At times when there have been ill relations between the Religious Zionist community and the government of Israel, such as during the Israeli disengagement from Gaza in 2005 and during the period between the signing of the Oslo Accords until the assassination of Yitzhak Rabin, some refrained from reciting this prayer, or inserted changes which expressed their outrage at the State's leadership. One of the most common changes was to replace the words "...and send Your Light and Your Truth to its leaders, its officers and advisers, and set them aright with Your good counsel" with "stand at its head men of valor, God-fearers, men of truth who hate avarice, and send Your Light and Your Truth upon them."

== See also ==
- Conservative Judaism and Zionism
- List of Jewish prayers and blessings
