= Sol Zim =

American cantor (born 1939)

- Born: Solomon Zimelman; August 17, 1939 (age 86)
- Occupation: cantor
- Website: www.solzim.com

Sol Zim (born Solomon Zimelman on August 17, 1939) is an American cantor. He lives in Queens, New York.

Sol Zim is known for his classic Jewish songs. He has been featured in The New York Times, Daily News, The Chicago Tribune and newspapers from Brazil, South Africa and the United Kingdom.

== Notable works ==
In 1960, he performed with the Jewish Minister Cantor Association at Madison Square Garden. In the late 1970s, many religious rock operas were produced including Zim's David Superstar which borrowed from Jesus Christ Superstar. Released in 1974, Zim was inspired to write it after attending a Kiss concert with his sons. It was performed one night at the Hollis Hills Jewish Center in 1974 and was a minor hit. He also was part of a Jewish group that performed in front of the Pope John Paul II, being the first time in history that such a large group of Jewish clergy men officially met with a Pope.

Zim composed the commonly used rendition of the Prayer for the Welfare of the State of Israel in 1988, which was popularized by chief cantor of the Israel Defense Forces Shai Abramson as a tribute to fallen soldiers.

Sol Zim is Professor of Jewish Music in New York at the Academy for Jewish Religion. He has been featured on books about Jewish music like "And You Shall Know Us By The Trail Of Our Vinyl". He has also written books on Jewish music.

In 1992, the Academy for Jewish Religion of New York added a Cantorial Program directed by Kenneth Cohen, which was further developed by Sol Zim and Ram’n Tasat.

== Education ==
Sol Zim graduated at the Jewish Theological Seminary Cantorial Institute, and he was awarded an honorary Doctor of Music. Zim studied with other musicians as Kurt Baum, Julius Rudel, Samuel Weisser, and others.

== Family ==
Sol Zim is the descendant of five generations of cantors. Zim's father, Samuel Zimelman, served as cantor of the Hochschule Synagogue in Łomazy, Poland, and Congregation Shaarey Tphiloh in Portland, Maine. Zim's brother, Paul Zim, has served as cantor for B'nai Jeshurun in Manhattan. Zim's other brother, Sidney Zim, was the rabbi at Flatbush Jewish Center in Brooklyn.

== Awards ==
- "Hazzan Max Wohlberg Award" for Composition, from The Cantors Assembly.
- "The Yuval Award" for his contribution to Synagogue Music, from The Cantors Assembly.
- The Jewish Music Leadership Award, for his advancement of Jewish Music throughout the world, from The Academy for Jewish Religion.
- The Amit Humanities Award, in recognition of his achievements in preserving the Jewish Heritage for future generations through his musical work.
- Honorary fellow of the Cantors Institute of the Jewish Theological Seminary.

== Discography ==
- Shabbat Rock: An Original Friday Evening Rock (1974)
- Joy of Shabbos: A Family Singalong (1978)
- Chanukah: A Children's Sing Along (1979)
- Family Celebration (1986)
- Live in Concert (1991)
- Passover Seder: A Passover Sing-Along (1997)
- The Joy of Israel: Jewish-Israeli Ballads
- The Joy Of Cantorial Prayer (2000)
- Cantor Sol Zim Sings Avinu Shebashamayim: A Prayer for the State of Israel, and Much More (2013).
- Jewish Memories of Papa
- Greatest Yiddish Memories
- The Joy Of Israel: Jewish-Israeli Ballads
- America's Best Loved Jewish Singer Sings
- Sings Jewish Memories
