= Krishna-Chaitanya, His Life and His Teachings =

Life and Teachings of Chaitanya Mahaprabhu

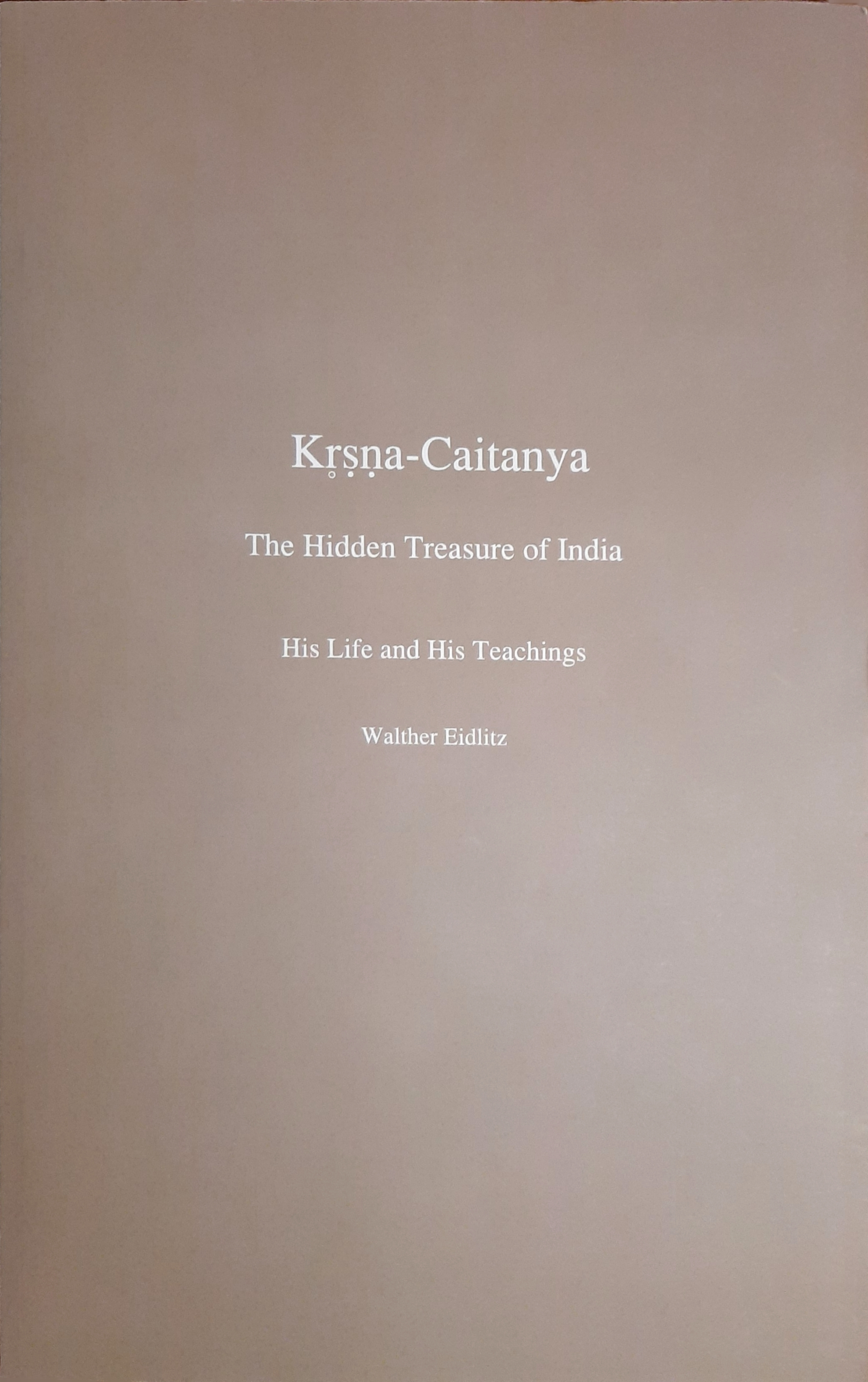
Krishna-Caitanya, the Hidden Treasure of India, His Life and His Teachings, 2014.

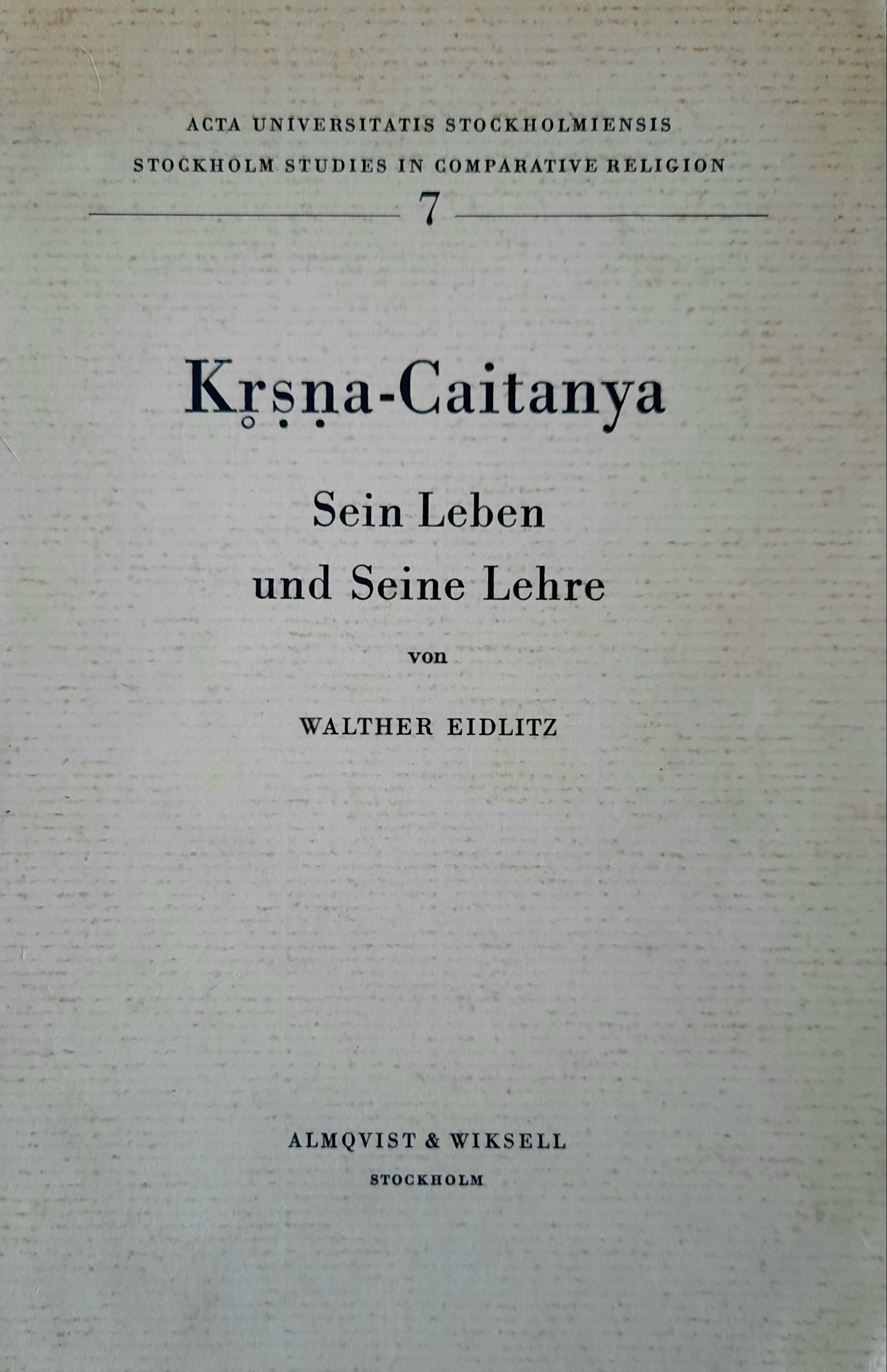
Krsna-Caitanya, Sein Leben und Seine Lehre. University of Stockholm, 1968

Kṛṣṇa-Caitanya, The Hidden Treasure of India: His Life and His Teachings (originally in German Kṛṣṇa-Caitanya, Sein Leben und Seine Lehre) is the main work of the Austrian scientist and guru of Gaudiya Vaishnavism Walther Eidlitz (1892-1976).

The book consists of two parts, the first part being an introduction to a biography of Krishna Chaitanya Mahaprabhu (1486-1534). It is the first book on Chaitanya in German, the first complete exposition of Chaitanya's life and teachings in a European language, and so far (2022) remains the only university-commissioned translation of Chaitanya's biography.

== Writing ==
The author himself believed that the book was started as soon as he arrived in India in 1938 and the whole work on it took 30 years.

In 1946 Sadananda writes to Vamandas (Walther Eidlitz): "I think it is time for us to make a beautiful book about the Lord of love [Chaitanya] and visit the lila-bhumi [lila places] of the Lord. But know that the reality there is much worse than the ideas we perceive from books." After being released from the camp Vamandas was forced to leave India. He settles in Sweden, starts preaching bhakti on the radio, gives lectures, organizes summer bhakti courses, writes and publishes his first books on bhakti.

"He [Sadananda] wanted to stay in the background and let Vamandas meet the public. Vamandas wrote books, gave lectures in Sweden, Germany and Switzerland and had summer courses in Sweden. Sadananda himself mainly focussed on his translations and dictating them to his disciples and friends."

In 1961 Sadananda had to return to Europe for health reasons. After recovering from the operation he immediately begins to help Vamandas with the work on a book about Chaitanya. So, in 1962 he writes to one of his friends: "I dictated to Vamandas all the material needed for a book about Chaitanya. Now he has everything to finish the book before Christmas."

Though the first Vamandas’ book on bhakti "Love of God" (1955) frustrated Sadananda tremendously, making him write several hundred pages of corrections to it, since it abounded in fundamental philosophical errors, "Krishna-Caitanya" was thoroughly rechecked by him and only stylistic moments gave rise to cause for complaint.

== English translation ==
The English translation was made by a group of Sadananda's students and their friends, viz. Mario Windish (Mandali Bhadra Das) - a former translator of A.C. Bhaktivedanta Swami's texts into German, Kid Samuelsson and Bengt Lundborg - the translators of "Krishna-Caitanya" into Swedish, and Katrin Stamm - an Indologist at the University of Flensburg and the manager of the archive of Sadananda's work and the spiritual works by Walther Eidlitz . Here is what the translators themselves have to say about the new edition of "Krishna-Caitanya":

“It is a revised edition of Vamandas’ book, which includes later corrections by the author and some additional explanations and translations from the original sources, provided by his guru, Svami Sadananda Dasa. When we came across passages, we thought needed clarification, we made annotations in square brackets or added a translators’ note."

== Reviews ==
After the release of the first edition prof. Ernst Benz (1907-1978) from the University of Marburg (Germany) wrote to Walther Eidlitz about his book "Krishna-Caitanya":

“I can only congratulate you sincerely that you have managed to combine the results of your rich studies in India and your insights into the sources – that are hardly or not at all available in Europe – into such a well fashioned overview. Moreover, I consider it a very significant achievement, that for the first time, as far as my modest knowledge of the matter is concerned, a realistic account of the historical personality of Chaitanya is presented. Especially in the Indian history of ideas most often the great personalities are completely covered by myths. No less rewarding is your successful translation of the teachings of Chaitanya into a form that is accessible to our German language and concepts of philosophy of religion.” [English translation]

Prof. Jan Gonda (1905-1991), the famous Indologist from the University of Utrecht (Netherlands), named "Krishna-Caitanya" a "very valuable work". Prof. Mircea Eliade (1907-1986) the historian of religion, writer and philosopher from the University of Chicago (USA), suggested to assist to publish the English translation of "Krishna-Caitanya". The Swedish academic, humanist and philosopher Alf Ahlberg (1892-1979) wrote in his review about "Krishna-Caitanya":

“Of course, only professional linguists can have a well-founded opinion about the quality of translations, and these translations have received the highest praise from them, also the work itself has been described as one of the most remarkable works on the history of religions published in our country in the last twenty years. The layman reader has the definite impression that in these translations and in the other parts of the book the scientist and the poet have entered into a happy union… The author is not an unknown man. He has previously published a number of fascinating books, both about his personal experiences in India and about Hinduism in Swedish. Unfortunately, they are all sold out, although they are in high demand. But the work now mentioned is his magnum opus. It is the fruit of thirty years of research, nine of which were spent in India, where Eidlitz studied from native teachers, associated in close friendship with prominent representatives of the devotional tradition, to which Chaitanya belongs, and even during his long stay in our country was in constant contact with them.” [English translation]

Not only Indologists but also other followers of Gaudiya Vaishnavism warmly welcomed the book of Vamandas. The famous guru and preacher of Gaudiya Vaishnavism in the West A.C. Bhaktivedanta Swami (1896-1977) spoke highly of Walther Eidlitz's book and called it authoritative:

“You know that I have got already one German God-brother [Sadananda], and he has influenced another German scholar, Vamana dasa [Walther Eidlitz], who has written a very nice book on Lord Chaitanya, in German.”

In his review of the English edition of Krishna-Chaitanya, a Gaudiya Vaishnavism researcher and student of A.C. Bhaktivedanta Swami Steven J. Rosen (born 1955) writes:

“I remember reading, years ago, how the original German edition was used as a text at universities throughout Europe, and I noticed that it was quoted in numerous books by eminent scholars from around the world. Indeed, it was one of the first and only books on Sri Chaitanya in a European language at the time, making Mahaprabhu and His teachings available to the Western world in both academic language and through the lens of a believing Vaishnava… So, it should be clear that Prabhupada [Bhaktivedanta Svami] thought fondly of both teacher and student, Sadananda and Eidlitz, and had even specifically praised Eidlitz’s work on Sri Chaitanya. As a disciple of Srila Prabhupada, I can think of no better endorsement.”
