= Beit Kaplan =

Reconstructionist Jewish organization

Beit Kaplan: The Rabbinic Partnership for Jewish Peoplehood
- Region served: United States
- Website: www.beitkaplan.org

Beit Kaplan: The Rabbinic Partnership for Jewish Peoplehood is a Reconstructionist Jewish rabbinical organization founded in April 2016. The organization promotes what it describes as traditional interpretations of Reconstructionist Judaism, emphasizing Zionism, the centrality of Jewish peoplehood.

== History ==
Beit Kaplan was established in response to debates within Reconstructionist Judaism. Early initiatives included opposition to the Boycott, Divestment and Sanctions (BDS) movement and to the Reconstructionist Rabbinical College (RRC) decision to admit rabbinical students with non-Jewish partners. The group advocated for a return to Reconstructionism’s original orientation toward rational religious naturalism, in contrast to what it described as "New Age religiosity" and "soft spirituality".

Beit Kaplan affirms values such as Ahavat Yisrael (“love for the Jewish people”) and support for the State of Israel. Its stated aim is to promote a “more traditional Kaplanian reading of Reconstructionist Judaism” and to continue the work of Rabbi Mordecai Kaplan, the movement’s founder, who was a Zionist. Opposition to rabbis in interfaith relationships is no longer a part of Beit Kaplan's objectives nor are rabbis who are in or supportive of interfaith relationships barred from membership in the organization.

After the October 7, 2023 attacks against Israel by Hamas, Beit Kaplan has added the goal of countering anti-Zionism at the Reconstructionist Rabbinical College and within the Reconstructionist Rabbinical Association (RRA). Membership grew to 101 rabbis and rabbinical students across six countries as of September 2025. Growth had accelerated in May 2024 following the publication of accounts by two Zionist former RRC students who documented hostility toward Zionism within the college.

Although Beit Kaplan operates as an independent rabbinical association, many of its members also belong to the RRA. The organization maintains that it seeks a course correction within Reconstructionist Judaism, emphasizing support for Israel and Jewish peoplehood. It has issued public statements rejecting efforts to delegitimize Israel.

The umbrella body Reconstructing Judaism officially supports the Zionist movement and has not endorsed BDS, though many RRC graduates are involved in anti-Zionist groups such as Jewish Voice for Peace. Reconstructing Judaism has acknowledged the formation of Beit Kaplan and maintains that it does not represent a schism within the Reconstructionist movement.

== See also ==
- Reconstructionist Judaism and Zionism
- Mordecai Kaplan
