= Reform anti-Zionism =

Anti-Zionism within Reform Judaism

Reform anti-Zionism is anti-Zionism within Reform Judaism. Throughout the 1800s and until the mid-1900s, the Reform movement was primarily anti-Zionist. The American Reform Movement's 1885 Pittsburgh Platform endorsed anti-Zionism, as did the Union Prayer Book, the movement's 1892 siddur (prayer book). In response to a nascent Zionist movement and the persecution of Jews by Nazi Germany, the Columbus Platform of US Reform Judaism repudiated the movement's previous anti-Zionism, although the movement retained its earlier anti-Zionist siddur until it was replaced by Gates of Prayer in 1975. Subsequent American Reform platforms and siddurim have continued to embrace Zionism, such as the Mishkan T'filah and the 1997 Miami Platform, which clarified and reinforced the movement's support for Zionism. While the global Reform movement as a whole is officially Zionist, and American Reform rabbinical students are required to spend at least a year in Israel, some adherents of Classical Reform Judaism continue to maintain anti-Zionism, such as the American Council for Judaism (ACJ).

== History ==
=== 19th century ===
In 1857, the American Reform rabbi Isaac Mayer Wise wrote the siddur Minhag America, which introduced some anti-Zionist reforms, such as adding more English text in addition to Hebrew and eliminating calls for a return to the Land of Israel, the rebuilding of the Temple in Jerusalem, the reinstitution of ritual sacrifice, and the restoration of the Temple priesthood and the Davidic line.

The US Reform movement's first official platform, the Pittsburgh Platform, which was adopted in 1885, officially endorsed anti-Zionism. The platform stated that "We recognize, in the modern era of universal culture of heart and intellect, the approaching of the realization of Israel's great Messianic hope for the establishment of the kingdom of truth, justice, and peace among all men. We consider ourselves no longer a nation, but a religious community, and therefore expect neither a return to Palestine, nor a sacrificial worship under the sons of Aaron, nor the restoration of any of the laws concerning the Jewish state."

Following Theodor Herzl's First Zionist Congress in 1897, the US Reform movement adopted an anti-Zionist statement at the movement's 1898 biennial meeting.

=== 20th century ===
In 1937, the US Reform movement adopted the Columbus Platform, which endorsed Zionism and repudiated the movement's earlier anti-Zionism as codified in the Pittsburgh Platform. The Columbus Platform states that "In the rehabilitation of Palestine, the land hallowed by memories and hopes, we behold the promise of renewed life for many of our brethren. We affirm the obligation of all Jewry to aid in its upbuilding as a Jewish homeland by endeavoring to make it not only a haven of refuge for the oppressed but also a center of Jewish culture and spiritual life." However, the movement continued to use the anti-Zionist Union Prayer Book. Even after 1937, many Reform Jews and Reform rabbis remained ambivalent towards or opposed to Zionism.

The American Council for Judaism (ACJ) was founded in 1942. ACJ promoted Classical Reform Judaism and anti-Zionism. The organization was founded following a Zionist resolution by the Central Conference of American Rabbis (CCAR) at an annual conference held in Cleveland, Ohio. The resolution was a repudiation of an early 1935 CCAR resolution that expressed neutrality towards Zionism.

In 1957, the Union of American Hebrew Congregations (now the Union for Reform Judaism) issued a resolution disavowing the American Council for Judaism, alleging that the ACJ had "slandered" the UAHC, "wantonly impugned the national loyalties" of Zionist Reform Jews, and misrepresented the tenets of Classical Reform Judaism.

In 1967, a committee of the Central Conference of American Rabbis issued a report recommending that rabbinical students of the Hebrew Union College – Jewish Institute of Religion (HUC-JIR) be required to spend a year of study in Israel. The Reform movement was the first Jewish movement in the United States to require seminary students to study abroad in Israel. The recommendation was meant to strengthen Reform Judaism's connection to Zionism, at a time when many progressive young Jews were attracted to the New Left and anti-Zionism and felt disillusioned with Israel.

Due to an increase in Zionism within the US Reform movement in the wake of the Six-Day War, Gates of Prayer was adopted as a new siddur in 1975, replacing the anti-Zionist Union Prayer Book. Gates of Prayer included more Hebrew and prayers related to Israeli Independence Day.

=== 21st century ===
An organization of Reform and Conservative rabbis called the Zionist Rabbinic Coalition was formed in 2022. The stated goal of the group was to counter a perceived increase of anti-Zionism among Conservative and Reform Jews.

In 2023, the Zionist Reform rabbi Ammiel Hirsch, senior rabbi at the Stephen Wise Free Synagogue, delivered a sermon denouncing an alleged increase of anti-Zionism within Reform Judaism.

== Notable Reform anti-Zionists ==
- Elmer Berger - rabbi and founder of American Jewish Alternatives to Zionism
- Morris Lazaron - rabbi and member of American Friends of the Middle East
- Philip Magnus - rabbi and co-founder of the anti-Zionist League of British Jews
- Sigmund Maybaum - anti-Zionist German Reform rabbi
- Steven Schwarzschild - rabbi and philosopher
- Pauline Perlmutter Steinem - suffragrist and grandmother of Gloria Steinem
- Arthur Hays Sulzberger - publisher of The New York Times
- Heinemann Vogelstein - leading Reform rabbi in Germany

== See also ==
- Conservative Judaism and Zionism
- Humanistic Judaism and Zionism
- Jews Against Zionism
- Prayer for the Welfare of the State of Israel
- Reconstructionist Judaism and Zionism
- Reform Zionism
- The American Israelite
