= Reform Zionism =

Zionist ideology

Reform Zionism, also known as Progressive Zionism, is the ideology of the Zionist arm of the Reform or Progressive branch of Judaism. The Association of Reform Zionists of America is the American Reform movement's Zionist organization. Their mission “endeavors to make Israel fundamental to the sacred lives and Jewish identity of Reform Jews. As a Zionist organization, the association champions activities that further enhance Israel as a pluralistic, just and democratic Jewish state.” In Israel, Reform Zionism is associated with the Israel Movement for Progressive Judaism.

== History ==
We reaffirm that the object of Judaism is not political nor national, but spiritual, and addresses itself to the continuous growth of peace, justice and love in the human race.

— Central Conference of American Rabbis Resolution, 1897

Historically, Zionism was a secular ideology that was opposed by Orthodox, Conservative and Reform Jews. While Orthodox and Conservative groups opposed Zionism for being nationalist rather than religious, Reform Judaism opposed a return to Zion for theological reasons. Reform theology conceived of Judaism as the universal religion of the prophets. In 1845, Samuel Hirsch, David Einhorn and Samuel Holdheim passed a resolution at the Frankfurt Conference that removed references to Palestine and a "Jewish State" from prayers on the grounds that nationalism and statehood were not compatible with Reform theology. Similar resolutions in 1869, 1885 and 1897 rejected the idea of "restoration of the Jewish State". As early as 1890 the Central Conference of American Rabbis had publicly opposed Zionist ideology.

In the early 20th century, many Jewish leaders accepted the ideal of Americanization, which was an undivided political, economic and cultural affiliation with America. Underlying the anti-Zionist views of many American Reform rabbis was their acceptance of Americanization. Zionism was, to them, an ideology of foreign origins that was associated with newly arrived Jewish immigrants from Eastern Europe. Isaac M. Wise said the Zionist movement in America was sponsored by refugees who had been persecuted in Europe. These views were echoed in Jewish newspapers like The American Israelite.

The Pittsburgh Platform of 1885 rejected Jewish nationalism: "We consider ourselves no longer a nation but a religious community, and therefore expect neither a return to Palestine,...nor the restoration of any laws concerning a Jewish state". This position did not change until the Columbus Platform of 1937 which affirmed the "obligation of all Jewry" to build a "Jewish homeland" in Palestine and to make it "not only a haven of refuge for the oppressed but also a center of Jewish culture and spiritual life". In the San Francisco Centenary Perspective of 1976 the State of Israel is described as the land to which Reform Jews have "innumerable religious and ethnic ties".

However, with the establishment of the State of Israel, many Progressive/Reform Jews saw a need for a Jewish national home in the Biblical Land of Israel. In 1978, the Association of Reform Zionists of America began working to conceptualize a Zionism that took the universalistic ideals of Reform Judaism, as well as the particular needs of all Jewish people, into account. In 1997, the association solidified thinking regarding the acceptability of Zionism within the Reform Movement through the acceptance of the Miami Platform of the Central Conference of American Rabbis.

The Miami Platform makes the distinction between Medinat Yisrael and Eretz Yisrael. The platform says, in part,

During two millennia of dispersion and persecution, Am Yisrael [people of Israel] never abandoned hope for the rebirth of a national home in Eretz Yisrael. The Shoah [Holocaust] intensified our resolve to affirm life and pursue the Zionist dream of a return to Eretz Yisrael. Even as we mourned for the loss of one-third of our people, we witnessed the miraculous rebirth of Medinat Yisrael, the Jewish people's supreme creation in our age.

Centuries of Jewish persecution, culminating in the Shoah, demonstrated the risks of powerlessness. We, therefore, affirm Am Yisrael's reassertion of national sovereignty, but we urge that it be used to create the kind of society in which full civil, human, and religious rights exist for all its citizens. Ultimately, Medinat Yisrael will be judged not on its military might but on its character.

While we view Eretz Yisrael as sacred, the sanctity of Jewish life takes precedence over the sanctity of Jewish land.

Through the ideal of Tikkun Olam (healing the world), Reform Zionism sees the role of the State of Israel as the means by which the messianic era can be achieved, by acting as a "light unto the nations", a national example of ideal prophetic principles of justice and peace. For the Reform Zionist, this means that by working to make Israel a better place, one can lead the world in working towards a state of perfection.

Due to this, the Reform Zionist movement is heavily involved in social activism in Israel. As a religious, rather than political, ideology, Reform Zionism and its organizations do not see themselves as inherently political, and do not align with any Israeli political party or movement.

=== Hebrew Union College ===
In 1897, Hebrew Union College President and founder Isaac M. Wise described Judaism as "eternal" and "not tied down to a piece of land here or there". In 1903, Kaufmann Kohler replaced Wise as President of Hebrew Union College. Kohler believed that American Judaism "stands for American thought and American spirit, and not for Zionistic Neo-Hebraism or the language of the Jewish ghetto". The College adopted the position that "America is our Zion". Between 1905 and 1907, several faculty members resigned. Louis Lipsky said he was forced to resign over his support for Zionism. In 1907, three pro-Zionist instructors resigned their positions: Henry Malter, Max L. Margolis and Max Schloessinger. Both Malter and Schloessinger had published papers that were critical of Reform theology's rejection of Zionism. Schloessinger was particularly influenced by Ahad Ha'am. Zionists accused the College of forcing the men out because of their views. Margolis said that Kohler had told him that a Zionist could not be trusted to teach biblical exegesis. Public perception, including among the students of the College, was that Margolis was a victim of bigoted prejudice against Zionism. The Jewish Exponent wrote that a Zionist professor could not be allowed to turn the universal teachings of Judaism into "crude and nationalistic utterances". In 1920 after the San Remo Declaration on Palestine the College reaffirmed their anti-Zionist views in a statement: "We declare that no one land, Palestine or any other, can be called 'the national home of the Jews'".

=== The Union of American Hebrew Congregations ===
The Union of American Hebrew Congregations was founded in 1873 by Isaac M. Wise. In 1898, it adopted a resolution opposing Zionism which said: "The Jews are not a nation, but a religious community". They called Zion a "holy memory" but mainted that "America is our Zion". They said the mission of Judaism was spiritual, rather than political. This position was reaffirmed in 1919: "We, therefore, do not seek Israel for any national homeland, it being our conviction that Israel is at home in every free country and should be at home in all lands".

Union member Isaac Wolfe Bernheim was opposed to political Zionism supported the establishment of the Reform Church of American Israelites made up of "100 percent Americans" so that the "voice of the real American Israel may be heard". Bernheim and publications like The American Hebrew suggested replacing the term "Jewish" to avoid association with Zionist ideology, which they feared could create doubts about their loyalty to America. These proposals were unpopular and unsuccessful.

== Youth ==
The Reform Zionist movement has an international youth wing, represented by its youth movement, Netzer Olami, which includes branches in many countries across the world. NFTY, the Union for Reform Judaism's youth movement, is also declaredly Zionist.

== Affiliated communities in Israel ==
There are two Reform Zionist Kibbutzim in Israel, Kibbutz Yahel and Kibbutz Lotan in the Arava. There is a Reform Zionist agricultural community in the north called Har Halutz.

== German Reform Judaism ==
The Union of Progressive Jews in Germany, the primary Reform organization in Germany, officially endorses Zionism as one of its 35 principles, stating that the movement is committed to the State of Israel and to the goals enshrined in the Israeli Declaration of Independence.

== See also ==
- Arzenu
- Association of Reform Zionists of America
- Conservative Judaism and Zionism
- Haredim and Zionism
- Humanistic Judaism and Zionism
- Israel Movement for Progressive Judaism
- World Union for Progressive Judaism
- Netzer Olami
- Reform anti-Zionism
- Reconstructionist Judaism and Zionism
