= Yoel Rappel =

Israeli historian

- יואל רפל
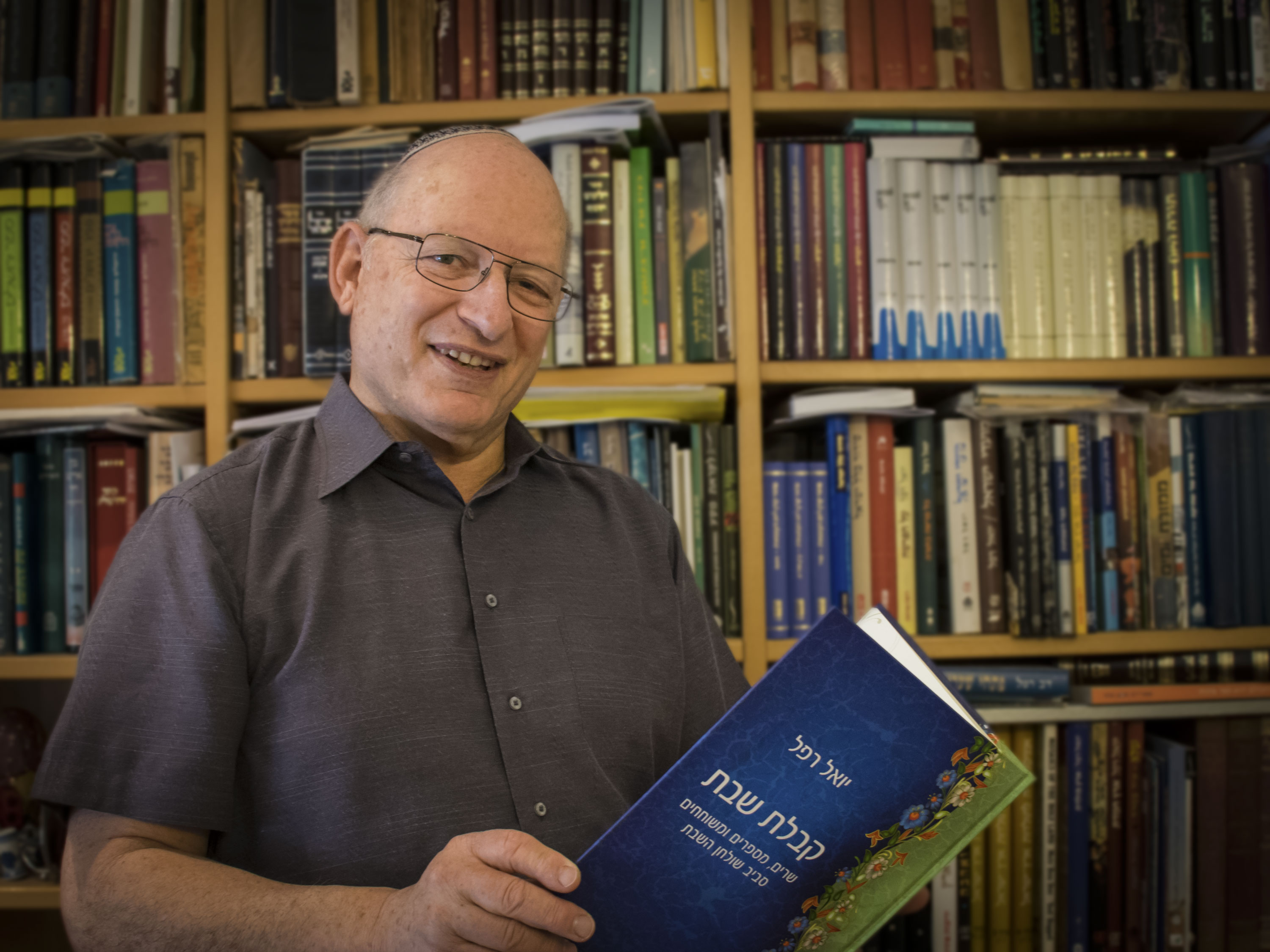
- Born: Yoel Rappel
- Education: Boston University, Ph.D.
- Occupation: Historian

Yoel Rappel (Hebrew: יואל רפל) also known as Joel Rappel, is an Israeli historian who specializes in the study of Jewish history and the evolution of Jewish prayer.

== Early life ==
Rappel is the son of Israeli historian Dov Rappel and grew up on Kibbutz Yavneh.

== Academic career ==
Rappel received his Ph.D. in Jewish history and rabbinic literature from Boston University. In addition to teaching at Boston University, Rappel has taught at Bet Berl College and the Avshalom Institute for Israel Studies. He has published 29 books and edited 80 academic articles. As a fellow at the Elie Wiesel Center for Jewish Studies at Boston University, Rappel specializes in the study of Jewish history and the evolution of Jewish prayer. He previously worked for 40 years as a journalist and senior program editor at the Israel Broadcasting Authority.

In 2018, Rappel's research confirmed that Rabbi Yitzhak HaLevi Herzog, the first Ashkenazi Chief Rabbi of Israel and the grandfather of Israeli President Isaac Herzog, wrote the Prayer for the Welfare of the State of Israel, settling a decades-long academic dispute over the prayer's authorship. Rappel's findings were corroborated by the National Library of Israel.

=== Elie Wiesel research ===
In 2009, Boston University professor Elie Wiesel, arguably the most famous Holocaust survivor, asked Rappel to organize and manage his archive, which contained approximately one million documents. Over 7 years, Rappel curated the archive. Rappel was also the Hebrew editor for Wiesel's books.

Rappel discovered a never-published Yiddish-language version of Night, Wiesel's famous memoir about his experiences during the Holocaust. The archived version included harsh criticisms of Jews who were too optimistic about the future, Jewish leaders who did not speak up, and Wiesel's Hungarian neighbors who "joyously watched the Jews" being deported. These were not included in the originally published 1960 version.
