= Reconstructionist Judaism and Zionism =

The relationship between Reconstructionist Judaism and Zionism dates to the founding of the Reconstructionist movement by Mordecai Kaplan. Kaplan was a strong supporter of the Zionist movement and thus the Reconstructionist movement has historically supported Zionism. All rabbinical students of the Reconstructionist Rabbinical College are required to spend a summer studying in Israel.

In recent years, due to the political liberalism of the Reconstructionist movement, some individuals affiliated or formerly affiliated with the movement have begun to become more critical of Zionism. Unlike Orthodox and Reform Judaism, the Reconstructionist movement has never historically had a significant anti-Zionist faction. According to Reconstructionist rabbi David Teutsch, the movement has displayed a "striking uniformity" of loyalty to Zionist principles throughout its history.

== History ==
Reconstructionist Judaism developed between the 1920s and 1940s, officially branching off from the Conservative movement in 1955. Israel has been a central issue of importance to Reconstructionist thought ever since the publication of Kaplan's 1934 work Judaism as a Civilization. Kaplan's conception of Zionism as a movement to rebuild a contemporary Jewish civilization in Land of Israel was distinct from the more common conception of Zionism as a movement to create a Jewish nation state. Reconstructionist rabbis Rebecca Alpert and Jacob Staub have emphasized that the Reconstructionist belief in the "civilizational character of Judaism predictably has led us to Zionist conclusions".

A "Zionist to his core", Kaplan's support for a Jewish state in the Land of Israel was based around promoting Jewish peoplehood, and his Zionism was not necessarily nationalist or religious in nature. Citing the prophet Isaiah's proclamation that "from Zion shall go forth Torah", Kaplan believed that the return of a "reconstructed" Torah to a secular Jewish state in Israel was of supreme importance to Reconstructionist Judaism.

According to Reconstructionist rabbi Amy Klein, the movement does not believe that the Land of Israel was the Promised Land for the Jewish people.

In 1967, Rabbi Kaplan called for a "spiritual Zionism" rather than a political Zionism.

In 2014, the Reconstructionist rabbi Brant Rosen resigned from his position at the Jewish Reconstructionist Congregation (JRC) in Evanston, Illinois, citing criticism of his pro-Palestinian activism. Rosen went on to found the independent anti-Zionist congregation Tzedek Chicago.

In 2022, Rebecca Alpert delivered a talk titled "Reconstructionism Without Zionism." A supporter of pro-Palestinian activism, Alpert described herself as a "Zionist who is working for the Zion that Kaplan envisioned", but acknowledged that in the current political climate she would be considered an anti-Zionist. In the same year, a series of conversations sponsored by five Reconstructionist synagogues was held called "Expanding the Reconstructionist Conversation on Israel/Palestine". The series highlighted criticism of the Israeli government for its "oppression of the Palestinian people" and included both Jewish and Palestinian speakers. Zoom events were held by all three of Canada's Reconstructionist synagogues (Or Haneshamah in Ottawa, Congregation Darchei Noam of Toronto, and Congregation Dorshei Emet of Hampstead, Quebec) as well as by two in the United States, Mishkan Shalom of Philadelphia and Gates of Heaven Synagogue in Madison, Wisconsin.

At the 2023 World Zionist Congress, the Reconstructionist movement endorsed the passage of several successful resolutions that supported the recognition of non-Orthodox conversions in Israel, supported LGBT inclusion, and opposed altering the Israeli Law of Return law.

During the mid-2020s, the Reconstructionist movement retains its support for Zionism, but a significant number of Reconstructionist Jews and rabbis have played visible roles in anti-Zionist and pro-Palestinian activism. Tensions over Israel and interfaith marriage lead to the forming of Beit Kaplan, a group of "Classical Kaplanian" Reconstructionist rabbis who support Zionism and oppose interfaith marriages among rabbis. Deborah Waxman, the leader of Reconstructing Judaism, has responded to controversy over Israel by reiterating that the Reconstructionist movement supports progressive Zionism, the existence of the State of Israel, and the two-state solution. However, Waxman stated that Zionism would not be a "litmus test" for Reconstructionist students and rabbis and has encouraged dialogue with anti-Zionist Reconstructionist rabbis involved in anti-Zionist organizations such as Jewish Voice for Peace (JVP). JVP's Rabbinical Council has a large number of Reconstructionist rabbis.

== See also ==
- Anti-Zionism
- Beit Kaplan
- Conservative Judaism and Zionism
- Haredim and Zionism
- Humanistic Judaism and Zionism
- Reform anti-Zionism
- Reform Zionism
