= Congregation Etz Hayim at Hollis Hills Bayside =

Jewish synagogue in Queens, New York

- Logo of the Hollis Hills Jewish Center

- Location in Queens, New York City

Religion
- Affiliation: Conservative Judaism
- Ecclesiastical or organizational status: Synagogue
- Leadership: Rabbi David Wise; Rabbi Gary Greene; Cantor Sol Zim
- Status: Active

Location
- Location: 210-10 Union Turnpike, Hollis Hills, Queens, New York City, New York 11364
- Country: United States
- Interactive map of Congregation Etz Hayim at Hollis Hills Bayside
- Coordinates: 40°43′59″N 73°45′37″W

Architecture
- Established: 1938 (as a congregation)
- Groundbreaking: May 15, 1949
- Completed: 1960
- Direction of façade: West

Website
- www.etzhayimhhb.org

Congregation Etz Hayim at Hollis Hills Bayside is an egalitarian Conservative synagogue located in the neighborhood of Hollis Hills in Queens, New York City, New York, United States. The congregation was formed through a May 2021 consolidation of the Hollis Hills Bayside Jewish Center and the Marathon Jewish Community Center.

As of 2016, 240 families were members of the synagogue. The synagogue today reflects a consolidation of the Hollis Hills Jewish Center, the Bayside Jewish Center Jewish Center of Oak Hills, and Marathon Jewish Community Center.

== History ==
=== Hollis Hills Jewish Center ===
Construction of the present building, originally named Hollis Hills Jewish Center, began on May 15, 1949. The cornerstone was laid on December 18, 1949.

Hollis Hills Jewish Center was built in three stages. First, the basement was built on the 211th Street side of Union Turnpike. The original sanctuary was in this structure. During the second phase, in the 1950s, a new sanctuary was built above the original sanctuary. Finally, the current sanctuary was built on the 210th Street side. This sanctuary was dedicated in 1960. The original two sanctuaries faced east. The current sanctuary faces west.

When Hollis Hills Jewish Center opened, it had 500 families as members.

In 2023, the congregation was one of eleven Jewish organizations to receive funding through the United States' Department of Homeland Security Nonprofit Security Grant Program that enhances the safety and security of Jewish schools and places of worship to guard against threats and attacks.

=== Bayside Jewish Center ===
Bayside Jewish Center was created in 1938 when two groups of Jewish families who held services in two locations — one above a store on Bell Boulevard and the other in a store on 32nd Avenue — joined, bought land, and erected a building on it on 35th Avenue between 206th Street and 207th Street. In 1958, the property was condemned to make way for the Clearview Expressway. The next building cornerstone was quarried from Mount of Olives in Jerusalem and was laid in 1959. The dedication took place on October 6, 1960. The building was sold in 2016 as part of the consolidation process. Both congregations have had many members who were Holocaust survivors; in some cases both spouses are survivors. One of the Bayside members was on Schindler's List.

== Clergy and staff ==
Hollis Hills Jewish Center's first rabbi was Naphtali Z. Frishberg. Frishberg had formerly been a rabbi at Temple Beth El in Springfield, Massachusetts; and he served at Hollis Hills until 1955, when he became the rabbi of Beth Emeth Synagogue in Larchmont. Rabbi Max L. Forman succeeded Frishberg. Frishberg died at the age of 51 in 1960.

Hollis Hills Jewish Center's first cantor was Sol J. Sanders. Born in Poland, Sanders immigrated to the United States in 1921; and served in the United States Army in the South Pacific during World War II. He subsequently graduated from Hebrew Union College's School of Sacred Music in 1952. Sanders served as cantor of Hollis Hills Jewish Center from 1952 to 1962, when he left to serve at Congregation Shearith Israel in Dallas. He was replaced by Cantor Joseph Weiss, formerly of Prestwich Hebrew Congregation in Manchester, England who served until 1964 when the current cantor, Sol Zim was appointed.

Reverend Frank E. Strassfeld served Hollis Hills Jewish Center for 49 years, in roles such as Shammes and Director of Religious Activities and Daily Services. Born in Poland on December 26, 1922, Rev. Strassfeld immigrated to the United States in 1935. During World War II, Rev. Strassfeld served in the United States Army Air Corps. Strassfeld died in November 1998. The main sanctuary is dedicated as Reverend Frank E. Strassfeld Sanctuary, and the block of Union Turnpike directly in front of the building was named Reverend Frank Strassfeld Turnpike in 2000.

As of 2015, Hollis Hills Jewish Center's clergy are Rabbi David Wise and Cantor Sol Zim. Zim has served since 1964. H. Joseph Simckes is Rabbi Emeritus.

In 1952, Dr. William A Orentlicher was engaged as Rabbi of the Bayside Jewish Center. He remained with until his retirement fifty years later. Rabbi Moses Kirsh joined as Rabbi of Bayside Jewish Center on November 1, 2007, and he remained as Rabbi until shortly before the consolidation.
