= Mercaz USA =

Mercaz - The Movement to Reaffirm Conservative Zionism Inc
- Formation: 1978; 48 years ago
- Tax ID no.: 52-1171542
- Legal status: 501(c)(3) nonprofit organization
- Headquarters: New York City
- Coordinates: 40.7536450°N 73.9919341°W
- President: Marilyn Wind
- Executive Director: Sarrae G. Crane
- Revenue: $361,046 (2015)
- Expenses: $368,629 (2015)
- Staff: 1 (2014)
- Volunteers: 2 (2014)
- Website: www.mercazusa.com

Mercaz USA, officially Mercaz - The Movement to Reaffirm Conservative Zionism Inc, is a 501(c)(3) nonprofit organization focused on Zionism and Conservative Judaism, headquartered in New York City.

== Mission ==
The mission of Mercaz USA is to further the principles of the Jerusalem program to affirm the goals of Zionism and provide a vehicle through which Conservative Jews can express their commitment to Zionism.

== Program services ==
Mercaz USA publishes educational programs about Hebrew and Zionism for use with high school students and adults. Mercaz USA advocates for religious pluralism, funding for Conservative Judaism, and Israel's right to security and peace. Mercaz USA encourages people to travel and make aliyah to Israel.

Members of Mercaz USA are eligible to elect other members to the World Zionist Congress. Mercaz USA, Association of Reform Zionists of America, and Religious Zionists of America comprise the three largest contingents of the American delegation to the World Zionist Congress.

== History ==
Mercaz USA was founded in 1978 and incorporated in Washington, D.C., on June 4, 1979.

In 1998, the Israel Policy Forum asked American Jewish groups to sign a letter encouraging President Bill Clinton to continue his current policy toward the State of Israel and the Palestinian National Authority. Mercaz USA chose not to endorse the letter, saying, "It is not a reflection of the contents of the letter one way or another. It was not a letter coming out of the American Zionist Movement or the Presidents Conference, the two organizations to which Mercaz belongs."

In 1999, the Knesset passed legislature stating that individuals may sit on local religious councils only if they vow allegiance to the Chief Rabbinate of Israel. In a letter to Prime Minister Benjamin Netanyahu, Mercaz USA wrote that the legislature was a "deliberate slap in the face of the majority of world Jewry who are not affiliated with Orthodoxy. ... We are deeply concerned that Israel's image as a democratic country may be undermined by this bill."
