= Humanistic Judaism and Zionism =

The relationship between Humanistic Judaism and Zionism dates to the founding of Humanistic Judaism in the 1960s. Rabbi Sherwin Wine, a founder of the movement, was a supporter of the Zionist movement and believed in Jewish peoplehood. Believing that Jewishness is a peoplehood and not only a religion, Wine wrote that "Zionism is the most effective expression, in modern times, that we Jews are more than a religion. We are a people and an ethnic culture." The Society for Humanistic Judaism supports Zionism and the State of Israel, but acknowledges a broad spectrum of opinion about Israel and Zionism, stating that Humanistic Jewish opinion ranges from "ardent Zionist to anti-Zionist". The International Institute for Secular Humanistic Judaism is also supportive of Zionism and the State of Israel. Because Humanistic Judaism is secular, Humanistic Zionism is rooted in cultural and ethnic bonds to the Land of Israel rather than rooted in theological beliefs.

== History ==
The Society for Humanistic Judaism (SHJ) has issued several resolutions supportive of Zionism and the State of Israel. The SHJ's General Statement on Israel credits the establishment of the State of Israel as one of the most important modern Jewish accomplishments, approvingly nothing that most of the early Zionists were secular Jews. The resolution states that secular Zionists, such as Max Nordau and Ahad Ha'am, have been important influences on the development of Humanistic Judaism.

On May 4, 2002, during the Second Intifada, the SHJ reaffirmed its commitment to Zionism and Israel through a resolution stating that "We reaffirm our solidarity and support of the people of Israel and of the right and responsibility of Israel to defend its citizens. The State of Israel is under attack. We reaffirm our support for the continued existence and defense of Israel. The future of the State of Israel must be secured. We support Israel, the United States, and others in their efforts to combat terrorism." The statement also endorsed the two-state solution, including a "demilitarized sovereign Palestinian state" alongside the State of Israel.

On May 4, 2014, the SHJ issued a resolution condemning the American Studies Association for endorsing the BDS movement's academic boycott of Israel. The resolution characterized the academic boycott as harmful to academic freedom and discriminatory.

== See also ==
- Conservative Judaism and Zionism
- Haredim and Zionism
- Reconstructionist Judaism and Zionism
- Reform anti-Zionism
- Reform Zionism
