= Eim HaBanim Semeicha =

1943 book by Yisachar Shlomo Teichtal

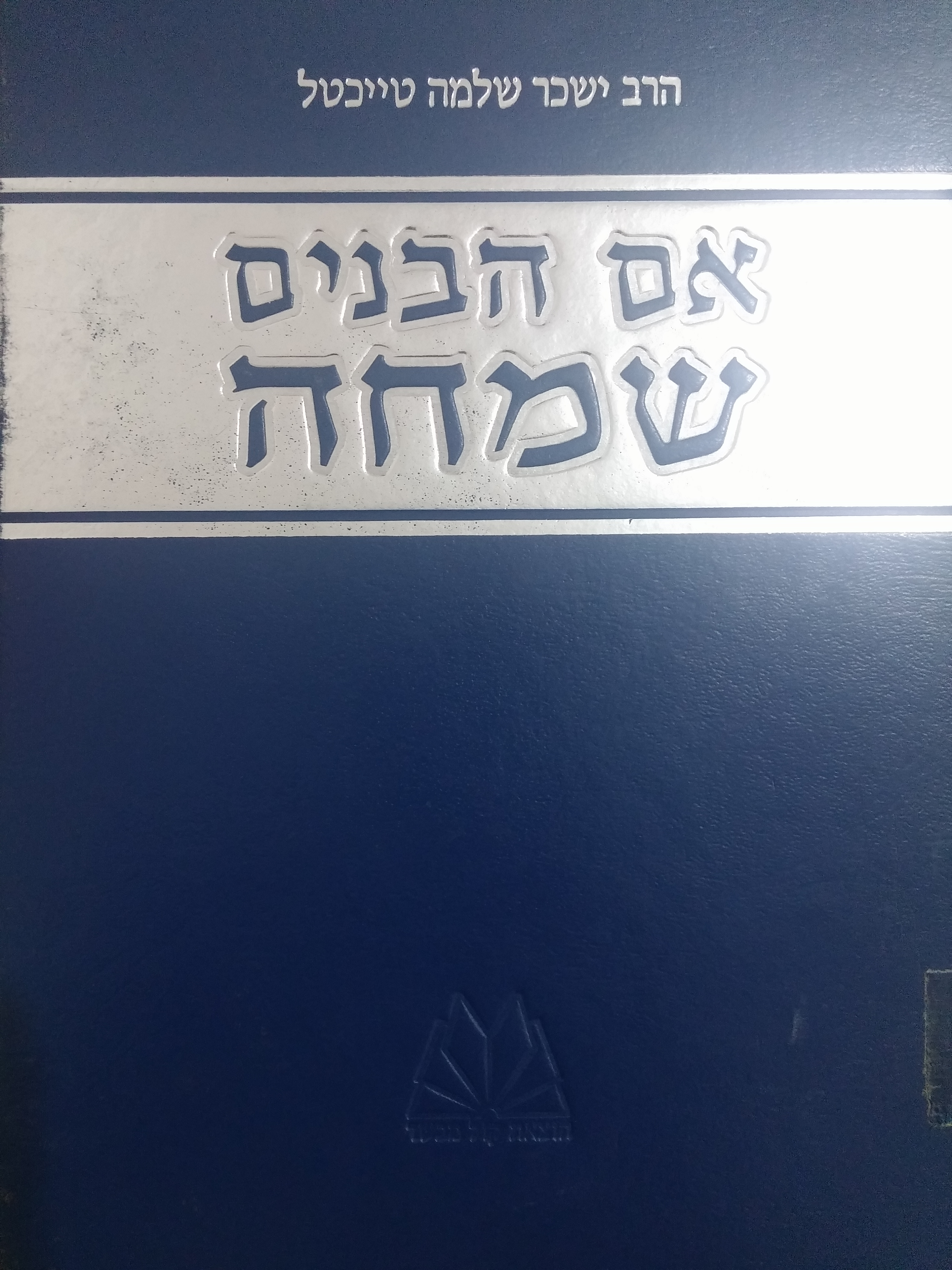
- Hebrew version of Eim HaBanim Semeicha
- Author: Yisachar Shlomo Teichtal
- Subject: The importance of immigration to the land of Israel, the love of the land
- Publication date: 1943

Eim HaBanim Semeicha was written by Rabbi Yisachar Shlomo Teichtal, and published in 1943 in Budapest, Hungary. The title is taken from Psalms and means “A Joyous Mother of Children”.

== The Book ==
Teichtal grew up as a staunch anti-Zionist Chasid of the Munkatsher Rebbe. However, during the Holocaust, Rabbi Teichtal changed his position from the one he espoused in his youth. The physical product of that introspection is the book, Eim HaBanim Semeicha, in which he specifically retracts his previous viewpoints, and argues that the true redemption can only come if the Jewish people unite and rebuild the land of Israel. Many of his coreligionists viewed the book with skepticism, some going so far as to ban Rabbi Teichtal from their synagogues.

In the book, Rabbi Teichtal strongly criticizes the Haredim for not supporting the settlement of the Land of Israel. When it was written, it was a scathing criticism of the Jewish Orthodox establishment, and Agudat Israel in particular.

He writes:

It is clear that he who prepares prior to the Sabbath will eat on the Sabbath (Avodah Zarah, 3a), and since the Haredim did not toil, they have absolutely no influence in the Land (of Israel). Those who toil and build have the influence, and they are the masters of the Land. It is, therefore, no wonder that they are in control... Now, what will the Haredim say? I do not know if they will ever be able to vindicate themselves before the heavenly court for not participating in the movement to rebuild the Land. (p. 23)
