= Yissachar Shlomo Teichtal =

Hungarian rabbi

Yissachar Shlomo Teichtal (9 February 1885–24 January 1945) was one of the few European rabbis to break ranks with Ashkenazi Orthodox Judaism to support an active effort to settle the Land of Israel, then part of Ottoman Palestine and later Mandatory Palestine. He was murdered on a transport train during the closing days of World War II.

== Early life ==
Yissachar Shlomo Teichtal was born in Hungary in 1885 from a family of well-known rabbis and Jewish leaders. His parents were Yitzchak and Gittel Teichtal. His father was a scholar, teacher, and a chasid of the Rebbe of Sanz. At thirteen years of age, Teichtal began his yeshiva study under Rabbi Shalom Weider who was the av beit din (town rabbi) of Nyíregyháza, Hungary. At age fifteen he moved to Żabno (now in Poland), where he was a student of Rabbi Shalom Unger.

Teichtal returned to Hungary and at the age of twenty-one he received rabbinic ordination (semichah) from the Rebbe of Talisheva. He received another ordination a year later from Rabbi Shmuel Rosenberg and a third ordination the same year from Rabbi Mordechai Leib Winkler. Teichtal first married Freidl Ginz when he was 19 years of age. When Freidl died at a young age, he married Nechamah Friedman.

In 1921 Teichtal became the av beit din and Rabbi of Pishtian, i.e. Piešťany, Czechoslovakia (present-day Slovakia), a city famous for its mineral baths. Remaining in Piešťany for 20 years, he established the Moriah yeshiva.

== World War II ==
Czechoslovakia was invaded in 1938 while Teichtal was still residing in Piešťany. As the Nazi oppression increased, he found himself along with ten other family members hiding at the local beit midrash (study hall). From his hiding place, he witnessed many atrocities, including the mass deportation of friends and neighbors.

The Chief Rabbi of Slovakia in Nitra sent messengers offering refuge for Teichtal and his family. In the month of Elul 1942, he and his family escaped into Hungary to go into hiding in Nitra. After much wandering, he finally ended up in Budapest, where he remained for nearly two years. In Budapest he completed his seminal work, Eim HaBanim Semeicha, after working on it for a little more than one year.

In 1944, Hungary was invaded by the Nazis. Thinking that Slovakia might be safe, the Teichtal family returned there to wait out the end of the war. When the Nazis stepped up their efforts to find remaining Jews, Teichtal and his family were captured and transported to Auschwitz.

== Death ==
As the Soviet army advanced through Poland in January 1945, Teichtal and his family were among the inmates of Auschwitz transported deeper into Germany. Teichtal died in a train on his way to the Mauthausen concentration camp on the 10th of Shevat, 5705 (January 24, 1945). The following quote is from Rabbi Chayim Menachem Teichtal, relating an account of his father's death on the train transport:

After starving their victims for a number of days, the oppressors tossed each of them a meager crust of bread, with the evil intent of having them fight pathetically for their paltry allotment. Indeed, one of the Ukrainians grabbed the portion of a Jew – my father’s neighbor – who was desperate for this crust of bread. This angered my father, who demanded the return of the theft. The other travelers begged my father not to get involved, since it might cost him his life. But he said, “How can I stand by when the wronged man’s life depends on this food?” Indeed he insisted on taking a stand, and the Ukrainians, with the cooperation of the Nazi soldiers, rose against him and killed him, after torturing him mercilessly.

== Zionism ==
As a result of the Holocaust, Teichtal changed his position on Land of Israel, as he struggled to make meaning out of what was happening around him. His carefully constructed arguments are outlined in his book Eim HaBanim Semeicha, penned during his wanderings in hiding from his Nazi oppressors and their collaborators. In that work, first published in 1943, he makes a case for the rebuilding of the Land of Israel bringing about the ultimate redemption His original view had been that of the majority in the Hungarian Orthodox Jewish world at the time, which discouraged an active movement for a return of Jews to the Land of Israel. The prevalent view at that time was that God would bring about a return without the need of human intervention. The Holocaust caused him to re-think this approach, and he came to the conclusion that the reason the Jewish people had not been redeemed was because they had not returned to their homeland, the Land of Israel, to resettle and rebuild it to its former glory.

== Legacy ==
Teichtal wrote other works besides Eim HaBanim Semeicha, in particular, a book of responsa entitled Mishneh Sochir. He was a prolific writer, and miraculously a number of his other works survived both his murder and the Holocaust. Some works are still in manuscript form and have not yet been published. The Mishneh Sachir Center located in Bnei Brak, Israel is an advanced Talmudic learning academy named in Teichtal's memory, carrying on his work and preserving his legacy. Teichtal's sermons for the festivals and his Torah commentary were published in 2011 and 2015 respectively, also with the title Mishneh Sochir.

Lately, Isaac Hershkowitz has completed a comprehensive study on Teichtal's works. He demonstrated that some of Teichtal's ideological changes that had been attributed to the war had indeed occurred even earlier – in the early 1930s. This metamorphosis is reflected both in his views and even more significantly in his halakhic methodology.

Moreover, by means of examining the dates of various parts of Eim Habanim Semeichah, and by analyzing Teichtal's ideological stances during the various stages of his compilation, it becomes clear that the book does not present a clear-cut stand on any of the basic issues of Religious Zionism's conceptions, as well as Orthodoxy's beliefs. Moreover, Teichtal's doctrines are filled with retractions and contradictions, and his positions swing from Hungarian Orthodoxy to Religious Zionist thought.

In the earlier stages of Eim HaBanim Semeicha, Teichtal spoke more of the importance of the Land of Israel and its building as a crucial stage of the Redemption, in order to stimulate significant down-to-earth developments. However, in the latter parts of his book, he granted theological and mystical value to indexes measuring inner unity in the Jewish nation, thus protesting actively against the creators of the Orthodox-Neolog schism in Hungarian Jewry.

Hershkowitz argues that Eim HaBanim Semeicha should be analyzed as a dialectical compilation, and not as a canonical work. Accordingly, it is not meant to outline a world with only one meaning, and consequently, Teichtal is not obligated to explain each division. The objective of the compilation is to float fundamental issues of nationalism and derivative ideas such as the link between God and Israel during the Redemption, the nature of Redemption, and methods of its implementation. Teichtal wanted to include within his book the boundaries various implications arising from an open discussion, and not to dictate only one world view. Thus, he did not attempt to obscure this tension; on the contrary, he gave it expression in various ways.

The essence of Eim HaBanim Semeicha, and of the other shifts in Teichtal's religious concepts ever since the rise of the Nazi regime, is affixed to his ability to express harsh criticism of those rabbinic personalities who had shaped his own world, as well as the entire world of Hungarian Orthodoxy for close to eighty years, and publicly criticize the schism within Hungarian Jewish communities in addition to Orthodoxy's shirking of a vision of Redemption.

Rabbi Eli Kavon, while talking about his legacy, said, "His life and death – are a testament to the vibrancy and relevance of the ideas and theology of ultra-Orthodox Jewish rabbis who were murdered by the Nazis and their collaborators during the devastating events of 70 years ago."

== See also ==
- Eim HaBanim Semeicha
