= List of Jewish feminists =

This is a list of Jewish feminists in alphabetical order. list of Jewish feminists.

== Jewish feminists ==
- Bella Abzug (1920–1998)
- Kathy Acker
- Arlene Agus (1949–2024)
- Chantal Akerman (1950–2015)
- Gloria Allred (Born 1941)
- Eleanor Antin
- Franciszka Arnsztajnowa (1865–1942)
- Oreet Ashery
- Adina Bar-Shalom
- Pauline Bebe
- Evelyn Torton Beck
- Hanne Blank
- Lisa Bloom
- Judy Blume
- Elizabeth Bolton
- Susan Bordo
- Daniel Boyarin
- Susan Brownmiller (1935–2025)
- Judith Butler
- Claude Cahun (1894–1954)
- Aviva Cantor
- Nina Beth Cardin
- Naomi Chazan
- Phyllis Chesler
- Judy Chicago
- Hélène Cixous
- Hedwig Dohm (1831–1919)
- Andrea Dworkin (1946-2005)
- Amy Eilberg
- Sandy Eisenberg Sasso
- Eve Ensler
- Jane Evans (1907-2004)
- Susan Faludi
- Leslie Feinberg (1949-2014)
- Rachel Kohl Finegold
- Shulamith Firestone (1945-2012)
- Marcia Freedman (1938-2021)
- Betty Friedan (1921–2006)
- Debbie Friedman (1951-2011)
- Zehava Gal-On
- Sarah Michelle Gellar
- Tavi Gevinson
- Ruth Bader Ginsburg (1933–2020)
- Emma Goldman (1869-1940)
- Elyse Goldstein
- Lynn Gottlieb
- Blu Greenberg
- Daphna Hacker
- Ruth Halperin-Kaddari
- Jack Halberstam
- Charlotte Haldane (1894-1969)
- Nina Hartley
- Tova Hartman
- Judith Hauptman
- Dorothy Ray Healey
- Diana Mara Henry
- Judith Lewis Herman
- Susannah Heschel
- Eva Hesse
- Anat Hoffman
- Brenda Howard
- Sara Hurwitz
- Paula Hyman
- Beba Idelson
- Tal Ilan
- Elfriede Jelinek
- Erica Jong
- Aletta Jacobs
- Elena Kagan
- Roberta Kalechofsky
- Belda Kaufman Lindenbaum
- Michael Kimmel
- Melanie Klein
- Naomi Klein
- Gilah Kletenik
- Edith Konecky
- Anna Kuliscioff
- Michele Landsberg
- Paulina Lebl-Albala
- Lori Hope Lefkovitz
- Gerda Lerner
- Aurora Levins Morales
- Amy-Jill Levine
- Ariel Levy
- Fanny Lewald
- Rosa Luxemburg
- Frederica Sagor Maas
- Ruchama Marton
- Henriette May
- Hana Meisel
- Annie Nathan Meyer
- Selma Meyer
- Merav Michaeli
- Robin Morgan
- Cheryl Moch
- Haviva Ner-David
- Martha Nussbaum
- Margit Oelsner-Baumatz
- Rose Pastor Stokes
- Laurie Penny
- Judith Plaskow
- Letty Cottin Pogrebin
- Bertha Pappenheim
- Rachel Pollack
- Griselda Pollock
- Katha Pollitt
- Virginia Postrel
- Sally Priesand
- Lydia Rabinowitsch-Kempner
- Yvonne Rainer
- Geela Rayzel Raphael
- Ruth Rasnic
- Avital Ronell
- Rachel Rosenthal
- Tamar Ross
- Muriel Rukeyser
- Danya Ruttenberg
- Nina Salaman
- Zalman Schachter-Shalomi
- Miriam Schapiro
- Rosika Schwimmer
- Eve Kosofsky Sedgwick
- Alice Shalvi
- Mendel Shapiro
- Ella Shohat
- Sheila Shulman
- Kaja Silverman
- Joan Snyder
- Susan Sontag
- Daniel Sperber
- Annie Sprinkle
- Gertrude Stein
- Gloria Steinem (1934–2026)
- Sandra Steingraber
- Estelle Sternberger (1886–1971)
- Elana Maryles Sztokman
- Meredith Tax
- Mierle Laderman Ukeles
- Yona Wallach
- Rebecca Walker
- Wendy Wasserstein
- Trude Weiss-Rosmarin
- Naomi Weisstein
- Hannah Wilke
- Naomi Wolf
- Diana Yoel
- Tamar Zandberg

== See also ==
- Jewish feminism
- Judaism and women
- Jewish left
- List of feminists
- Jewish mother stereotype
- Jewish-American princess
- Jewish Orthodox Feminist Alliance
- Lilith (magazine)
- National Council of Jewish Women
- Partnership minyan
- Role of women in Judaism
- Shira Hadasha
