= 1937 Beert KLM Douglas DC-2 crash =

Aviation accident in Belgium in 1937

Beert KLM Douglas DC-2 crash
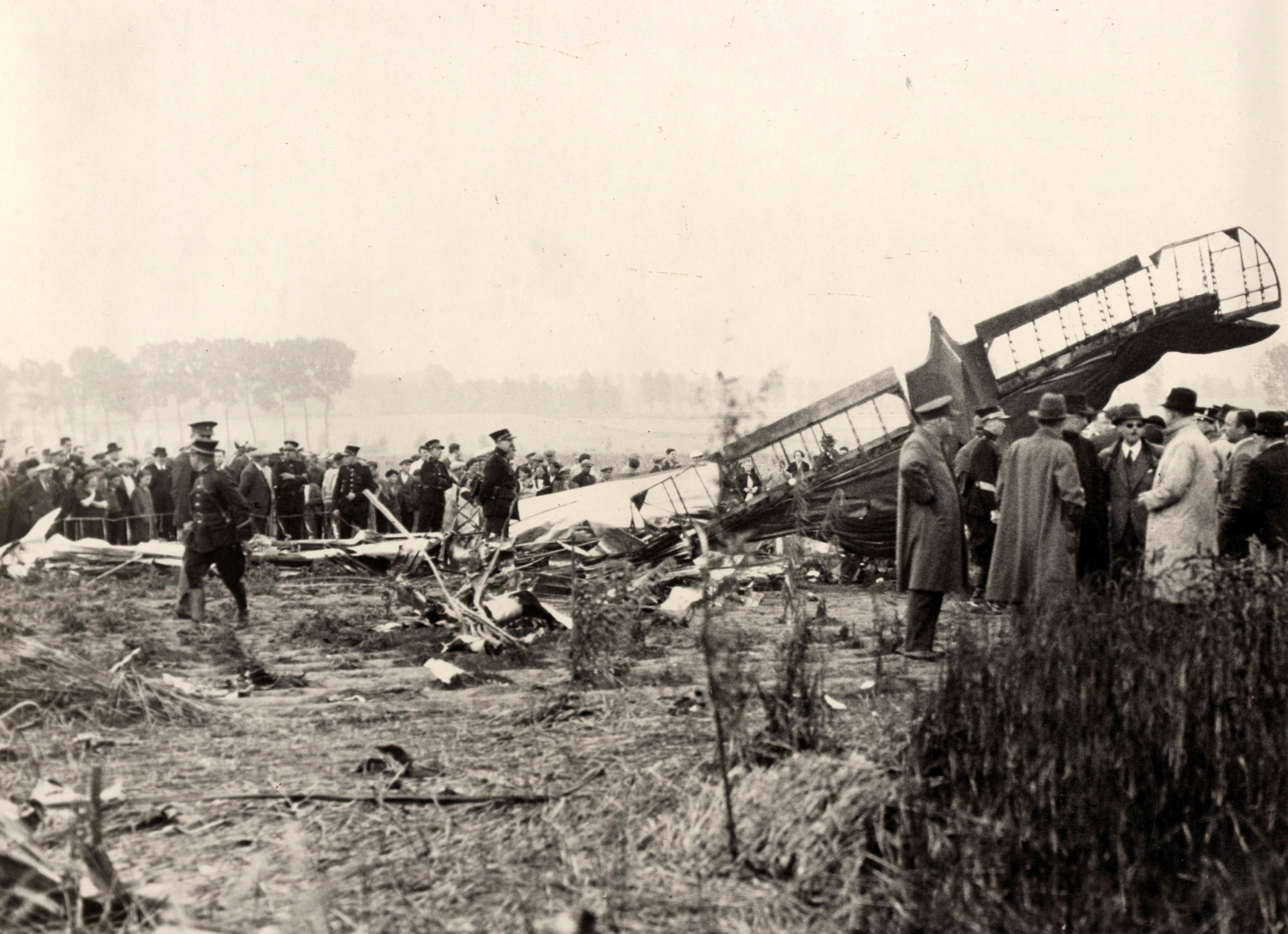
- Disaster site, with wreckage visible

Occurrence
- Date: 28 July 1937
- Summary: In-flight fire following explosion; cause undetermined
- Site: Potato field near Beert, near Halle, Belgium

Aircraft
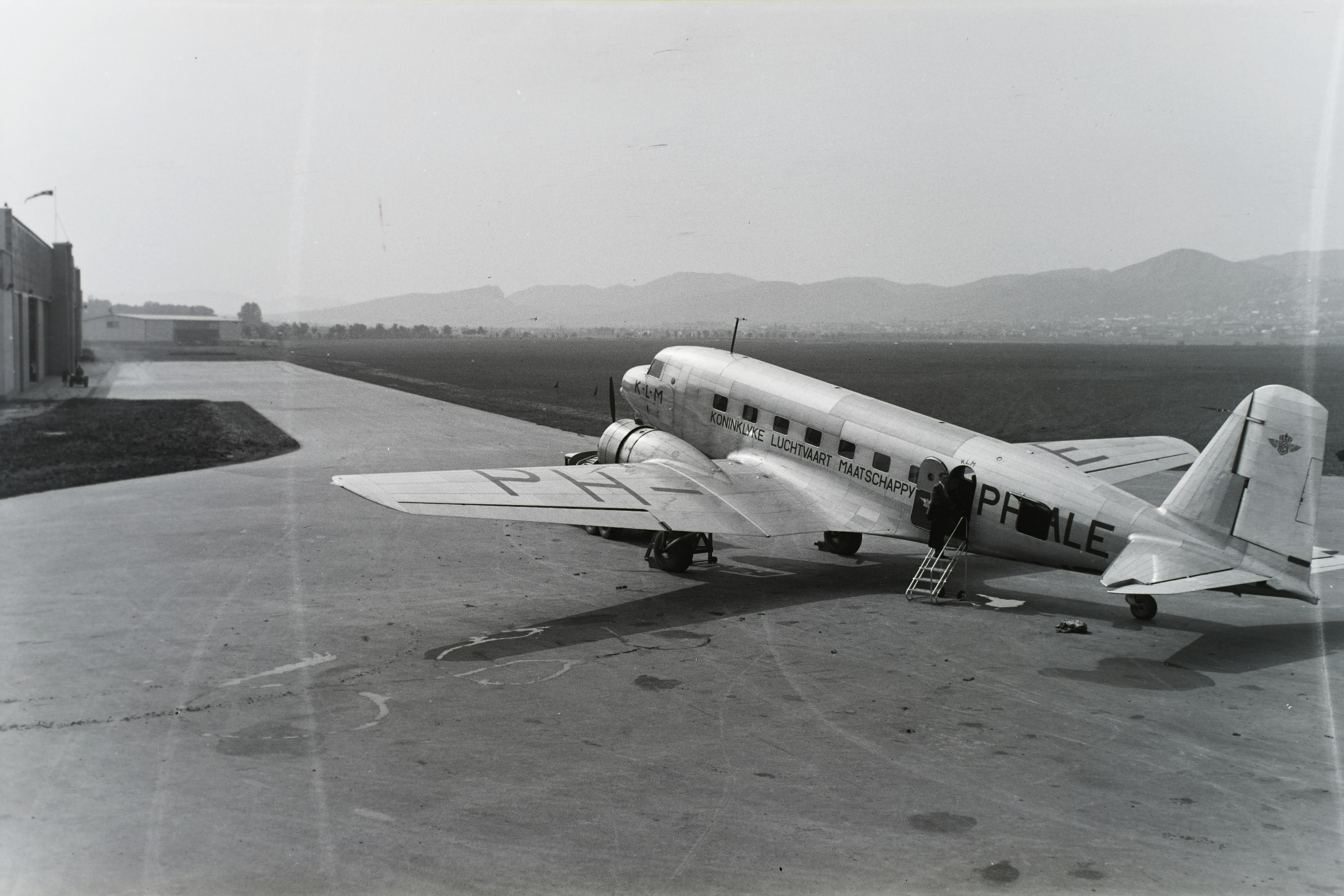
- PH-ALE, a similar Douglas DC-2 of KLM
- Aircraft type: Douglas DC-2
- Operator: KLM
- Registration: PH-ALF
- Flight origin: Schiphol Airport, Amsterdam, Netherlands
- Stopover: Evere Airport, Brussels, Belgium
- Destination: Paris, France
- Passengers: 11
- Crew: 4
- Fatalities: 15
- Survivors: 0

The Beert KLM Douglas DC-2 crash occurred on 28 July 1937, when a KLM Douglas DC-2 aircraft named Flamingo (registration PH-ALF) crashed shortly after takeoff from Brussels, Belgium, following an in-flight fire. The aircraft went down in a potato field near Beert, Pepingen close to Halle, southwest of Brussels.

All 15 people on board were killed, including Dutch socialist Nathan Nathans.

The crash resulted in awereness of transporting flammable goods, including flammable film equipment. Non-flammable interior materials and paints were introduced inside aircraft and the KLM made several aircraft modifications to the installation to reduce the risk of fire.

In the following decades, the crash was remembered as one of the most severe aviation accidents in Dutch history.

== Aircraft ==
The aircraft involved was a Douglas DC-2 named Flamingo, registered PH-ALF. It was the last DC-2 ordered by KLM and the 124th example of the type produced, with construction number 1585.

The aircraft was delivered on 21 April 1936 by the Douglas Aircraft Company in Santa Monica, California, and was transferred to KLM via Fokker as the license holder for the type. On the day of delivery, it was flown to New York. It was subsequently transported in a disassembled state aboard the steamship SS Statendam to Rotterdam, where it arrived on 28 May 1936. The aircraft was registered in the Netherlands civil aviation register on 16 April 1936 under registration number 185. Like other KLM DC-2 aircraft, it was named after a bird, with the registration reflecting the name.

The DC-2 was an all-metal aircraft powered by two Wright Cyclone SGR 1820-F52 piston engines, each producing 750 horsepower. It had a cruising speed of approximately 290 kilometres per hour, a range of 1,750 kilometres, and a maximum takeoff weight of 8.4 tonnes. KLM operated a total of 18 DC-2 aircraft, which were initially introduced to replace Fokker aircraft on long-distance routes, including services to the Dutch East Indies, and later used on European routes.

== Crew and passengers ==
There were 15 people on board the aircraft, consisting of four crew members and eleven passengers. None survived the crash.

=== Crew ===
There were four crew members on board.

- Captain Cornelius Theo Regnerus Steensma, a 23-year-old pilot born in Hellevoetsluis, who had obtained his pilot's license in 1934 and joined KLM in 1936
- Second pilot and flight engineer Gerardus Geering, aged 24, from Rotterdam, who had joined KLM in October 1936 and also served as a reserve officer in the Dutch Army Air Force
- radio operator Bernardus Ludekuize, aged 25, from Durgerdam
- Stewardess Martha Johanna van der Laan, aged 25, from Helpman, Groningen, who had joined KLM earlier in 1937 and had already completed several flights.

=== Passengers ===
The eleven passengers represented several nationalities, including Belgian, British, Mexican, German, Dutch, and American citizens. Two passengers had boarded the aircraft at Schiphol, while the remaining nine joined the flight in Brussels after arriving from Cologne, Germany. Among the passengers was KLM engineer A. Wapperon, who was travelling in a non-working capacity.

The crash also killed Nathan Nathans (born 1883) who was a Dutch socialist trade union leader who played a key role in organizing railway and transport workers nationally and internationally, particularly through the International Transport Workers' Federation where he served as secretary. A committed but modest activist, he combined union work with political engagement and anti-fascist efforts.

== Accident ==
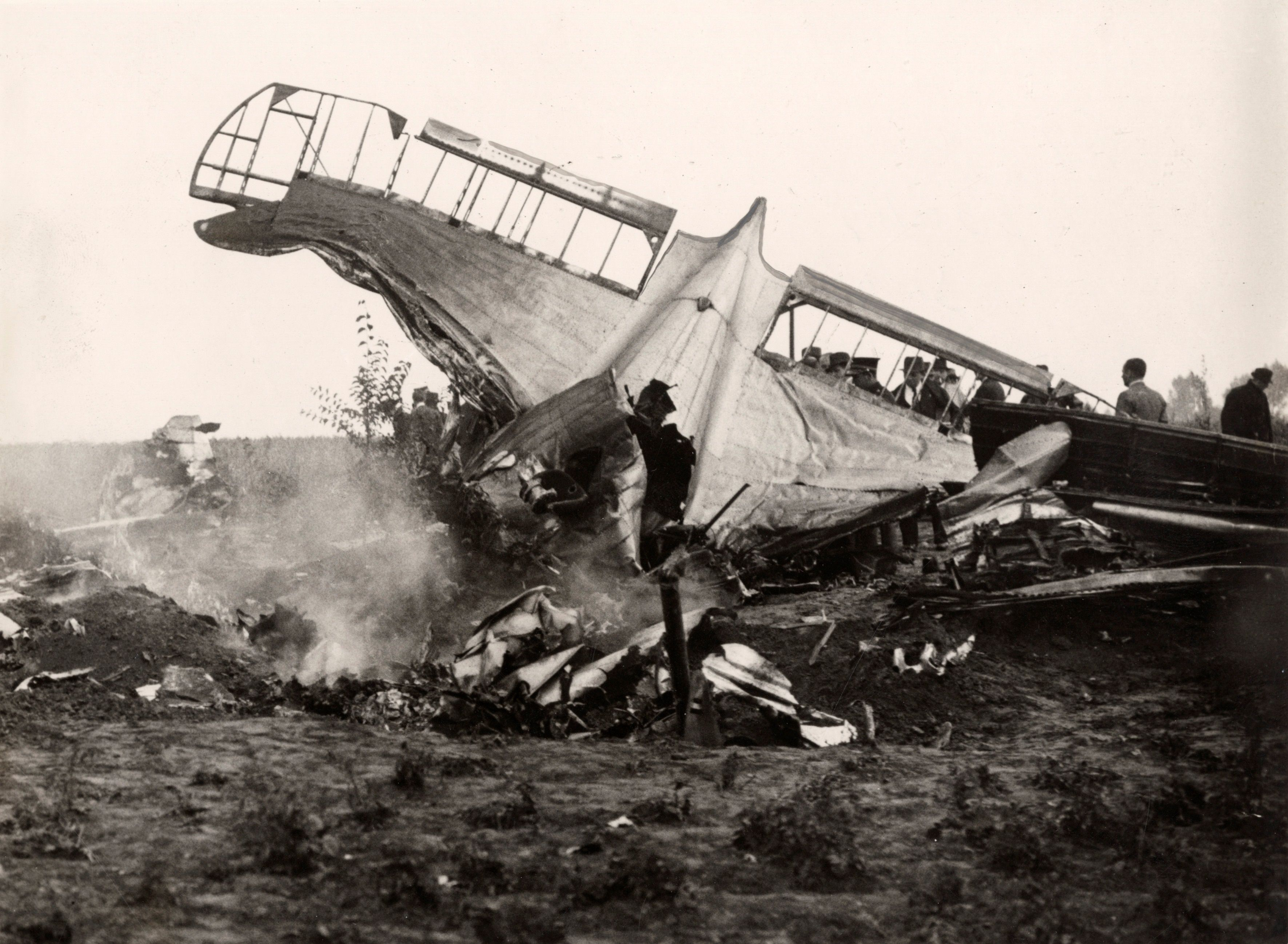
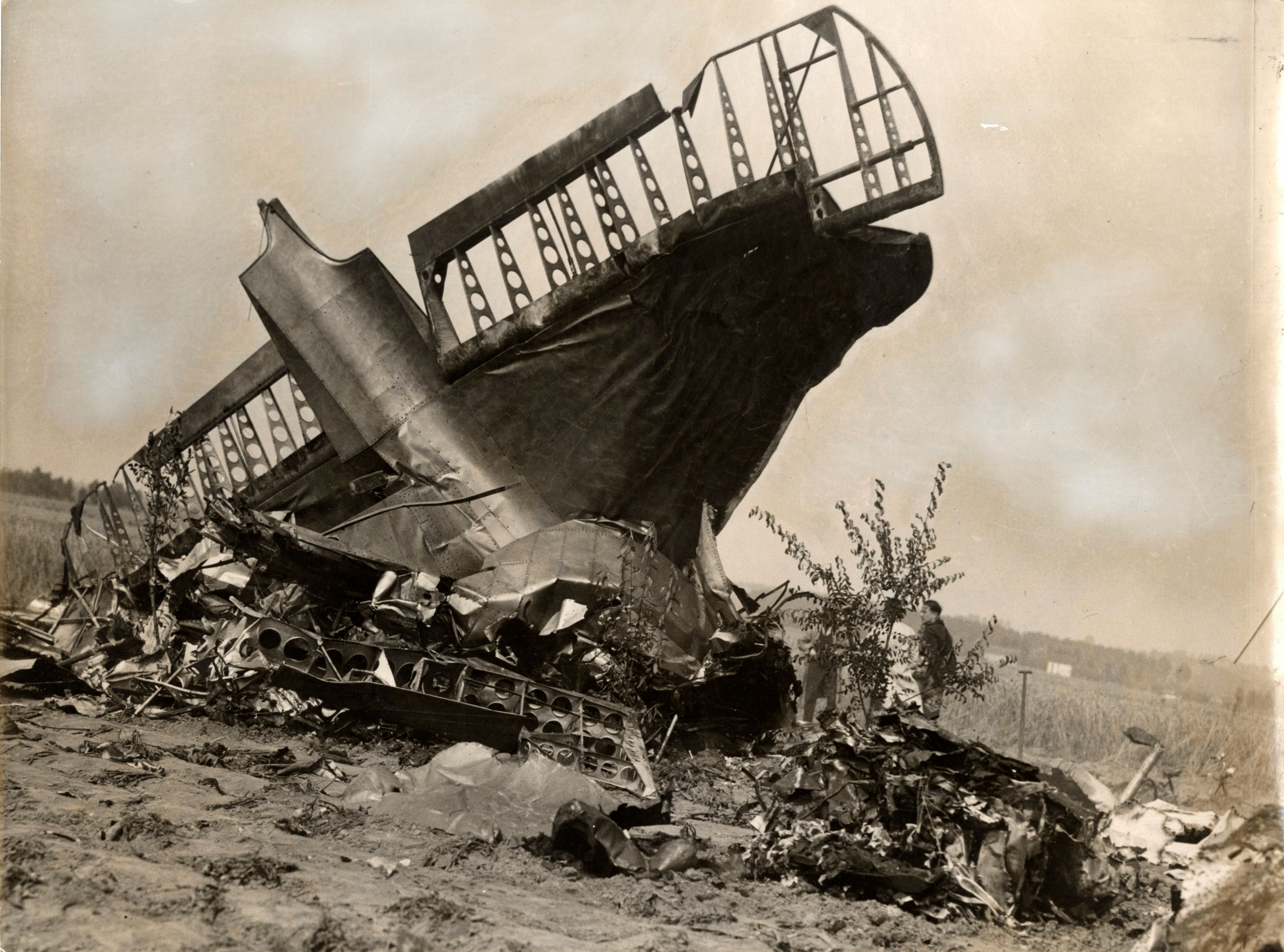
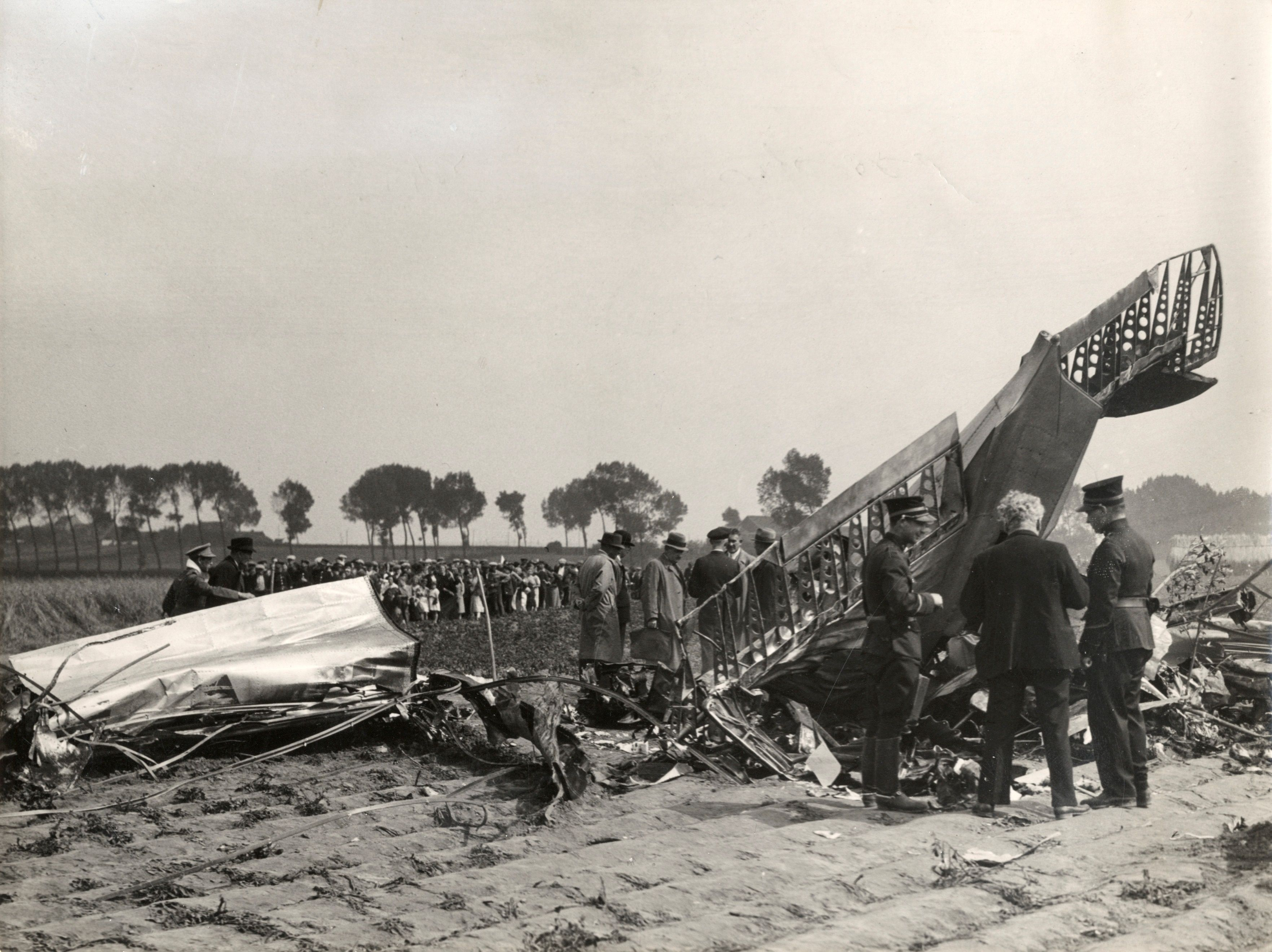
Multiple images of the disaster site

On 28 July 1937, the aircraft was operating a scheduled KLM service from Schiphol Airport to Paris, with a planned intermediate stop at Brussels. The flight departed Schiphol Airport at 9:20 with a crew of four and two passengers on board. Upon arrival at Evere Airport in Brussels, nine additional passengers boarded the aircraft, having arrived from Cologne, Germany, while the two original passengers remained on board.

At approximately 10:30 local time, the aircraft departed Brussels for the final leg to Paris. Weather conditions were not considered severe, although rain showers were present in the area.

Shortly after takeoff, when the aircraft had reached an altitude of approximately 400 metres, an explosion is believed to have occurred. Witness accounts and later investigation indicated that the aircraft caught fire while still airborne. At approximately 10:40, the burning aircraft crashed into a potato field near the railway station at Beert. The crash site was located slightly southwest of Brussels, near the town of Halle.

All 15 occupants, consisting of four crew members and eleven passengers, were killed in the accident.

== Cause ==
=== Oil reservoir speculation ===
Belgian newspaper Het Laatste Nieuws suggested that the crash was likely caused by an explosion or fire originating from an oil reservoir near the engines, possibly triggered by a leak and ignition. This theory was based on observations such as the aircraft initially flying normally, then suddenly becoming unstable, along with witness reports of a large cloud of smoke near one of the wings. It was proposed that leaking oil might have spread over the aircraft and ignited, possibly due to a spark or lightning, leading to a rapid fire and crash.

However, De Maasbode disputed this explanation after consulting technical experts from KLM. According to their investigation, the theory lacks any factual basis. The experts concluded that the fire actually began inside the cabin, not in the engines or oil tanks. Examination of the engines and oil reservoirs showed no signs of leaks or defects, and the placement of these tanks in the wings was described as standard and not unusually dangerous. They also emphasized that there was no evidence of oil spreading across the aircraft or causing the fire.

=== Official reporting ===
Belgian authorities initiated an investigation into the crash, with participation from Dutch experts.

==== Provisional findings ====
Belgian judicial authorities and aviation experts conducted extensive research, including examination of similar aircraft at Schiphol. Evidence recovered from the crash site and surrounding area; such as an intact emergency hatch found far from the wreckage, partially burned objects and cabin components showing intense internal burning; indicated that the fire originated in the rear of the cabin and spread rapidly. There were also signs that passengers or crew attempted to respond, including opening the emergency exit and possibly trying to extinguish the fire.

The provisional findings of the investigation was published in August 1937 and concluded with increasing certainty that the crash was caused by a fire that broke out during flight in the passenger cabin, rather than by engine failure. Early witness reports suggesting flames from an engine were later discounted, as technical examination showed both engines had been functioning normally up to the moment of the accident and were largely intact where protected from post-impact fire.

Medical examination suggested that the victims died from smoke inhalation before the aircraft impacted the ground. While the precise cause of the fire could not yet be definitively established, investigators considered possibilities such as an electrical short circuit or accidental ignition caused by a passenger, with speculation including flammable materials such as film stock.

==== Final report ====
The final report was published on 19 July 1938. The investigators found strong indications that an explosion had occurred during flight, followed by a fire in the passenger cabin. This conclusion was supported by the distribution pattern of wreckage and human remains, as well as the extent and nature of burn damage observed.

Instrument evidence, particularly from the aircraft's barograph, showed that the aircraft initially performed a normal climb to approximately 1,200 metres. This was followed by a descent, which began gradually but then accelerated suddenly. The barograph trace became irregular and heavily distorted, suggesting that a sudden shock, likely an explosion, had disrupted the instrument's operation.

Investigators considered several possible causes. One theory was that a short circuit occurred in combination with leaking fuel, allowing ignition. Another possibility was that a passenger had carelessly used a lighter, igniting flammable materials. The presence of highly combustible film stock on board was noted, as well as the use of nitrocellulose-based materials in the aircraft's interior finishes and paint. It was suggested that if an initial fire could not be extinguished quickly, explosive gases might have accumulated in the cabin and ignited, possibly when an emergency exit was opened. This latter hypothesis was not accepted by Belgian authorities. Nonetheless, there was general agreement that the fire originated in the cabin rather than in the engines or cockpit. The exact initiating cause of the explosion and fire was never conclusively determined.

==== Responses ====
After reviewing the detailed reports from Belgian and Dutch experts, the Dutch Aviation Council decided not to conduct a further investigation. The preliminary inquiry had been unable to determine even the probable cause of the accident, and since all occupants perished, the Council considered it unlikely that further research would clarify the origin of the in-flight fire.

== Aftermath ==
The crash occurred just before the start of the AVIA aviation exhibition in The Hague and cast a shadow over the event. During the opening of the event the minister of infrastructure Johan van Buuren commemorated the disaster.

In the Netherlands, 1937 was noted for a series of significant aviation accidents. It was also noted as the fifth loss of a KLM Douglas DC-2, following earlier accidents involving aircraft named Uiver, Maraboe, Gaai, and Lijster. In the following months a discussion was raised about the reliability of Douglas aircraft.

In the following decades, the crash was remembered as one of the most severe aviation accidents in Dutch history.

=== Funerals ===
Following the crash, the remains of several victims, including the four crew members and some passengers, were transported to the Netherlands for burial or cremation. Members of the crew were buried in separate ceremonies across the Netherlands, each attended by large numbers of mourners and representatives from the aviation sector. Captain C. T. R. Steensma was buried on 3 August in Wageningen, where the funeral drew significant public and professional attendance, including representatives of KLM, foreign airlines and the aviation industry. Second pilot-mechanic J. Geering was interred the same day in Rotterdam. His funeral was marked by a more subdued ceremony at the request of the family, though it was attended by colleagues and aviation representatives. Crew member Ari Wapperom was buried in Papendrecht in the presence of thousands of local residents and officials. Stewardess M. J. van der Laan was laid to rest at Zorgvlied cemetery in Amsterdam following a solemn ceremony attended by family, colleagues, and KLM representatives. The funeral of Nathan Nathans was held in the Concertgebouw in Amsterdam, where around two thousand people gathered in a solemn memorial attended by representatives of international and Dutch labour organizations.

=== Measures ===
As the flight carried flammable film equipment that potentially caused the crash. It was the first time a discussion arose about the safety of transporting flammable films inside an aircraft. A KLM pilot refused to fly without the assurance that no flammable materials would be on board, and didn't fly for at least five weeks. In October 1937 the KLM stated that it assured that sufficient measures have been taken for the transport of such hazardous cargo.

The crassh prompted safety adjustements within KLM's fleet of Douglas aircraft. These included the installation of non-flammable interior materials and paints, as well as technical modifications designed to prevent electrical sparks from coming into contact with fuel vapours.

=== Mail recovery ===
The aircraft carried approximately 5 kilograms of airmail intended for France. Much of this mail was heavily damaged in the crash and subsequent fire. Initially it was presumed that all the mail was lost. However, some items survived and were later delivered by the French postal service with special markings and became sought after by philatelic collectors of crash covers.
