= Selma Meyer =

Dutch pacifist, feminist and resistance fighter

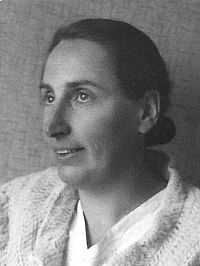
- Born: Sara Cato Meyer; 6 July 1890; Amsterdam, Netherlands
- Died: 11 February 1941 (aged 50); Berlin, Nazi Germany
- Occupations: Entrepreneur; feminist; pacifist

Sara Cato (Selma) Meyer (also Meijer) (Amsterdam, 6 July 1890 – Berlin, 11 February 1941) was a Dutch pacifist, feminist and resistance fighter.

== Early years and working life ==
She was born into a Jewish family in Amsterdam. Her father was Moritz Meyer (1865–1906); her mother, Sophie Meyer-Philips (1868–1955), was a cousin and a niece of the founders of the Philips lightbulb factory, later the Philips Company in Eindhoven. Yella Rottländer's grandfather is Selma's brother, Justus Meyer.

She started work at the age of 18 and for the first ten years was a shorthand typist. In 1923, she and Annette Monasch took over the Holland Typing Office (HTO), a company that provided typing and copy services, as well as being one of the first employment agencies in the Netherlands, providing shorthand typists, and later selling typewriters.

== Social involvement ==
In 1923, Meyer became a member of the Pacifist Women's League; the Dutch section of the Women's International League for Peace and Freedom, of which she became secretary. President at the time was Cornelia Ramondt-Hirschmann. In the 1930s, Meyer served on various committees, among which were ones for the assistance and relief of young German refugees and for victims of the Spanish Civil War. She participated in the Wuppertal Committee and helped support the resistance in Germany.

From 1930 to 1936, she was a member of the SDAP. She was one of the founders of the National Peace Centre (NVC) on 13 August 1936 and in January 1937, with CPN chairman Ko Beuzemaker and railway unionist Nathan Nathans, she attended an International Conference for Aid to Republican Spain, which was held in Paris.

In 1937, she met Hans Ebeling, with whom she was to become a close friend. In addition, she was in charge of the Holland Typing Office, which only employed women and which played an important part in the publication of Kameradschaft, a magazine by Ebeling and Theo Hespers. She helped both Ebeling and Hespers create a safe haven and financially supported Kameradschaft and other publications by Ebeling and Hespers. By the end of 1939 Meyer was prominently listed in the 'Sonderfahndungsliste', a list of people to be traced and questioned after the German invasion of the Netherlands prepared by the Abwehr, the German military-intelligence service for the Wehrmacht.

In April 1940, Meyer became ill. By the time the German troops invaded the Netherlands on 10 May 1940, she had travelled to Zeeland to recover. From there she fled to France. Because of concerns for her mother and her employees at the HTO, she returned to Amsterdam and joined the Dutch resistance. On 26 October 1940, she was arrested. After interrogation in Amsterdam and The Hague, Meyer was transferred to Berlin in mid-November to be interrogated by the Gestapo in the prison of Berlin-Moabit. In January 1941, Meyer got peritonitis and was taken to the Jüdisches Krankenhaus der Gemeinde zu Berlin. There she died, aged 50, of complications that occurred after surgery. She was buried in an unmarked grave at the Jewish cemetery in Weißensee.

== See also ==
- List of peace activists
