= Kleiner =

Kleiner (Hebrew: קליינר) is a German or Jewish surname, meaning "smaller", "lesser", or "minor":

- Alfred Kleiner, Swiss physicist
- Marianne Kleiner, Swiss politician
- Bruce Kleiner, American mathematician
- Krista Arrieta Kleiner, Filipino-American TV actress/singer and host
- Dick Kleiner, Hollywood columnist
- Eugene Kleiner, Silicon Valley venture capitalist
- Helga Kleiner, German politician
- Israel Kleiner (biochemist) (1885-1966), biochemist
- Israel Kleiner (mathematician), Canadian mathematician, professor at McGill University
- John J. Kleiner, US Congressman from Indiana
- Michael Kleiner, Israeli politician
- Morris Kleiner, American professor of public affairs
- Rob Kleiner, American songwriter, producer
- Sergio Kleiner, Argentine soap opera star
- Yosef Kleiner, rabbi, psychologist, actor and intellectual

== Fictional characters ==
- Isaac Kleiner, from the video games Half-Life and Half-Life 2.
