= Or Haneshamah =

Or Haneshamah – Ottawa's Reconstructionist Community
- Location in Ottawa

Religion
- Affiliation: Reconstructionist Judaism
- Ecclesiastical or organizational status: Synagogue
- Leadership: Rabbi Elizabeth Bolton
- Year consecrated: 1987
- Status: Active

Location
- Location: 30 Cleary Avenue, Ottawa, Ontario K2A 4A1
- Interactive map of Or Haneshamah – Ottawa's Reconstructionist Community
- Coordinates: 45.3822°N 75.7724°W

Website
- www.orh.ca

Or Haneshamah, officially, Or Haneshamah – Ottawa's Reconstructionist Community, is a Jewish Reconstructionist synagogue located in Ottawa, Ontario, Canada. The congregation is one of only three affiliated Reconstructionist congregations in Canada, and the only Reconstructionist congregation in Ottawa. Founded in 1987, Or Haneshamah describes itself as a progressive, liberal, egalitarian, inclusive, multi-generational congregation notable for welcoming all Jews, including unaffiliated, intermarried, and LGBTQ individuals and families. As of 2016, the congregation's membership constituted approximately 90–100 households.

Originally a lay- and student-led Havurah, in 2013 Rabbi Elizabeth Bolton became Or Haneshamah's first permanent rabbi. She is Ottawa's first female congregational rabbi and the city's first openly gay rabbi. In 2016 Rabbi Bolton was named one of "America's Most Inspiring Rabbis" by The Forward.

== History ==
Or Haneshamah was founded as the Ottawa Reconstructionist Havurah by Walter and Teena Hendelman in 1987. The Havurah originally formed as a study group at Temple Israel, Ottawa's Reform Synagogue, to explore the differences between Reconstructionism and other branches of Judaism. In February 1989, with ten household members, It formally became a member of the Ottawa Vaad Ha'ir, now the Jewish Federation of Ottawa. At that time they also were granted affiliation with the Federation of Reconstructionist Congregations and Havurot, now the Jewish Reconstructionist Communities.

Havurah meetings were initially held in member's homes. As their numbers grew, they began holding regular Shabbat and holiday services and lifecycle events in rented spaces, primarily in The Glebe neighborhood of Ottawa. In 1994, Or Haneshamah acquired its own Torah scroll. In July of that year they celebrated their first Bnei Mitzvah of four adult women. The first Bar Mitzvah was held in July 1997.

Beginning in 2004 Or Haneshamah began hosting rabbinical students from the Reconstructionist Rabbinical College in Philadelphia, who would come to Ottawa one weekend a month and for High Holidays. In 2009, the community adopted the Hebrew name Or Haneshamah, or “light of the spirit”. In 2012, the community hired a permanent rabbi, Elizabeth Bolton, who arrived in August 2013. At that time, Or Haneshamah also moved to its current location in the First Unitarian Congregation of Ottawa building. Or Haneshamah is one of only three affiliated Reconstructionist congregations in Canada, along with Congregation Dorshei Emet in Montreal and Congregation Darchei Noam in Toronto.

== Programming ==
Or Haneshamah is known for its egalitarian, inclusive, and participatory services, and its unique and innovative service formats, including Shabbat Limmud (an abbreviated service with extended torah study), Ruach Shabbat (liturgy combined with mindfulness and yoga), Shabbat Chanting Service (chanting prayer and wordless melody, accompanied by drumming and movement), and Shabbat in the Park, a Shabbat morning service held outdoors during the summer months.

Or Haneshamah has a number of regular adult education and cultural programs, including: a monthly Jewish Mindfulness Meditation group; “Exploring Judaism: A Course for Inquisitive Jews, their Significant Others, Those Considering Adult B’nei Mitzvah, and Seekers of Jewish Life”; a "Learning After Lunch" Series that included (in 2015-16), "Who Wrote the Bible?," "Prayerbook Hebrew," and "Mapping the Siddur – Becoming a Service Maven"; and book and movie discussion groups.

In 2015 Or Haneshamah launched "Machaneh Shabbat" (Shabbat Camp), an experiential learning program aimed at primary school children but open to all ages, and it continues its longstanding pre-bar/bat mitzvah program, BaMaaGal ("In the Circle").

Or Haneshamah is involved in a number of social action initiatives, including the Multifaith Housing Initiative, the Ottawa Kosher Food Bank and the Shalom Group, a group of Ottawa-area congregations formed in 2015 to support the private sponsorship of a Syrian refugee family.
