= Elizabeth Bolton (rabbi) =

Canadian rabbi and feminist

Personal life
- Born: 1956 (age 69–70)

Elizabeth Bolton (born 1956) is a rabbi, feminist, and activist. Hired in 2013 by Reconstructionist synagogue Or Haneshamah, she is Ottawa's first female and openly gay rabbi. In the late 1980’s, she led efforts to address the exclusion of women from the cantorate in Canada.

== Early life and education ==
Bolton was born in 1956 and grew up in Chomedey, Quebec, where she attended an Orthodox congregation with her family and studied at United Talmud Torah Schools as well as Chomedey High School and Vanier College. She graduated from Concordia University and McGill University for music studies. Additionally, she pursued advanced studies in art song at the American Institute for Musical Studies in Graz, Austria, and participated in the Advanced Opera Training Programme in Victoria, BC under the supervision of Leopold Simoneau and Pierrette Alarie.

== Career as an opera singer and cantor ==
Bolton initially pursued a career in classical music, performing opera as well as church and choral music. She had performed as a mezzo-soprano with the Studio de Musique Ancienne de Montreal, the Tudor Singers, and the Opera de Montreal. She also had appeared in a Vancouver Opera production of Carmen. She was transitioning to more solo work when an unexpected career change occurred. During a "master class" at The Royal Conservatory of Music in Toronto, where she performed Jewish liturgical music, members of Temple Emanu-El, a Reform synagogue, were in the audience. With their cantor ill, Bolton was asked to fill in and eventually to stay on permanently (1986–1989) when it became clear the regular cantor could not return. While she had to learn additional liturgical music to take on this role, she noted it was less challenging in a Reform temple, where cantors and choirs typically perform set pieces.

During her time in Toronto from 1985 to 1989, Bolton launched the Chai Project to promote AIDS education in the Jewish community. In 1986 she asked Rabbi Deborah Brin of the Reconstructionist Congregation Darchei Noam to study liturgy with her. It was then she learned about and was drawn to approaches of Reconstructionist Judaism.

She also spearheaded the creation of Kol Nashim, a performing ensemble of female cantors. Their first performance at Temple Emanu-El was criticized by the president of the Toronto Council of Hazzanim's (TCH), who said their presence diminished the professionalism of the cantorate. Bolton said that they were conveying to young girls that they can be leaders and that women could develop leadership skills in ritual practice without requiring institutional validation. She also noted that as feminists they were demonstrating that involvement can bring change to Judaism. The TCH's strong disapproval of the Kol Nashim concert sparked media interest. CBC host Peter Gzowski interviewed Kol Nashim members on national radio about the legitimacy of female cantors, and Bolton debated the issue with a male cantor on CTV.

The CBC and TV Ontario produced documentaries on her work as a singer, cantor, teacher and Jewish feminist.

While in Toronto she began considering formal studies to support her career as a cantor. Aware of her limitations in chanting from the Torah, she sought out a traditional cantor willing to teach her. However, their relationship ended when leading Conservative cantors in Toronto opposed the acceptance of women cantors. Upon investigating cantorial education further, she realized she desired a broader spiritual foundation in Judaism. It was during this exploration she recognized that she could combine activism, music, feminism, and queer consciousness. She also decided she would serve in the Reconstructionist movement as the Reconstructionist Rabbinical College was the first to accept queer lesbian and gay candidates. She viewed the rabbinate as a way to merge her increasing interest in Judaism with her activism in women's issues.

== Rabbinic career ==
In 1989, Bolton moved to Philadelphia to attend rabbinical school at the Reconstructionist Rabbinical College (RRC) even though she wasn't sure she would be able to work as a rabbi as an out lesbian. At RRC, she served on an AIDS task force and helped launch a women's studies project. She also founded and directed the ApiChorus, an RRC choir where students write much of the music performed. Some of this music was designed to complement sections of the Reconstructionist prayer book. Graduating from RRC in 1996, she was one of the first Canadian women to be ordained as a rabbi.

Bolton became the founding director of RRC's Centre for Jewish Creativity to focus on the Jewish heritage of drama, art and music and encourage personal creativity in a Jewish context. She also served on the RRC faculty as an instructor of singing and liturgical chant. In 1999, she became the first full-time rabbi at Congregation Beit Tikvah in Baltimore. During her tenure, she gained experience in conflict resolution, Holocaust education, and support of at-risk children in Ghana, and helped found a multifaith non-profit group to provide support for homeless families. The legalization of same-sex marriage in Massachusetts in 2004 prompted Bolton to stop signing marriage licences and only perform religious ceremonies. She was troubled by the discrepancy between her ability to legally marry couples and the state's prohibition on same-sex marriage.

In 2013, she was appointed the permanent rabbi of Or Haneshamah in Ottawa, becoming the city's first female and openly gay rabbi. She is a member of T'ruah: The Rabbinic Call for Human Rights and has spoken up for human rights of Jews and Palestinians as well for Israel's democracy. In 2015 she and two other Ottawa religious leaders urged the Canadian government to expedite the process of resettling Syrian refugees. When asked about Passover observance in 2024 in the midst of the Gaza war, Bolton said that Jews would likely have varied approaches due to different reactions to the conflict. She noted that Passover traditions are flexible and can address contemporary issues, and speaking as a chaplain recognized that some might feel reluctant to celebrate and that it is acceptable to observe Passover differently if needed. She was selected by The Forward in 2016 as one of America's most inspiring rabbis.
