= Estelle Sternberger =

American Jewish peace activist

Estelle Miller Sternberger
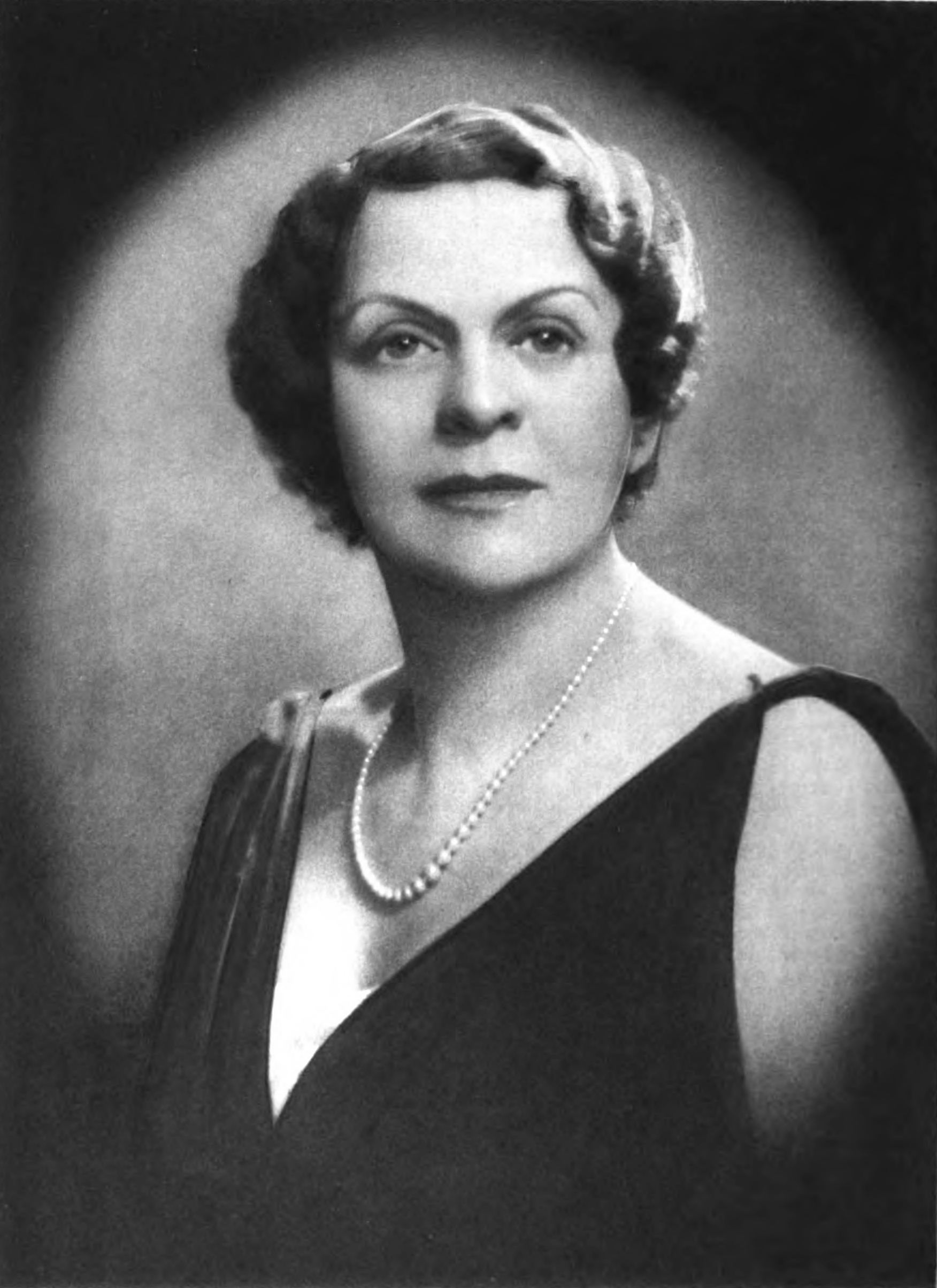
- Born: Estelle Miller; July 6, 1886; Cincinnati, Ohio, U.S.
- Died: December 23, 1971 (aged 85); New York City, New York, U.S.
- Education: University of Cincinnati
- Occupations: Activist; writer; broadcaster
- Spouses: Harry Sternberger; J. Max Weiss

Signature
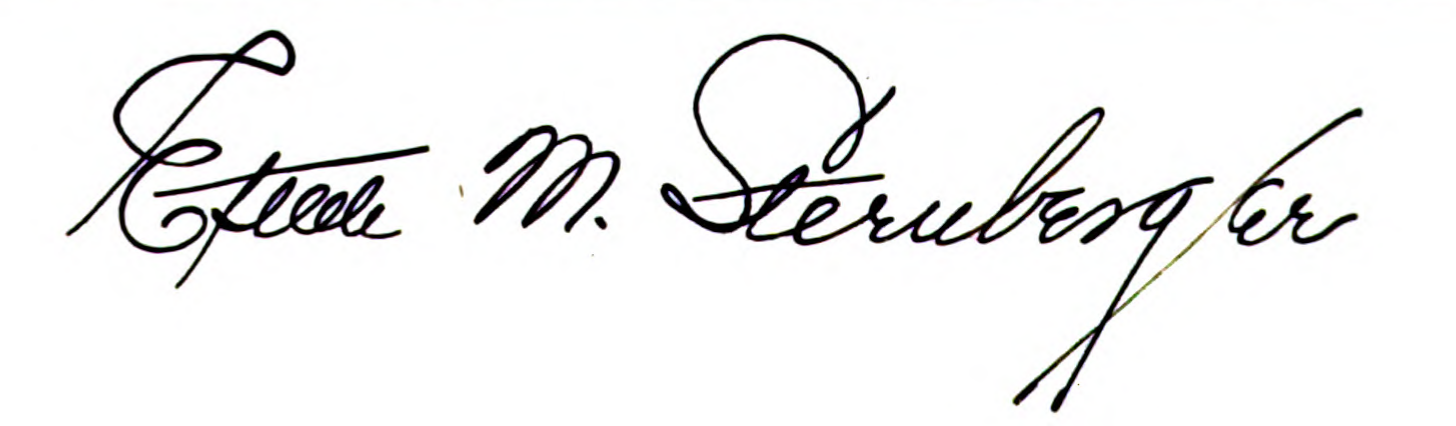

Estelle Miller Sternberger (1886–1971) was an American activist, writer and broadcaster. As executive secretary of the National Council of Jewish Women, she encouraged women to take up careers outside the home. She later became a popular radio personality, ready to discuss any topic related to politics or culture.

== Early life ==
On July 6, 1886, Sternberger was born as Estelle Miller in Cincinnati, Ohio. Sternberger's parents were Abraham Miller and Hannah née Greeble. Sternberger had a brother Milton Miller (b.1885) and a sister Sadie Miller (b.1893).

== Education ==
Sternberger attended the University of Cincinnati studying social work, and the Cincinnati School of Jewish Philanthropy.

== Career ==
After graduating, Sternberger began lecturing and joined civic organizations before becoming a member of the National Council of Jewish Women, NCJW.

In 1921, Sternberger became the founding editor of The Jewish Woman which was initially an internal newsletter of the NCJW. Over the years, it became an important source of inspiration for American Jewish women, promoting social initiatives and encouraging Jewish women to seek success in every field of endeavor.

In 1923, she participated in the First World Congress of Jewish Women in Vienna, representing the NCJW. Sternberger was an active proponent of world peace, heading the pacifist organization World Peaceways in the 1930s. In 1936, she published The Supreme Cause: A Practical Book About Peace.

Sternberger later became an outspoken radio commentator, broadcasting on religious New York City radio stations, including WLIB, WMCA and WQXR.

== Personal life ==
Sternberger's first husband was Harry Sternberger and they have a daughter Minette Cathryn Sternberger (1906–1977). Sternberger married the rabbi J. Max Weiss (died 1968).

On December 23, 1971, Sternberger died in New York City, New York.
