= Nathan Nathans =

Dutch trade unionist and labour leader

- Born: 7 December 1883; Arnhem, Netherlands
- Died: 28 July 1937 (aged 53) near Beert (near Brussels), Belgium
- Occupation: Trade unionist
- Known for: International Transport Workers' Federation

Nathan Nathans (7 December 1883 – 28 July 1937) was a Dutch trade unionist and international labour leader, associated with the International Transport Workers' Federation (ITF) and the Dutch Association of Railway and Tramway Personnel.

== Early life and career ==
Nathans was born in Arnhem and moved to Rotterdam in his youth, where he began working for the Hollandsche IJzeren Spoorweg-Maatschappij in 1900. The railway strikes of 1903 had a profound impact on him and led to his involvement in the labour movement, including clandestine activities for the railway workers’ union, where he became secretary of the Rotterdam section.

In 1910, Nathans was forced to choose between his job and his union activities. He chose to resign and subsequently became secretary of the railway workers’ union and editor of its publication, positions he held until 1922.

=== Trade union and international work ===
In 1922, Nathans was appointed second secretary of the International Transport Workers' Federation at its congress in Vienna, where he was responsible for the railway section. He later became deputy to the general secretary Edo Fimmen and, in 1930, was appointed adjunct general secretary.

Nathans played an important role in international labour cooperation, contributing to discussions on railway safety, labour organisation, and international solidarity. He was active in multiple countries, maintained contacts with labour movements across Europe, and participated in international congresses and committees. His work included supporting labour movements in countries facing political repression and contributing to international coordination during the interwar period.

=== Political activities ===
In addition to his union work, Nathans was active in politics as a member of the Social Democratic Workers' Party (SDAP). He served multiple terms as a municipal councillor in Hilversum and was involved in various committees, focusing on public order, policing, and municipal development.

He was also engaged in broader political movements within the socialist movement, including opposition currents and international solidarity efforts. Nathans was involved in activities opposing fascism and supported international causes such as aid efforts during the Spanish Civil War.

== Personal life ==
Nathans was the son of Samuel Nathans and Lise Kiek. He married Maria Egberta Kooijman in 1907; the marriage remained childless. He was known as a dedicated and modest individual who devoted his life to the labour movement and international solidarity.

=== Death ===
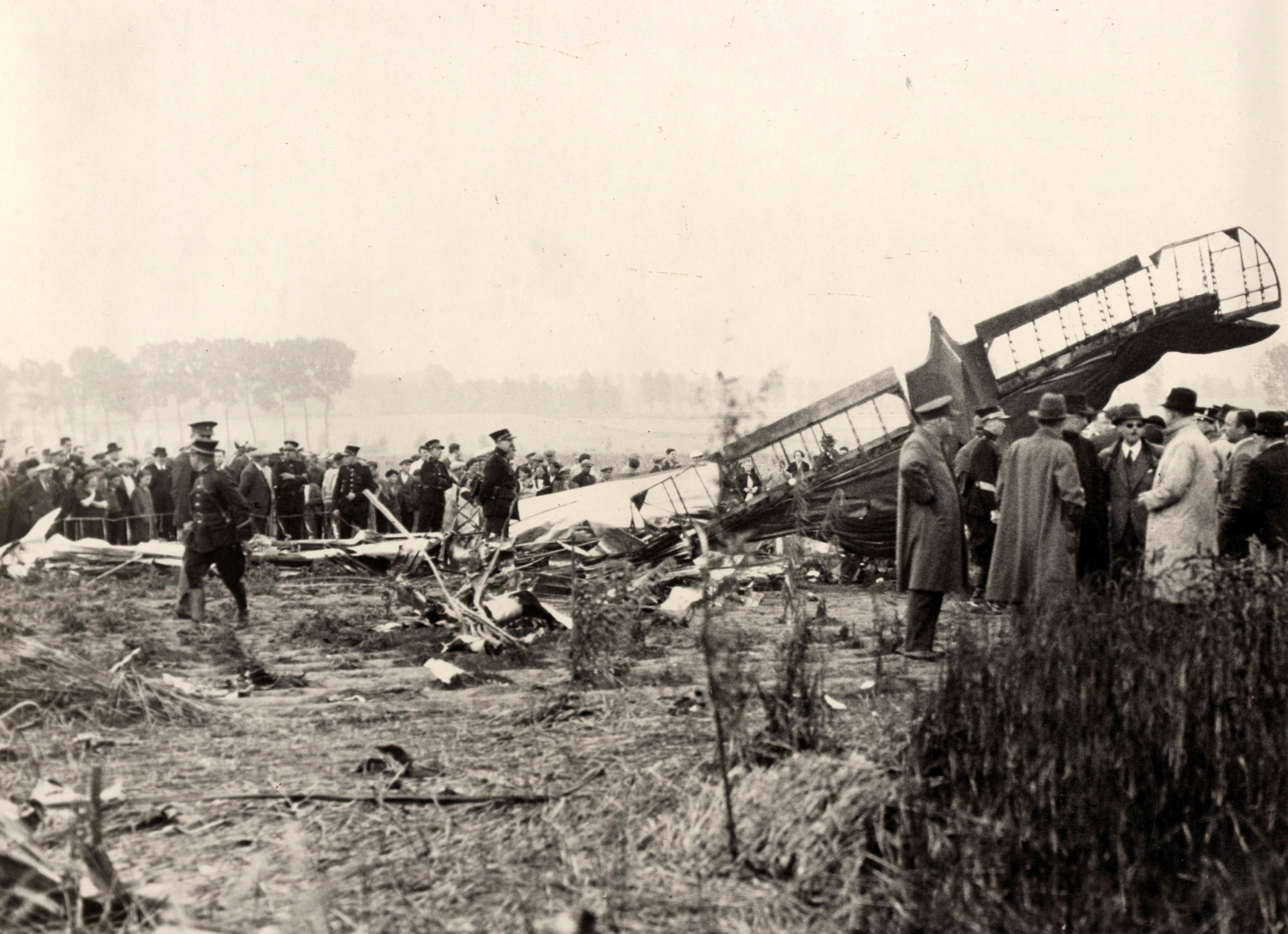
Disaster site of the 1937 Beert KLM Douglas DC-2 crash

Nathan died on 28 July 1937 in the 1937 Beert KLM Douglas DC-2 crash near Beert (near Brussels) while travelling to Paris to attend a meeting concerning the relocation of Spanish children during the Spanish Civil War. His death was widely mourned within the international labour movement. His funeral was held in the Concertgebouw in Amsterdam, where around two thousand people gathered in a solemn memorial attended by representatives of international and Dutch labour organizations.
