= Margit Oelsner-Baumatz =

- Born: 1938 (age 87–88); Wrocław, Germany
- Education: Seminario Rabinico Latinoamericano
- Occupations: psychologist, educator, rabbi, feminist
- Known for: rabbinical leadership, feminist activism in Judaism
- Spouse: Fredy Baumatz
- Children: 3

Margit Oelsner-Baumatz (born 1938) is a psychologist, educator, rabbi, and feminist. Born in Wrocław, Germany, the family emigrated to Argentina to escape the Nazi regime. Though Oelsner was not religiously observant in her youth, she enrolled in Seminario Rabinico Latinoamericano, graduating in 1994.

== Early years ==
Margit (nickname, "Margarita") Oelsner was born in Wrocław to Werner Oelsner, an electrical engineer, and Edith Chaskel. She described her father as "a German of Jewish descent, of course, who did not speak Hebrew, did not Passover and did not attend the synagogue". During the Second World War, her father wrote to several countries seeking a visa in order to escape the Nazi regime, and, as Argentina was the only one to offer it, the family made their way to Buenos Aires. Here, Margit became "Margarita", lived in Vicente López, and attended public school. She was not religiously observant as a young woman but, at age 14, her father decided she should receive religious education, which was sponsored by Lamroth Hakol, a Jewish community in Florida. A rabbi at Lamroth Hakol encouraged Oelsner to continue her studies. As her father did not want her to have a university education, she then joined B'nai B'rith.

== Career ==
Oelsner married Fredy Baumatz, an observant Jew, and had three children. She began studying Hebrew to help their daughters who attended a community school. Oelsner considered herself to be rebellious; she loved to study, was fascinated by challenges, and was a feminist at a time when few others were. Deciding she wanted to become a rabbi, she met with the Seminario Rabinico Latinoamericano's administrator and told him that she could not meet two of the requirements: she had no college degree and she could not go to Israel for a year. To fulfill the seminary's requirements, she studied psychology at university, and spent time in Israel. Though she has no pulpit, Oelsner can officiate at ceremonies outside the synagogue. She leads a group at Lamroth Hakol which organizes activities, meetings and conducts visits to the sick.

== Selected works ==
- 1996, Women's Participation in the Rabbinical Function in Latin America
