= Conservative Judaism outreach =

Proselytism by Conservative Judaism to attract Jews or non-Jews

Conservative Judaism outreach refers to those organizational and educational efforts by the Conservative Judaism (also known as "Masorti") meant to reach out and attract Jews and non-Jews, often the spouses and children in cases of Jewish intermarriage, to Judaism and to synagogue attendance.

== Youth movements ==
- Kadima, a youth group affiliated with the United Synagogue of Conservative Judaism (USCJ), specifically aimed at Jewish preteens living in North America in Grades 6–8.
- United Synagogue Youth (USY) is the youth movement of the United Synagogue of Conservative Judaism or USCJ with members from the United States and Canada dedicated to creating a fun, educational environment where Jewish teenagers can connect in hopes of meeting other Jewish teens in a comfortable atmosphere, combating assimilation, supporting Israel and giving and performing charity. The organization is open to all Jewish teenagers. While synagogue membership is not a requirement, most affiliate with the Conservative movement.

== Summer camps ==
There are a number of summer camps under the Conservative Judaism banner, the most important being Camp Ramah, which was founded in 1947, and its affiliates and namesakes: Camp Ramah in the Berkshires, Camp Ramah in California, Camp Ramah in New England, Camp Ramah in Canada, Ramah Darom, Camp Ramah in the Poconos, Camp Ramah (Wisconsin).

== Day schools ==
The Conservative movement has established a number of significant Jewish day schools, mostly using the "Solomon Schechter" name: Solomon Schechter School of Manhattan, Solomon Schechter Day School of Essex and Union, Metro Schechter Academy and others as well as schools such as Rochelle Zell Jewish High School, United Synagogue Day School, Hillel Day School and others.

== Outreach to LGBT Jews ==
- Keshet Rabbis is an organization of Conservative rabbis which holds that "LGBT Jews" should be embraced as full, open members of all affiliated congregations and institutions. Based on its understanding of Jewish sources and Jewish values, it asserts that gay, lesbian, bisexual and transgender Jews may fully participate in community life and achieve positions of professional and lay leadership.

== See also ==
- Reform Judaism outreach
- Orthodox Jewish outreach
- Baal teshuva movement
- Conversion to Judaism
- Repentance in Judaism
