= Camp Ramah =

Network of Jewish summer camps

- Interactive map of Camp Ramah
- Location: United States, Canada, and Israel
- Operated by: National Ramah Commission
- Established: 1947; 79 years ago
- Website: www.campramah.org

Camp Ramah (Hebrew: מחנה רמה) is a network of Jewish summer camps affiliated with the Conservative Movement. The camps operate in the United States, Canada, and Israel. All Ramah camps serve kosher food and are Shabbat-observant.

== History ==
During the 1940s, the Jewish Theological Seminary established Camp Ramah as a tool for furthering Jewish education. The founders, including Rabbi Ralph Simon of Chicago, envisioned an informal camp setting where Jewish youth would reconnect with the synagogue and Jewish tradition, and a new cadre of American-born Jewish leadership could be cultivated. The founders of Ramah camps were inspired by Camp Massad and Camp Cejwin.

The first camp opened in Conover, Wisconsin in 1947. The program was drawn up by Moshe Davis and Sylvia Ettenberg of the JTS Teachers' Institute. In October 2007, Ettenberg was awarded Pras Ramah (the Ramah Prize) as part of Ramah's 60th anniversary celebrations. Many of the early staff were ex-Camp Massad people and JTS students. In 1950, the second Ramah camp opened in the Poconos and in 1953, the third Ramah camp opened in Connecticut (this camp was later moved to Massachusetts).

In addition to typical summer camp activities, Ramah camps offer an educational program focusing on Judaism, Zionism, and Hebrew-language instruction on different levels. Camp Ramah offers sleep-away camps with an option to stay for either two, four, or eight weeks, day camps with busing, an Israel summer tour program for teenagers, a day camp in Jerusalem for American and Israeli children, and a variety of high school programs in Israel. In addition to its university-aged American counselors, specialists and educators, the staff of each camp is joined by a corps of emissaries from Israel known as the "mishlachat/מישלחת" (delegation).

== Educational impact ==
A Trinity College researcher, Ariella Keysar, documented a significant impact of Ramah on college students: She found that Ramah graduates were three times more likely to date only Jews, four times more likely to attend synagogue services, and three times as likely as the general Jewish population to spend significant time in Israel.

According to the Jewish Agency for Israel, Camp Ramah "is not just a camp, it’s a lifestyle." Among North American olim, one finds communities of former Americans who attended Camp Ramah and reconnected later in life. Many spiritual leaders, social justice advocates, educators, and community board members in North America trace their strong Jewish values and commitment to Judaism to their summers at Ramah. An educational initiative by Camp Ramah produced Siddur Lev Yisrael, one of the only Conservative siddurim without an English translation. This is done in support of Ramah's educational mission to emphasize and spread the use of Hebrew.

== Overnight camps ==
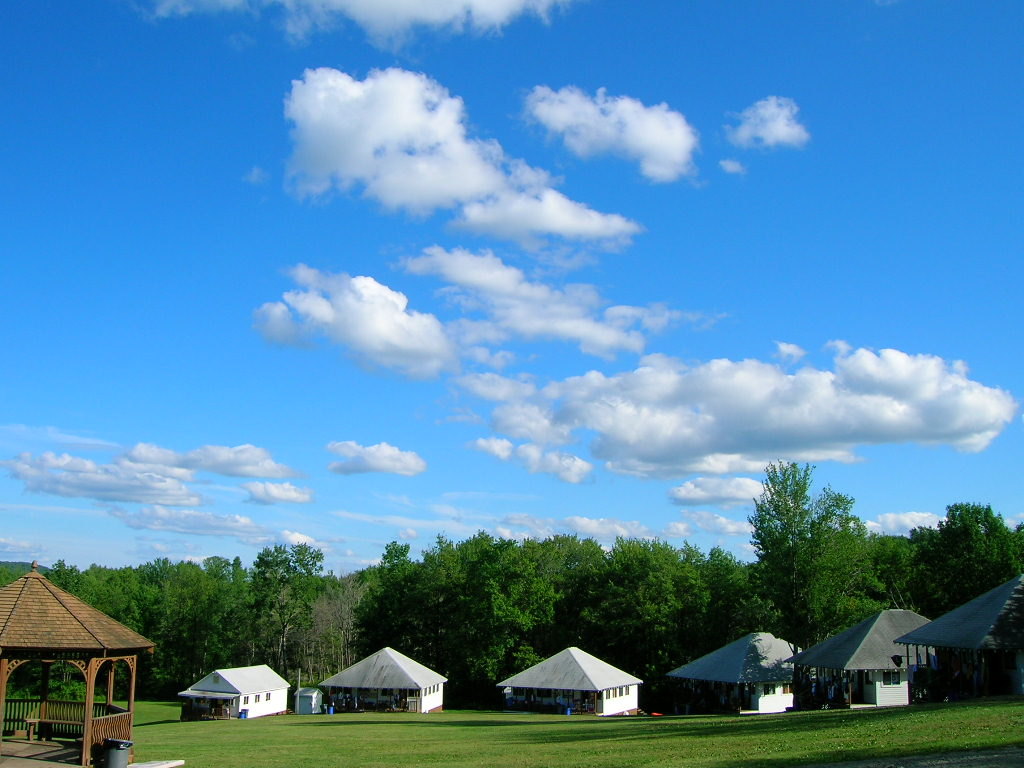
Camp Ramah in the Poconos

=== Camp Ramah in the Berkshires ===
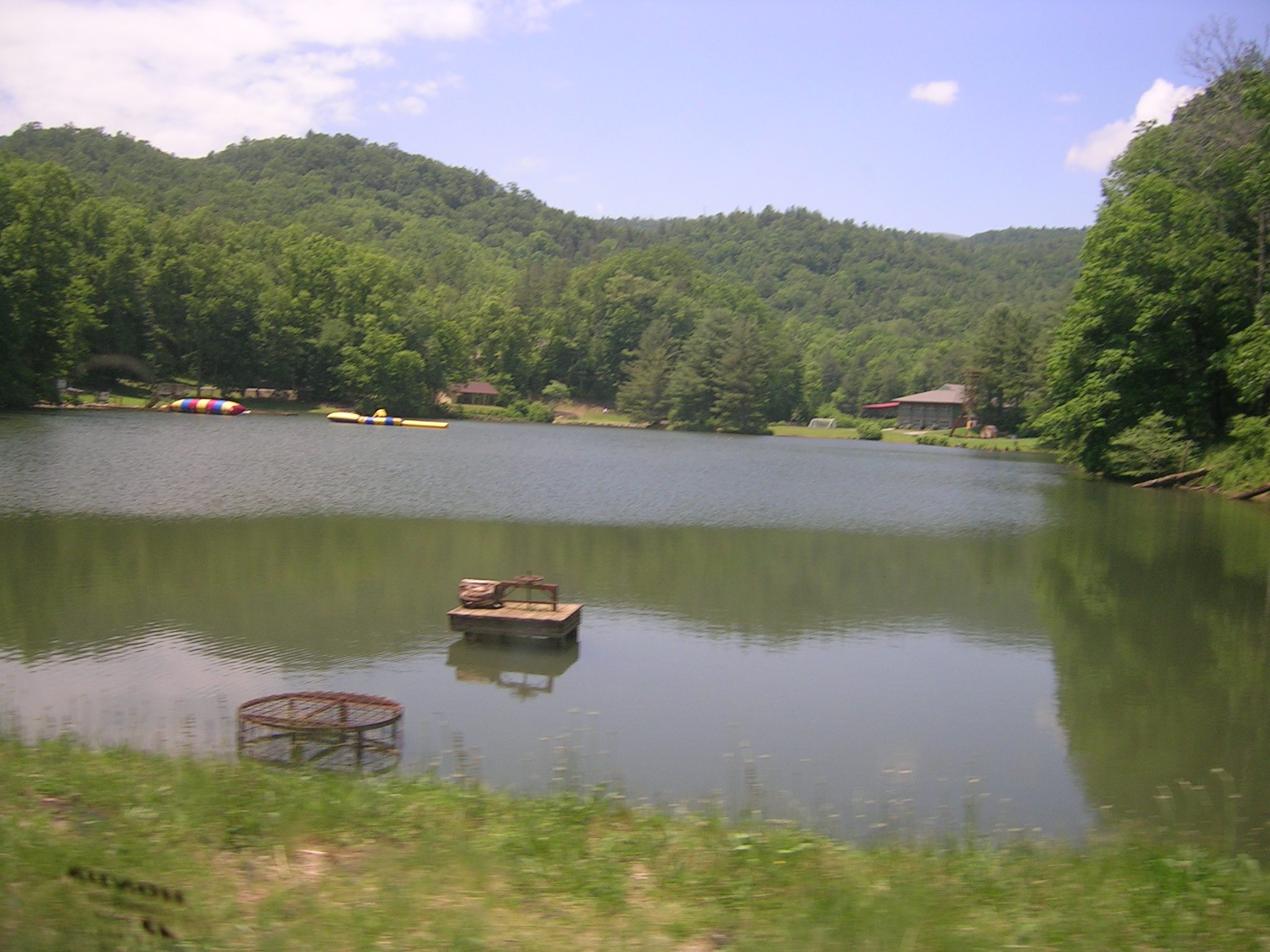
Camp Ramah Darom

Camp Ramah in the Berkshires (Wingdale, New York) is located on Lake Ellis, 90 minutes north of New York City by car. It opened in 1964 and serves the metropolitan New York/New Jersey area.

=== Camp Ramah in California ===
Camp Ramah in California (Ojai, California) is located in the mountains of Ojai, California, 90 minutes north of Los Angeles by car. It opened in 1956 and aims to serve California and much of the western United States.

=== Camp Ramah in Canada ===
Camp Ramah in Canada (Utterson, Ontario) is located in the Muskoka Region of Ontario, two hours north of Toronto, on Skeleton Lake. It opened in 1960 and serves Canada and parts of the northern United States.

=== Camp Ramah Darom ===
Camp Ramah Darom (Clayton, Georgia) is located in 122 acres (0.49 km^{2}) in the Appalachian Valley near Clayton, Georgia, 2 hours north of Atlanta. It opened in 1996 and serves the southern United States.

=== Camp Ramah in New England ===
Camp Ramah in New England (Palmer, Massachusetts), also known as Ramah Palmer, is located approximately 1½ hours west of Boston and 45 minutes east of Amherst and Northampton. It opened in 1953 as Camp Ramah Connecticut and serves the New England area as well as DC, Virginia, and parts of New York. Camp Ramah New England also operates the Ramah Day Camp of Greater Washington, DC, a day camp located in Germantown, MD.

=== Camp Ramah in Northern California ===
Camp Ramah in Northern California (Bay Area near San Francisco), also known as Ramah NorCal or Ramah Galim, opened in 2016. Ramah NorCal is a specialty camp with three tracks, ocean exploration, performing arts, and adventure sports. Camp Ramah in Northern California also hosts a Tikvah program for campers with disabilities.

=== Camp Ramah in the Poconos ===
Camp Ramah in the Poconos (Lakewood, Pennsylvania) is located in the mountain region of Wayne County in Northeastern Pennsylvania, three hours driving time from both New York City and Philadelphia. It opened in 1950 and serves parts of the northeast United States.

=== Ramah in the Rockies ===
Ramah in the Rockies (Sedalia, Colorado) is located in the Rocky Mountains, a 360-acre (1.5 km^{2}) camp site 1½–2 hours by car from Denver and Colorado Springs. Ramah Rockies opened in 2010 and is the first Ramah specialty camp, focusing its program on outdoors and environmental education, with a base camp covering 360 acres at 8,000 ft. elevation. In January 2018, BaMidbar Wilderness Therapy launched their 40-day-wilderness program for adults struggling with mental health.

=== Ramah Sports Academy ===
Ramah Sports Academy is located in Fairfield, Connecticut, on the campus of Fairfield University. The location offers campers top-level collegiate athletic fields and facilities including gymnasiums, an indoor pool, fitness and conditioning facilities, and more. RSA offers three two-week sessions over the course of the summer.

=== Camp Ramah in Wisconsin ===
Camp Ramah in Wisconsin (Conover, Wisconsin) is located in the lake region of Northern Wisconsin, 18 miles (29 km) north of Eagle River, 350 miles (560 km) from Chicago, and 240 miles (390 km) from Minneapolis, on the shores of Lake Buckatabon. It opened in 1947 and serves the Midwest United States.

== Day camps ==
=== Ramah Day Camp in Chicago ===
Ramah day camp in Chicago is located in Wheeling, Illinois, Cook County, Illinois, northwest of Chicago. It started in 2000 using the camp grounds purchased from Circle M Day Camp which opened in 1953.

=== Ramah Day Camp Greater D.C. ===
Ramah Day Camp Greater DC, which meets at the Wellspring Conference Center in Germantown, Maryland, offers a variety of programming. Ramah D.C. Day Camp is run by Camp Ramah New England.

=== Ramah Day Camp in Boston ===
Ramah Day Camp in Boston is located in Waltham, Massachusetts, in Middlesex County, Massachusetts, about a 30-minute drive from Boston. Camp lasts eight weeks and campers can enroll for any number of the weeks. Ramah Boston is hosted at Gann Academy in Waltham, and the campers swim at Bentley University’s Dana Center pool. Ramah Boston is run by Camp Ramah New England.

=== Ramah Day Camp in Nyack ===
Ramah Day Camp in Nyack is located in Nyack, New York, in Rockland County, New York, approximately 45 minutes by car from New York City. An eight-week day camp at which the staff remains overnight, though the campers, ages 5–14, go home every day. Activities for campers include basketball, soccer, hockey, tennis, a low ropes course, a full high ropes course including four rock climbing walls and a zip line, art, woodworking, ceramics, and cooking. A hot kosher lunch is provided daily to the campers, and the staff receive three meals per day. Staff members participate in an intensive program of Jewish learning, leadership development, and social engagement in the afternoons and evenings.

=== Ramah Day Camp in Philadelphia ===
Ramah day camp in Philadelphia is located in the Perelman Jewish Day School in Melrose Park, Pennsylvania. It shares a pool with the Jewish Federation Day Care Center and rents the Olympic-size pool of a nearby apartment complex. Activities include sports, swimming (twice a day – instructional and free), art, drama, nature, cooking, Judaic studies, music, and dance. Special events include Rick Recht concerts, Yom Yisrael (a carnival celebrating Israeli culture, history, and people), Maccabiah (color war), and Yom USA (July 3). Older campers go on overnights, while younger campers have 'undernights.' An arts festival is held at the end of the summer, combining drama, song, and dance.

=== Ramah Jerusalem Day Camp ===
The Ramah Jerusalem Day Camp is intended for English-speaking children from abroad and Israel entering kindergarten through eighth grade. The camp is located at the Israel Goldstein Youth Village in the San Simon neighborhood of Jerusalem, surrounded by a security fence. Once each week campers go on outings to tour Jerusalem and its surroundings. The other days campers are involved in fun educational activities on the Goldstein campus, including sports, arts and crafts, music, drama and swimming. Hebrew language is incorporated through activities and songs. Daily Tefillot (prayer services), "Oneg Shabbat" (a culmination of the week) and activities related to the summer theme create an environment of Masorti Jewish tradition that is an important element of all Ramah programs.

== Ramah programs in Israel ==
The Ramah movement’s Israel programs include Ramah Israel Seminar, Tichon Ramah Yerushalayim (TRY), Ramah Israel Institute, Ramah Jerusalem Camps and Ramah MITF (MASA Israel Teaching Fellows)

=== Ramah Israel Seminar ===
When campers age out of the Ramah summer camping experience at age 16, they can sign up for the Ramah Seminar in Israel. The six-week program is devoted to exploring the north, south, and center of the country. It is based at two principal sites: Havat HaNoar HaTzioni in Jerusalem, and the Hodayot youth village, adjacent to Kibbutz Lavi near the Sea of Galilee. The seminar includes an optional ten-day trip to Poland to learn about Jewish life in Eastern Europe before the Holocaust. In 2010, Ramah Israel Seminar offered a second optional program, "Yarok," (Green) focusing on the environment.

=== Tichon Ramah Yerushalayim (TRY) ===
Students in grades 10–12 may choose to come on a two-month track (USY High) or a four-month track (TRY) in the spring semester. The highlight of the program is the intensive Israel Core Course, an 18-credit-hour study of Israel from ancient times to the present, and which includes both fieldwork and engaging classwork. All studies are accredited by the Middle States Association of Colleges and Secondary Schools, with all AP courses certified through the College Board's AP Course Audit program.

== Tikvah special needs programs ==
Ramah in New England and in Northern California offers inclusion bunks for special-needs and mainstream youngsters, stand-alone bunks, and a vocational training program for older children and adults. There are bunks with entrances that can accommodate motorized scooters, barrier-free bathrooms, and paved roads suitable for wheelchairs.

== Program for bereaved children ==
Since 2003, the Friends of the Israel Defense Forces association has sponsored a summer camp program, Moreshet, for Israeli children who have lost a parent or sibling in a war or terrorist attack. The children spend the summer at Jewish sleep-away camps in the United States. In 2007, Camp Ramah in the Berkshires hosted 50 campers and staff members. The program continued in 2008, 2009, 2010 and 2016.

== Notable staff and alumni ==
- Max Bemis, singer/songwriter of the band Say Anything
- Ben Bernanke, Chairman of the U.S. Federal Reserve
- Wolf Blitzer, journalist
- Joel Chasnoff, stand-up comedian and author
- Michael Dell, founder and CEO, Dell Computers
- Ted Deutch, United States Congressman
- Glenn Fine, Inspector General of the U.S. Department of Justice
- Moshe Greenberg, rabbi, bible scholar, and professor
- Isaac Herzog, President of the State of Israel
- Michael Levin, paratrooper in the Israel Defense Forces; died during the 2006 Lebanon War after making aliyah, and regarded as a hero for his actions
- Caissie Levy, Canadian stage actress and singer (Wicked, Hair, Ghost, Rent, and Hairspray)
- David Lieber, rabbi and scholar
- Dahlia Lithwick, journalist
- Daniel Mann, actor
- Daniel C. Matt, Kabbalah scholar
- Debra Messing, film, television, and theatre actress
- Laura Miller, Mayor of Dallas, Texas
- Edwin Minden, Canadian judge
- Jerrold Nadler, U.S. Congressman
- B. J. Novak, actor, writer, comedian, director (The Office)
- Ben Platt, Tony Award-winning actor
- Jonah Platt, actor, advocate
- Marc E. Platt, film, television, and theatre producer
- Chaim Potok, Director of Ramah in California before embarking on career as a writer
- Rick Recht, Jewish-American rock musician
- Samuel Schafler, rabbi, historian, editor, and Jewish educator
- Steve Silberman, writer
- Ethan Slater, actor (SpongeBob SquarePants)
- Abby Stein, transgender reality star and activist, and Jewish educator
- Jake Tapper, journalist and author; previously with ABC, currently CNN
- Henry Waxman, U.S. congressman
- Bari Weiss, American journalist
