= Jewish outreach =

Proselytism by observant Jews

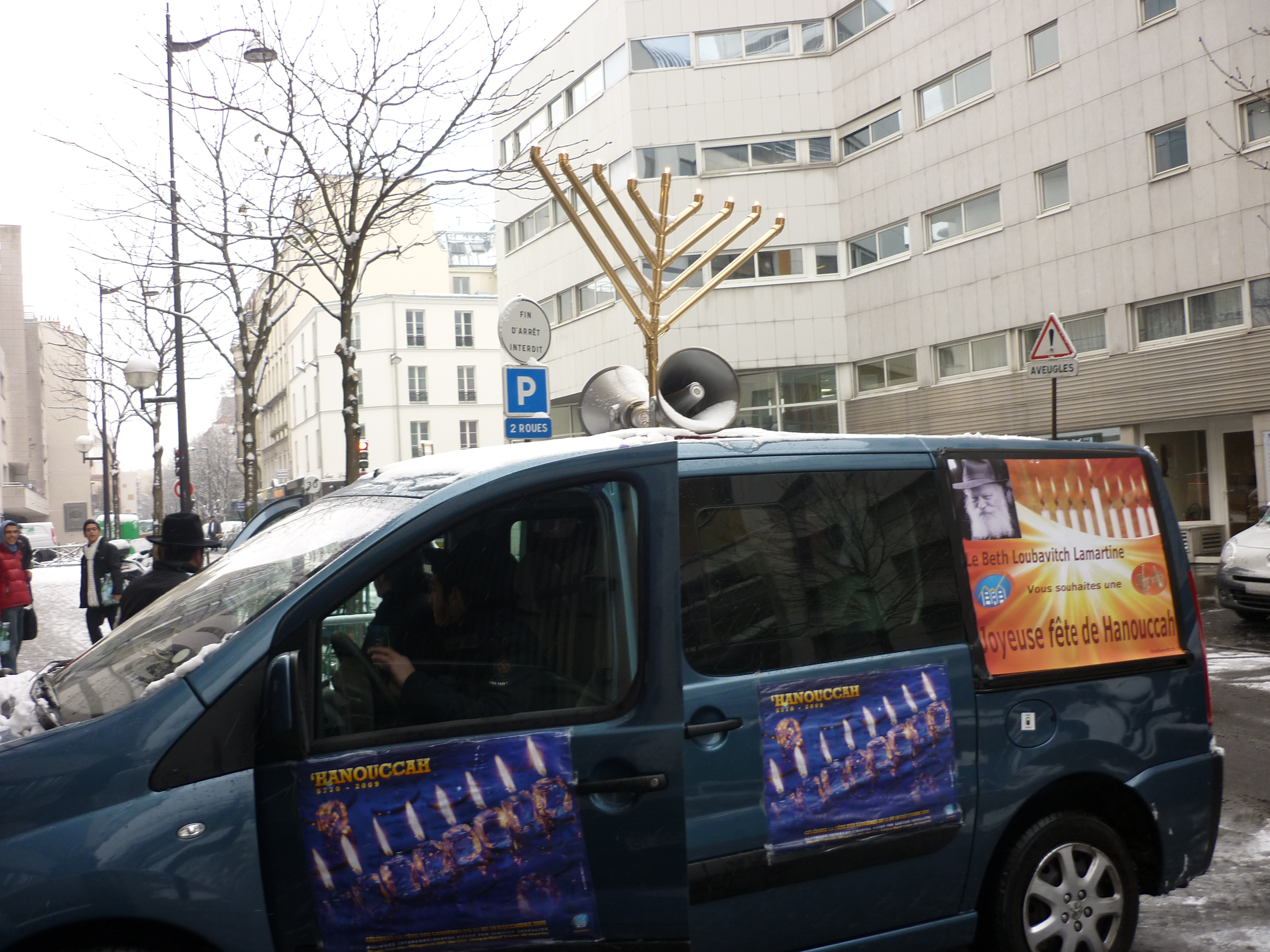
Local Chabad house drives around Paris to get French-Jewish people interested in Hanukkah services in December 2009

Jewish outreach (Hebrew: קירוב ליהדות) is a term sometimes used to translate the Hebrew word kiruv or keruv (literally, "to draw close" or "in-reach"). Outreach efforts are directed at Jews who are not in observance of Judaism's traditions and mitzvot or are not otherwise in touch with their Jewish identity. Normative Judaism very strongly discourages seeking converts to Judaism from other religions, although all denominations do accept those who follow through their conversion with a sincere commitment.

== Background and contemporary views ==
The idea of "Jewish outreach" has mixed support among Jews; some are against the concept, while others share a vision of a more accessible and inclusive Jewish community.

In the United States, a country with a mostly non-Orthodox or unaffiliated Jewish population and a 50% intermarriage rate, some Jewish federations and educational organizations provide an extensive range of offerings to the intermarried, to those who are marginally engaged with Jewish life, and to those who haven’t had any involvement in Judaism since attending Hebrew school or right after their bar mitzvah. "Chabad Lubavitch" was the first Orthodox Jewish organization in the United States to promote outreach means of recruiting unobservant Jews who commit to living an observant lifestyle.

Rabbi Dr. Shmuly Yanklowitz wrote that "outreach should enrich lives and society by making the Torah’s wisdom more broadly available. Further, outreach is not only about “one’s own” and we must bring people of different religions together in mutual understanding and respect by engaging in deep interfaith dialogue.

Rabbi Levi Brackman said, "with the high rate of assimilation and intermarriage in the West, I cannot imagine that there could be too many outreach workers in the field. The day that happens will be a blessed one. The battle against assimilation is far too important for its warriors to get embroiled in politics of this sort. Undoubtedly, all the outreach organizations, Chabad included, should put their differences aside and pool together all their resources and ideas to create an even brighter Jewish tomorrow."

== See also ==
- Anusim
  - Crypto-Judaism
  - Shavei Yisrael
  - Zera Yisrael
- Association for Jewish Outreach Programs
- Baal teshuva movement
- Conversion to Judaism
- Indoctrination
- Jewish fundamentalism
- Jews for Judaism
- Off the derech
- Outreach in Chabad Lubavitch
- Outreach in Conservative Judaism
- Outreach in Orthodox Judaism
- Outreach in Reform Judaism
- Musar movement
- Radicalization
- Scrupulosity
- Seven Laws of Noah
  - Ger toshav (resident alien)
  - Noahidism
