= Samuel Schafler =

American historian (1929–1991)

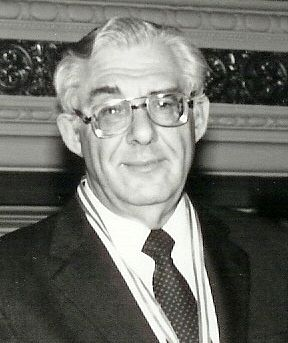
- Samuel Schafler
- Born: February 20, 1929; New York City, U.S.
- Died: April 3, 1991 (aged 62); Boston, Massachusetts, U.S.
- Spouse: Sara Schafler

Samuel Schafler (February 20, 1929 – April 3, 1991) was a New York-born rabbi, historian, editor and Jewish educator. He was Superintendent of the Board of Jewish Education of Metropolitan Chicago and President of Hebrew College in Brookline, Massachusetts.

== Biography ==
Samuel (Shmuel) Schafler was born in the Bronx, New York in 1929. His father, Benjamin Schafler, and mother, Ethel (née Schnapp) owned a grocery store. Schafler grew up in Brooklyn, New York. He had one sister, Pearl. Schafler studied at the Yeshiva of Flatbush, the Talmudical Academy and the Teachers Institute of Yeshiva University. In 1951, he married Sara (née Edell) of Toronto, then a student at the Teachers Institute of the Jewish Theological Seminary of America in New York, where Schafler was studying for the rabbinate. They had six children.

In 1950, Schafler graduated with honors from the City College of New York, where he was awarded the Cromwell Medal and the Nelson P. Mead Prize in History. Schafler was ordained as a Conservative rabbi in 1952. He pursued graduate work in Jewish history and education at Columbia University.

== Rabbinic career ==
In 1952–1955, Schafler was rabbi of Knesseth Israel Synagogue in Gloversville, New York. From 1955 to 1961, he was editor of two magazines, The Synagogue School and Dorenu: Our Age, and the associate editor of The Pedagogic Reporter. He also served as associate director of the United Synagogue Commission on Jewish Education and director of its Educational Placement Service.

In 1961–1976, he was rabbi of Temple Gates of Prayer in Flushing, New York. During that time, he was active in the Flushing community and served as a Fellow in Community Planning for the Board of Jewish Education of New York. He was the educational director of Camp Ramah in the Berkshires in 1964–1966, Camp Ramah in Glen Spey, New York in 1967, and the Ramah Community Program in Israel from 1968 to 1976.

== Jewish education ==
As Superintendent of the Chicago Board of Jewish Education from 1976 to 1987, he preached the need for Ahavat Yisrael, love of Jews for one another. He defined Ahavat Yisrael as "learning to love and respect Jews as they are, and not as you would like them to be." The historic sin of the American Jewish education profession, he charged, was its indifference to its own history. One of the failures of American Jewish education was its ignorance of the achievements of its pioneers and inability to chronicle its own successes. Schafler was a believer in the study of texts and felt that cultural dissonance was a necessary factor in Jewish education, allowing for the expression of varying passions and commitments within Judaism.

== Academic positions ==
In 1969, Schafler was a visiting professor at the Melton Center of Jewish Education at the Hebrew University of Jerusalem. In 1973, he was awarded a doctorate in Jewish history from the Jewish Theological Seminary for his dissertation on "The Hasmoneans in Jewish Historiography." In 1974–1976, while serving as a rabbi in Flushing, Schafler was an assistant professor of Jewish History at Queens College, City University of New York. In 1982, the Jewish Theological Seminary awarded him a Doctor of Divinity, honoris causa.

In 1987, Schafler was elected president of Hebrew College in Boston. He was the first pulpit rabbi to become president of a New England college. He served in that position until his death from cancer in 1991.

== Publications ==
- "Teaching Conservative Judaism and the Jewish Family" Conservative Judaism, Fall 1979
- "Observations on the History of Jewish Education in the United States" Jewish Education, New York, Fall 1981
- "Modern Zionism - An Historic Perspective" Judaism: A Quarterly of Jewish Life and Thought, Winter 1981
- "The Jewish Family: Perception and Realities - Can They Be Changed?" Journal of Jewish Communal Service, New York, 1983
- "Enemies or Jew Hater? Reflections on the History of Anti-semitism," Judaism, New York, Summer 1988
- "God and the Jewish School," Jewish Education, New York, Spring 1989
- "Lovers of Zion in Japan," Congress Monthly, February 1990
- "Books Received," Jewish Education, New York, Spring-Summer 1991
- "Eichmann in My Hands," book review, Hadassah Magazine, October 1990
- Guide for a Synagogue Religious Committee The United Synagogue of Conservative Judaism
