= Westdale Secondary School =

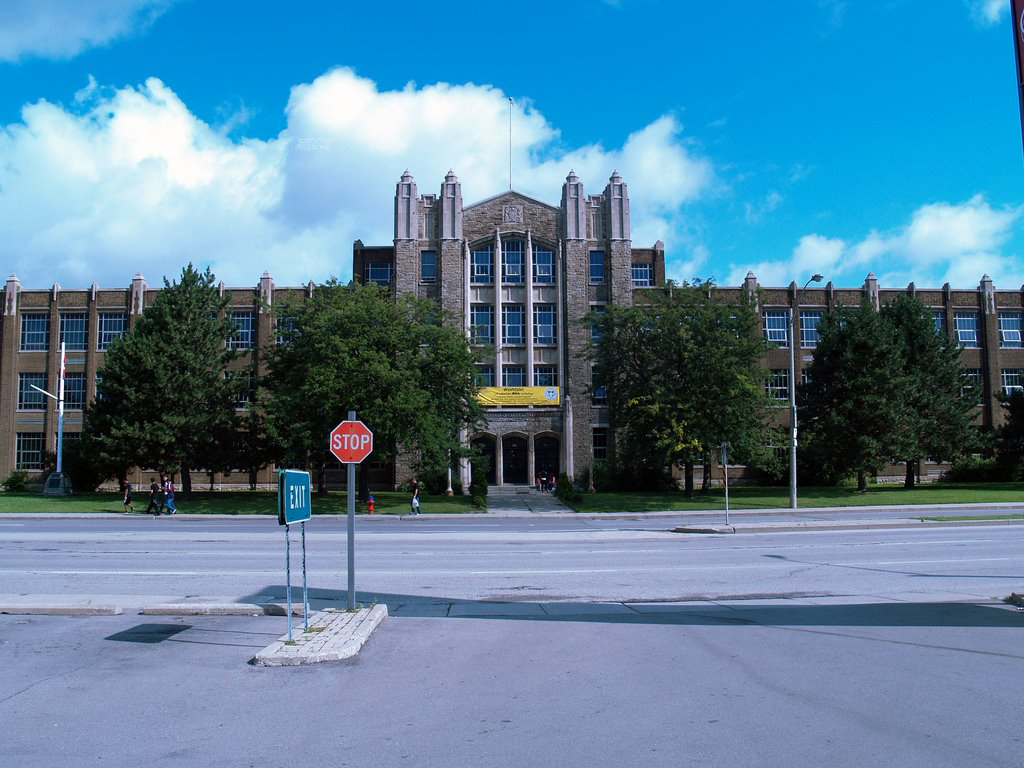

Location
- 700 Main Street West; Hamilton, Ontario, L8S 1A5; Canada; 43.2601°N 79.9015°W

Information
- School type: High school
- Motto: Alius Alia Via Ad Astra Ascendit ('Each Reach for the Stars in Their Own Way')
- Founded: 1931
- Principal: Brian Goodram
- Grades: 9–12
- Colours: Green and gold
- Mascot: The Westdale Warrior
- Newspaper: The Sequitur
- Website: hwdsb.on.ca/westdale/
- Last updated: 30 November 2020

Westdale Secondary School is a public high school founded in 1931 in Hamilton, Ontario, Canada. It is a school in the city of Hamilton and is located in Westdale Village, a suburb in the west-end of the city. It is administered by the Hamilton-Wentworth District School Board. Westdale is also the most populated public high school in Hamilton, Ontario.

== History ==
Westdale was founded as a collegiate school—housing three collegiates under one roof—and was, at a time, the largest school of its kind in the British Commonwealth. The original building was referred to as "Westdale Composite School", or "Westdale Tripartite School", because it housed three separate schools. The collegiate, technical and commercial schools were housed on the left, middle, and right side of the school, with the cafeteria on the fourth floor (the cafeteria has since moved to the first floor). The architects Prack and Prack designed the building with arched doorways and pseudo-buttresses of the "school gothic" architectural style. Constructed by J.M. Pigott Construction Company at an initial cost of $1,306,521 (including 4.7 hectares of land), the school has undergone four major renovations, which occurred in 1959, 1974, 1975 and 2018 (currently underway). Westdale Secondary school has also become an IB school as of 2008.

== Charity activities ==
Westdale regularly participates in and plays host to numerous fundraisers and awareness rallies. Each year the students organise such events as Keep the Beat, Coffee House, and the 30 Hour Famine. In 2005, Westdale students were part of the effort to keep the Victoria Cross of Frederick George Topham in Canada.

== Extra curriculars ==
=== Sports ===
Westdale has a variety of sports teams and clubs; football, basketball, soccer and volleyball which are all hosted at the school.

=== Music ===
Westdale has many music groups, including the Jr. Band, Sr. Band, Marching Band, Orchestra, Chamber Orchestra, Jr. Jazz, Sr. Jazz, and the Choir. The music department at Westdale competes regularly in local and international music festivals and competitions. In recent years, the music department has consistently won a variety of awards in the Golden Horseshoe Music Festival, which is hosted from Redeemer University College in Hamilton, Ontario.

=== Specialist High Skills Major ===
The Specialist High Skills Major Program (SHSM) is a ministry-approved program which allows students to focus their skills in specific areas of interest as they earn their Ontario Secondary Diploma. Westdale Secondary School students have the option to complete their Specialist High Skills Major in either the Arts & Culture, Construction, Health & Wellness and Information and Communications Technology.

=== The Sequitur ===
The Sequitur is Westdale's student-run school newspaper, and is one of two school newspapers in Hamilton. There are monthly publications of The Sequitur, where there are paper and digital copies available.

== Notable alumni ==
- Maija Blaubergs (1947–2010), feminist scholar, educational psychologist, lawyer
- Len Blum, a Hollywood writer and husband of Heather Munroe-Blum
- David Braley, (1941–2020), CFL, previous owner of the B.C. Lions and owned Orlick Industries in Hamilton.
- Nick Cordero, (1978–2020), Canadian actor
- Jeremy Fisher, (1976– ), is a professional singer.
- Diego Fuentes, (1970-), is an actor.
- Daniel Goldberg, producer of films such as Space Jam and Road Trip.
- Eleanor Harvey, (1995-), foil fencer
- Harry Howell, (1932–2019), Hockey Hall-of-Famer, longtime star for the New York Rangers of the National Hockey League.
- Russ Jackson, (1936– ), CFL Hall-of-Fame football player.
- Frank Kerr (1956–2008) (more commonly known as Frankie Venom) was the lead singer of Teenage Head
- Caissie Levy, is a Broadway actress who played a lead in Ghost the Musical, Penny in Hairspray, Sheila in Hair and will star in the Broadway revival of Les Misérables.
- Eugene Levy, (1946– ), is a Canadian Emmy- and Grammy Award-winning actor, television director, producer, musician and writer.
- Edwin B. Minden is a Canadian judge who sits on the Superior Court of Justice.
- Raymond Moriyama, (1929–2023), architect whose work includes the Ontario Science Centre and Brock University's Mackenzie Chown Complex.
- John Munro, (1931–2003), was a Canadian politician. Hamilton's John C. Munro International Airport is named after him.
- Rupinder Nagra, (1970-), is an actor.
- Osvald Nitski, (1997-), is a swimmer, poet, and Artificial Intelligence engineer.
- Diana Panton, (– ), is a jazz singer and Juno Award winner. Panton is both an alumna and a teacher at Westdale.
- Alex Pierson, (1971-), is a news broadcaster.
- John Lawrence Reynolds (1939–), novelist and non-fiction writer, twice winner of the Arthur Ellis Award
- Gord Lewis, founding guitarist of the band Teenage Head
- Nathan Rogers, (1979 – ), is a singer, songwriter, and performer.
- Myron Scholes, (1941– ), is a Nobel Laureate in Economics, 1997. He is currently affiliated with Stanford University.
- Martin Short, (1950– ), is an Emmy Award-nominated Canadian-American comedian, actor, screenwriter, singer and producer.
- Steve Staios, (1973– ), is a Canadian professional NHL hockey player and member of the Edmonton Oilers.
- Tim St. Pierre (1986– ) is a Canadian football player.
- Shona Thorburn, (1982– ), is a professional basketball player, a point guard for the Seattle Storm of the WNBA.
- Brian Williams, (1946– ), is a Canadian sportscaster who is best known for his coverage of the Olympic Games.
- Jim Young, (1943– ), is a former professional American football and Canadian football player.
- Eric Cheng 鄭啟泰 (1967–2024) TVB actor and Hong Kong DJ.
