= Orthodox Judaism outreach (disambiguation) =

Orthodox Judaism outreach commonly referred to as Kiruv or Keruv, is the movement of Orthodox Judaism that reaches out to non-Orthodox Jews to practice the Mitzvot in the hope that they will live according to Orthodox Jewish law.

Orthodox Judaism outreach may also refer to:

- Jewish outreach
- Noahide Campaign
