= Eliyahu Essas =

Soviet-Israeli dissident and rabbi

Rabbi Eliyahu Essas
- אליהו אסאס
- Born: Ilya Tsvievich Essas; 1946 (age 79–80); Vilnius, USSR
- Occupations: Teacher and author
- Employer: Aish Hatorah
- Title: Rabbi
- Spouse: Anya
- Children: Joseph; Esther; David
- Parent(s): Tzvi & Sonya Essas

Rabbi Eliyahu Essas (Hebrew: אליהו אסאס, Russian: Илья Цвиевич Эссас, Ilya Tsvievich Essas; born 1946) is a former leader of Soviet Jewry and one of the founders of Baal Teshuva movement in the Soviet Union. He lives in Jerusalem. Essas became interested in Human Rights and Jewish cause, while studying Mathematics in Vilnius University.

== Refusenik ==
In 1973 he applied to the Soviet authorities to make Aliyah to Israel. He was refused on the grounds of his wife having a security sensitive job.

While living in Moscow, Essas spent his time building an Orthodox Jewish Community. He created a network of Torah studies, children underground education and summer camps.

In January 1986, after political deals between Edgar Bronfman, Chairman of the World Jewish Congress, and the Soviet authorities, Essas' family moved to Israel.

== Later activity ==
In 1988, Essas stood for election to the Knesset with the Degel HaTorah party.

Since 1999, Rabbi Essas works for Aish Hatorah in Jerusalem and is a founder of the Jewish Russian website evrey.com

== Bibliography ==
- Zakon, Miriam Stark, Silent Revolution - Story of Rabbi Eliyahu Essas and Russian Torah Network (Artscroll/Mesorah, 1992) ISBN 0-89906-105-2
- Learn Torah, Love Torah, Live Torah: Harav Mordechai Pinchos Teitz, the Quintessential Rabbi, by Rivkah Teitz Blau, Chap. 13 (Ktav 2001)
