= Circle M =

Circle M Day Camp was a private, coeducational summer day camp for boys and girls located in Wheeling, Illinois, a northwest suburb of Chicago.

Founded in 1953 by Marcy and Bob Brower, the camp operated for forty-six seasons until 1998, when the Browers retired. The camp was an early example of voluntary desegregation in private American summer camping, having hired African-American staff and enrolled minority campers from Cabrini–Green and Evanston beginning in the 1960s.

== History ==
=== Early history ===
Circle M Day Camp was established in 1953 in Wheeling, Illinois by Marcy Brower (née Gordon) and Robert "Bob" Brower, both Roosevelt University graduates who had begun their careers as Chicago-area schoolteachers. The camp's grounds, on West Hintz Road, occupied a wooded tract on what was then the northwest edge of the Chicago suburbs. By 1964, the eight-week, coed program was enrolling approximately 244 children drawn primarily from the surrounding suburbs, and it continued to annually serve almost 300 children, staffed by about 50 counselors and activity staff, until Circle M closed in 1998.

Bob Brower also worked as a teacher, principal, and administrator in Elk Grove School District 59. Marcy Brower also taught elementary school in Chicago and Wheeling.

=== Desegregating Camp ===
The Browers, who had been active in the civil rights movement, set out to integrate Circle M Day Camp after Marcy Brower attended the 1963 March on Washington and following the passage of the Civil Rights Act of 1964 on July 2, 1964. The camp discontinued its BB gun rifle program, hired African-American staff, and in 1965 launched a pilot in which eight children from the Cabrini–Green public housing project in Chicago lived with white suburban host families during the week and attended Circle M on campership at no charge. The host-family program ran through the summer of 1967 and was halted following the assassination of Martin Luther King Jr. in April 1968.

After 1968, the Browers redesigned the program with assistance from African-American leaders involved in the Evanston school-desegregation effort, recruiting campers aged five to seven who could be picked up on regular bus routes alongside suburban campers. Families paid roughly one-third of the regular camp fee, with the balance and the transportation costs absorbed by Circle M. The revised plan eventually enrolled about twenty children per season and continued for thirty-five years until the camp closed. The Browers also lobbied within the American Camp Association (ACA) to adopt a non-discriminatory enrollment and employment policy. The effort resulted in the adoption of what became the association's standing equal-opportunity practice.

In addition to the scholarship program, the Browers used the campgrounds to host folk music concerts raising funds for civil rights organizations and labor unions.

=== Recognitions ===
In 1979, the ACA's Eleanor P. Eells visited Circle M Day Camp and nominated the camp's scholarship program for the Eleanor P. Eells Award for Program Excellence, which Circle M received that year.

In 1993, the Browers helped co-found the Mid-States Camping Conference, a regional gathering of camp professionals affiliated with the ACA.

The ACA Illinois Distinguished Service Award was given to Marcy Brower in 1996 and to Bob Brower in 1997.

The ACA National Service Award was given to Bob Brower in 1998 and to Marcy Brower in 2005.

In 2009, the SCOPE Midwest Lifetime Achievement Award was given to Circle M Day Camp.

In 2012, the Browers' article, Desegregating Circle M Day Camp: A Determination to Succeed" was awarded the ACA National's Golden Quill Award.

ACA Illinois named two awards after the Browers:

The Marcy and Bob Brower Award for Innovation and Intentional Professional Development, "given...to a person, camp, organization, or group that demonstrates commitment and intention for creating or implementing innovative professional development."

The Marcy and Bob Brower Campership Fund. "As owners/directors of Circle M Day Camp and leaders in the camping community, Marcy and Bob continuously worked towards bettering the world through camp. Using social justice efforts, they influenced and created change within ACA and the camping world."

=== Closure ===
The Browers retired in 1998 after forty-five seasons and sold the camp. Beginning in the summer of 1999, the grounds were rented by the Jewish Theological Seminary–affiliated Camp Ramah Day Camp, which fully acquired the property in 2000 and continues to operate at 98 West Hintz Road. Marcy Brower died in April 2020 at age 91; Bob Brower died in December 2022 at age 95. The ACA's Illinois Section administers the Marcy and Bob Brower Campership Fund in their memory, providing scholarships for children to attend summer camp.
