= Baal teshuva =

Jew who returns to or adopts Orthodox Judaism

In Judaism, a ba'al teshuvah (Hebrew: בעל תשובה; for a woman, בעלת תשובה, ba'alat teshuva or ba'alas teshuva; plural, בעלי תשובה, ba'alei teshuva, 'owner of return [to God or his way]') is a Jew who adopts some form of traditional religious observance after having previously followed a secular lifestyle or a less frum (religiously observant) form of Judaism.

The baal teshuva movement is a description of the return of secular Jews to religious Judaism. The term is used to refer to a worldwide phenomenon among the Jewish people.

== Definition ==
The phrase baal teshuva generally refers to a Jew from a non-Orthodox background who becomes religiously observant in an Orthodox fashion; however, the concept can also encompass Orthodox-leaning Jews who become stricter in their observance.

The term baal teshuva is from the Talmud and means "master of repentance". In Israel, chozer b'teshuvah (חוזר בתשובה; plural: chozrim b’teshuvah), meaning "returning to return" or "returning to repentance" is more commonly used. Hence, a baal teshuva is a Jew who transgressed the halakhah (Jewish law) knowingly or unknowingly, but has completed a process of introspection to "return" to the full observance of God's mitzvot.

== Interpretation ==
According to Maimonides's Mishneh Torah a ba'al teshuvah stands higher in shamayim (lit. 'heaven') than a "frum from birth", even higher than a tzadik.

This is supported by Rabbi Abbahu's statement that "In the place where penitents stand, even the full-fledged righteous do not stand"

== History ==
=== In the United States ===
The baal teshuva movement began to appear as an identifiable movement in the United States in the 1960s, as a growing number of young Jews raised in non-religious homes in the United States started to develop a strong interest in becoming a part of observant Judaism; many of these people, in contrast to sociological expectations, became attracted to observant Judaism within Orthodoxy.

The Baal teshuva movement was also inspired by the sixties and seventies counterculture, especially the counterculture of the 1960s and the Hippie movement (Rabbi Shlomo Carlebach tried to channel the counterculture and its music into a Jewish direction through his music and teachings), the Woodstock Festival, the drug subculture, the new interest in Eastern religions (Rabbi Aryeh Kaplan tried to channel that interest into a Jewish direction through his writings) and the spirit of youth rebellion that pervaded US high schools and college campuses. It was in recognition of this phenomenon and in response to it that the earliest emissaries of the Lubavitcher Rebbe, Rabbi Menachem Mendel Schneerson, went out to connect with these people and "recruit" them to Judaism.

According to Rabbi Yosef Blau the mashgiach ruchani of Yeshiva University:

A baal teshuva movement has emerged with a significant number of Jews from non-traditional homes returning to the observance of grandparents and great grandparents. In fact one of the challenges facing modern Orthodoxy is that many of these returnees are attracted to a European Orthodoxy.

Whereas early Baal teshuva trends were partly related to the prevailing anti-establishment atmosphere of the 1960s, an increase in Jewish pride in the wake of Israel's victory in 1967's Six-Day War fueled and gave momentum to the beginnings of the baal teshuva movement."

Although the effects of the Holocaust and the sway of the counterculture movement led many to abandon their religious upbringing, others were willing to experiment with alternate liberated lifestyles, and as part of this experimentation it was intriguing to them to explore Jewish Sabbath observance, intensive prayer, and deeper Torah and Talmud study. Many of these people adopted a fully Orthodox Jewish way of life, and although some eventually dropped out entirely or found their path within Conservative Judaism or other streams of Judaism, or even joined other faiths, others chose to remain with Orthodoxy:

... in the 1970s. Orthodoxy began a remarkable revival, spurred on by the missionizing done by the Baal Teshuva movement among other Jews. Lubavitch (also called Chabad) sent emissaries to hundreds of Jewish communities around the country and the world. Among the non-Orthodox, the Reform movement grew, which was due in large measure to the joining of many intermarried couples.

In 1986, New York magazine reported:

The people making this sweeping change in their life grew up in a secular world. They went to good colleges and got excellent jobs. They didn't become Orthodox because they were afraid, or because they needed a militaristic set of commands for living their lives. They chose Orthodoxy because it satisfied their need for intellectual stimulation and emotional security.

=== In the former Soviet Union ===
The baal teshuva movement also appeared in the former Soviet Union, which at that time had almost completely secularized its Jewish population. The rise of Jewish pride came in response to the growth of the State of Israel, in reaction to the USSR's pro-Arab and anti-Zionist policies, and in reaction to USSR's antisemitism.

The Israeli victory in the Six-Day War in 1967 ignited the pride of Jews in the Soviet Union, particularly in Russia. Suddenly there were hundreds of thousands of Jews wanting to go to Israel, although they dared not express their desire too openly. Several thousand applied for exit visas to Israel and were instantly ostracized by government organizations including the KGB. Many hundreds became refuseniks (otkazniks in Russian), willing to suffer jail time to demonstrate their new-found longing for Zion. In the middle of this, there arose a new interest in learning about and practicing Judaism, an urge that the Communist government had long attempted to stamp out.

Many Russian Jews began to study any Jewish texts they could lay their hands on. Foreign rabbis, often young students in Chabad Yeshivot, came on visits in order to teach how to learn Torah and how to observe Jewish law. Jewish ritual objects, such as tefillin, mezuzot, siddurim, and even matzah, were also smuggled into Russia. With the fall of the Communist regime, there is now a rich resource of Russian religious texts that flourishes and caters to Russian Jews living in Russia, America, and Israel.

The return-to-Judaism movement was a spontaneous grassroots movement from the ground up and was part of the refusenik movement; it came as a great surprise to the Soviet authorities, and even to the Jewish community outside the USSR and it eventually contributed to Aliyah from the Soviet Union and post-Soviet states and the collapse of the Soviet Union and emigration to Israel. Young leaders included Yosef Mendelevich, Eliyahu Essas (who eventually became a rabbi), Herman Branover, and Yitzchok Kogan, who all later moved to Israel and are now actively teaching other Russian emigres in Israel, aside from Kogan, who leads a community in Moscow.

=== In Israel ===
During the 1960s there was a movement among secular Israeli Jews that was essentially a search for spirituality. At the time, most Israeli parents were secular Zionists. While some Jews were hostile to traditional Judaism, a spiritual quest in the 1960s and 1970s caused some Israelis to seek answers in Jewish tradition.

Rabbi Aharon Feldman observes that:

Decades of indoctrination by the secular school systems and the media in Israel have failed to have any effect on the sense of identity which most Jews feel with Judaism—as recent surveys have shown. The masses have become aware of the emptiness—and the terror—of a purposeless, consumerist culture. As a result, among the grassroots levels there is a deep yearning for spiritual values. This yearning has taken on massive proportions as expressed in the baal teshuva movement. The secret is out that Jews believe in God and that they have a Torah.

In Israel, special schools developed for the newly-religious, who came to be called "Baalei teshuva" (m. plural), "Baal teshuva" (m. singular), a "Baalat teshuva" refers to a female, and "chozeret biteshuva" in Hebrew. Schools were established dedicated to the intensive study of Torah specially designed for the newly religious students who wanted to devote time to intensive study of classical texts with the ancient rabbinic commentaries. These schools opened in the early 1970s, mainly based in Jerusalem. Two significant institutions have been the Aish HaTorah ("fire of Torah") Yeshiva headed by Rabbi Noach Weinberg, and the Ohr Somayach Yeshiva headed by Rabbis Nota Schiller and Mendel Weinbach. Both of these rabbis had degrees from American universities and were able to speak to the modern mind-set. See also Diaspora Yeshiva, Machon Meir.

Chabad Hasidism, with many Chabad houses throughout Israel, and yeshiva programs for Israelis, Russians, French, and Americans, reach out to thousands. Followers of Chabad can be seen attending tefillin booths at the Western Wall and Ben Gurion International Airport as well as other public places, and distributing Shabbat candles on Fridays. There are also Chabad houses in almost every location that Jews might be located, whether as permanent residents, on business, or tourists.

Among Sephardi and Mizrahi Jews, Rabbi Amnon Yitzhak and Rabbi Reuven Elbaz are considered the leaders of the baal teshuva movement in Israel.

== Challenges, critiques and difficulties ==
As with all social movements, there is controversy and criticism. Early twenty-first century researchers have debated the "drop-out" rate from this movement and the reasons for it and new challenges that are now presented. From a 2005 paper:

Now, many of the younger Baby Boomers and Generation Xers are finding their way back to the synagogue. Some are spiritually hungry; others are just looking for a place to park the children. Either way, they join congregations in large numbers on the suburban frontier. However, it is not so easy to become religiously involved. Meaningful religious life requires knowledge and learning takes time, something that many young families lack. Most of the parents also lack basic religious skills. The vast majority of American Jews do not know how to read a Hebrew prayer book, and this makes it difficult for them to participate in an active manner in synagogue ritual. This frustrates them and their egalitarian religious expectations. Rabbis reach out to as many different types of people as possible and encourage them to find ways of connecting to the congregation, and, through the synagogue, with God. Given the barriers of language, though, it is a difficult challenge.

== See also ==
- Born again
- Hyperreligiosity
- Jerusalem syndrome
- Jewish fundamentalism
- Messiah complex
- Off the derech
- Chabad outreach
- Conservative Judaism outreach
- Orthodox Judaism outreach
- Reform Judaism outreach
- Psychology of religion
- Radicalization
- Religious fanaticism
- Religious obsessive-compulsive disorder
- Spiritual crisis
