= Maija Blaubergs =

Canadian feminist scholar

- Born: February 20, 1947; Oldenberg, Lower Saxony, Germany
- Died: November 10, 2010 (aged 63)
- Occupation(s): Educational psychologist, feminist scholar, college professor, lawyer

Maija Sibilla Blaubergs (February 20, 1947 – November 10, 2010) was a German-born Latvian educational psychologist, feminist scholar, and lawyer, raised in Canada. She taught at the University of Georgia, where she was the first coordinator of the school's women's studies program, and at the center of a national controversy over tenure decisions.

== Early life and education ==
Blaubergs was born in Oldenburg, Germany, the daughter of Oskars Gustavs Blaubergs and Valentine Kuznecovs. Both of her parents were displaced persons born in Latvia, and the family emigrated to Canada in 1950. She graduated from Westdale Secondary School in Hamilton, Ontario. She earned a bachelor's degree at the University of Toronto. In 1972, she completed doctoral studies at the University of California, Santa Barbara, with a dissertation titled "Intra-word Semantic Structures." She attended law school at the University of Georgia in 1980 and 1981.

== Career ==
Blaubergs taught in the educational psychology department at the University of Georgia beginning in 1972, and was on the advisory committee to develop the school's first women's studies program. In 1976, when it launched, she was the program's first coordinator. When she was denied tenure in 1977, she sued the university on the basis of sex discrimination. The suit was eventually settled out of court, but one professor was jailed for contempt of court in 1980, and the case is remembered as "one of the most controversial and widely publicized suits dealing with sex discrimination in academia".

In 1978, Blaubergs presented a report on nonsexist language at the World Congress of Sociology, held in Uppsala, Sweden. She was active in the early years of the National Women's Studies Association. From 1985 to 1992, she was a lawyer based in Washington, D.C., specializing in transportation law.

== Publications ==
- "Are Structural Features of Word Meaning Reflected in Judgements of Semantic Similarity and Difference?" (1972)
- "Short-term memory limitations on decoding self-embedded sentences" (1974, with Martin D. Braine)
- "Semantic Anomaly from a Psychological Perspective" (1974)
- "Misunderstanding the Need for Eliminating Sexism in Language" (1974)
- "On 'the Nurse Was a Doctor'" (1975)
- "Encoding Self-Embedded Sentences" (1976)
- "The Interpretation of Semantic Anomaly in Context" (1976, with Kenneth H. Jarrett)
- "The Role of Semantics in the Application of Psycholinguistics to Language Assessment and Therapy" (1977)
- "Personality studies of gifted and/or creative females: A bibliography" (1978)
- "Changing the sexist language : the theory behind the practice" (1978)
- "Sociolinguistic Change Towards Nonsexist Language: An Overview and Analysis of Misunderstandings and Misapplications" (1978)
- "An Analysis of Classic Arguments Against Changing Sexist Language" (1979)
- "Creative women: their potential, personality, and productivity" (1979, with Marilyn Partridge Rieger)
- "Sex‐role stereotyping and gifted girls’ experience and education" (1979)
- "On the Usage of 'Ms.'" (1979)
- "The Processing of Metaphors and Their Paraphrases in Context" (1980, with Donald B. Yarbrough)
- "Jurisdiction over imports controversies after the Customs Courts Act of 1980" (1982)
- "Sovereign immunity - taxation - residence of foreign sovereign diplomatic and consular staff is immune from taxation under a bilateral agreement and the Foreign Sovereign Immunities Act" (1982)

== Personal life ==
Blaubergs moved to Latvia in the 1990s. She died in 2010, aged 63 years.
