= Siddur Lev Yisrael =

Siddur by Cheryl Magen

Siddur Lev Yisrael is a siddur written by Cheryl Magen and published by the Ktav Publishing House. The siddur was developed in part, as an initiative of Camp Ramah. Lev Yisrael is influenced by the ideology of Conservative Judaism and is the principal siddur used at Camp Ramah in the Poconos as well as the Perelman Jewish Day School in Philadelphia.

== Features ==
Designed for both learners and those already familiar with the Jewish liturgy, Lev Yisrael is unique in that it is one of the only siddurim used in Conservative Judaism which does not have an English translation. However, the siddur does feature a limited amount of English commentary and explanatory text.

== See also ==
- Siddur
- Siddur Sim Shalom
- Conservative Movement
- Camp Ramah
