= Camp Ramah in New England =

Jewish camp in Palmer, Massachusetts, US

Camp Ramah in New England ("Palmer")
- *out of date as of 2020
- Interactive map of Camp Ramah in New England ("Palmer")
- Location: Palmer, Massachusetts, U.S.
- Coordinates: 42.2094°N 72.3132°W
- Previous names: Ramah Connecticut, Ramah at Glen Spey
- Elevation: 377 feet (115 m)
- Type: Jewish summer camp
- Campus size: 76 acres (31 ha)
- Season: Summer
- Operated by: affiliated with the Conservative Movement of Judaism and the National Ramah Commission
- Established: 1953; 73 years ago
- Website: www.campramahne.org

Camp Ramah in New England (CRNE), located in Palmer, Massachusetts, is one of the oldest Ramah summer camps, organized by a Jewish conservation center. The camp traces its roots to Ramah Connecticut in 1953, followed by Ramah at Glen Spey, and has evolved into Camp Ramah in New England.

The camp provides campers with a Jewish educational experience. Campers are known as "Ramahniks." Ramah New England is known for its programs in sports, arts, Judaica, and Hebrew. Billy Mencow was director of the camp from 2000–2005. Rabbi Ed Gelb has been the director of the camp from 2006–present.

== Divisions (edot) ==
The camp is broken into different age groups, or edot (עדות) (s. edah):

Kochavim (stars) : 3–4th graders (2/4/8 weeks)
Ilanot (young trees): 4–5th graders (4/8 weeks)
Solelim (road pavers): 6th graders (4/8 weeks)
Shoafim (strivers): 7th graders (4/8 weeks)
Magshimim (achievers): 8th graders (4/8 weeks)
Bogrim (mature ones): 9th graders (4/8 weeks)
Machon (institution): 10th graders (4/8 weeks)
Nivonim (wise ones): 11th graders (8 weeks)

=== For Those Who Need Extra Support ===
Amitzim (brave ones): campers with special needs, as old as 21 (4/8 weeks)
Ma'avar (which Amitzim includes): campers with special needs, as old as 25 (4/8 weeks)
Tochnit Ha'avodah (vocational education or "voc-ed"): former Amitzim'ers who are employed by camp

Additionally, after Nivonim year, rising 12th graders have the option to attend the Ramah Seminar, a trip to Israel, and spend six weeks traveling around the country with other Ramahniks of the same age. They also have the option to participate in a week long trip to Poland.

The camp has a program for developmentally disabled youth, entitled the Tikvah Vocational program.

== The Camp Life ==
The camp is divided into two sides: A-Side and B-Side. A-side hosts Kochavim through Shoafim and B-Side hosts the rest of the edot along with the dining hall, infirmary (marp), ropes course, tree house, Beit Midrash complex, the Beit Am Gadol (the basketball complex that is also used for other ceremonies), the farm, and the garden. The oldest edah, Nivonim, is housed in a building complex called the K'far.

=== Palmer ===
Palmer, as the camp is also nicknamed, has a number of traditions, including Color War (Yom Sport), an annual sports competition within the camp; yamim meyuchadim, "special days"; an ongoing sports rivalry with Camp Ramah in the Berkshires; musicals performed by the four older edot entirely in Hebrew (in 2025, The Wizard of Oz was performed by Bogrim, Aladdin was performed by Machon, and Despicable Me was performed by Nivonim); and singing the Camp Ramah song, Shir Ramah. They play the rival camp in the Berkshires on "Yom Roo" under the unofficial mascot, the "Palmer Fighting Roos." The "Roo" has its own songs as well as merchandise. The oldest edot participate in a camping trip known as "etgar" (the Hebrew word for challenge); older edot are given the opportunity to travel off the grounds and choose from a number of hiking, canoeing, biking, rock climbing and rappelling, and spelunking trips. Their reputation has been noted and recognized by the Jewish Theological Seminary of America.

=== Shabbat ===
Shabbat is given a great deal of attention, with all of the camp gathering together for Friday night services and dinner. Saturday morning services are held within each edah, with senior staff members often giving Divrei Torah to the campers. On Friday nights, Nivonimers lead shira and on Saturday night, they lead Seudat Shlishit. Also, on Friday nights Nivonimers have the chance to give "Shabbos Stories" which are short speeches about life lessons usually learned in camp. The entire camp keeps Shabbat. Many of the sports teams that will participate in Yom Roo will practice with Saturday afternoon games, usually against staff members, and Mincha is held for all of B-side. Havdalah is held by edah, and B-side has Israeli dancing sessions, called Mandatory Fun Time (MFT) immediately following Havdalah each Saturday night. Occasionally Havdalah will be with the whole camp.

=== Yamim Ragilim ===
Yamim ragilim ("regular days") are broken into time periods called perakim (s. perek) and each is identified with a Hebrew letter (א, ב, ג, ד, ה, ו, ז). A regular day includes a sport, swimming, a chug (a special interest), Hebrew and Israeli culture classes, Limud (Jewish history) classes, free time, a period of rest, and shira or rikud ("song" or "dance"). Examples of chugim include omanut (art), nagarut (woodworking), dance, swimming, boating, a variety of sports, time on the high adventure ropes course, and video. In 2007, a number of new adjustments were made to the schedule, including an extra period known as bechirot (free choices), during which campers may choose from a number of activities in which to participate; shortened perakim for Hebrew and Yahadut, and a rotating two-meal schedule. Camp Ramah Yahadut is renowned for its ability to integrate formal learning with experiential education. The staff includes leading educational professionals from local synagogues and prep-school institutions such as Gann Academy in Waltham, Massachusetts. Campers describe their educational experiences at Ramah as "meaningful" and "not like Hebrew school under the trees at all."

Since 2015, bunk counselors also have an "anaf." This is a specialty which they run an elective for two hours on yamim ragilim. Anafim may include omanut (art), sports, serving as lifeguards, working on the ropes course, and many others.

=== Y'mei Meyuchad ===
Once a week, non-counselor staff members take their day off, so the counselors in each edah plan a special day free of regular programming called yamim meyuchadim (special days) to make up for the lack of staffing. Each special day is called "Yom (Name)". Yamim meyuchadim can be anything from Yom Pirate to Yom Willy Wonka, Yom Random, Yom MTV, etc., all with special programs and activities planned by the staff members. In some years, once a session each edah takes a trip outside of the camp. Special trips have taken campers to Red Sox games, art museums, the zoo, ice skating rinks, the Basketball Hall of Fame in Springfield, Massachusetts, and other locations around New England. In recent years, the entire camp goes to Six Flags New England once a summer.

Every year, one Yom Meyuchad is planned entirely by Nivonim campers, the oldest edah. They plan a camp-wide color war (Yom Sport), made up of four teams (adom: red, lavan: white, kachol: blue, and yarok: green) according to a certain theme. Recent themes include shapes (each color being a different shape), Inside Out, Mario Kart, The Avengers, Cereal Mascots, and many more. Beginning with a dramatic breakout in the afternoon before the Yom Meyuchad, a relay race called Apache usually occurs next after all campers have time to get into their assigned team colors. Over the roughly 27 hours, meals will be themed (i.e. silent lunch, only use spoons, eat like a dinosaur, etc), and campers will participate in various activities to try and earn points for their team. At the end of Yom Sport, closing ceremonies occur, where each team presents a team song (usually with parts in English and parts in Hebrew) and dances (usually including an A-side dance, a hip-hop dance, an acrobatic dance, a captains dance, and full team dance, although varies by team and year). A winner is then declared by the Nivonim campers serving as judges, often performed in a comical and dramatic re-enactment of a scene related to the theme.

== General ==
Camp Ramah in New England hosts children from Massachusetts, Connecticut, New Jersey, California, Canada, Rhode Island, New Hampshire, Vermont, Maine, New England, New York and the Washington, D.C. metropolitan area (predominantly Maryland and Northern Virginia. There are also a number of Israeli campers. The staff are usually former campers and hail from the same territory, but there are many Israelis, collectively called mishlachat. The mishlachat are counselors, Hebrew teachers, and Limud teachers. They also organize programs to educate campers about Israel. CRNE has the largest Israeli delegation of all the Ramah camps, and also hosts a number of Israeli campers.

There are approximately 900 campers and 250 staff at the camp over the course of eight weeks.

== Notable alumni ==
- Ben Bernanke
- Wolf Blitzer
- Andy Bloch
- Marta Kauffman
- B. J. Novak
- Ethan Slater
- Bruce Vilanch

== See also ==
- Conservative Judaism
- Summer camp
