= Reform Judaism outreach =

Reform Judaism outreach refers to the organizational and educational efforts by the Union for Reform Judaism (formerly Union of American Hebrew Congregations) and the Reform movement as a whole to draw into Jewish life the non-Jewish spouses of interfaith families and seekers who are looking for a new religious home in Judaism.

== History ==
Reform outreach was first proposed by Rabbi Alexander M. Schindler, then president of the Union of American Hebrew Congregations (UAHC), the congregational arm of Reform Judaism in North America, at a meeting of the organization's Board of Trustees on December 2, 1978, in Houston, Texas. Deploring the rising rate of intermarriage, which he regarded as a threat to Jewish survival, Rabbi Schindler urged Reform congregations to intensify their educational programs and to do "everything possible to draw into Jewish life the non-Jewish spouse of a mixed marriage."

Rabbi Schindler further called on the Reform movement "to launch a carefully conceived [o]utreach [p]rogram aimed at all Americans who are unchurched and who are seeking roots in religion." He envisioned a "dignified and responsible approach" aimed at "those reared in non-religious homes or those who have become disillusioned with their taught beliefs, the seekers after truth who require a religion which...encourages all questions, and...who need the warmth and comfort of a people well known for its close family ties and of an ancient, noble lineage."

Concerned about a possible Christian backlash, Rabbi Balfour Brickner, then director of the UAHC's Department of Interreligious Affairs, sent a letter to thirty-one prominent Protestant and Catholic clergy asking for their reactions to Rabbi Schindler's proposal to reassert Judaism's missionary legacy. The eighteen who responded reportedly "applauded Schindler's initiative as an affirmation of American religious pluralism, but several cautioned that a missionary drive might embolden Christian groups that target Jews for conversion."

The strongest criticism came from within the Jewish community. Rabbi Moshe Sherer, then president of the Haredi Agudath Israel of America, called Reform outreach to non-Jews "a further step to undermine the identity and continuity of the Jewish people." Rabbi Ismar Schorsch, then chancellor of the Conservative Jewish Theological Seminary of America, complained, "At a time when...Jewish financial resources are stretched even thinner, it borders on the incredulous to hear of a proposal to put serious money into bringing Judaism to the non-Jewish world." Jack Wertheimer, professor of history at the Jewish Theological Seminary of America, warned, "The Jewish community may pay dearly for Reform's bid at proselytizing. Bold pronouncements about missionizing are like a red flag waved in front of a charging bull."

Although an Orthodox Jew, Rabbi Emanuel Rackman, then president of Bar Ilan University, was amenable to Rabbi Schindler's outreach proposals: "To stem the tide of intermarriage today, our present attitude [aversion to conversions and converts] is as helpful as aspirin is for cancer...We need not engage in missionary activity; but when a positive attitude regarding conversion is likely to do more to insure the future of the Jewish people than a negative attitude, we must act accordingly."

In 1979, the UAHC's General Assembly adopted an outreach resolution in line with Rabbi Schindler's proposals, making welcoming Jews by choice an organizational priority. In partnership with the Central Conference of American Rabbis, the rabbinical arm of the Reform movement, the UAHC established the Commission on Reform Jewish Outreach to oversee Outreach programming. The principal educational outreach avenues are "Introduction to Judaism", a 16- to 20-week course in partnership with local congregations, and "A Taste of Judaism", a free 3-session class for Jews or people from different faith backgrounds who are interested in learning the basics of Judaism with an eye toward possible conversion. According to an outreach-minded survey of 429 men and women who had completed "Introduction to Judaism" courses in 1983–1984, 78% had either converted to Judaism or planned to convert, and some 90% of all those enrolled said they intended to raise their children as Jews.

Addressing the UAHC General Assembly in 1989, Rabbi Schindler declared outreach "the single innovation in present-day Reform Judaism for which I would like to be remembered." In the same speech, he broadened the outreach principle by calling for the full inclusion of gay and lesbian Jews in synagogue life. "In all of this," he said, "I am working to make the Reform Jewish community a home: a place where loneliness and suffering and exile end..."

Rabbi Schindler's successor as UAHC president, Rabbi Eric Yoffie, continued championing outreach. "In the absence of [o]utreach," he said, "tens of thousands of intermarried couples who are now members of our congregations would have been forever lost to the Jewish people." As Rabbi Schindler had done before him, Rabbi Yoffie encouraged Reform Jews to ask, but not pressure, non-Jews already part of Reform congregational life to consider converting to Judaism.

Rabbi Richard Jacobs, the current Union for Reform Judaism president, also affirmed outreach. "We practice [o]utreach," he told delegates at the 2013 URJ Biennial, "because it is good for the Jewish people." Focusing on the next generation, Rabbi Jacobs urged Reform congregations to practice what he termed "audacious hospitality" because "the majority of millennials will be the children of intermarriages, and potentially our leaders." Audacious hospitality is now among the URJ's three top priorities, along with strengthening congregations and tikkun olam (healing the world).

== Organizations ==
Union for Reform Judaism: the congregational arm of Reform Judaism in the United States and Canada (and formerly known as the Union of American Hebrew Congregations), which has an estimated constituency of some 880,000 registered adults in nearly 900 congregations. (http://www.urj.org) Central Conference of American Rabbis: the organization of Reform rabbis. (https://www.ccarnet.org)

== See also ==
- Conservative Judaism outreach
- Orthodox Jewish outreach
- Baal teshuva movement
- Conversion to Judaism
- Repentance in Judaism
