= Skeleton Lake (Ontario) =

Lake in Ontario, Canada

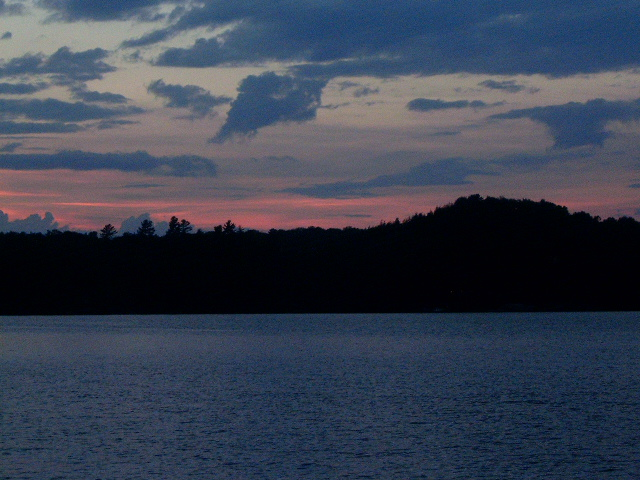

- Location of Skeleton Lake in Ontario.
- Location: Huntsville & Muskoka Lakes, Ontario, Canada
- Coordinates: 45°15′02″N 79°27′01″W
- Type: Lake
- Max. length: 8.3 km (5.2 mi)
- Max. width: 4.8 km (3.0 mi)
- Surface elevation: 280 m (920 ft)

Skeleton Lake is a lake in the municipalities of Huntsville and Muskoka Lakes in the District Municipality of Muskoka, Ontario, Canada, about 17 kilometres (11 mi) west of the town centre of Huntsville. Up until 1991, the Ministry of Natural Resources operated a fish hatchery on the lake.

== Geography ==
The lake is about 8.3 kilometres (5.2 mi) long and 4.8 kilometres (3.0 mi) wide, lies at an elevation of 280 metres (919 ft), and is in the Lake Huron drainage basin. The lake is known for its clear and deep water. Lake depths in the main basin reach over 200 feet. The sole outflow is the Skeleton River at the west of the lake. It is controlled by the Skeleton Lake Dam and flows through the community of Bent River to Skeleton Bay on Lake Rosseau.

There are two public-use islands in the area. The Hog's Back is a small rock island which used to exhibit much religious graffiti, but has since been eco-scrubbed and now is a bare rock with a fire pit, near Greer Bay. Anderson's island has a population of silver birches, along with a cliff-jumping area on the south-east side of the island, and also has religious-oriented graffiti carved into the trees and painted onto rocks. Other public-access areas exist, including a government dock in Wilson's Bay access from Skeleton Lake Road #2 and Beaman's Bay access from Skeleton Lake Road #3.

== Geology ==
The lake is thought to have been formed as a result of a meteorite impact. About 800 million years ago, an asteroid impact is suspected to have created a crater much larger than the remnant lake. Periods of glaciation since then have removed the original crater, leaving a lake approximately 2.2 miles (3.5 km) across and 100 meters deep at its centre. Ironclad evidence of the impact hypothesis would have been removed during the ice ages, and unless more shock geomorphology is found, the crater's origin cannot be certified beyond a reasonable doubt.

Due to the spring-fed nature of the lake, the water is exceptionally clear. According to residents of the lake, on calm days it is possible to see up to 30 metres (98 ft) underwater with the naked eye.

== Folklore ==
Skeleton Lake, or the Pool of Bones, is so named because, when surveyors were working on the north shore, they came upon two skeletons resting on the rocks. When they asked a local Indian chief where the skeletons came from, they were told that he and his people had camped one winter on Skeleton Lake. When food became scarce the tribe decided to move elsewhere. One mother, with a fourteen-year-old son too weak to move, refused to accompany them. They died together of starvation, and the lake was named in memory of this mother and her son. It is said there is an underground current that leads south, but no attempts have been made to find where it leads.

== Recreation ==
The open body of water in Skeleton Lake is the largest open body of water in all the Muskoka Lakes. This makes it a fitting lake for sports such as sailing and windsurfing, though there can be rough water. In mid August, an annual Regatta is held at Camp Newport. Sport scuba divers find the clear and deep water appealing.

Fishing is very difficult in the lake. Small Mouth Bass, Pickerel and Lake Trout can be caught although Rock Bass are a plenty and easy to catch for getting young children hooked on fishing. In the spring, lake trout will strike at minnows in cold shallow water. Later in the summer, trout like to stay in cold water below the second thermocline, which is typically 50–70 feet (15–21 m). This requires down-riggers to get the bait to the right depth. Small Mouth Bass can be caught in shallower depths. An annual fishing derby is held at the beginning of August.

Travel around the lake to see its granite rock faces that rise directly from the water. Most notably, Devil's Face Cliff can be viewed directly from the water, or you can access the viewpoint atop Devil's Face Cliff via a trail near the township dock at Wilson's Lodge.

There is a cottagers' association for the many cottagers who spend their time at Skeleton Lake.

=== Summer Camps ===
Skeleton Lake is home to several religion-based camps including Camp Ramah in Canada, a Jewish summer camp; Camp Kwasind, a Baptist camp; and Camp Newport, operated by The Salvation Army.

== See also ==
- List of lakes in Ontario
