= Camp Ramah in the Poconos =

Jewish summer camp in Pennsylvania, U.S.

Coordinates: 41.80371°N 75.30170°W

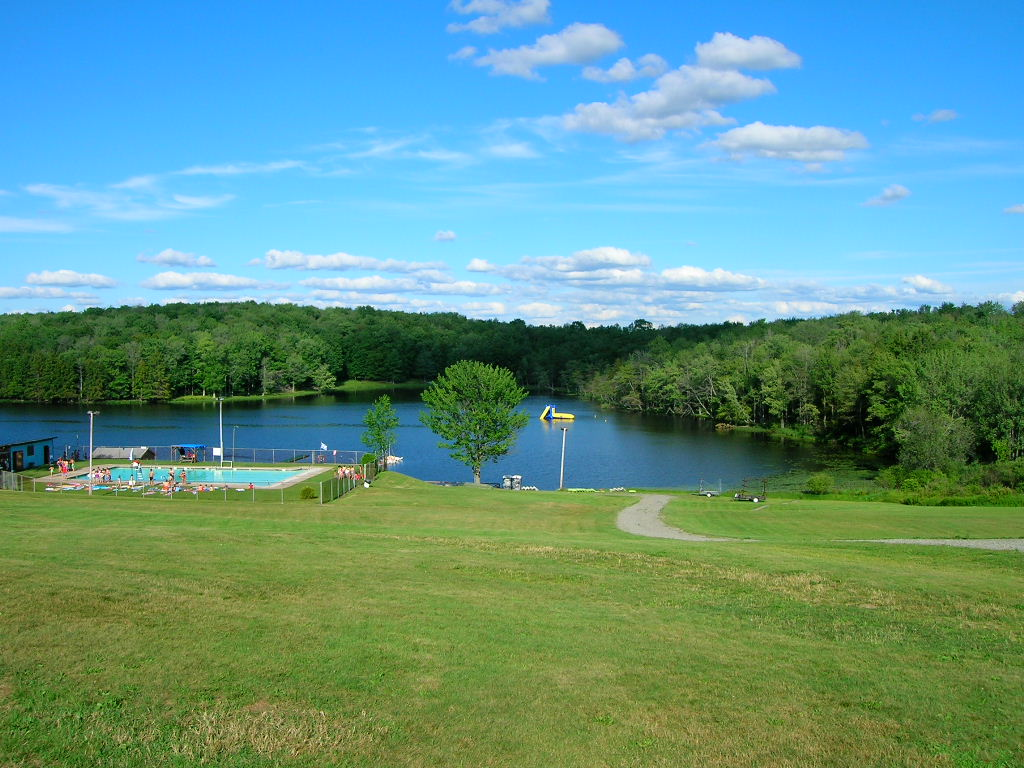
Ramah in the Poconos, pool and lake

Camp Ramah in the Poconos is a summer camp affiliated with the National Ramah Commission. Opened in 1950, it is located in the Pocono Mountains in High Lake, Pennsylvania (but is addressed in Lakewood, Pennsylvania, since High Lake does not have its own post office or ZIP code).

As with other Ramah camps, Camp Ramah in the Poconos is focused on Jewish education. Its program has an educational focus and includes Zionism, the Jewish lifecycle, and ritual. The camp seeks to maintain a connection with the State of Israel and uses Hebrew as the language of official instruction, communication, and education. The official prayer book of Camp Ramah in the Poconos is Siddur Lev Yisrael, authored by former director Cheryl Magen.

== History ==
The camp's site was purchased and donated in 1949 by Philadelphia's Har Zion Temple member Abe Birnbaum.

In the 1950s, Hebrew was the official spoken language at Ramah. At an alumni reunion in 2009, former campers, in their seventies, recalled phrases they had learned at Ramah like “Let’s go swimming,” or “Please pass the salt.”

== Divisions (edot) ==
Campers are split up into divisions by grade and age. These divisions are called Edot, the plural of the word Edah (עדה) which means group in Hebrew. The Edot which are at Ramah Poconos are:

English	Hebrew	Translation	Age Range	Other information
Notzetzim	נוֹצְצִים	Sparkles	Entering 4th & 5th grade	Formerly Nitzanim – ניצנים – buds
Tzi'irim	צְעִירִים	Young Ones	Entering 6th grade	
Chalutzim	חַלוּצִים	Pioneers	Entering 7th grade	
Bogrim	בּוֹגְרִים	Mature ones	Entering 8th grade	
Machon	מַכוֹן	Institution	Entering 9th grade	
Shoafim	שׁוֹאָפִים	Those who strive	Entering 10th grade	Formerly K'votzat Yonatan – קבצת ינתן – Yonatan's group
Gesher	גֶשֵׁר	Bridge	Entering 11th grade	Formerly Havurah
Yedidim	ידידים	Friends	Ages 12 to 17	First summer in 2016

Each Edah is led by a Rosh Edah (Unit Head) who supervises the counselors in each individual bunk.

After the two 4-week sessions conclude, the camp runs the Tikvah Family Camp for families with Jewish children with developmental disorders and/or social learning disorders.

== Staff ==
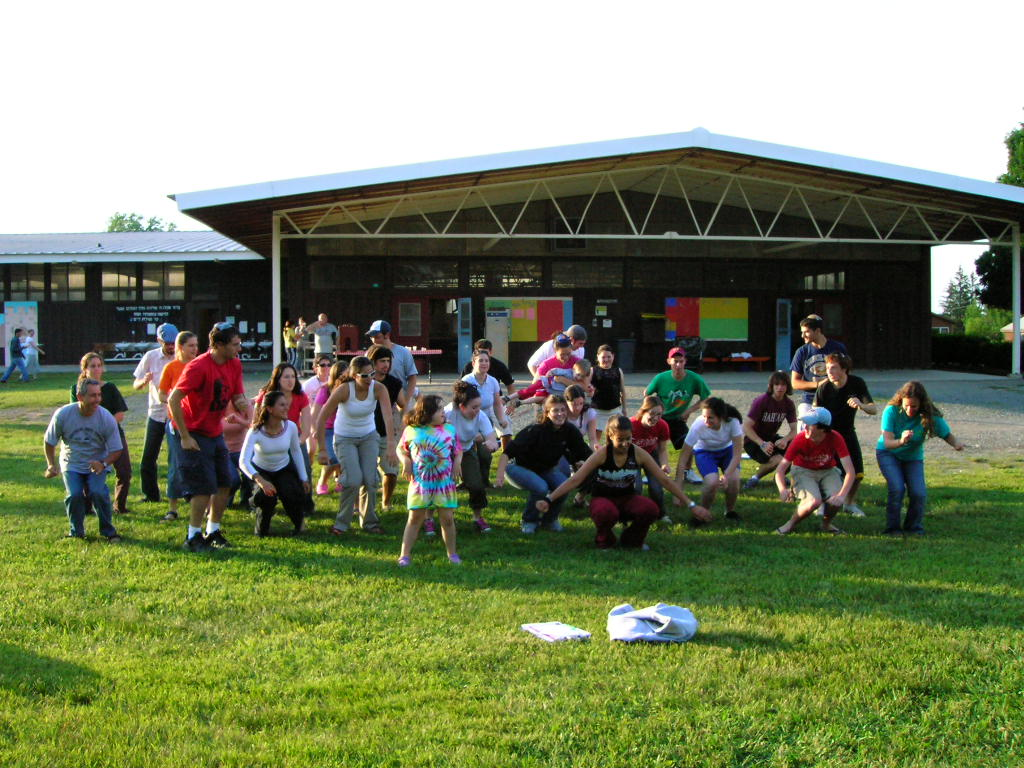
Staff dancing outside the dining hall

The staff of Ramah Poconos is composed largely of former Ramah campers. Staff are trained on a perpetual basis throughout the summer beginning with the week before the campers come. This "staff week" is named after and funded by an endowment in honor of Director Emeritus, Cheryl Magen. It is spent drilling safety procedures, camp rules, activity planning, and many other important things into the staff members. Throughout the summer, counselors and other staff members have Hadracha, (transliteration of הדרכה the Hebrew word for guidance) sessions that continue to train the staff in all necessary areas. Senior counselors are expected to mentor the junior counselors, so their Hadracha sessions spend a lot of focus on how to teach the younger counselors.

=== Mishlakhat ===
In addition to the regular staff, Ramah Poconos, together with the Jewish Agency for Israel, brings 40–50 Israeli staff members to camp each summer.

== Activities ==
The campers are permitted to choose two regular activities, like arts and crafts, Radio Ramah (WCRP), teva (nature), mitbachon (baking and cooking), creative dramatics, and many others. Some sports available for campers include basketball, baseball, tennis, soccer, hockey, softball, volleyball, archery, and flag football.

The camp drama program puts on several plays each summer, all of which are performed in Hebrew. The arts and crafts building has opportunities for painting, drawing, ceramics, and other forms of artistic expression. The music program gives singing lessons to the campers about 2–3 times a week and often offers additional musical activities, such as bands and a cappella groups.

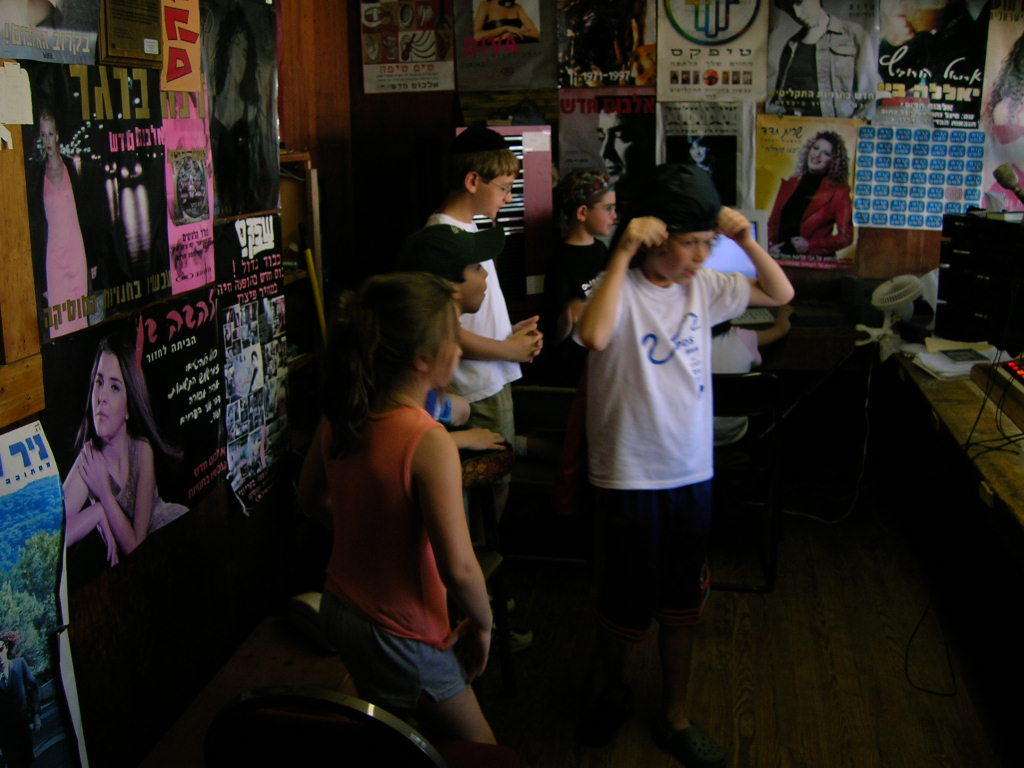
Campers in the WCRP studio

=== Waterfront and sports ===
All waterfront staff are certified lifeguards, and many have a history of competitive swimming or boating.

Ramah Poconos has a baseball field and three basketball courts.

== Tikvah Family Camp ==
The Tikvah Family Camp is a five-day overnight program for Jewish children with developmental disorders and/or social learning disorders, their parents, and their siblings.

== See also ==
- Conservative Judaism
- United Synagogue Youth
- Camp Ramah
