= Camp Ramah in Canada =

Jewish summer camp in Ontario, Canada

- Hebrew: מחנה רמה בקנדה

Information
- Motto: Enduring Friendships, Values, and Community
- Founded: 1960; 66 years ago
- Grades: 2–10
- Enrollment: 450–500
- Language: English, Hebrew
- Affiliation: Camp Ramah, USCJ
- Website: campramah.com

Camp Ramah in Canada (Hebrew: מחנה רמה, romanized: Machaneh Ramah) is a Jewish summer camp located at Skeleton Lake in Utterson in Muskoka, Ontario, approximately two hours north of Toronto. Part of the National Ramah Commission, Ramah is affiliated with the United Synagogue of Conservative Judaism. Camp Ramah in Canada was founded in 1960, and attracts approximately 500 campers each year from Canada, the United States, the United Kingdom, and Israel.
