= Edwin B. Minden =

Canadian judge on the Ontario Superior Court of Justice

The Honourable Edwin B. Minden

Justice of the Superior Court of Justice
- Incumbent
- Assumed office 1996
- Nominated by: Jean Chrétien
- Appointed by: Roméo LeBlanc
- Succeeded by: Laura A. Bird

Personal details
- Born: February 7, 1952 (age 74) Hamilton, Ontario
- Education: University of Toronto; Osgoode Hall Law School
- Occupation: Jurist
- Profession: Lawyer

Edwin B. "Ted" Minden is a Canadian judge on the Ontario Superior Court of Justice. On the recommendation of then-Attorney General and Minister of Justice Allan Rock, Justice Minden was nominated for the court in 1996 by then-Prime Minister Jean Chrétien.

== Education and early career ==
A native of Hamilton, Ontario, Justice Minden earned a B.A. from the University of Toronto, before completing his legal training at Osgoode Hall Law School in Toronto. He was called to the Bar of Ontario in 1978. Justice Minden was a criminal lawyer for almost twenty years before his appointment to the court.

== Personal life ==
Justice Minden grew up in Hamilton and now lives in Toronto.
