= Camp Ramah in the Berkshires =

Jewish summer camp in New York, US

- Founded: 1964; 62 years ago
- Founder: Rabbi Jerome (Jerry) Abrams
- Tax ID no.: 13-1997276
- Legal status: 501(c)(3) nonprofit organization
- Purpose: To provide camping, education, and boarding for campers under a religious structure.
- Location: Wingdale, New York
- Director: Eytan Graubart
- Board President: Atara Jacobson
- Affiliations: National Ramah Commission, Jewish Theological Seminary of America, Conservative Movement Judaism
- Revenue: $5,719,049 (2013)
- Expenses: $5,176,329 (2013)
- Staff: 394 (2012)
- Website: www.ramahberkshires.org

Camp Ramah in the Berkshires, near Wingdale, New York, is one of nine overnight summer camps and three day camps affiliated with the Conservative Movement of Judaism and the National Ramah Commission. It is accredited by the American Camp Association. The camp sits on 299-acre (1.21 km^{2}) site in Dutchess County, New York, about 30 miles (48 km) southwest of the Massachusetts border and the Berkshire Mountains, on Lake Ellis.

== Religious orientation ==
Camp Ramah is a religiously oriented camp that observes the laws of Shabbat and kashrut. Hebrew is widely used in all facets of camp life, from the names for buildings, physical infrastructure, and services, to camp activities and programs. Campers attend daily religious prayer services. On Mondays, Thursdays, and Saturdays the campers execute the traditional Torah service. Campers also attend classes or programs that the camp has set up to structure their Jewish background.

Counselors and alumni describe their summers at Ramah as one of the most formative experiences of their childhoods and a primary influence on their Jewish identity.

== Administration ==
From 2003 until 2017, the camp director was Rabbi Paul Resnick. Rabbi Jerome (Jerry) Abrams was the founder of the camp in 1964. He is now director emeritus. Rabbi David Mogilner, Rabbi Sheldon (Shelley) Dorph, David August, and Rabbi Burton Cohen were directors in late 1960 and 1970s.

== Special programs ==
The camp annually holds a Labor Day weekend for alumni of the camp who are 22 years old and over.

== Divisions ==
Campers are divided by age groups, called Edot in Hebrew:

- Cochavim ("Stars"), entering 4th grade
- Nitzanim ("Flower Buds"), entering 5th grade
- Shorashim ("Roots"), entering 6th grade
- Tzeirim ("Youths"), entering 7th grade
- Solelim ("Pavers"), entering 8th grade
- Bogrim ("Graduates"), entering 9th grade
- Machon ("Institute") entering 10th grade
- Gesher ("Bridge"), entering 11th grade

== See also ==
- Judaism
- Jewish education
