= Rabbi =

Teacher of Torah and spiritual leader in Judaism

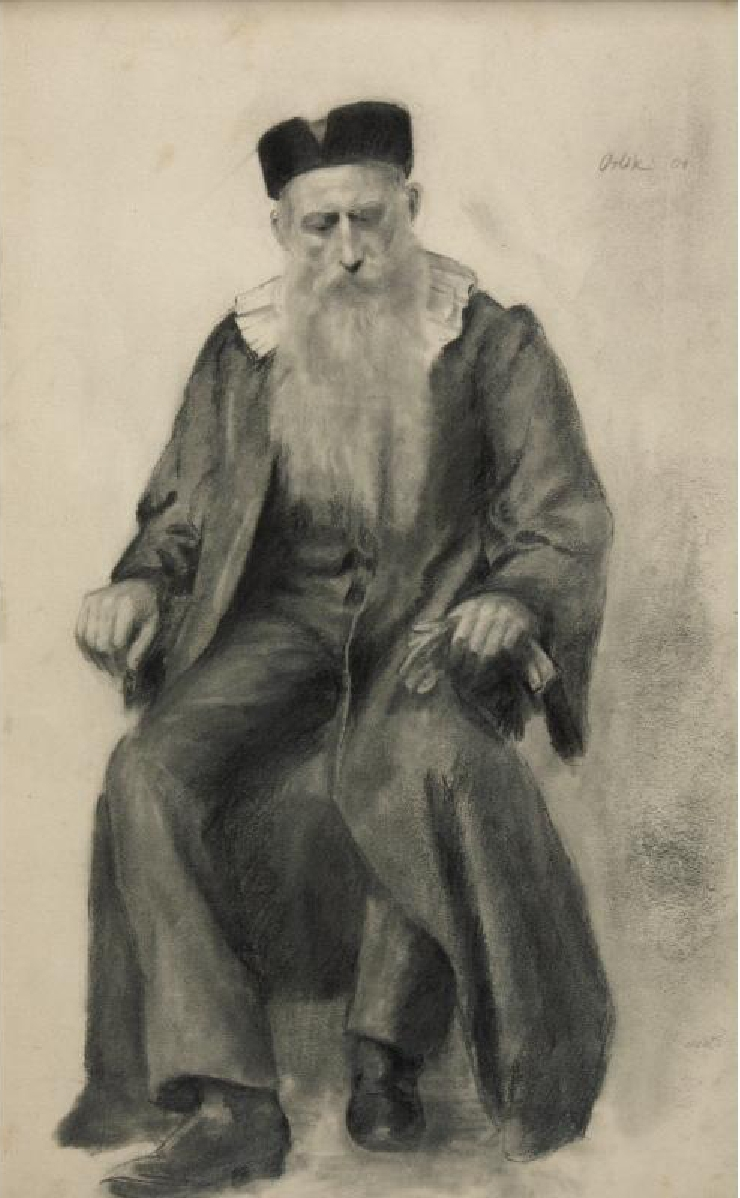
Portrait of a Rabbi, Emil Orlík, 1901

A rabbi (/ˈræbaɪ/; Hebrew: רַבִּי, romanized: rabbī, IPA: [ʁǝbːi]) is a Jewish preacher and religious leader in Judaism. A person becomes a rabbi by being ordained by another rabbi, known as Semikhah, following a course of study of Jewish history and texts, including the Tanakh, Midrash, Mishnah, Tosefta, Talmud, Halakha, and rabbinic commentaries thereon. The basic form of the rabbi developed between the Second Temple (167 BCE–73 CE), with influence from the Pharisees, and the Rabbinic periods (70–640 CE), when learned teachers—overlapping with the Tannaim, Amoraim, Savoraim, and early Geonim—assembled to codify Judaism's written and oral laws. The title "rabbi" was first used in the first century CE. In more recent centuries, the duties of a rabbi became increasingly influenced by the duties of the Protestant Christian minister, hence the title "pulpit rabbis." Further, in 19th-century Germany and the United States, rabbinical activities such as delivering sermons, pastoral counseling, and representing the community to the outside all increased in importance.

Within the various Jewish denominations, there are different requirements for rabbinic ordination, and differences in opinion regarding who is recognized as a rabbi. Non-Orthodox movements, including Conservative Judaism, Reform Judaism, Reconstructionist Judaism, and Jewish Renewal, have set their requirements for semikhah based on what they consider halakhic reasons (as in Conservative Judaism) and ethical reasons (as in Reform and Reconstructionist Judaism).

== Etymology and pronunciation ==
The word comes from the Mishnaic Hebrew construct רְבִּי rǝbbī, (Note: Some also connect it to Mishnaic Hebrew רֶבִּי rebbī, (Kaufmann A50 RH 2:12)/רִבִּי rībbī (Parma A RH 2:12) 'my master' but this term is extremely rare in ancient texts.) meaning 'Master [Name]'; the standard Hebrew noun is רב rav 'master'. Rav is also used as a title for rabbis, as are rabbeinu ('our master') and ha-rav ('the master'). A derived term is rebbe.

The Hebrew root in turn derives from the Semitic root ר־ב־ב (R-B-B), which in Biblical Aramaic means 'great' in many senses, including 'revered', but appears primarily as a prefix in construct forms. Although the usage rabim 'many' (as 1 Kings 18:25, הָרַבִּים) 'the majority', 'the multitude' occurs for the assembly of the community in the Dead Sea Scrolls, there's no evidence to support an association of this use with the later title "rabbi". The root is cognate to Arabic ربّ rabb, meaning 'lord' (generally used when talking about God, but also about temporal lords), and to the Syriac word ܪܒܝ rabi.

Some communities, especially Sephardic and Yemenite Jews, historically pronounced the title רִבִּי rībbī; this pronunciation competed with רְבִּי rǝbbī and רַבִּי rabbī in Ashkenaz until the modern period.

== Historical overview ==
"Rabbi" is not an occupation found in the Hebrew Bible, and ancient generations did not apply related titles such as rabban, rabbi, or rav for either the Babylonian sages or the sages in Israel. For example, Hillel I and Shammai (the religious leaders of the early first century) had no rabbinic title prefixed to their names. The titles "rabban" and "rabbi" are first mentioned in Jewish literature in the Mishnah. Rabban was first used for Rabban Gamliel the Elder, Rabban Simeon ben Gamliel (his son), and Rabban Yohanan ben Zakkai, all of whom were patriarchs or presidents of the Sanhedrin in the first century. Early recipients of the title rabbi include Rabbi Zadok and Rabbi Eliezer ben Jacob, beginning in the time of the disciples of Rabban Yohanan ben Zakkai. The title "Rabbi" (the Greek transliteration of ῥαββί) occurs in the Christian books of Matthew, Mark, and John in the New Testament, in which it is used—sometimes negatively—in reference to the "Scribes and Pharisees" as well as to Jesus.

Jewish tradition holds that the title "rabbi" or "rabban" was first used after 70 CE to refer to Yohanan ben Zakkai and his students, and references in Rabbinic texts and the New Testament to rabbis earlier in the 1st century are anachronisms or retroactive honorifics. However, some evidence suggests that the term "rabbi" was a well-known informal title by the beginning of the first century CE, and thus that the pre-70 CE Jewish and Christian references to rabbis reflect the titles used in this period.

The governments of the kingdoms of Israel and Judah were based on a system that included the Jewish kings; the Jewish prophets; the legal authority of the high court of Jerusalem, the Great Sanhedrin; and the ritual authority of the priesthood (כֹּהֲנִים, kōhănīm). Members of the Sanhedrin had to receive their ordination through an unbroken line of transmission from Moses. However, instead of being called "rabbis", they were referred to as "priests" or "scribes", like Ezra, who is called in the Hebrew Bible "Ezra the priest-scribe, a scholar in matters concerning GOD's commandments and laws to Israel"(Ezra 7:11, Revised JPS Edition). "Rabbi" as a title does not appear in the Hebrew Bible, though later Rabbinic sources occasionally use it as a title for wise biblical figures, as in tractate Pirkei Avot 6:3.

With the destruction of the two Temples in Jerusalem, the end of the Jewish monarchy, the decline of the dual institutions of prophets and the priesthood, and the later failure of the Bar Kokhba Revolt, the focus of scholarly and spiritual leadership within the Jewish people shifted to the sages of the Great Sanhedrin (הַסַּנְהֶדְרִין הַגְּדוֹלָה, ha-Sanhedrin ha-Gedolah). The Great Sanhedrin was composed of the earliest group of "rabbis" in the contemporary sense of the word, in large part because they began the formulation and explication of what became known as Judaism's Oral Torah (תּוֹרָה שֶׁבְּעַל־פֶּה, Tōrā šebbəʿal-pe, 'Torah of the mouth'). The Oral Torah was eventually codified in the Mishnah, Talmud, and subsequent Rabbinic scholarship, leading to what is known as Rabbinic Judaism.

=== Talmudic period ===
The traditional explanation is that from the 1st to 5th centuries, the title "rabbi" was given to those sages of the Land of Israel who received formal ordination (semikhah), while the lesser title "rav" was given to sages who taught in the Talmudic Academies in Babylonia, as ordination could not be performed outside the Land of Israel. Sherira Gaon summarized the relationship between these titles as follows: "Rabbi is greater than Rav, Rabban is greater than Rabbi, [and] one's name is greater than Rabban". However, some modern scholars argue that "rabbi" and "rav" are the same title, pronounced differently due to variations in dialect.

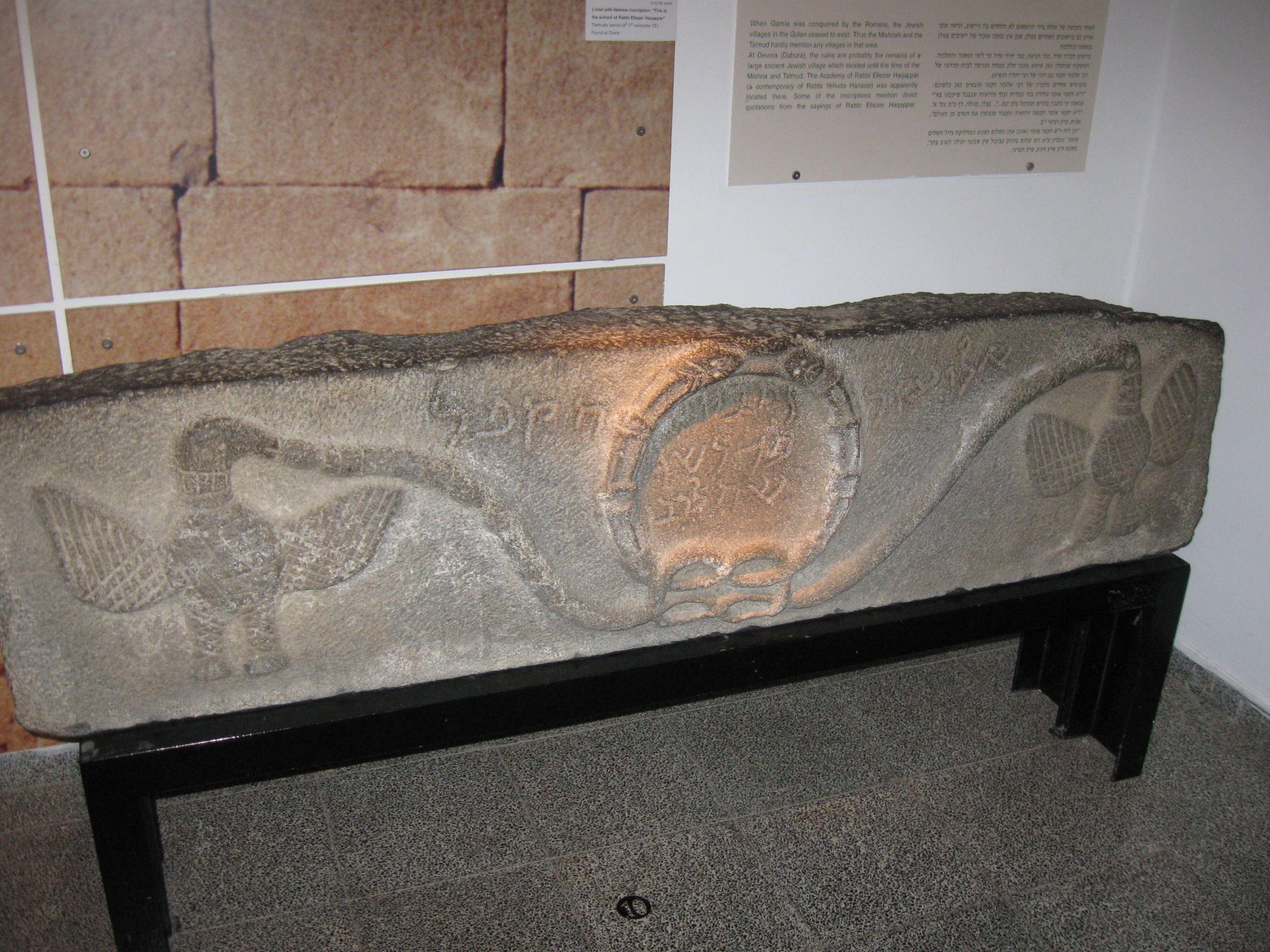
Inscribed door lintel mentioning the beth midrash of 3rd-century rabbi Eleazar ha-Kappar. On display at the Golan Archaeological Museum, Katzrin

After the suppression of the Jewish Patriarchate and Sanhedrin by Theodosius II in 425, there could no longer be formal ordination in the traditional sense. Like the Babylonian sages, a recognised scholar could be called Rav or Hakham (חכם, 'Wise [one]'). The transmission of learning from teacher to disciple remained of tremendous importance, but there was no formal rabbinic qualification.

=== Middle Ages ===
In the early Middle Ages, "rabbi" was not a formal title, but was used as a term of respect for Jews of great scholarship and reputation. After the emergence of Karaite Judaism, Jews who remained within the purview of normative—i.e., Rabbinic Judaism—became known as "rabbanites". Initially, communities might have had a religious judge appointed by the central geonate, often possessing a certification known as pitka dedayanuta or bearing the title chaver (short for chaver besanhedrin hagedolah, used in Israel) or aluf (used in Babylonia). By the 11th century, as the geonate weakened it was common for Jewish communities to elect a local spiritual authority. In the 11th–12th century, some local rabbinic authorities in Spain received formal certification known as ketav masmich or ketav minui in preparation for their leadership role. Maimonides ruled that every congregation is obliged to appoint a preacher and scholar to admonish the community and teach Torah, and the social institution he describes is the germ of the modern congregational rabbinate.

Until the mid-14th-century Black Death pandemic, Ashkenazi communities typically made religious decisions by consensus of scholars on a council, rather than the decision of a single authority. In the 14th century, the concept arose of a single person who served as the religious authority for a particular area (the mara de'atra). Formal ordination is first recorded among Ashkenazim with Meir ben Baruch Halevi (late 14th century), who issued the formal title Moreinu (our teacher) to scholars. However, it likely existed somewhat earlier. By the 15th century, this formal ordination, known as semicha, had become a requirement to be recognized as a rabbi. Initially, some Sephardic communities objected to such formal ordination, but over time they too adopted the system.

=== 18th–19th centuries ===
A dramatic change in rabbinic functions occurred with Jewish emancipation. Tasks that were once the primary focus for rabbis, such as settling disputes by presiding over a Jewish court, became less prominent, while other tasks that had been secondary, such as delivering sermons, increased in importance.

In 19th-century Germany and the United States, the duties of the rabbi in some respects became increasingly similar to the duties of other clergy, such as the Protestant Christian minister, and the title "pulpit rabbis" arose to describe this phenomenon. Sermons, pastoral counseling, and representing the congregation to the community all increased in importance. Non-Orthodox rabbis, on a day-to-day business basis, now spend more time on these functions than they do teaching or answering questions on Jewish law and philosophy. Within the Modern Orthodox community, many rabbis still mainly deal with teaching and questions of Jewish law, but many are increasingly dealing with these same pastoral functions.

Traditionally, rabbis have never been an intermediary between God and humans; this idea was considered outside the bounds of Jewish theology. Unlike spiritual leaders in many other faiths, they are not considered imbued with special powers or abilities.

== Functions ==
Rabbis serve the Jewish community. Hence, their functions vary as the community's needs vary over time and place.

=== Study and teaching ===
Rabbis have always been the main links in the chain of transmission (masorah, מסורה) of Torah throughout the generations of Jews. Learning from and studying previous generations' rabbinical leaders and thinkers, offering new insight (hidushim, חידושים), and teaching the public have always been primary functions of the rabbinate. Torah study is a rabbi's lifelong undertaking that does not end with ordination. A rabbi is expected to set aside time daily for study. A rabbi who does not constantly replenish their store of Torah learning will lack the knowledge, inspiration, and mastery of Halakha (Jewish law) and traditions required to perform all other rabbinic functions.

Once acquired, Torah must be passed on, given its status in Deuteronomy 33:4 as "the heritage of the congregation of Jacob". Teaching by rabbis occurs in many venues—elementary (cheder, חדר) schools and intermediate (yeshivah, ישיבה) and advanced (kollel, כולל) learning institutions, but also the public and community squares outside of learning institutions. In many synagogues, the rabbi will give a short class (shiur, שיעור) to those who attend morning and/or evening services. The sermon is another form of public education, often integrating Bible passages with a contemporary ethical message, and no Jewish meal or celebration is complete without the rabbi's d'var Torah (דבר תורה, 'Torah talk')—a short exposition of verses of Jewish literature related to a given discussion.

Apart from face-to-face instruction, rabbis have composed an extensive body of literature over the millennia of Jewish history, dealing with all aspects of the Jewish tradition. Jewish commentaries on the Bible, Halakha and halakhic commentaries, responsa, mystical and ethical tracts, and collections of sermons are examples of common genres of rabbinic literature.

=== Adjudicating ===
Before Jewish emancipation, rulers delegated discipline and dispute settlement within the Jewish community (kahal, קהל) to the Jewish community. If a dispute, domestic or commercial, a tort, or a petty crime, involved only Jewish residents, then it could be settled in the town's Jewish court (beit din, בית דין, 'house of judgement') according to Jewish law. The community's rabbi, with his extensive knowledge of Halakha, was expected to preside as Av Beit Din (אב בית דין, 'Father [of the] House of Judgement'), although lay assessors might join him in judgment. The judgments were enforced with fines and various degrees of communal excommunication (herem, חרם) when necessary.

After emancipation, Jews turned to civil courts for dispute resolution as citizens of their respective countries. Today, rabbinical courts remain active under the auspices of each Jewish denomination for religious matters, such as conversion and divorce, as well as for civil matters when the parties (voluntarily) elect to have rabbinical judges serve as their arbitrators. In Israel, there are rabbinical courts for matters of personal status.

=== Legislating ===
During the era of Jewish self-government, some problems in the community were considered regional or universal and could not be solved by a rabbi acting alone. Rabbinical synods were convened for concerted action, calling together the prominent rabbis of the region to debate solutions and enact binding regulations (takkanot, תקנות) for their communities. The regulations involved matters as diverse as dowries and matrimonial law; relations with gentiles; utilizing civil courts; the handling of orphaned children; anti-counterfeiting measures; and hiring schoolteachers. The most famous of these ordinances is ascribed to Rabbeinu Gershom, and was probably enacted in a rabbinic synod he convened in c. 1000 CE. The ordinance, still in effect today, prohibits polygamy among Jews in the West.

In the contemporary era, rabbis from all major Jewish religious movements—Conservative, Modern Orthodox, Reform, Reconstructionist, Hasidic, and Haredi—have enacted takkanot both in the State of Israel and throughout the Jewish diaspora. In Israel, where the Chief Rabbinate holds exclusive governmental authority over matters of personal status and formally recognizes only Orthodoxy, enactments by non‑Orthodox movements lack official standing. Today, most congregational rabbis are members of a national rabbinic organization related to their movement, (Note: These include the Central Conference of American Rabbis for Reform rabbis, the Rabbinical Council of America for Orthodox rabbis, and the Rabbinical Assembly for Conservative rabbis.) and there is often an association of local rabbis in their city. When these bodies debate local and national questions, they function in a manner that is similar to the rabbinic synods of the past.

=== Religious supervision ===
The Jewish community requires a number of religious institutions for daily life, and it falls to rabbis, with their knowledge of Jewish law, to supervise them to ensure they operate according to Jewish law. Examples are the regulation of butchery (shekhita, שְׁחִיטָה); Jewish dietary laws in local shops and institutions (kashrut, כַּשְׁרוּת); the community's ritual bath (mikveh, מִקְוֶה); the community's elementary school (cheder); the Shabbat boundaries, or eruvim (עֵרוּבִים, 'mixture'); and the synagogue's chevra kadisha (חֶבְרָה קַדִּישָׁא, 'sacred society'). In the modern era, rabbis who specialize in this type of supervision may find full-time employment as a mashgiach (משגיח, 'overseer'), and some of these functions are now performed by national organizations, such as the Orthodox Union, which has a kosher certification agency.

=== Rabbinical counseling ===
In addition to answering questions about Jewish law and rituals, a congregational rabbi is often sought for pastoral counseling on personal matters by congregants, as well as for general pastoral care. Much of a modern rabbi's time is devoted to pastoral work, including visiting the sick (ביקור חולים, bîqûr ḥôlîm)—a mitzvah (מִצְוָה) in Judaism—and officiating at lifecycle occasions like deaths and births. In the pre-modern era, rabbis had no special training in counseling, relying instead on personal qualities of empathy and caring. These factors continue to inform rabbinical counseling in the modern era. However, many rabbinical seminaries offer, if not mandate, formal training and coursework in psychology (e.g., counseling psychology) and pastoral counseling as part of the ordination curriculum and may offer internships in counseling and social services for rabbinical students. Among Hasidic Jews, turning to the community's rebbe for advice on personal matters is common.

=== Leading prayer ===
Traditionally, rabbis were not tasked with leading Jewish prayer services. There is no requirement that a rabbi be present for public prayer. The Jewish liturgy is fixed and printed in siddurim (סִידּוּרים); the vocal portions are chanted by a cantor (hazzan), and the Torah portion is read by a trained reader (ba’al koreh, בַּעַל קוֹרֵא). Before the modern era, the rabbis were present; they were typically seated in front near the Torah ark, and as a matter of respect, the pace at which the rabbi recited their prayers set the pace of the service. If halakhic questions arose about the prayer service, the rabbi would answer them.

In modern synagogues, the rabbi is more active in leading prayer services. In some synagogues, it is permitted for the rabbi to select passages from the prayer book for public reading, omit some passages for brevity, and add special prayers to the service. The rabbi may also lead the congregation in responsive reading, announce page numbers, and comment on the liturgy occasionally. At Shabbat and holiday services, the congregational rabbi may deliver a sermon before or after the Torah is read.

=== Celebrating life's events ===
Halakha does not require the presence of a rabbi at a marriage, bar or bat mitzvah, brit milah (circumcision), funeral or house of mourning, or the unveiling of a monument at a cemetery. At the same time, Jewish law has prescribed requirements for every event and ritual. It therefore became customary for rabbis to be present and lead the community in celebration and mourning. In the modern era, it is virtually obligatory to have the rabbi's participation at these events, and ministering to the congregation in these settings has become a major aspect of the modern rabbinate. Jewish divorce, which requires a beit din, will always have rabbis in attendance.

=== Conducting charity ===
The synagogue has been a place where tzedakah (צְדָקָה, 'charity') is collected every weekday after services and then distributed to the needy before Shabbatot (שַׁבָּתוֹת, 'Shabbat days') and holidays. However, most synagogues now suggest that congregants support the synagogue via an annual dues payment, usually collected monthly. It was not the rabbi who collected these sums; that task was assigned to the shammash (שַׁמָשׁ, 'helper'), wardens of charity, and charitable associations. Still, the rabbi's task was to teach that charity is a core Jewish value. The rabbi did this by preaching, teaching, and by leading by example—hosting poor out-of-town yeshiva students at the home table and offering Jewish travelers a kosher meal. Maimonides formulated a ladder of eight degrees of charity, starting with reluctant giving and ending with teaching someone a trade. Rabbi Israel Salanter (1809–1883) was once asked, "How do you provide for your spiritual needs?" He answered, "By providing for someone else's physical needs." Today, Jewish federations and foundations collect and distribute most charity within the Jewish community. However, the rabbi retains the task of teaching the value of charity and often participates personally in appeals for the synagogue and for national and international causes.

=== Role-modeling ===
The rabbi serves as a role model for the congregation through their conduct and deportment. Congregation members are keen observers of their rabbi's personality traits, family life, professional conduct, leisure activities, and how they treat others. Rabbis are aware of this and, in the best case, deliberately model their conduct to represent Jewish values to the community and outsiders.

This aspect of the rabbinate, setting an example for the public, has a direct application in Jewish law. The way the greatest rabbis and Torah scholars conduct themselves can become a precedent in Jewish law, known as ma'aseh (מַעֲשֶׂה, 'act'). For example, based on reports of what rabbis did in the Talmud, Maimonides ruled that one engaged in public affairs should not break off their duties to recite certain prayers.

=== Jewish outreach ===
Some rabbis, if not synagogues, program and guide activities designed to reach Jews unaffiliated with Judaism or lapsed in their observances. These include "beginners' services" wherein the Jewish liturgy is shortened and explained, and Shabbatons, wherein unaffiliated Jews are hosted by an observant family during Shabbat to experience the day in a religious setting and to learn about its rituals and customs. Outreach is a defining feature of Chabad Judaism, with designated buildings—often actual houses—in many cities worldwide having Chabad houses for centralized outreach activities to unaffiliated Jews and prospective converts in the community. Chabad employs rabbis (who, in Chabad Judaism, must be male) and their families to staff Chabad houses and conduct Chabad programming. In addition to Chabad Judaism, the Conservative, Modern Orthodox, and Reform movements also have formal kiruv (Hebrew: קירוב, lit. 'bringing close') programs.

=== Conversions ===
Most rabbis occasionally encounter non-Jewish individuals seeking information about Judaism or wishing to explore conversion to Judaism. This may happen when one member of a couple wishing to marry is seeking conversion, or on other occasions when intermarriage is not involved. Based on the rabbi's training and assessment of the person's motivations and goals, the rabbi's approach may range from discouragement of the potential convert to mentoring and directing to a conversion class, in accordance with the policy on conversion of the rabbi's movement. At least one rabbi will serve on the beit din that performs a conversion. There are no rabbis serving as "Jewish missionaries" per se; there is no parallel in Judaism to the proselytizing of other faiths.

=== Match-making ===
In periods when match-making was common, rabbis were key to finding partners for their congregants in the community. Rabbis were well-acquainted with their community members, particularly the young unmarried men attending their yeshivas. Parents did not hesitate to consult the rabbi for suitable matches. Today, in Orthodox circles in which socializing among the sexes is uncommon, this practice continues, and in all branches of Judaism, a rabbi who can help in this arena will not hesitate to do so.

=== Synagogue administration ===
The modern synagogue is a non-profit religious corporation run by a board of directors elected by the members. However, board members are not present on a day-to-day basis. In most synagogues, the rabbi administers the synagogue, supervises personnel, manages the physical plant, reviews (if not writes) the newsletter, and interacts with the brotherhood, the sisterhood, and the youth organizations. Very large synagogues may employ a separate administrator or assistant rabbi to perform some or all of these functions.

=== Chaplaincy ===
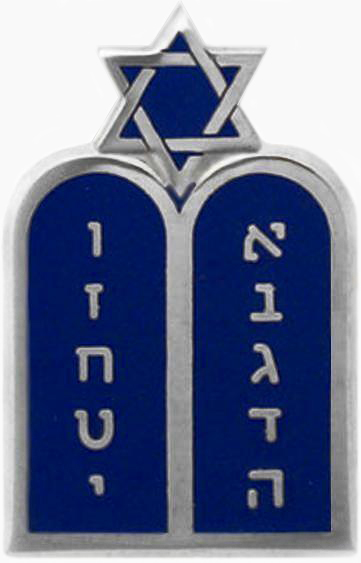
Jewish chaplain insignia, U.S. Air Force

Rabbis go into the field wherever members of the Jewish community may be found. This is most noticeable in the military services and university campuses where some rabbis serve as Jewish chaplains full-time. All branches of the U. S. military have Jewish chaplains in their ranks, and rabbis serve in the Israel Defense Forces. The Hillel Foundation provides rabbis and Jewish services on 550 campuses, while Chabad operates Jewish centers with a rabbi near 150 college campuses. Local rabbis perform other chaplaincy functions on a part-time basis in hospitals, senior homes, and prisons. Worthy of mention are the rabbis who accompanied Jews to concentration camps during the Nazi era; in dire circumstances, they continued to provide rabbinic services, such as ritual observance, advice, and counseling, to the victims of Nazi persecution, whenever it was possible to do so.

=== Community engagement ===
As leaders of the Jewish community, many rabbis devote a portion of their time to activities in the public arena, especially where Jewish interests are at stake. They dialogue with public officials and community groups, interact with school boards, advocate for and against legislation, engage in public debates, write newspaper columns, appear in the media, and march in parades and demonstrations with others to show support for causes. The extent and tenor of these activities are dictated by the rabbi's conscience and social and political leanings as informed by Jewish values.

=== Defending Judaism ===
Rabbis are often called upon to defend the Jewish faith. During the Middle Ages, the Catholic Church arranged a series of public disputations between rabbis and priests that were intended to "disprove" the Jewish faith and condemn its religious texts, including the Talmud. The rabbis acquitted themselves well in debate with their superior understanding of Jewish texts, and mass conversions to Christianity did not take place. However, following these disputations, local rulers, at the Catholic Church's behest, consigned cartloads of precious Hebrew manuscripts to the flames. Today, rabbis are involved in countering the activities of missionaries aimed at converting Jews to other religions, explaining, for example, that one cannot be of the Jewish faith while believing in either the Christian God or the Christian messiah.

=== Interfaith activities ===
Some rabbis engage in interfaith dialogue with clergy of other faiths. They may host student groups from the religious schools of other faiths and participate in interfaith services. They will view these activities as a means of deepening understanding and reducing misconceptions in a diverse society. Other rabbis, especially those affiliated with Orthodox Judaism, will generally not participate in interfaith dialogues about theology. They will, however, engage in discussions with the clergy of other faiths about matters of mutual social concern.

=== Community rabbinate ===
There is a segment of the rabbinate that does not engage in rabbinic functions on a daily basis, except perhaps to study. Because rabbinic ordination (semikhah) has the features of a post-graduate academic degree, some study to receive ordination but then follow a different career in secular business, education, or the professions. These rabbis may be asked from time to time to perform a rabbinic function on an ad hoc and voluntary basis (e.g., to conduct a marriage ceremony or answer a religious question). At other times, they act as regular members of the Jewish community. No negative attitudes attach to rabbis who do not practice the profession. They are likely admired in their communities for their decision to spend years engaged in advanced Torah study for its own sake.

=== Compensation ===
In antiquity, those who performed rabbinic functions, such as judging a case or teaching Torah to students, did not receive compensation for their services. Being a rabbi was not a full-time profession, and those who served had other occupations to support themselves and their families, such as woodchopper, sandal-maker, carpenter, water-carrier, farmer, or tanner. A respected scholar, Rabbi Zadok (1st century CE), said "never to use the Torah as a spade for digging," which was understood to mean that one should never use one's Torah knowledge for an inappropriate purpose such as earning a fee. Still, as honored community members, Torah sages were allowed a series of privileges and exemptions that somewhat alleviated their financial burdens. These included such things as tax exemption from communal levies, marketplace priority (first in, first out regarding their trade), receiving personal services from their students (shimush talmedei hakhamim, שימוש תלמידי חכמים), silent business partnerships with wealthy merchants, and a substitute fee to replace their lost earnings when they had to leave work to perform a rabbinic function (sekhar battalah, שכר בטלה).

During the period of the Geonim (c. 650–1050 CE), opinions on compensation shifted. It was deemed inappropriate for the leaders of the Jewish community to appear in the marketplace as laborers or vendors of merchandise, and leading a Jewish community was becoming a full-time occupation. Under these conditions, the Geonim collected taxes and donations at home and abroad to fund their schools (yeshivot) and paid salaries to the Jewish community's teachers, officials, and judges, whom they appointed. Maimonides, who supported himself as a physician, reasserted the traditional view of offering rabbinic service to the Jewish community without compensation. It remains the ideal, but circumstances have changed. Jewish communities required full-time rabbis, and the rabbis preferred to spend their days studying and teaching Torah rather than working at a secular trade.

By the fifteenth century, it was the norm for Jewish communities to compensate their rabbis. However, the rabbi's contract might refer to a "suspension fee" (sekhar battalah) rather than a salary, as if he were relinquishing a salary from secular employment. The size of salaries varied, depending on the size of the community served, with rabbis in large cities being well-compensated while rabbis in small towns might receive a small stipend. Rabbis were able to supplement their rabbinic incomes by engaging in and accepting fees for associated functions such as serving as the community's scribe, notary, and archivist, teaching in the elementary school or yeshivah, publishing books, arbitrating civil litigations, or even serving as a matchmaker.

With the formation of rabbinical seminaries starting in the nineteenth century, the rabbinate experienced a degree of professionalization still underway. An ordained graduate of a rabbinical seminary that is affiliated with one of the modern branches of Judaism, Reform, Conservative, Reconstructionist, or Modern Orthodox, has become able to find employment—whether as a congregational rabbi, teacher, chaplain, campus Hillel director, camp director, social worker or administrator—through the placement office of their seminary. Like any modern professional, ordained graduates negotiate the terms of employment with potential employers and sign a contract specifying duties, duration of service, salary, benefits, pension, and the like. A rabbi's salary and benefits have become similar to those of other modern professionals, such as lawyers and accountants, with comparable levels of post-graduate education. It is also possible to engage in the rabbinate part-time (e.g., at a synagogue with a small membership); the rabbi's salary will be proportionate to the services rendered and they are likely to have additional employment outside the synagogue.

=== Authority ===
The practical basis for rabbinic authority involves accepting the rabbi and their scholarly credentials. In practical terms, Jewish communities and individuals commonly proffer allegiance to the authority of the rabbi they have chosen. Such a rabbinic leader is sometimes called the mara d'atra (Jewish Babylonian Aramaic: מָרָא דְּאַתְרָא, lit. 'master of the place'). Jewish individuals may acknowledge the authority of others but will defer legal decisions to the mara d'atra.

The rabbi derives authority from achievements within a meritocratic system. Rabbis' authority is neither nominal nor spiritual, based on credentials. Typically, the rabbi receives an institutional stamp of approval. This authority allows them to engage in the halakhic process and make legal prescriptions.

The same pattern is true within broader communities, ranging from Hasidic communities to rabbinical or congregational organizations. There will be a formal or de facto structure for rabbinic authority responsible for the community members. However, Hasidic communities do not have a rabbi; they instead have a Rebbe, who plays a similar role but is thought to have a special connection to God. The Rebbe's authority is based on a spiritual connection to God, and they are venerated differently from rabbis.

=== Honor ===
According to the Talmud, citing Leviticus 19:32, it is a mitzvah to honor rabbis, Torah scholars, and older people. One should stand in their presence and address them with respect. Kohanim (priests) are required to honor rabbis and Torah scholars like the general public. However, if one is more learned than the rabbi or the scholar, there is no need to stand. The spouse of a Torah scholar must also be shown deference. It is also a commandment for teachers and rabbis to honor their students. Rabbis and Torah scholars have the authority to place individuals who insult them under a herem (excommunication) to ensure discipline within the Jewish community.

== Ordination ==
=== Classical ordination ===
The first recorded examples of ordination are Moses transmitting his authority to Joshua, as well as the 70 elders. Similarly, Elijah transmitted his authority to Elisha.

According to Pirkei Avot, ordination was transmitted without interruption from Moses to Joshua, to the elders, to the prophets, to the Great Assembly, to the Zugot, and to the Tannaim. The chain of semikhah was probably lost in the 4th or 5th century CE, though possibly as late as the 12th century. According to Maimonides (12th century), if it were possible to gather the greatest sages of the generation, a reconstituted court could confer classic semikhah. Since then, a number of modern attempts to revive the Sanhedrin have been made. No such attempt has been accepted as valid among a consensus of rabbis or persisted for longer than about a century.

=== Contemporary ordination ===
Since the end of classical ordination, other forms of ordination have developed, which use much of the same terminology but have lesser significance in Jewish law. Nowadays, a rabbinical student is awarded semikhah after completing a yeshiva or modern rabbinical seminary program. The exact course of study varies by denomination, but most are in the range of 3–6 years. The programs all include Talmud study, the codes of Halakha, and the responsa literature to a greater or lesser extent, depending on the branch of Judaism. In addition to rabbinical literature, modern seminaries offer courses in pastoral subjects, including counseling, education, comparative religion, and sermon delivery. There is no unifying authority over all movements of Judaism that either supervises rabbinic education or records ordinations; each branch of Judaism regulates the ordination of the rabbis affiliated with it.

The most common formula used on a certificate—without punctuation—of semikhah is yoreh yoreh (יוֹרֶה יוֹרֶה, '[they] shall teach; [they] shall teach'). Most rabbis hold this qualification; they are sometimes called a moreh hora'ah (מוֹרֶה הוֹרָאָה, 'teacher of rulings'). A more advanced form of semikhah is yadin yadin (יָדִין יָדִין, '[they] shall judge; [they] shall judge'). The latter enables the recipient to serve as a judge on a rabbinical court and adjudicate cases of monetary law, among other responsibilities. The recipient of this ordination can be formally addressed as a dayan (דַיָן, 'judge [of religious law]'; pl. dayanim) and also retain the title of rabbi. Only a small percentage of rabbis earn the yadin yadin ordination. Although not strictly necessary, many Orthodox rabbis hold that a beit din should be made up of dayanim with this ordination.

=== Orthodox and Modern Orthodox Judaism ===
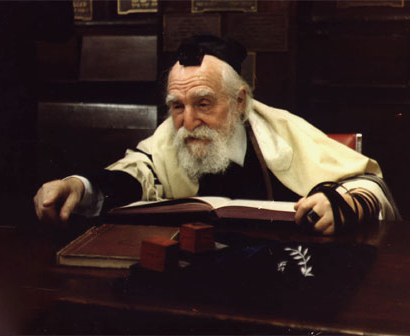
Rabbi Moshe Feinstein, a leading Rabbinical authority for Orthodox Judaism of the second half of the twentieth century

An Orthodox semikhah requires the successful completion of a program encompassing Jewish law and responsa, in accordance with longstanding tradition. Orthodox rabbis typically study at a yeshiva, which provides training in general Torah scholarship; increasingly, Orthodox rabbis further train at a kollel. Both yeshivas and kollels are forms of rabbinical schools or academies. In both cases, the programs are typically post-undergraduate, lasting an average of two years, and usually follow at least four years of intensive yeshiva study, which involves rigorous religious and Talmudic learning.

In achieving semikhah, rabbinical students work to gain knowledge in specific and relevant Talmudic sugyas and their development by the Rishonim and Acharonim (early and late medieval commentators), leading to their application in Halakha—particularly as traced by the Arba'ah Turim. Building on this is the study of those sections of the Shulchan Aruch—together with its main commentaries—that pertain to daily-life questions (such as the laws of keeping kosher, Shabbat, and the laws of family purity). An element of shimush ("apprenticeship") is often also required.

Religious Zionist and Modern Orthodox rabbinical students, such as those at the Hesder yeshivas and Yeshiva University, respectively, also formally study hashkafa (i.e., the major elements of Jewish philosophy and theology) and its application to contemporary questions. Their study proceeds systematically through the Rabbinic literature; other students will have studied these works independently.

The entrance requirements for an Orthodox yeshiva include a strong background within Jewish law, liturgy, Talmudic study, and attendant languages (e.g., Hebrew, Aramaic, and, in some cases, Yiddish). Specifically, students are expected to have acquired analytic skills and wide breadth in Talmud scholarship before commencing their rabbinic studies. At the same time, since rabbinical studies typically build upon other yeshiva studies, those who seek semikhah are generally not required to have completed a university education. Exceptions exist, such as Yeshiva University, which requires all rabbinical students to complete an undergraduate degree before entering the program and a master's degree or equivalent before ordination.

Historically, women were not permitted to become Orthodox rabbis. Starting in 2009, some Modern Orthodox institutions began ordaining women with the title of "Maharat" (מהר״ת, an abbreviation of מנהיגה הלכתית רוחנית תורנית, manhiga hilkhatit ruhanit toranit, '[female] leader [of] Halakha, spirituality, [and] Torah'); later, "Rabbi" and "Rabbah" (רבה) were bestowed, as well. This is currently a contested issue for many Orthodox institutions, leading some to seek alternate clerical titles and roles for women (e.g., Toanot Rabniyot and Yoetzet Halacha).

While some Haredi Jewish (including Hasidic Jewish) yeshivas do grant official ordination to many students wishing to become rabbis, most of the students within the yeshivas engage in Torah and Talmud study without the goal of becoming rabbis or holding official positions. The curriculum for obtaining ordination as rabbis for Haredi scholars is the same as described above for all Orthodox students seeking to hold the official title of "Rabbi".

Within the Hasidic community, the positions of spiritual leadership are dynastically transmitted within established families, usually from fathers to sons, while a small number of students obtain official ordination to become dayanim on religious courts, poskim (פוסקים, 'legal decisors'), as well as teachers in the Hasidic schools. The same is true for the non-Hasidic Litvish yeshivas that are controlled by dynastically transmitted roshei yeshiva (ראשי ישיבה, 'heads of yeshiva'), and the majority of students will not become rabbis (even after many years of post-graduate kollel study).

Some yeshivas, such as Yeshivas Rabbeinu Yisrael Meir HaKohen and Yeshivas Ner Yisroel in Baltimore, Maryland, may encourage their students to obtain semikhah and serve as rabbis who teach in other yeshivas or Hebrew day schools. Other yeshivas, such as Yeshiva Rabbi Chaim Berlin (Brooklyn, New York) or the Mirrer Yeshiva (in Brooklyn and Jerusalem), do not have an official semikhah to train rabbis. Rather, they provide semikhah on an "as needed" basis if and when one of their senior students is offered a rabbinical position but only with the approval of their roshei yeshiva.

Haredi Jews will often prefer using Hebrew terms for rabbinic titles, including Rav (denoting "rabbi"), HaRav ("the Rabbi"), Moreinu HaRav ("our Teacher, the Rabbi"), Moreinu ("our Teacher"), Moreinu VeRabeinu HaRav ("our Teacher and our Rabbi, the Rabbi"), Moreinu VeRabeinu ("our Teacher and our Rabbi"), Rosh Yeshiva ("[the] Head [of the] Yeshiva"), Rosh HaYeshiva ("Head [of] the Yeshiva"), "Mashgiach" (for mashgiach ruchani; "spiritual supervisor"), Mora DeAsra ("Teacher [of] the place"), HaGaon ("the Genius"), Rebbe ("Rabbi"), HaTzadik ("the Righteous One"), "ADMOR" ("Adoneinu Moreinu VeRabeinu"; "our Master, our Teacher, and our Rabbi"), or Reb, which is a shortened form of rebbe that can be used by, or applied to, any married Jewish male as the situation applies.

A rebbetzin (a Yiddish usage common among Ashkenazim) or a rabbanit (in Hebrew and used among Sephardim) is the official "title" used for, or by, the wife of any Orthodox, Haredi, or Hasidic rabbi. Rebbetzin may also be used as an equivalent of Reb and is sometimes abbreviated as such, as well.

=== Non-Orthodox Judaism ===
==== Conservative Judaism ====
Conservative Judaism confers semikhah after the completion of a program in the codes of Jewish law and responsa in keeping with Jewish tradition. In addition to knowledge and mastery of the study of Talmud and Halakha, Conservative semikhah also requires that its rabbinical students receive intensive training in Tanakh, classical biblical commentaries, biblical criticism, Midrash, Kabbalah, and Hasidut (חסידות, '[works on] piety') the historical development of Judaism from antiquity to modernity, Jewish ethics, the halakhic methodology of Conservative responsa, classical and modern works of Jewish theology and philosophy, synagogue administration, pastoral care, chaplaincy, non-profit management, and navigating the modern world in a Jewish context. Entrance requirements to Conservative rabbinical study centers include a background within Jewish law and liturgy, familiarity with Rabbinic literature, Talmud, etc., ritual observance according to Conservative Halakha, and the completion of an undergraduate university degree. In accordance with national collegiate accreditation requirements, Conservative rabbinical students earn a Master of Arts in Rabbinic Literature in addition to receiving ordination. See List of rabbinical schools § Conservative

==== Reform Judaism ====
In Reform Judaism, rabbinic studies are mandated in pastoral care, the historical development of Judaism, and academic biblical criticism, in addition to the study of traditional rabbinic texts. Rabbinical students are also required to gain practical rabbinic experience by working at a congregation as a rabbinic intern during each year of study, starting from the first year. All Reform seminaries ordain women and openly LGBTQ people as rabbis and hazzans. See List of rabbinical schools § Reform

==== Seminaries unaffiliated with main denominations ====
There are numerous possibilities for receiving rabbinic ordination in addition to seminaries maintained by the large Jewish denominations. These are the Academy for Jewish Religion in New York City, AJR in California, ALEPH, the Jewish Renewal movement's online program, Hebrew College in Boston, and Hebrew Seminary in Illinois. The structure and curriculum of these are essentially the same as those at other non-Orthodox yeshivas.

More recently established are several non-traditional, and nondenominational (also called "transdenominational" or "postdenominational") seminaries. These grant semikhah with lesser requirements in terms of time and a modified curriculum, generally focusing on leadership and pastoral roles. These are Jewish Spiritual Leaders Institute, Rabbinical Seminary International, Pluralistic Rabbinical Seminary, and Ateret Tzvi. The Mesifta Adath Wolkowisk is aimed at community professionals with significant knowledge and experience, and provides a tailored curriculum to each candidate.

== Interdenominational recognition ==
Historically and until the present, recognition of a rabbi relates to a community's perception of the rabbi's competence to interpret Jewish law and act as a teacher on central matters within Judaism. More broadly speaking, it is also an issue of being a worthy successor to a sacred legacy. As a result, there have always been greater or lesser disputes about the legitimacy and authority of rabbis. Historical examples include Rabbinic Judaism's disputes with Samaritanism and Karaite Judaism. The divisions between Jewish denominations may have their most pronounced manifestation in whether rabbis from one denomination recognize the legitimacy or authority of rabbis in another.

As a general rule within Orthodox Judaism and among some in Conservative Judaism, rabbis are reluctant to accept the authority of other rabbis whose halakhic standards are not as strict as their own. In some cases, this leads to an outright rejection of the legitimacy of other rabbis; in others, a rabbi may be recognized as a spiritual leader of a particular community but may not be accepted as a credible authority on Jewish law.

The Orthodox rabbinical establishment rejects the validity of Conservative, Reform, and Reconstructionist rabbis on the grounds that their movements' teachings violate traditional Jewish tenets. Some Modern Orthodox rabbis are respectful toward non-Orthodox rabbis and focus on commonalities even as they disagree on the interpretation of some areas of Halakha (with Conservative rabbis) or the authority of Halakha (with Reform and Reconstructionist rabbis).

Conservative rabbis accept the legitimacy of Orthodox rabbis, though they are often critical of Orthodox positions. Although they would rarely look to Reform or Reconstructionist rabbis for halakhic decisions, they accept the legitimacy of these rabbis' religious leadership.

Reform and Reconstructionist rabbis, on the premise that all the main movements are legitimate expressions of Judaism, will accept the legitimacy of other rabbis' leadership. However, they will not accept their views on Jewish law, since Reform and Reconstructionists reject Halakha as binding.

These debates cause great problems for the recognition of Jewish marriages, conversions, and other life decisions that are touched by Jewish law. Orthodox rabbis do not recognize conversions by non-Orthodox rabbis. Conservative rabbis recognise all conversions done according to Halakha. Finally, the North American Reform and Reconstructionists recognize the Jewishness of patrilineal Jews—under certain circumstances—as a valid claim towards Judaism. In contrast, Conservative and Orthodox maintain the position expressed in the Talmud and halakhic literature that one can be a Jew only through matrilineality (i.e., being born to a Jewish mother) or through formal conversion to Judaism.

== Women rabbis ==
With rare exceptions, Jewish women have historically been excluded from serving as rabbis. This changed in the 1970s; coinciding with the shift in American society involving second-wave feminism, the Hebrew Union College-Jewish Institute of Religion began ordaining women as rabbis. Today, Jewish women serve as rabbis within all progressive branches of Judaism. In contrast, in Orthodox Judaism, women rabbis are a contested matter. However, many communities allow alternate clerical roles for women, such as Yoetzet Halacha. A variety of modern titles have been coined for female rabbis in Orthodox Judaism, including Rabbah (רבה), Rabbanit (רבנית), and Maharat (מהר״ת).

== See also ==
- Chief Rabbinate of Israel
- Hakham
- List of rabbis
- List of rabbinical schools
- Mashpia
- Posek
- Rav muvhak
- Reb (Yiddish)
- Talmid Chakham
