= Keshet (organization) =

Jewish LGBTQ organization

Coordinates: 42.3145051°N 71.1038443°W

Keshet Inc
- Formation: July 20, 2001
- Founder: Idit Klein
- Founded at: Jamaica Plain, Massachusetts
- Merger of: Jewish Mosaic: The National Center for Sexual and Gender Diversity, Keshet
- Type: 501(c)(3) nonprofit organization
- Tax ID no.: 48-1278664
- Headquarters: Newton, Massachusetts
- Location: Boston, New York City, San Francisco, Chicago, Florida, Texas
- Executive Director: Jaimie Krass
- Revenue: $6,577,240 (2023)
- Expenses: $4,818,138 (2023)
- Staff: 34 (2023)
- Volunteers: 35 (2023)
- Website: www.keshetonline.org

Keshet (Hebrew: קשת, romanized: keshet, lit. 'rainbow') is an American nonprofit organization that advocates for the equality and inclusion of LGBTQ+ Jews and their families in Jewish communities and institutions. The organization provides training and resources to Jewish institutions to support LGBTQ+-affirming practices, offers programs for LGBTQ+ Jewish youth, and engages in advocacy related to LGBTQ+ rights in the United States.

Keshet has offices in Boston, New York City, Chicago, Florida, Texas, and the San Francisco Bay Area.

== History ==
Keshet was founded in 1996 in Boston as a volunteer-run group by Jonathan Krasner and Jared Goldfarb. In 2001, Idit Klein became the organization’s first full-time employee.

In 2001, Keshet supported the establishment of a gay–straight alliance at the New Jewish High School in Waltham, Massachusetts. In 2005, it produced the documentary Hineini: Coming Out in a Jewish High School along with a companion curriculum.

Between 2004 and 2007, the organization worked to build support within the Jewish community for maintaining same-sex marriage in Massachusetts.

In 2010, Jewish Mosaic: The National Center for Sexual and Gender Diversity merged with Keshet; the combined organization retained the name Keshet, supported by a grant from the Charles and Lynn Schusterman Family Foundation.

In 2012, Keshet launched its first Shabbaton for LGBTQ+ and straight ally Jewish teens. In 2013, it partnered with Kar-Ben Publishing to release The Purim Superhero, one of the first Jewish children’s books featuring gay characters.

In 2018, Keshet organized statewide efforts among Jewish communities in Massachusetts in support of transgender rights.

Between 2021 and 2024, the organization opened offices in Florida and Texas, adding to existing locations in Boston, New York, Chicago, and the San Francisco Bay Area.

In 2022, Keshet launched Thrive: the Coalition to Defend Trans and LGBQ+ Youth, which includes more than 300 Jewish organizational partners.

In 2023, Keshet hired a full-time Jews of Color program manager. In 2024, it hosted a Shabbaton for LGBTQ+ Jews of color. In 2025, it released Threads of Identity: LGBTQ+ Jews of Color in the Fabric of Jewish Life, a report on the experiences of LGBTQ+ Jews of color in Jewish settings.

Also in 2025, Keshet, in partnership with the Hebrew Free Loan Society, created Move to Thrive, a loan fund for LGBTQ+ people relocating to safer states in response to anti-LGBTQ+ policies.

== National programs ==
=== Education & Training ===
Through individualized consultations, trainings, and Keshet’s cohort-based Shivyon: Keshet’s Equality Project, the Keshet Education & Training team provides Jewish institutions — synagogues, day schools, JCCs, federations, summer camps, and more — with tools to inspire and implement changes that foster LGBTQ+ equality. These changes have varied from the views of leaders and community members to an organization’s policies and programs.

=== Community Mobilization & LGBTQ+ Advocacy ===
As more anti-LGBTQ+ legislation and policies are introduced, Keshet is mobilizing Jewish communities nationwide to fight back. Keshet partners with Jewish organizations to prioritize LGBTQ+ equality within their social justice agendas and with secular LGBTQ+ movement partners to bring a Jewish voice to civil rights campaigns. Keshet has impacted the outcomes of a number of legislative initiatives, notably its support for Marriage Equality in the State of Massachusetts in 2004 and for Marriage Equally at the federal level in 2015, canvassing Jewish organizations and institutions to support the measures whenever a vote has arisen. Keshet has also voiced strong support for the Equality Act, the Respect for Marriage Act of 2022, and H.R. 2725, The Do No Harm Act of 2024. Other notable bills Keshet has opposed include H.R.734 - Protection of Women and Girls in Sports Act of 2023 and H.R.5 - Parents Bill of Rights Act of 2023. In 2024, Keshet successfully defeated 21 of 22 anti-LGBTQ+ state bills in coalition with their organizational partners in Florida.

=== Thrive: The Jewish Coalition to Defend Trans and LGBQ+ ===
Founded in collaboration with the Southern Jewish Resource Network for Gender & Sexual Diversity (SOJOURN), Thrive is a coalition for Jewish community institutions that want to protect and advance LGBTQ+ civil rights on both state and federal levels. Thrive has participated in multiple political campaigns, including advocating for the Respect for Marriage Act of 2022. As of 2025, there are over 330 member organizations.

=== Jews of Color Programming ===
Keshet offers programming and resources to cultivate communities of belonging for LGBTQ+ Jews of Color, including an annual weekend retreat, monthly online affinity spaces, and materials to help Jewish communities become stronger and more effective allies, and to welcome and affirm LGBTQ+ Jews of Color.

Keshet published Threads of Identity: LGBTQ+ Jews of Color in the Fabric of Jewish Life in February 2025, the first-of-its-kind study of the experiences of LGBTQ+ Jews of Color in Jewish spaces. The findings of the study highlight the lack of inclusion, support, and representation LGBTQ+ Jews of Color experience within the Jewish Community. The study was supported by the Jews of Color Initiative’s research grant, in particular the Jews of Color Initiative’s “Beyond the Count” research team.

=== Move to Thrive ===
In March 2025, Keshet and the Hebrew Free Loan Society partnered to create an interest-free loan program for LGBTQ+ people facing discrimination to help cover costs of relocation within the United States.

== Youth Programs ==
=== Keshet Youth Programs ===
Keshet offers a variety of programs and resources geared for LGBTQ+ Jewish youth and allies, including tweens (11-13), teens (13-18), and post-high school young people (18-24). The Youth Programs team runs annual weekend retreats, weekly online programs, local youth hangouts in Chicago and New York, and creates resources for youth-serving professionals to help them affirm and support LGBTQ+ Jewish youth.

=== Keshet Shabbaton ===
Keshet hosts LGBTQ+ & Ally Teen Shabbaton retreats, also known as Shabbat weekend retreats, for LGBTQ+ and ally Jewish teenagers ages 13-18. These retreats take place in regional locations throughout the United States.

== Leadership ==
From 2001 through mid 2025, Idit Klein served as the President & Chief Executive Officer of Keshet. Klein grew Keshet from a local organization with an annual budget of $42,000 to a national organization with offices in six states and a multi-million budget. In addition, she served as the executive producer of Keshet’s documentary film, “Hineini: Coming Out in a Jewish High School” which inspired the formation of GSAs in Jewish schools around the country.

As of August 1, 2025, Jaimie Krass succeeded Klein as Keshet President and CEO.

== See also ==
- Keshet Rabbis
