= Loans and interest in Judaism =

Jewish law on financial transactions

The subject of loans and interest in Judaism has a long and complex history. In the Hebrew Bible, the Book of Ezekiel classifies the charging of interest among the worst sins, denouncing it as an abomination and metaphorically portraying usurers as people who have shed the borrower's blood. (See Ezekiel 18:13 and 18:17.) The Talmud dwells on Ezekiel's condemnation of charging interest.

The Torah and Talmud encourage lending money without interest. But the halakha (Jewish law) that prescribes interest-free loans applies to loans made to other Jews, however not exclusively. Rabbi Isaac Abarbanel, however, declared that the acceptance of interest from non-Jews does not apply to Christians or Muslims, as their faith systems are also Abrahamic and therefore share a common ethical basis.

The Biblical Hebrew terms for interest are neshekh (Hebrew: נשך), literally meaning a bite, and marbit or tarbit (מרבית/תרבית), which refers to the lender's profit. Neshekh refers to interest deducted in advance from the loaned money given to the borrower; the words marbit and tarbit refer to interest added to the amount that the borrower must repay. In the Mishna and Talmud (ca 200 CE) The words marbit and tarbit, are often replaced by the word ribit (ריבית). The latter word is cognate to the Arabic word riba used in the Quran.

== In Tanakh ==
The Torah expresses regulations against the charging of interest in Exodus 22:24–26, Leviticus 25:36–37, and Deuteronomy 23:20–21. In Leviticus, loans themselves are encouraged, whether of money or food, emphasizing that they enable the poor to regain their independence. Like the other two places in the Bible, the charging of interest on the loan is forbidden.

Evidently the concept of secured loans existed, as Exodus expressly prohibits using a particular garment as the security. The garment in question was a large cloth square, which the poor used for sleeping within, and so the garment was needed to survive the cold nights; if it had been offered as security, this would have put at risk the very life of the debtor. The Deuteronomic verse expresses a similar concern for the security of the debtor's life, but rather than prohibiting a particular garment from becoming the security for a loan, it prohibits instead the use of a millstone. The millstone was used to make flour, and hence would be required for the manufacture of bread, a staple food among the poor; if the millstone had been offered as security, the debtor would have been at risk of starvation.

=== Historical context ===
Most early religious systems in the ancient Near East, and the secular codes arising from them, did not forbid usury. These societies regarded animate matter as alive, like plants, animals, and people, and it was considered capable of reproducing itself. Hence, if one lent "food money," or monetary tokens of any kind, it was legitimate to charge interest. Food money in the shape of olives, dates, seeds, or animals was lent out as early as c. 5000 BCE, if not earlier, and records indicate rates of 10–25 percent for silver and 20–35 percent for cereals. Among the Mesopotamians, Hittites, Phoenicians, and Egyptians, interest was legal and often fixed by the state. Among the Sumerians, loans were usually given with interest attached, at the rate of 20% per annum; this interest rate is almost always the one stated in surviving Sumerian contract tablets, and was evidently still well known in first century Judaism, as it is the first interest rate to which the Babylonian Talmud refers.

A more mutually profitable arrangement existed in Sumerian law, by which a lender and a debtor make contractual arrangements to become partners in a business venture, with the lender agreeing to invest in the venture, and the debtor agreeing to manage the venture; the bond thus has characteristics of both a loan and a trust, as the lender's financial share in the venture is effectively the return on the loan, and the debtor's financial share in the venture is effectively a wage. The Code of Hammurabi contains regulations attempting to govern the use of these contracts.

== In classical rabbinical literature ==
The Mishnah carefully tries to prevent evasion of the scriptural injunction against usury, preferring to forbid moral usury to trying to mitigate the scriptural rules in this area. According to the Talmud, the debtor would be as guilty as the lender, since it interprets one of the biblical verbs referring to usury, namely tashshik, to be in the causative voice; due to the Talmud's figurative interpretation of the lifnei iver regulation, it even regards any witnesses to usury contracts, as well as the scribe writing the contract for the parties, to be as culpable for usury as the lender and debtor themselves.

The Mishnah states that it is not permissible to withhold the whole of something such as a field, for which part of the selling price has already been paid, because any income arising from possession of the entity would effectively be interest on the outstanding amount. However, the Mishnah does permit the refusal to hand over something for which only partial payment has been received, if it had been sold on the terms that payment would be made by a certain date and that date has passed; in English Law, the mortgage was invented to take advantage of this exception.

If witnesses support a claim that it had been agreed to repay a debt by a certain date, but they are proved to be lying, and the correct repayment date to be a different date, according to the Mishnah, the false witnesses must pay the amount accrued due to the difference in value of the thing between the two dates.

The Mishnah forbids the drawing of interest and dividends from investments, arguing that people should instead buy land and draw income from it. The Mishnah also counts gifts, which aim to encourage the offering of loans, to be a form of interest, paid in advance; similarly, gifts given in thanks for a loan, are another form of interest, according to the Mishnah, even if the loan is repaid when the gift is offered. It even goes so far as to forbid the loaning of things other than money since by the time the loan had to be repaid, the market value of the loaned thing could have risen, which effectively constituted interest; likewise, the exchange of labour between two individuals was forbidden by the Mishnah, if the work by one of the individuals would be more laborious than the other.

According to the Mishnah, if a debtor has paid interest to his lender, it can be reclaimed if it is a form of interest explicitly prohibited by the biblical regulations, but not if it is prohibited only by the Mishnah itself; a dissenting view is, however, expressed by the Mishnah, stating that even the biblically prohibited forms of interest cannot be reclaimed legally. The Mishnaic justification given for the latter view is that the biblical text invokes divine vengeance against usurers, and civil action cannot be launched against someone under the penalty of death; effectively this meant that rabbinical courts made judgements in cases of usury, but refused to enforce them by anything other than physical attacks against the lender's body.

=== Heter Iska ===
The Mishnah forbids arrangements where a supplier gives a product to a shopkeeper to sell in return for a portion of the profit, since it views the supplier as effectively loaning the product to the shopkeeper, while ignoring the fact that the shopkeeper takes on the risk of theft, depreciation, and accidents. However, the Mishnah argues that it would not be counted as usury if the supplier employed the shopkeeper to sell the product, even if the wage was merely nominal, such as a single dry fig; this mechanism to permit profit being gained by a lender, in a business transaction between lender and debtor, was formalised as the Heter Iska, literally meaning exemption contract, which worked in exactly the same way as the earlier Sumerian business partnership contract between lender and debtor. Like all contracts, there are sometimes disputes, and the parties may resort to secular courts, running the risk of the court imposing interest, or other conditions which are contrary to Halakhic principles.

=== Other evasions ===
There were also a number of methods of evading the anti-usury laws completely, identified in the Mishnah. One of the simplest methods was for a person to lend something to another and buy it back from them at a reduced price (the purchase, of course, is independent of the loan); the Mishnaic regulations do not prevent the lender from requiring the full value of the loaned thing to be returned and so allows the lender to make a profit from the difference between the reduced price and the actual worth of the loaned thing.

Another significant loophole in the law was the biblical permission to charge interest on loans to non-Israelites, since this made it possible for an Israelite to charge interest on a loan to another Israelite, by making the loan through a third party who was not an Israelite; interest could be charged on the loan to the non-Israelite, who could then loan the money to the other Israelite at a similar rate of interest.

== In rabbinical literature of the Middle Ages ==
In the view of Maimonides, there were certain conditions similar to interest which were permitted. For example, Maimonides states that a person can offer money to a second person attaching a requirement for the second person to give a certain larger amount of money to a third person, or a requirement for the second person to persuade a third person to lend a certain larger amount of money to the first person. When a non-Jew was involved, Maimonides argues that interest should be charged; indeed, Maimonides argues that it was compulsory to charge interest on loans to non-Jews, but he also suggests that such loans should be restricted to being within narrow limits, to avoid the lender becoming so keen on usury that they practice it against other Jews.

The Shulchan Aruch, a 16th-century text that was published after the writings of Maimonides, and which is viewed by the majority of Orthodox Judaism as being authoritative, expresses a different view on interest, stating that it is now allowable (when it was written) to lend on interest to non-Jews. This text also records an exemption from the additional rabbinic restrictions for charities, such as orphans or poor-funds. Similarly, it allows the borrowing of money on terms involving interest repayments when a life is in danger.

In the opinion of the Shulchan Aruch, it is only the return of the capital part of a bond that is enforceable: if it covers the interest separately, the interest part is not enforcible, and if it combines the interest and capital into a single sum, the whole bond is unenforceable. Similarly, the Shulchan Aruch argues that if a guardian lends something belonging to their ward, and has charged interest on it, the ward may keep the interest and is not obliged to return it. The Shulchan Aruch even states that the courts can compel the restoration of interest only by flogging the lender until they are willing to return the amount, known as contempt so if the lender died before the interest was returned, the lender's heirs were allowed to keep the money.

== See also ==
- 613 mitzvot
- Gemach
- Hebrew Free Loan Society of New York
- Hebrew Free Loan Society of Greater Philadelphia
- International Association of Hebrew Free Loans
- Islamic banking and finance
- Money changer
- Prozbul (a Jewish writ making loans ineligible for cancellation)
- Shmita (seventh/last year of the Jewish agricultural cycle after which debts were forgiven)
- Sukuk
- Yad Sarah
- Yovel ("Jubilee" year at end of seven agricultural cycles)
