= Hebrew College =

American religious college

- Former name: Hebrew Teachers College
- Type: Private college
- Established: 1921
- Founder: Louis Hurwich
- Affiliations: Boston Theological Institute
- President: Rabbi Sharon Cohen Anisfeld
- Location: Newton Centre, Massachusetts, United States; 42.3256°N 71.1890°W
- Website: hebrewcollege.edu

Hebrew College is a private college of Jewish studies in Newton Centre, Massachusetts. Founded in 1921, the college conducts Jewish scholarship in a pluralistic, trans-denominational academic environment. Its president is Rabbi Sharon Cohen Anisfeld. Hebrew College offers undergraduate completion and graduate degrees, Hebrew-language training, a rabbinical school, a cantorial program and adult-learning and youth-education programs.

== History ==
Founded in November 1921, as the Hebrew Teachers College, Hebrew College was one of eleven Hebrew teachers colleges established in the United States in keeping with the Hebraist model of Jewish teacher training. Hebrew College was originally located in Roxbury, Massachusetts, and moved to Brookline, Massachusetts in 1952. The school opened with 23 students, with registration doubling by the following year. The founder of Hebrew College was Louis Hurwich, superintendent of the Bureau of Jewish Education of Boston. Nissan Touroff, former director of the Hebrew school system in Israel, was appointed as its first dean. The Hebrew High School ("Prozdor") opened in 1923.

Eisig Silberschlag became the dean of Hebrew College in 1947 and was named president in 1968.

In the early years, all classes, regardless of the subject matter, were taught in Hebrew. In the early 1980s, as Jewish studies programs opened at more colleges and universities around the country, the policy began to change. Increasingly, classes were held in English, and Hebrew was reserved for language courses and advanced Jewish text study.

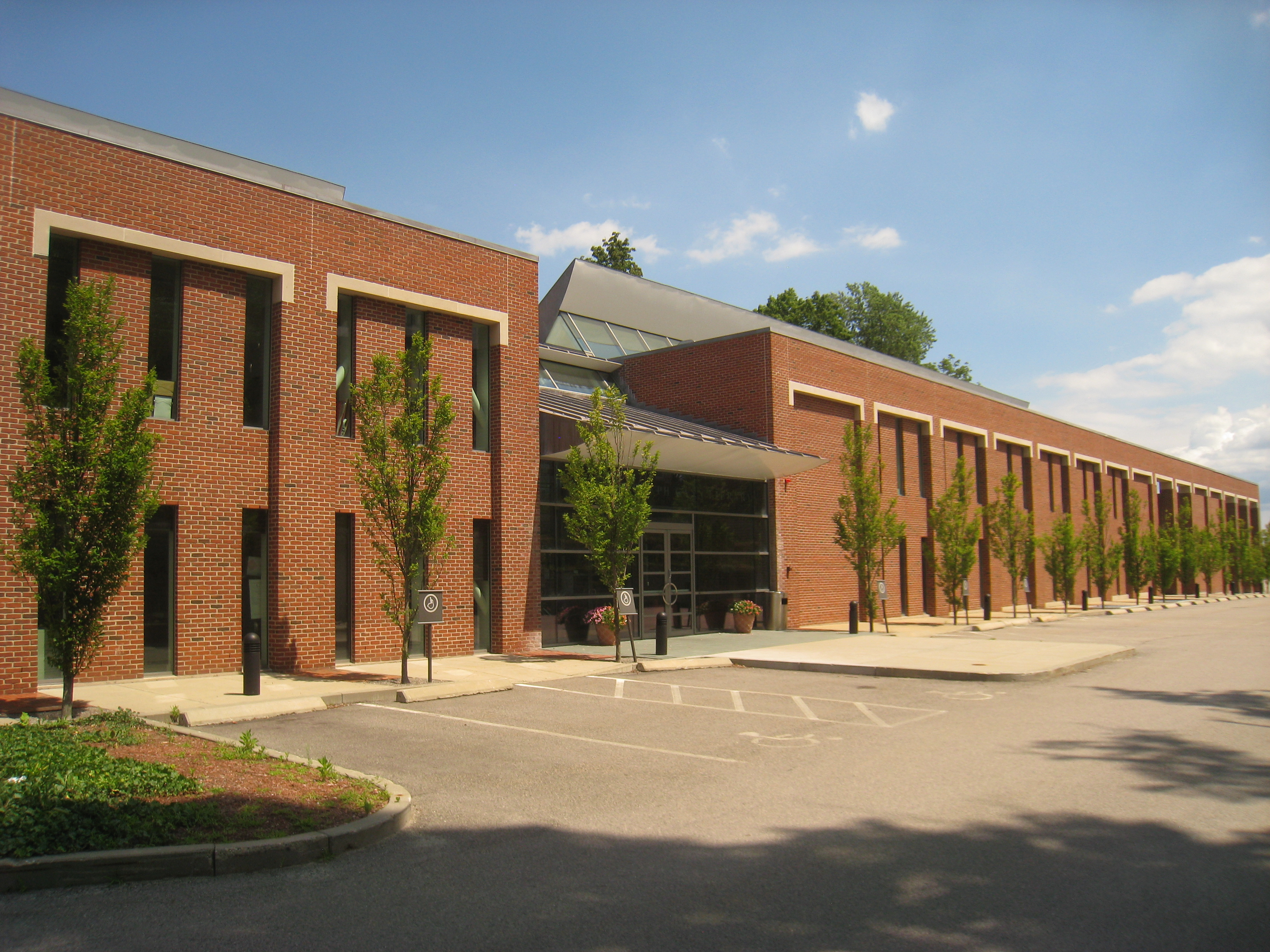

During the 15-year tenure of Eli Grad, the fifth president of Hebrew College, the focus moved from teacher training to an emphasis on Hebrew culture programs and courses for the wider community. In January 1987, after a period of decline, Samuel Schafler became the sixth president of Hebrew College and introduced new programming that expanded the student body significantly. In the late 1980s, adult education classes were introduced that became the forerunner of the Me'ah program. In 2001, Nehemia Polen established the Hasidic Texts Institute for the study of foundational Hasidic texts. In 1993, David M. Gordis became the seventh president of the College. Daniel Lehmann was appointed the eighth president in July 2008. Sharon Cohen Anisfeld became the ninth president in 2018.

Internationally renowned architect Moshe Safdie designed and built the institution's Newton, Massachusetts facilities, completed in 2002. Hebrew College successfully refinanced its real estate debt in 2012, reducing its original bond obligation by 75% and securing its ownership of the campus. In 2018 the campus was sold to a foundation associated with Hong Kong real estate investor Gerald Chan under a long-term lease-back arrangement.

In March 2021, Hebrew College announced an agreement with Temple Reyim, also located in Newton, to move the college to the temple property and share facilities. The other groups intending to co-locate are the Jewish Arts Collaborative; the Jewish Women’s Archive; and Keshet, an organization for LGBTQ Jews.

== Academic partnerships ==
In 2011, Hebrew College became a member of the Boston Theological Institute, a consortium of 10 theological schools and seminaries in the Boston area, including Boston University, Andover Newton Theological School, Boston College, Episcopal Divinity School, Gordon Conwell Theological Seminary, Harvard University, Holy Cross Greek Orthodox School of Theology and St. John's Seminary. When Hebrew College moved to its new campus in 2002, cooperation with the nearby Andover Newton Theological School (ANTS) led to the creation of the Center for Inter-Religious and Communal Leadership Education and several interfaith programs. In 2014, it formed a partnership with Lesley University in Cambridge, Massachusetts, and collaborates in offering a Ph.D. in educational studies from Lesley with a specialization in Jewish educational leadership. Hebrew College has established a partnership with the Pardes Institute of Jewish Studies in Jerusalem to prepare Jewish Studies teachers for Jewish Day Schools in North America. It is also partnered with NETA Hebrew-as-a-second-language, co-offering with NETA three certificate programs for Hebrew language educators. In 2012, Hebrew College established a partnership with Boston University's School of Management to provide a certificate in nonprofit management for rabbis and rabbinical students.

Hebrew College and the Florence Melton School of Adult Jewish Learning Co-sponsored the Summit for Leaders in Adult Jewish Learning.

== Library facilities ==
The Rae and Joseph Gann Library has over 125,000 books, including special collections in modern Hebrew literature, Jewish medical ethics, Jewish education, Jewish genealogy, Holocaust studies, Hasidism, and Jewish children's literature. Through the Research Libraries Information Network students can access a database of 53 million books, journals, maps, records and cassettes drawn from Judaica collections across the United States. In addition, the College is a member of the BTI Library consortium and the Fenway Library Consortium, allowing access to local college, museum and public libraries.

== Youth programs ==
In keeping with the idea of Jewish education as a lifelong pursuit, Hebrew College runs Prozdor, a supplementary Hebrew high school, and Makor, a supplementary Hebrew middle school.

== Notable faculty ==
- Arthur Green

== Notable alumni ==
- Yael S. Feldman, class of 1976
- Michael Fishbane
- Paula Hyman
- Frank E. Manuel
- Jonathan Sarna
- Emanuel A. Schegloff
- Isadore Twersky
- Theodore White
- Arnold Band

== See also ==
- List of Jewish universities and colleges in the United States
