= HFLS =

HFLS may refer to:

- Hangzhou Foreign Languages School, public secondary school in Hangzhou, Zhejiang, China
- Hebrew Free Loan Society of New York, organization in New York City
