= Kalman Mann =

Israeli pulmonologist

- קלמן מן
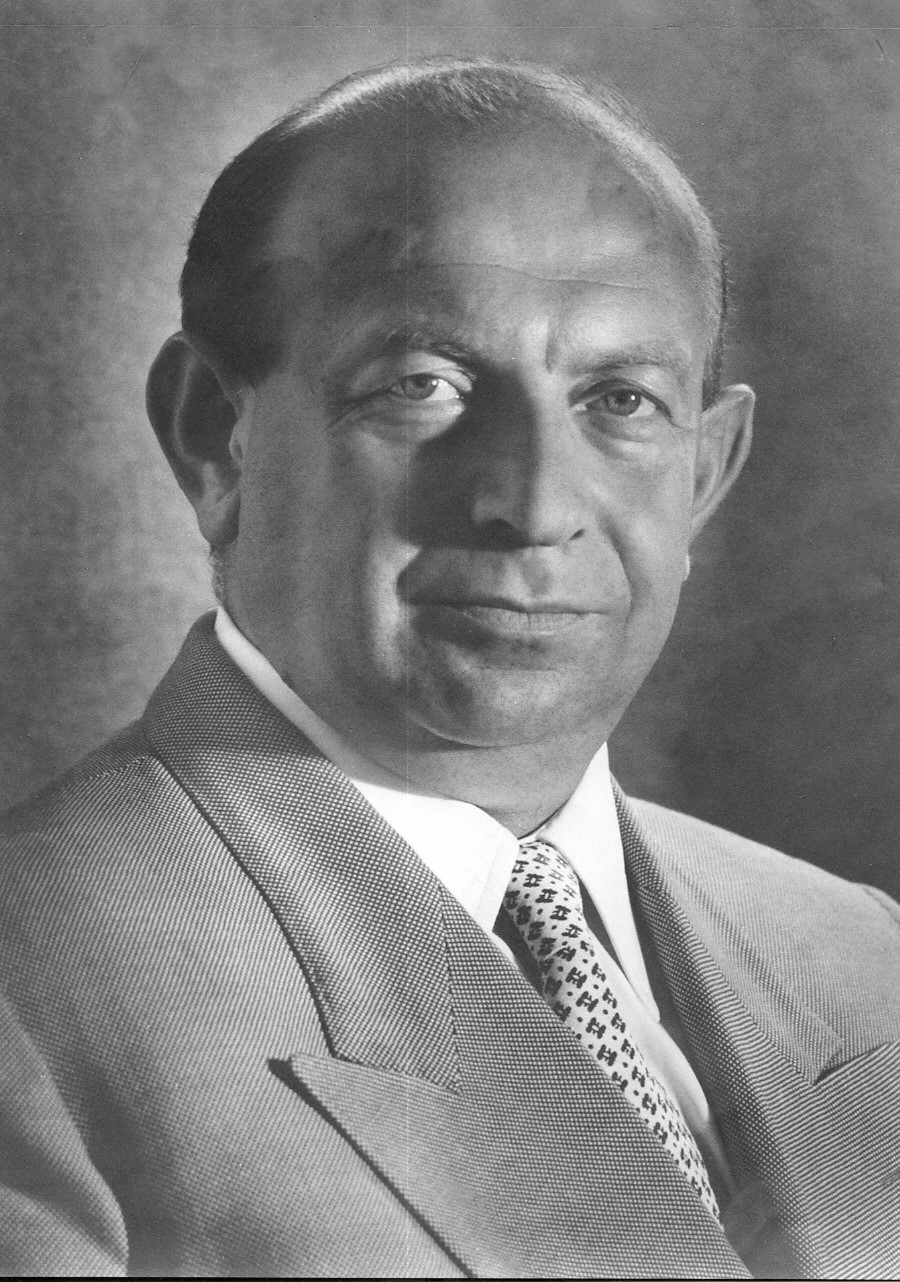
- Born: 5 July 1912; Jerusalem, Mandatory Palestine
- Died: 14 March 1997 (aged 84); Jerusalem, Israel
- Years active: 1951–1981
- Title: Director General
- Predecessor: Eli Davis
- Successor: Shmuel Penchas

Kalman Jacob Mann (Hebrew: קלמן יעקב מן; 5 July 1912 – 14 March 1997) was an Israeli physician specializing in pulmonology, and the eighth and longest-serving director general of the Hadassah Medical Organization. During his three decades at the helm of the Hadassah HMO, he was credited with the renovation of the hospital campus on Mount Scopus after the Six-Day War, and the construction of a new Hadassah medical center at Ein Kerem. He also sat on 14 different government committees, influencing Israeli health-care legislation. Following his retirement from Hadassah in 1981, Mann shepherded the development of the Yad Sarah medical equipment lending organization, serving as its chairman until his death in 1997.

== Early life and education ==
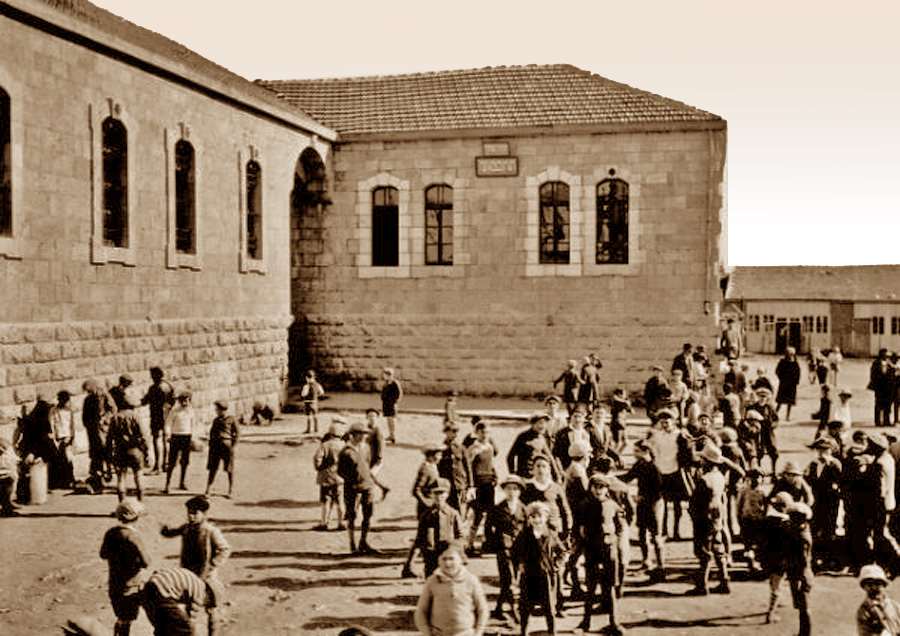
Tachkemoni School, Jerusalem, in the early 20th century

Kalman Jacob Mann was born in Jerusalem to Yitzhak David Mann and his wife, Chaya, both Orthodox Jews. He was the eldest of five children. On his father's side, he was a seventh-generation Jerusalemite. He received both a secular and a Talmudic education during his youth, studying in the Tachkemoni School and earning a teacher's diploma at the Mizrahi Teachers Seminary. I'm 1931, Mann started studying economics at the London School of Economics as requested by his dad even though Mann wanted to study medicine. With limited English proficiency, Mann passed the university entrance exam, but three months into the term he asked his father to switch to medicine. His father agreed, whereupon Mann completed his preliminary studies at Chelsea Polytechnic and, that same year, entered University College Hospital Medical School. In 1937, he received a double degree in Bachelor of Medicine and Bachelor of Surgery, and was accepted as a member of the Royal College of Surgeons.

== House physician ==
After graduation, Mann was named a house physician at the University College Hospital and spent two years attending to patients in the pulmonology department of various London hospitals. In 1939, he received his Doctor of Medicine degree as well as a diploma in tropical medicine and hygiene from the University of London. He also qualified as a member of the Royal College of Physicians. In 1940, Mann married his first wife, Sylvia Gamse. He was drafted into the emergency medical corps during World War II and served as a resuscitation officer at RAF Hendon, where he tended to pulmonary cases. Post-war, he worked for two years as a research physician at the Pneumoconiosis Research Unit in Penarth, Wales.

Mann became involved in Zionist activities as chairman of the Friends of the Jerusalem University in Cardiff, and chairman of the Zionist organization in Queensbury, London.

== Hadassah Director General ==
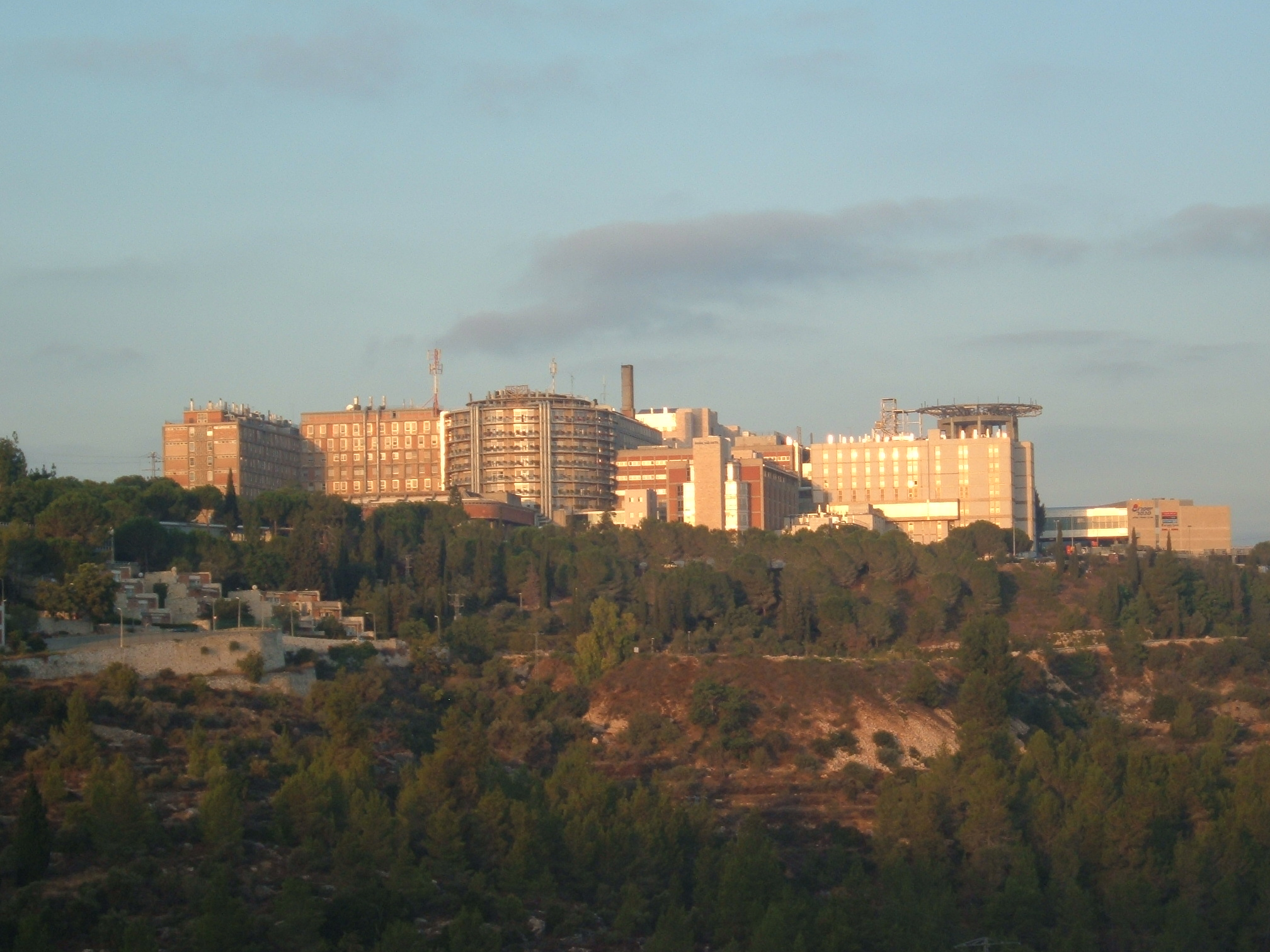
Hadassah Ein Kerem campus

In 1949, Mann returned to Jerusalem with his wife and two children and accepted a medical post at Hadassah Hospital. That year, however, the campus on Mount Scopus was cut off from the rest of Jerusalem by the 1949 Armistice Agreements, and hospital departments and clinics had taken up residence in a series of derelict buildings in western Jerusalem. Mann was instead offered an administrative position as deputy to the director general of Hadassah, Eli Davis, which he accepted. Mann was sent to Rochester, New York to receive training in hospital administration from Dr. E. M. Bluestone, former medical director of Hadassah. In early 1951, when Davis announced his resignation to return to general practice, Mann was named his successor.

Mann proved to be a visionary director and successful fund-raiser, turning Hadassah from an institution crippled by war to one of the world's leading centers of medicine, teaching, and research. One of his first efforts was to locate a new campus for the hospital and raise the millions of dollars necessary to build it. The 600-bed hospital at Ein Kerem opened in May 1961. Mann also opened four out of the eventual five professional schools on that campus: pharmacology, dentistry, occupational therapy, and public health.

On June 6, 1967, a day after Israel gained Mount Scopus in the Six-Day War, Jerusalem Mayor Teddy Kollek called Mann and told him, "If you want your hospital, come and get it". Over the next eight years, Mann supervised the renovation of the Mount Scopus campus into a 300-bed medical center. He also developed a "community based outreach health centre" at Kiryat Yovel.

Over his three decades of leadership, Mann managed a budget that increased from $2.3 million to $93 million. He collected most of the funds for his projects from Hadassah, the Women’s Zionist Organization of America.

== Yad Sarah ==
Mann retired from Hadassah on September 1, 1981, making him the longest-serving director general of the HMO; serving under ten presidents. He immediately undertook a full-time position as chairman of the Yad Sarah medical equipment lending organization, with which he had been involved on a volunteer basis since 1977. Mann's advice and expertise helped grow Yad Sarah from a neighborhood gemach into a nationwide home care equipment-lending organization with 72 branches and 4,200 volunteers by 1995. As of 2013, the organization has over 100 branches and 6,000 volunteers, and saves the government an estimated $400 million annually in hospitalization expenses. After his death, Mann's son, Professor Jonathan Mann, became a member of the Yad Sarah presidium.

== Other activities and affiliations ==
Mann was a member of 14 government committees convened on various aspects of health care, serving as chairman of five of them – thus wielding significant influence on health care legislation. Among those committees were the Supreme Medical Council and the Advisory Council for Matters of Preventative Medicine.

In 1970, Mann was accepted as a Fellow of the Royal College of Physicians.

In 1994, Manfred Wasserman conducted an oral history project with Mann, taping the former director general for more than 17 hours and compiling his memories in the book Kalman Jacob Mann: Reflections on a life in health care (Rubin Mass).

== Personal life ==
Mann married his first wife, Sylvia, in London in 1940. They had four children. He married his second wife, Bluma, on January 16, 1995.

Kalman and Bluma were seriously injured in two automobile accidents, one on April 24, 1996, and a second on February 28, 1997. Mann died of his injuries from the second accident on March 14, 1997, at the Hadassah Medical Center at Ein Kerem.

== Bibliography ==
- Wasserman, Manfred (1994). Kalman Jacob Mann: Reflections on a life in health care — An oral history memoir. Rubin Mass Ltd. ISBN 9789650901264.
- Mann, Kalman (1967). Sickness Absenteeism in a Medical Organization.
- Mann, Kalman (1965). "The Progress of Disabled Veterans: A study of disability following military injuries in Israel". Archives of Environmental Health. 10: 754–60. doi:10.1080/00039896.1965.10664086. PMID 14280201.

== Sources ==
- Levin, Marlin (2002). It Takes a Dream: The story of Hadassah. Gefen Publishing House Ltd. ISBN 9652293008.
