= Daniel Lehmann =

Jewish Rabbi and theologian

Rabbi Daniel L. Lehmann (born May 14, 1962) was the President of the Graduate Theological Union (GTU) in Berkeley, CA from August 1, 2018 until February 2020. Upon his appointment, Lehmann became the first non-Christian to lead the GTU. Previously Lehman served as the eighth president of Hebrew College in Newton, MA and served as the board chair for the Boston Theological Institute.

Lehmann received his undergraduate degree in philosophy from Yeshiva College where he was awarded the Prof. David Mirsky award in Talmud as well as the Torah Umada award for exemplifying the ideals of Yeshiva College. He went on to earn rabbinic ordination from The Rabbi Isaac Elchanan Theological Seminary, an affiliate of Yeshiva University. He also earned a Ph.D. in Education and Jewish Studies from New York University. Between 1996 and 2007 Lehmann was the founding Headmaster of Gann Academy, The New Jewish High School of Greater Boston and the founding Director of the Berkshire Institute for Music and Arts (BIMA). Prior to moving to Boston in 1996, Lehmann was the Upper School Principal at the Beth Tfiloh Community Day School in Pikesville Maryland. He had previously served as the Dean of Jewish Studies at the school and the assistant rabbi for the Beth Tfiloh congregation. While a student at Yeshiva University, Lehmann helped establish and led the KIRUV program, a Jewish educational outreach program for college students that was sponsored by the Rabbinical Council of America and Yeshiva University.

Lehmann received the Covenant Foundation award for Jewish education in 2001 and that same year received the Benjamin Shevach award in Jewish educational leadership from Hebrew College. In 2016 he received the Rabbinic award from CJP, the Jewish Federation of Greater Boston. He has studied and taught at the Shalom Hartman Institute where he co-founded the Training Institute for Community High Schools of North America, the Melamdim Jewish day school teacher training program, and the Hevruta Gap year program, a partnership between Hebrew College and the Shalom Hartman Institute. He has also studied and taught at the Center for Learning and Leadership (CLAL) founded by Rabbi Irving Greenberg, where he was a Wexner Heritage Foundation fellow.

During his years at Gann Academy, Lehmann established the North American Association of Jewish High Schools as well as the national Moot Beit Din program, both were later merged with RAVSAK, the association of Jewish community day schools.
