= Parents' Bill of Rights =

Parents' Bill of Rights may refer to:

- Parents' Bill of Rights (Saskatchewan) 2023 piece of legislation amending the Saskatchewan Education Act
- Ohio House Bill 8 (2023) which uses the title "Enact the Parents' Bill of Rights"
- PROTECT Kids Act which was introduced as "H.R.5 - Parents Bill of Rights Act"

== See also ==
- Florida Parental Rights in Education Act
