= Rodney L. Petersen =

American scholar (born 1949)

Rodney Lawrence Petersen is an American scholar in the area of history, ethics, and religious conflict.

He moved to the Boston area from Switzerland in 1990 and worked as the executive director of the Boston Theological Institute. In addition to this work with the BTI, he teaches in both the member schools and overseas. Together with BTI colleagues these courses have taken students to various regions of the world in order to understand and film ways in which faith communities are implicated in regional violence and how they can be avenues of reconciliation.

After growing up in the Chicago area, he received his B.A. from Harvard College, a Master of Divinity from Harvard Divinity School, and a Master of Theology degree also from Harvard Divinity School. His doctorate in history was awarded by Princeton Theological Seminary. He continued his education in Europe at Institut Oecuménique (Geneva, Switzerland), and Institut d'Histoire de la Réformation, Université de Genève.

His early work history included teaching at Trinity Evangelical Divinity School (Deerfield, Illinois), Webster University (Geneva, Switzerland), and with the Fédération des Institutions établies à Genève (FIIG). He also worked with churches in France and Eastern Europe, primarily Romania.

Now he is an ordained minister in the Presbyterian Church, U.S.A., serving on several of their committees and served for seven years as the pastor of the Allston Congregational Church (U.C.C.). He is a member of the Board of Directors of the Massachusetts Council of Churches, the Lord's Day Alliance of the US, the Massachusetts Commission on Christian Unity, the Refugee Immigration Ministry, the Board of Church and Prison, Sec/tres. American Society of Missiology (Eastern Fellowship), and numerous other academic and ecclesiastical organizations.

== Works ==
He is author, editor/co-editor, or contributor of several articles and scholarly works including:

- The Philosophy of a Peasant (Interaction Books, 1979) (ISBN 0-932808-00-X)
- Preaching in the Last Days (Oxford University Press, 1993)
- Christianity and Civil Society: Theological Education for Public Life (Orbis Books, 1995)
- Consumption, Population, and Sustainability: Perspectives from Science and Religion (Washington, D. C.: Island Press, 1999), with accompanying video, “Living in Nature.”
- The Contentious Triangle: Church, State, and University. A Festschrift in Honor of Professor George H. Williams (with G. H. Williams and C. A. Pater) (Kirksville, MO: Truman University Press, 1999)
- Earth at Risk (Amherst: Humanity Books, 2000)
- Forgiveness and Reconciliation: Religion, Public Policy and Conflict Transformation (Philadelphia: Templeton Foundation Press, 2001, 2002)
- Theological Literacy for the 21st Century (Eerdmans Publishing Co., 2002).
- Antioch Agenda. Essays on the Restorative Church in Honor of Orlando E. Costas (New Delhi: ISPCK, 2007).
- Sabbath, Sunday and the Weekend (Grand Rapids, MI: Eerdmans, 2010).
- Overcoming Violence: Religion, Conflict and Peacebuilding with M. G. Simion and J. Jackson (Newton, MA: BTI, 2011).
- 2010 Boston: The Changing Contours of World Mission and Christianity (Eugene, OR: Pickwick Publications, 2012).
- History of Religion at Harvard, 3 vols. (Goettingen: Vandenhoeck & Ruprecht, 2014).
- Religion and Public Policy: Human Rights, Conflict, and Ethics (Cambridge, 2015). (editor)
- Revelation (Reformation Commentary on Scripture) (InterVarsity Press, 2025). Part of: Reformation Commentary on Scripture (24 books).
