= Luther Pennington =

American United Methodist pastor and politician

Member of the New Hampshire House of Representatives
- In office 1965–1966

Personal details
- Born: Luther Benson Pennington Jr. December 16, 1921 Plattsburgh, New York, U.S.
- Died: October 22, 2014 (aged 92) Lexington, Kentucky, U.S.
- Party: Republican
- Education: Boston University School of Theology
- Occupation: United Methodist pastor

Luther Benson Pennington Jr. (December 16, 1921 – October 22, 2014) was an American United Methodist pastor and politician. A member of the Republican Party, he served in the New Hampshire House of Representatives from 1965 to 1966.

== Life and career ==
Pennington was born in Plattsburgh, New York, the son of Luther Benson Pennington Sr. and Dovie Castleberry. He served in the armed forces during World War II, which after his discharge, he attended Boston University School of Theology, graduating in 1963. After graduating, he was ordained an elder in the New Hampshire Conference in 1964.

Pennington served in the New Hampshire House of Representatives from 1965 to 1966. After his service in the House, he served as a United Methodist pastor at several churches from 1966 to 1987.

== Death ==
Pennington died on October 22, 2014, at the Sayre Christian Village Healthcare Center in Lexington, Kentucky, at the age of 92.
