= Murphy Army Hospital =

- United States Army
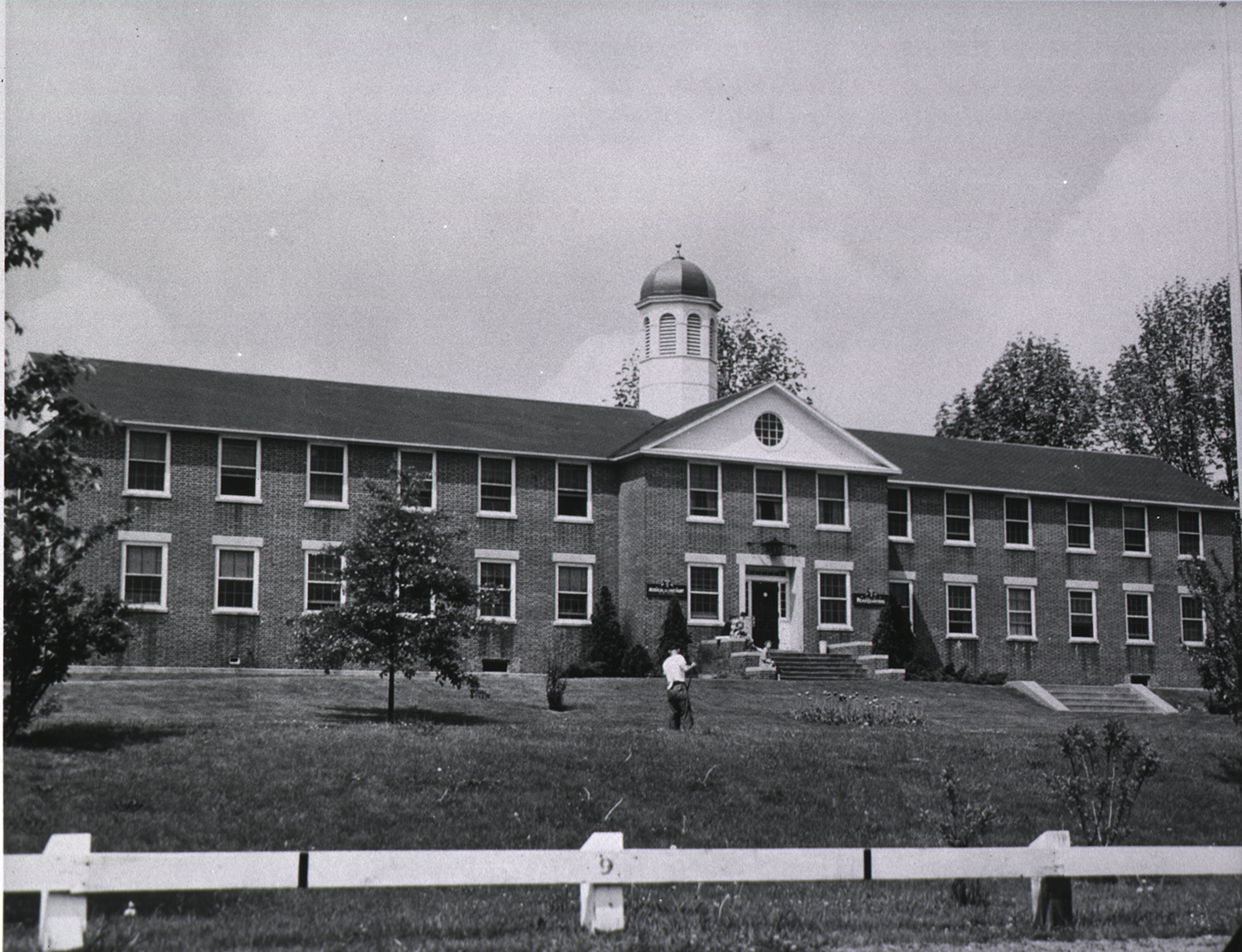
- Main building of Murphy Army Hospital

Geography
- Location: Waltham, Massachusetts, Massachusetts, United States
- Coordinates: 42°23′44.62″N 71°12′53.50″W

Organization
- Type: Military

Links
- Lists: Hospitals in Massachusetts

The Murphy Army Hospital is a former hospital in Waltham, Massachusetts. The hospital grounds, now demolished, is now home to Gann Academy, Bentley University Residence Halls, and City of Waltham Veterans Memorial Park- which contains sport facilities. During its operation, it was also home to a sports team called the Murphy Medics.

From June 1, 1949, to April 30, 1950, the hospital was the site of an experiment, ordered by the Surgeon General of the United States Army, Major General Raymond W. Bliss, to determine "to what extent women could be substituted for men in the operation of Army hospitals". During the 11-month period, 240 civilian women and members of the Women's Army Corps replaced men in the majority of medical and administrative jobs. However, no women Army doctors were available and "costs precluded the hospital's hiring of civilian women for the experiment."

There are several remains of Murphy Hospital still surviving. The main driveway to the Hospital off Trapelo road remains with original brown wood sign holders as well as a lamp post at the end of the roadway. One building from Murphy Hospital remains. The original hospital maintenance shop is still standing on property behind Gann Academy.

== See also ==
- List of military installations in Massachusetts
