= S. Clifton Ives =

Samuel Clifton Ives (born November 13, 1937) is a retired American bishop of the United Methodist Church, elected in 1992.

== Birth and family ==
Ives was born in Farmington, Maine. The son of a Methodist pastor, he lived in seven different Maine communities while growing up. He is married to Jane Petherbridge Ives. They have three grown children (Bonnie Marden, Stephen and Jonathan), and seven grandchildren. Ives enjoys running, gardening, swimming, sailing, skiing, carpentry, and mountain climbing.

== Education ==
Ives graduated from the University of Maine in 1960. He earned both an M.Div. degree (1963), and a D.Min. degree in Church and Society (1983) from Boston University School of Theology.

== Ordained ministry ==
Ives was ordained deacon (1961) and elder (1963) by bishop James K. Mathews. Rev. Ives served for thirty years in the Maine Annual Conference, including pastorates at Cape Elizabeth, Bangor, Waterville and Westbrook. In addition to his service as a pastor, Ives served as the Director of the Conference Council on Ministries (1973–76) and as Superintendent of the Southern District (1986–92).

Ives was elected a delegate from his Annual Conference to United Methodist Church Jurisdictional and General Conferences (1972–92). He also served on the Board of Directors of the U.M. General Board of Discipleship (1984–88), and for ten years was a member of the World Methodist Council. With his wife he has also been involved in marriage enrichment leadership since 1976.

== Episcopal ministry ==
Ives was elected to the episcopacy in 1992 by the Northeastern Jurisdictional Conference of the United Methodist Church. He was assigned to the West Virginia Episcopal Area (the West Virginia Annual Conference). As a bishop, he also served as vice-president of the U.M. General Commission on Religion and Race (1992–96). He also maintained a special interest in World Missions, which led him twice to Haiti with United Methodist Volunteers in Mission, as well as to Russia and Africa.

== See also ==
- List of bishops of the United Methodist Church
