= Boston University School of Theology =

Seminary at Boston University

Coordinates: 42.35°N 71.107°W

- Type: Private
- Established: 1839
- Parent institution: Boston University
- Affiliations: Boston Theological Interreligious Consortium, The United Methodist Church
- Dean: G. Sujin Pak
- Faculty: 39
- Location: 745 Commonwealth Avenue, Boston, Massachusetts, United States
- Campus: Urban
- Website: bu.edu/sth

The Boston University School of Theology (STH) is the oldest theological seminary of American Methodism and the founding school of Boston University, the largest private research university in New England. It is one of thirteen theological schools maintained by the United Methodist Church. BUSTH is a member of the Boston Theological Institute consortium.

== History ==
=== Prehistory ===
==== Vermont (1839–1847) ====
On April 24–25, 1839 a group of Methodist ministers and laymen met at the Old Bromfield Street Church in Boston and elected to establish a Methodist theological school. Following that vote, Osmon C. Baker, director of the Newbury Seminary, a high school and literary institution in Newbury, Vermont, started a biblical studies program at the seminary in 1840. It was named the Newbury Biblical Institute.

==== New Hampshire (1847–1867) ====
In 1847 a Congregational Society in Concord, New Hampshire, invited the Institute to relocate to Concord and made available a disused Congregational church building with a capacity of 1200 people. Other citizens of Concord covered the remodeling costs. One stipulation of the invitation was that the Institute remain in Concord for at least 20 years. The charter issued by New Hampshire designated the school the "Methodist General Biblical Institute," but it was commonly called the "Concord Biblical Institute." The school graduated its first class in 1850.

==== Massachusetts (1867–1871) ====
With the agreed twenty years coming to a close, the Trustees of the Concord Biblical Institute purchased 30 acres (120,000 m^{2}) on Aspinwall Hill in Brookline, Massachusetts as a possible relocation site. The Institute moved in 1867 to 23 Pinkney Street in Boston and received a Massachusetts Charter as the "Boston Theological Institute."

In 1869, three Trustees of the Boston Theological Institute obtained from the Massachusetts Legislature a charter for a university by name of "Boston University." These three were successful Boston businessmen and Methodist laymen, with a history of involvement in educational enterprises and became the Founders of Boston University. In 1871, the Boston Theological Institute was incorporated into Boston University as its first professional school, the Boston University School of Theology.

=== As part of Boston University (1871–present) ===
In 1876, Anna Oliver became the first woman to graduate from a Methodist seminary, receiving a Bachelor of Divinity from Boston University School of Theology.

Over the course of its history, the Boston University School of Theology played a central role in the development of the fields of philosophical theology (e.g. Boston Personalism), social ethics, missions and ecumenism, and pastoral psychology. Because of its roots in the egalitarianism of nineteenth-century Methodism, from its beginning the school admitted women and African-Americans for all degree programs. In 1880, Anna Howard Shaw, the second woman to graduate from the school, became the first woman ordained Elder in the Methodist Protestant Church, one of the forerunners of the United Methodist Church. As late as the 1960s, the vast majority of African-Americans with doctorates in religion were trained at Boston University. A study in 1983 showed that the largest number of doctoral dissertations in mission studies had been produced at Boston University.

== Centers and institutes ==
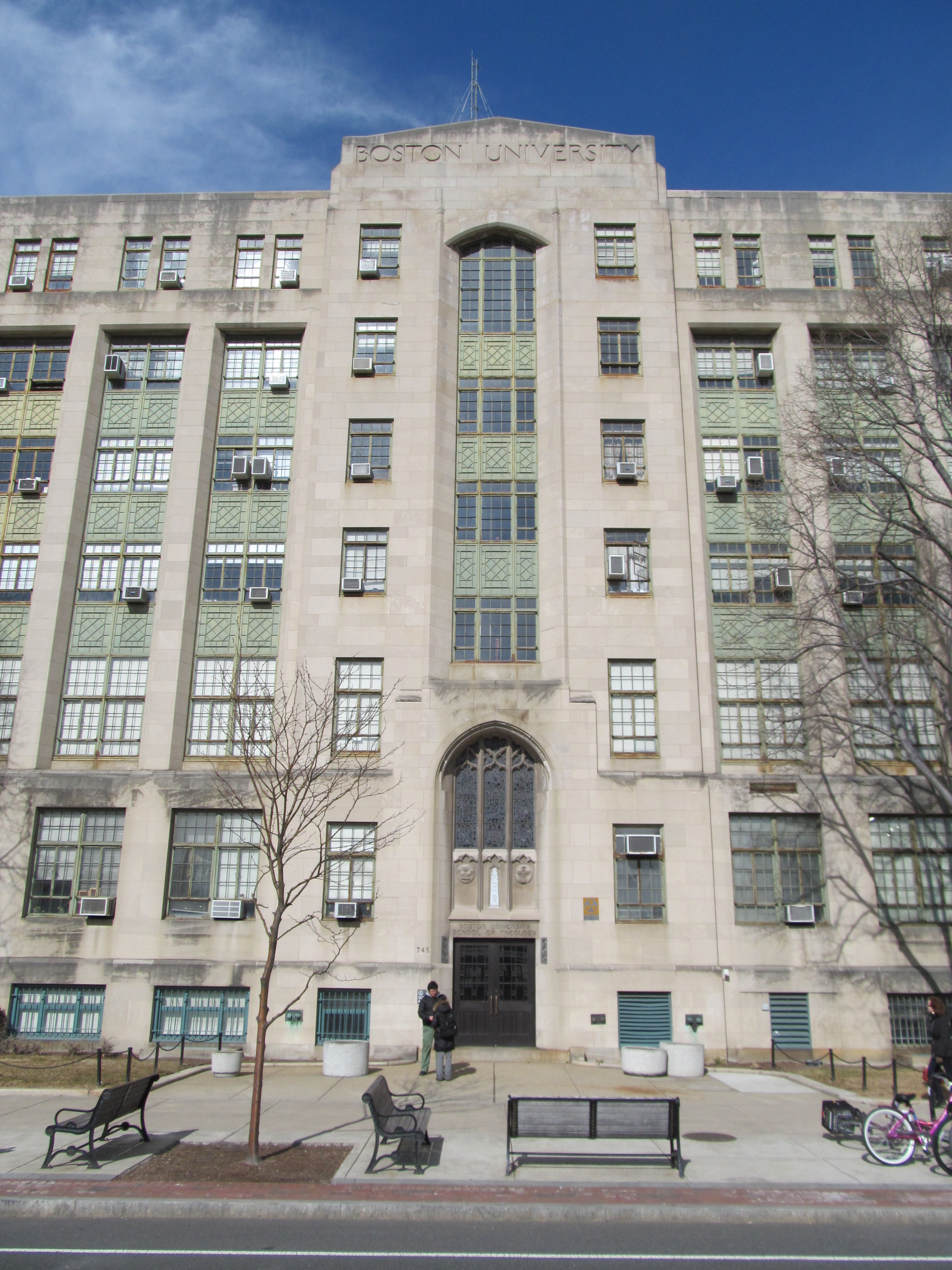
School of Theology

The following centers and institutes are affiliated with Boston University School of Theology:

- The Anna Howard Shaw Center: Director, Dr. Choi, Hee An
- The Center for Global Christianity and Mission: Director, Dr. Dana Robert
- The Center for Practical Theology: Co-Directors, Dr. Bryan Stone and Dr. Claire Wolfteich
- The Tom Porter Religion and Conflict Transformation Program: Dr. James McCarty

== Programs ==
The Boston University School of Theology includes several special academic programs, including one of only seven Master of Sacred Music (MSM) programs in the United States. The academic degrees offered are as follows:

First-level masters:

- Master of Divinity (M.Div.) - six semesters.
- Master of Theological Studies (MTS) - four semesters.
- Master of Sacred Music (MSM) - four semesters.

Second-level masters:

- Master of Sacred Theology (STM) - two semesters. (The STM in Military Chaplaincy was recently introduced, with a concentration in either Religion and Conflict Transformation or Trauma Healing.)

Doctoral:

- Doctor of Ministry (D.Min.)
- Doctor of Philosophy (Ph.D.) - in Practical Theology
- Doctor of Theology (Th.D.)- On December 18, 2013, Boston University approved the proposal of the faculty of the School of Theology to convert its Th.D. (Doctor of Theology) degree to a Ph.D. (Doctor of Philosophy) degree effective January 1, 2014.

Additionally, the following degree programs are available within the School of Theology and in conjunction with the Boston University School of Social Work:

- M.Div./Master of Social Work (MSW)
- MTS/MSW
- M.Div./MSM

The Ph.D. programs offered through the Division of Religious and Theological Studies (DRTS) at Boston University's Graduate School of Arts and Sciences share many students and faculty with the School of Theology.

== Academics ==
While the school has extremely strong faculty in all of these areas, BUSTH has a particularly strong reputation in several academic areas. These include religion and science; missiology and World Christianity; theology and philosophy; religion and conflict transformation; social and environmental ethics; and religion and counseling.

The Boston University School of Theology is a member of the Boston Theological Institute. Students at any of the eight member schools may enroll in classes at any other school.

== Notable faculty ==
This faculty information is current as of Fall 2025:

- Wesley J. Wildman
- Dana L. Robert
- Emilie Townes

== Notable alumni ==
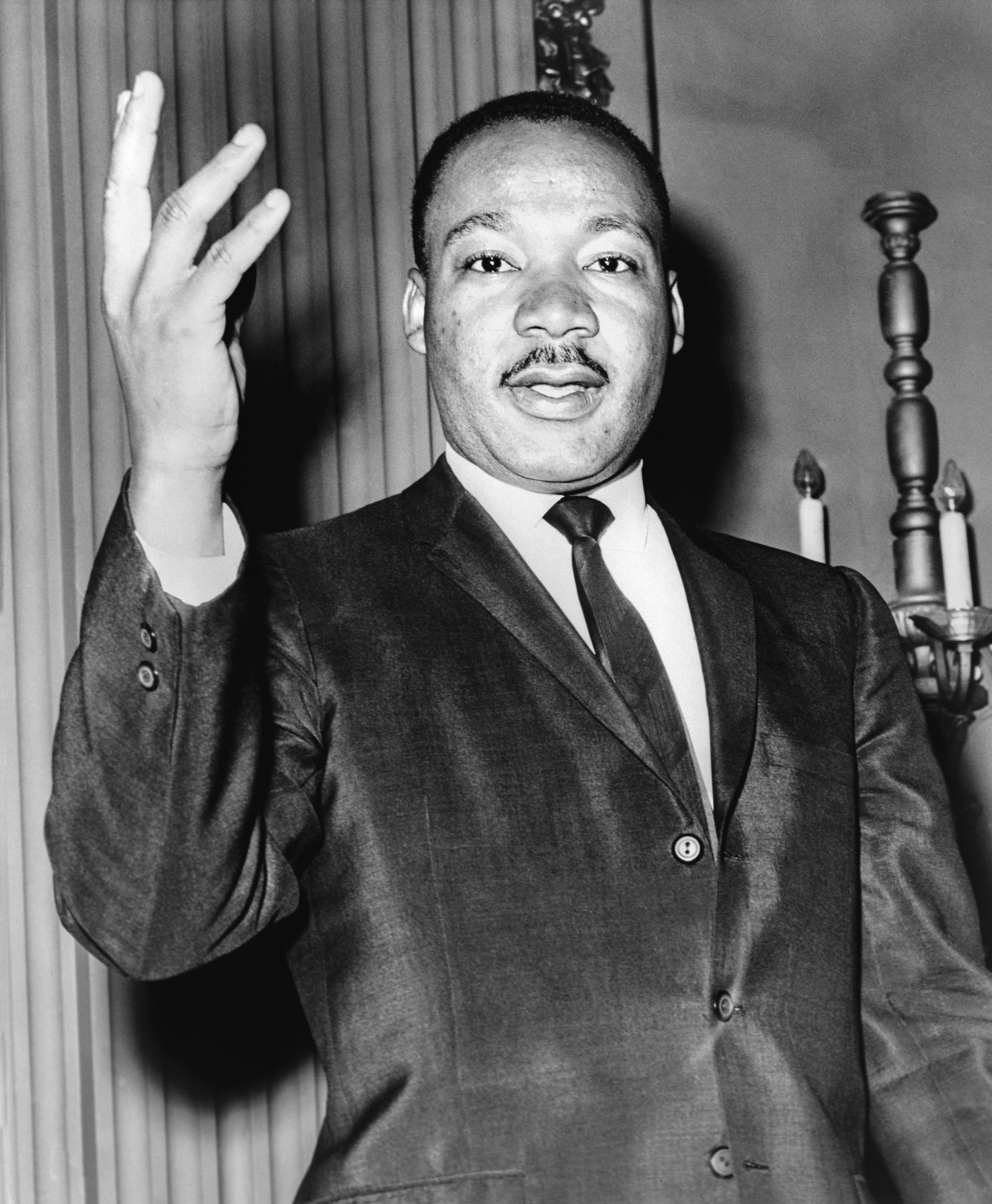
Martin Luther King Jr.

Prominent alumni of BUSTH include the following (arranged alphabetically):

- George Lincoln Blackwell, theologian and author
- Samuel Logan Brengle, Salvation Army theologian
- Cornell William Brooks, lawyer, activist and president of the NAACP
- Rev. Dr. Steven W. Brown, Homiletics professor and nationally syndicated broadcaster
- Chai-Sik Chung, social ethicist and sociologist of religion
- Ralph Edward Dodge, a Bishop of the Methodist Church in Rhodesia;
- Peter Deunov, Bulgarian theologian, spiritual leader and author
- Dr. James L. Farmer, Sr., first African-American from Texas to earn a doctorate
- George L. Fox, one of the four chaplains on the USAT Dorchester in WWII
- Catherine Gunsalus Gonzalez, author and Professor Emerita at Columbia Theological Seminary
- Dr. Georgia Harkness, Methodist theologian
- Edgar J. Helms, Methodist minister, founder of Goodwill Industries
- Dr. Carl F. H. Henry, theologian
- S. Clifton Ives, a Bishop of the United Methodist Church
- Martin Luther King Jr., BUSTH Ph.D., minister, civil rights activist and Nobel Peace Prize laureate
- James Lawson, activist, professor, and leading theoretician of nonviolence within the civil rights movement
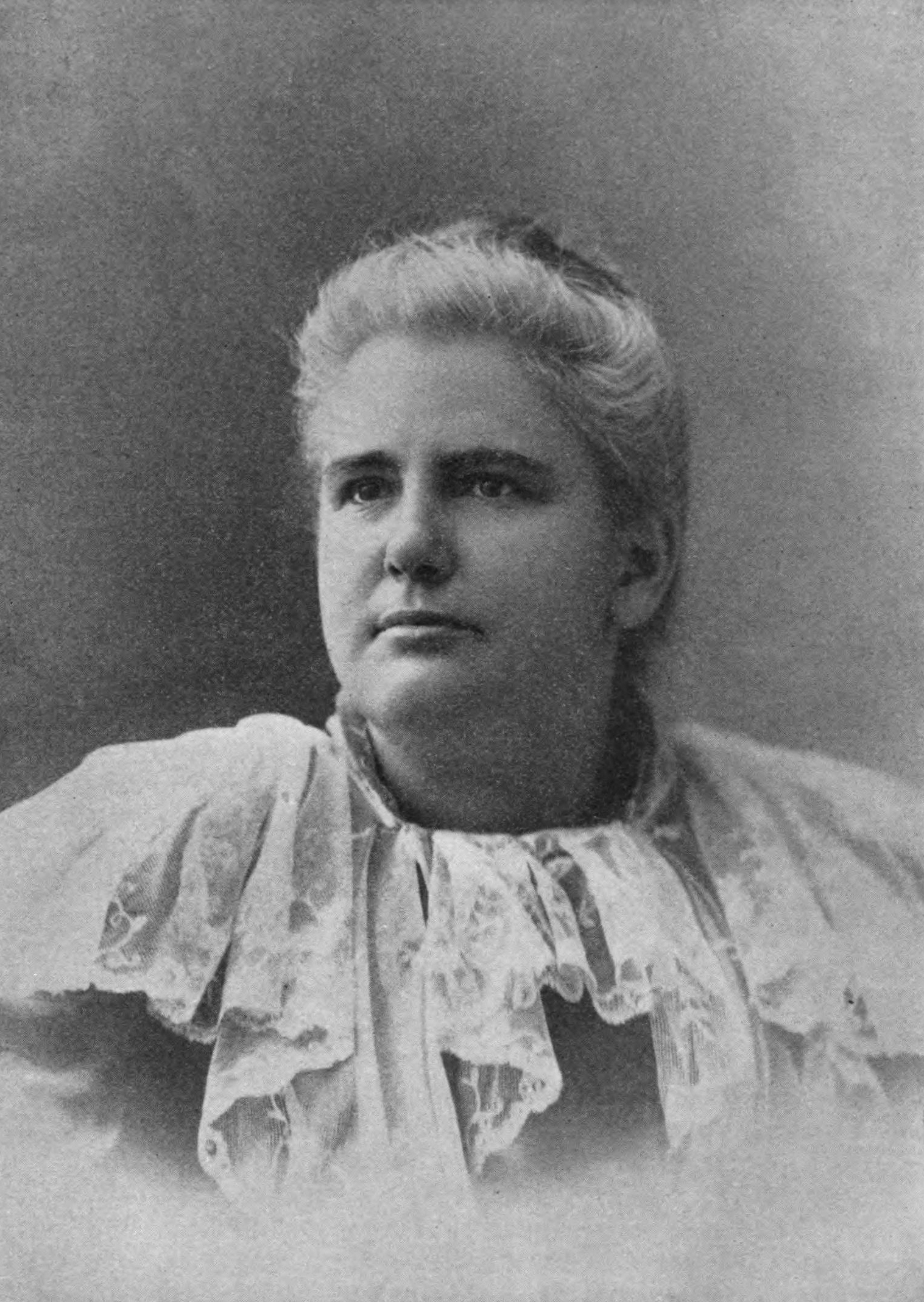
  Anna Howard Shaw
- Henry M. Loud, theologian and early lumber magnate
- Edgar Amos Love, a Bishop in the Methodist Episcopal Church and co-founder of Omega Psi Phi fraternity
- Walter G. Muelder, ecumenical leader, theorist of the "responsible society," and shaper of Christian social ethics
- Garfield Bromley Oxnam, a Bishop of the Methodist Episcopal Church
- Dr. Norman Vincent Peale, positive thinker and founder of Guideposts magazine
- Luther Pennington, United Methodist pastor and politician
- Samuel DeWitt Proctor, famous African-American preacher and civil rights leader
- John Hudson Riddick, AME preacher
- Dallas Lore Sharp, minister, university professor, and author
- Dr. Anna Howard Shaw, a leader of the movement of women's suffrage in the United States
- Katharine Lente Stevenson (1853–1919), temperance reformer, missionary, editor
- Woodie W. White, a Bishop of the United Methodist Church
- Rev Dr. J. Philip Wogaman, theologian, ethicist, professor, Dean, Wesley Theological Seminary, Senior Pastor Foundry Church
- Dr. Amos Yong, Pentecostal theologian

== Organizations and activities ==
BUSTH is host to a number of student groups and hosted organizations. All student groups operate within the Boston University Theological Students' Association (BUTSA), the school's student body government. Student groups include (arranged alphabetically):

- Association for Black Seminarians
- CAUSE: a group that promotes social and ecological justice
- Doctoral Student Association
- Sacred Worth: a student organization devoted to all individuals, regardless of gender or orientation
- Hispanic/Latino Student Association
- Korean Students Association
- MTS Club: weekly social group with an academic/philosophical interest in theology
- Seminary Singers: the service choir for Wednesday Chapel services
- Southern Fried Theologians
- thEcology: a group devoted to ecological justice and sustainability initiatives

== See also ==
- Boston University
- Boston Theological Institute
