= Seminary Singers =

The Seminary Singers of the Boston University School of Theology was begun in 1926 under the direction of James R. Houghton. It provides choral music for the Marsh Chapel at a weekly chapel service. The choir is non-audition based and is open to students, faculty, and staff of the University.

Approximately 30 singers form the choir, which also performs at special Boston University events. The group frequently performs at churches around New England, travels from which the group has recorded and produced several musical albums.
