= John Hudson Riddick =

American educator and religious leader (1848–1895)

- Born: April 1, 1848; Sunbury, North Carolina, U.S.
- Died: August 5, 1895 (aged 47); Chester Heights, Pennsylvania, U.S.
- Resting place: Olive Cemetery
- Occupations: Minister, educator
- Political party: Republican

Religious life
- Religion: African Methodist Episcopal

John Hudson Riddick (April 1, 1848 – August 5, 1895) was an educator, community leader, and minister in the African Methodist Episcopal (AME) church. In 1872 he was elected a member of the Norfolk, Virginia, city council. He was an AME minister at a number of churches and a leader in the Washington and Delaware Conferences of the church.

== Early life and education ==
John Hudson Riddick was born a slave on April 1, 1848, in Sunbury, North Carolina. He was owned by Rev. Isaac Riddick Hunter, and they moved to Norfolk, Virginia, in 1857. When the American Civil War (1861–1865) started, Riddick served his master as a body servant. Later he left Hunter and served as a hospital steward for the 7th New York Independent Light Artillery until 1864. In 1864 he served at the custom-house in Norfolk under Major J. H. Hudson. When Hudson was removed after the assassination of President Abraham Lincoln by his successor President Andrew Johnson, Riddick moved to northeast Pennsylvania and began studying theology under Samuel G. Ortor. He then moved to Boston, Massachusetts, and continued to study theology and medicine, and he graduated from Boston School of Theology.

== Career ==
In 1869 he returned to Virginia, where he practiced medicine for a short time. On July 4, 1869, he left medicine and became a minister. He served as a missionary under Bishop A. W. Waymen. In 1872 he was elected to the city council of Norfolk and appointed United States deputy marshal. He was later ordained by Bishop Edward Raymond Ames at Zoar M. E. Church in Philadelphia. Riddick was a respected leader in his community. By 1880 he had moved to Chestertown, Maryland, and he was a part of a push to hire black teachers for the black public schools in Baltimore in 1880. He was active in support of the Maryland temperance campaign of Frances Harper and William Daniel. and was chief in protest of the murders of African Americans in the Danville Massacre in 1883. He was a pastor of churches at Chestertown, Maryland, of Zoar M. E. Church in Philadelphia, of Ezion Church in Wilmington, Delaware, and of Bainbridge Street Church in Philadelphia, where he finished his career, retiring in April 1893.

=== Other activities ===
He also contributed to the journalism of the AME church, and was managing editor of the Conference Advocate and the Delaware Conference Bulletin. He was a prominent member of the Washington Conference and then the Delaware Conference of the AME church. He was active in the Grand Army of the Republic, a Civil War veterans organization.

== Personal life ==
Riddick married Amelia A. Riddick became sick from tuberculosis in April 1893. Ridick died in Chester Heights, Pennsylvania, on August 5, 1893. His funeral was at the Bainbridge Street Methodist Episcopal Church and buried at Olive Cemetery. He was survived by two children and his wife, who died April 4, 1895.
