= Ralph Edward Dodge =

- Bishop of Africa Central
- Church: The Methodist Church
- See: Africa
- In office: 1956–1968
- Predecessor: none
- Successor: Abel Tendekai Muzorewa

Orders
- Ordination: 1935

Personal details
- Born: January 25, 1907; Dickinson County, Iowa, United States
- Died: August 8, 2008 (aged 101); Inverness, Florida, United States

Ralph Edward Dodge (January 25, 1907 – August 8, 2008) was an American bishop of The Methodist Church and the United Methodist Church, elected in 1956. He was the youngest of four children of Ernest and Lizzie Longshore Dodge of Dickinson County, Iowa.

== Call ==
After high school graduation, Dodge followed his father and older brother into farming. The family attended the Methodist Episcopal Church in Terril, Iowa. It was there that his pastor suggested God might be calling Dodge to preach. In spite of scoffing at the idea initially, Dodge earnestly wrestled with the possibility for several years. Finally, he decided to pursue this call, trusting that if God willed it, seemingly impassable doors would open.

== Education ==
Dodge put himself through Taylor University, Upland, Indiana, by working for the university greenhouse and farm. While at Taylor, Dodge met Eunice Davis, a coed from Little Valley, New York. They married in June 1934. After graduation from Taylor, Dodge went on to Boston University School of Theology.

== Ordained ministry ==
After seminary graduation, Dodge served small churches in Massachusetts and North Dakota, but he and his wife both felt called to foreign missions work.

In 1935 they were accepted as candidates for a missionary opening in Angola, then called Portuguese West Africa. The birth of their first child in January 1936 delayed their departure but, a few months later, they were in language school in Lisbon, Portugal. They arrived in Portuguese West Africa December 1936.

== Episcopal ministry ==
Dodge was elected bishop in 1956, the first Methodist bishop elected by the Africa Central Conference. He was the only American Methodist missionary ever elected bishop by the Africa Central Conference, as well. Previously bishops to Africa had been appointed from America. During his time there, heh worked for racial equality and African leadership in the church. Dodge served as bishop in Africa until 1968, despite being expelled from the country in 1964 leading the African church through the turbulent years from colonial control to African leadership. His episcopal area included the colonial territories of Angola, Mozambique, Rhodesia (now Zimbabwe) and Zaire (now the Democratic Republic of the Congo).

Dodge's assistant Antonio Agostinho Neto went on to become the founder of the Movimento Popular de Libertacio de Angola MPLA, while Bishop Abel Muzorewa, who he helped sponsor for overseas study, became Prime Minister of Rhodesia.

Until his death on August 8, 2008, Dodge lived in retirement in Inverness, Florida.

== Publications ==
- The Unpopular Missionary, (1964)
- Rise Up and Walk, 1978
- The Pagan Church
- The Revolutionary Bishop

His papers are held at the Syracuse University library.

== Family ==
Dodge was married to Eunice Davies and they had four children; after Eunice's death in 1982, Dodge married Elizabeth Law.

== See also ==
- List of bishops of the United Methodist Church
