= International Association of Hebrew Free Loans =

Organization for Jewish interest-free loans

The International Association of Hebrew Free Loans (IAHFL) is an umbrella organization for Hebrew Free Loan societies, organizations that offer interest-free loans to Jews. There are members around the world, with most in North America. Each member organization has its own rules regarding such things as who may borrow, the maximum loan amount, and the repayment process. However, all offer loans without interest.

Hebrew Free Loan societies (such a society is also known as a Gemach) are based on the biblical injunction that Jews may not charge interest to other Jews in need, found in Exodus 22:25: "If you lend money to My people, to the poor among you, do not act towards them as a creditor; exact no interest from them."

The IAHFL provides a forum for independent free loan societies to interact, share information, and helps establish new Hebrew Free Loans. There is an annual conference hosted by a member organization.

== Hebrew Free Loan Association of Northeast Ohio ==
Hebrew Free Loan Association of Northeast Ohio
- Founded: September 1904; 122 years ago
- Founder: Charles Ettinger, Nathan L. Holstein, Max Kolinsky, Joseph Morgenstern, Samuel Rocker, Louis E. Siegelstein, Isaac Spectorsky
- Purpose: Interest-free lending
- Location: Cleveland, Ohio, U.S.
- Key people: David Edelman (President), Michal Marcus (Program Director)
- Employees: 2
- Website: interestfree.org

Hebrew Free Loan Association of Northeast Ohio (HFLA) is an American non-sectarian 501(c)(3) non-profit organization that loans money interest-free to people who do not have easy access to other capital.

In 1982, the Hebrew Free Loan Association of Northeast Ohio became an independent member of International Association of Hebrew Free Loans. As of 2014, the organization has made over 25,000 interest-free loans in Northeast Ohio. Between 97% and 99% of all funds loaned are repaid.

=== History ===
HFLA was founded in 1904 with $501 in capital donated by Morris A. Black, Charles Ettinger and Herman Stern. In the first year, loans ranged from $10 to $37 and were all repaid in full. In 1909, the organization made 700 loans, including 288 for peddling and huckstering, 86 for renting or purchasing horses and wagons, 119 for supply stores or pushcarts, 42 for starting a business, 62 for emigration purposes, 42 for hiring carpenters or painters, 18 for tools for mechanics, and 43 for tuition or other uses.

All loans are interest-free based on a Jewish biblical tradition. "If you go to the Torah, the highest form of tzedakah is not giving someone a gift of money, it's giving someone the ability to help themselves," said David Edelman, President of the Association. "Giving someone an interest-free loan is considered one of the highest forms of charity."

=== Loan program ===
HFLA offers interest-free loans of up to $10,000 to individuals who qualify: have an ability to pay the loan back, lack access to traditional financial products, and have a need that an interest-free loan could fill. Borrowers and co-signers must live in Northeast Ohio. One co-signer is required for every $4,000 that is borrowed. HFLA lends money for many purposes, including but not limited to:

- Medical and dental bills
- Home repairs
- Escaping predatory lending
- Apartment rental and deposits
- Home purchase closing costs
- Immigration
- Adoption
- Fertility treatments
- Camps
- Education, including vocational and job training

=== Awards ===
In 1984, HFLA received the Isaiah Award for Human Relations from the Cleveland Chapter of the American Jewish Committee.

== Hebrew Free Loan Society of Greater Philadelphia ==
The Hebrew Free Loan Society of Greater Philadelphia (HFLGP) provides interest-free loans to members of the Philadelphia Jewish community in need. Founded in 1984 as the Hebrew Free Loan Society at Beth Sholom and housed at Beth Sholom Congregation (Elkins Park, Pennsylvania), by 2006, over $2 million in loans had been granted from its revolving fund.

HFLGP is a member of the International Association of Hebrew Free Loans. It is a 501(c)(3) organization funded entirely by private donations.

=== General information ===
HFLGP offers loans of up to $7,500. Borrowers must live in the Philadelphia area, specifically Bucks, Chester, Delaware, Montgomery or Philadelphia counties in Pennsylvania, or Burlington, Camden, Gloucester or Mercer counties in New Jersey. Borrowers must be Jewish or serve the Jewish community.

Credit-worthy co-signers who live in Pennsylvania or New Jersey are required to guarantee repayment for all loans.

HFPGP lends money for many purposes, including but not limited to:

- Medical and dental bills
- Home repairs
- Apartment rental and deposits
- First home purchase closing costs
- Family member immigration
- Adoption
- Fertility treatments
- Jewish camp
- Unemployment
- Vocational and job training
- Education

=== Business loans ===
HFLGP offers interest-free loans up to $15,000 for new businesses or businesses changing their direction, though the R & B Business Loan Fund at Congregation Beth Or. Borrowers must live in the Philadelphia area, specifically Bucks, Chester, Delaware, Montgomery or Philadelphia counties in Pennsylvania, or Burlington, Camden, Gloucester or Mercer counties in New Jersey. Unlike HFLGP's personal loans, this loan program is non-sectarian.

Two credit-worthy co-signers who live in Pennsylvania or New Jersey are required to guarantee repayment for all loans.

=== History ===
Hebrew Free Loan Societies are based on the Biblical injunction "If you lend money to My people, to the poor among you, do not act towards them as a creditor; exact no interest from them." (Exodus 22:24) Jewish communities throughout history have included these organizations as one of the pillars of communal life.

The Hebrew Free Society of Greater Philadelphia was founded in 1984 through the efforts of Rabbi Aaron Landes z"l. Bernard and Marie Granor agreed to spearhead the original effort and Bernard served as President of the Society for more than 20 years.

== See also ==
- Aktsiye, which is a Jewish form of credit union
- Halakha
- Hebrew Free Loan Society of New York
- Loans and interest in Judaism

== Sources ==
- Jaffe, Eliezer David. Micro-Lending: A Nonprofit Response to Economic Crisis,
- Tenenbaum, Shelly (1993). A Credit to Their Community: Jewish Loan Societies in the United States 1880-1945. American Jewish Civilization Series. Detroit, Michigan: Wayne State University Press). ISBN 9780814322871. ISBN 0814322875.
- Weissman Joselit, Jenna (1992). Lending Dignity: The First One Hundred Years of the Hebrew Free Loan Society of New York. The Society. ASIN B0000D6LQ1.
