= Neta Hebrew =

Hebrew language curriculum for students

NETA (Hebrew: נוער לטובת העברית, No'ar leTovat ha'Ivrit), literally Youth in Favour of Hebrew, is a Hebrew language curriculum for students. Following the subsequent involvement of the Israeli Center for Educational Technology, the program was rebranded NETA–CET.

The curriculum is described as a more modern, "holistic" approach to the teaching of Hebrew, in response to perceived deficiencies in more traditional approaches used in Jewish day schools and other Hebrew language programs.

Research conducted at the Jewish Theological Seminary of America showed that the NETA curriculum did not appear to be an effective teaching method for students with learning disabilities.
