= Boston Theological Interreligious Consortium =

Coordinates: 42.325°N 71.1899°W

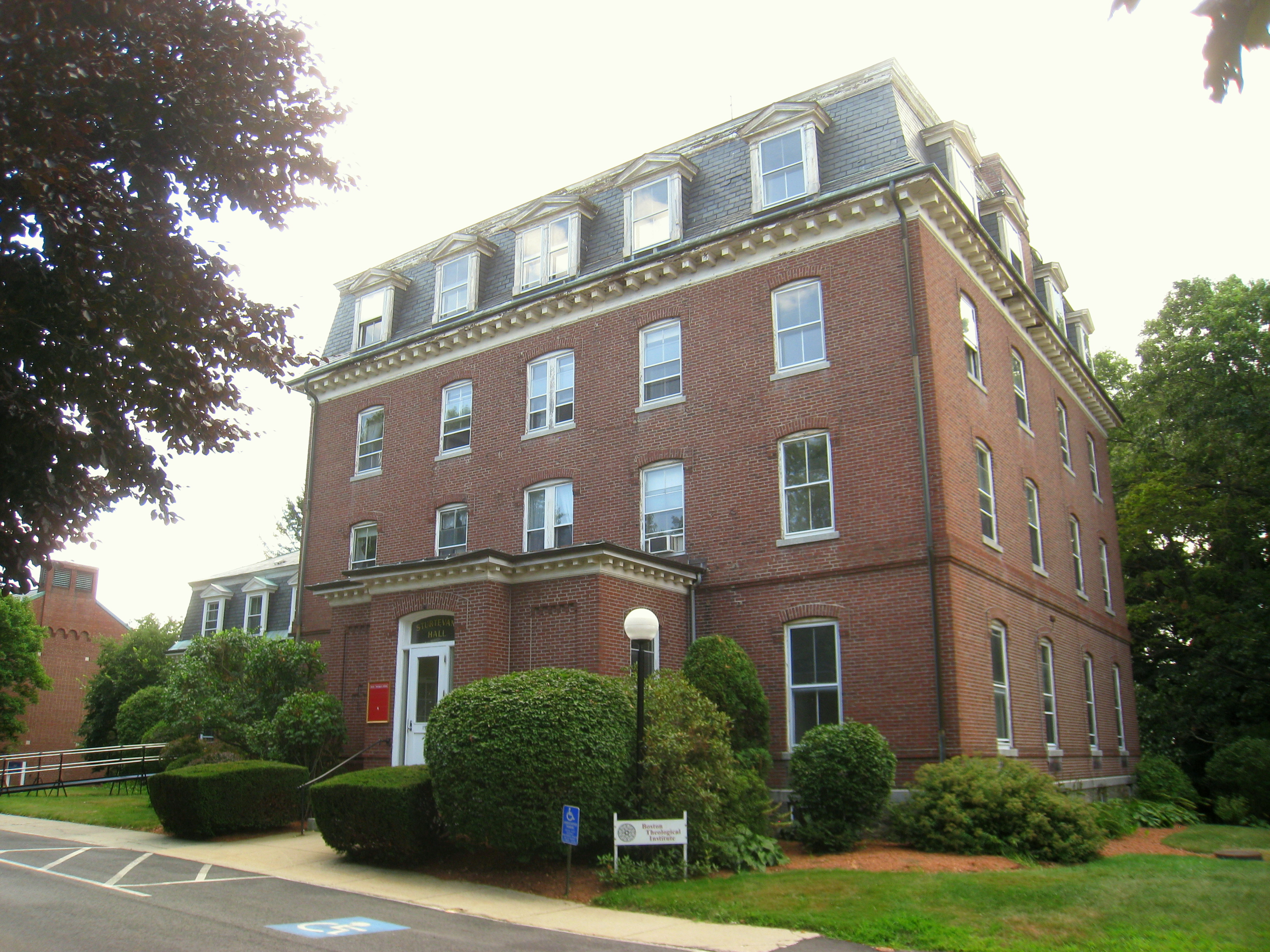
- Former names: Boston Theological Institute
- Established: 1968
- Location: Boston, Massachusetts, United States of America
- Website: bostontheological.org

The Boston Theological Interreligious Consortium (BTI), originally the Boston Theological Institute, is the largest theological consortium in the world, bringing together the resources of theological schools and seminaries throughout the greater Boston area. Its activities include facilitating cross-registration and library access among the member schools and supporting certificate programs and student-led conferences. The BTI is led by Stephanie Edwards, who has served as executive director since the summer of 2020, and by a board of trustees that represent its member schools.

== History ==
The Boston Theological Institute was formed in 1968 to facilitate collaboration and enable joint programming among seven graduate-level Christian theological schools in Greater Boston: Andover Newton Theological School (American Baptist Church), the Boston College Department of Theology (Roman Catholic), the Boston University School of Theology (United Methodist), Episcopal Theological School (later Episcopal Divinity School), Harvard Divinity School (interfaith), St. John's Seminary (Roman Catholic), and Weston College (now Boston College School of Theology and Ministry, Roman Catholic). Gordon-Conwell Theological Seminary (Evangelical) became a member of the consortium in 1972, and Holy Cross Greek Orthodox School of Theology in 1975.

On January 1, 2011, the BTI became a multifaith organization when Hebrew College joined the coalition. On January 1, 2018, the BTI expanded beyond Greater Boston when Hartford Seminary, a nondenominational seminary in Hartford, Connecticut, became a member. The Boston University Graduate Program in Religion became a member institution in 2020. Meanwhile, the Episcopal Divinity School ended its membership in the BTI after the closure of its Cambridge, Massachusetts campus, as did Andover Newton Theological School after its Newton, Massachusetts campus closed.

The BTI began using the name Boston Theological Interreligious Consortium in August 2018.

Past directors of the BTI include the Rev. Walter Wagoner, Sr. (1968 through the mid-1970s); Rodney L. Petersen (1990-2014); and Ann McClenahan (2014–20)
