= Yad Sarah =

Israeli national volunteer organization

- Formation: 1976; 50 years ago
- Type: Gemach
- Legal status: Non-profit
- Purpose: Loans of medical and rehabilitative equipment and other services for homebound and elderly
- Headquarters: Jerusalem, Israel
- Location: Israel
- Region served: Israel
- Official language: Hebrew
- President/Founder: Uri Lupolianski
- Affiliations: United Nations Department of Public Relations
- Budget: US$23 million
- Staff: 150
- Volunteers: 6,000
- Remarks: Awarded 1994 Israel Prize; Granted special advisory status to the United Nations Economic and Social Council

Yad Sarah (Hebrew: יד שרה) is the largest national volunteer organization in Israel. Employing over 6,000 volunteers, with a salaried staff of 150, Yad Sarah serves over 350,000 clients each year. It is best known for its free loans of over 244,000 pieces of medical and rehabilitative home-care equipment annually, enabling sick, disabled, elderly and recuperating patients to live at home. This saves the country's economy an estimated $320 million in hospital fees and long-term care costs each year.

According to an independent survey, one out of every two Israeli families has been helped by Yad Sarah. The organization serves Jews, Christians, Muslims and Druze, as well as tourists with disabilities. Its menu of free or nominal-fee services include lending of medical and rehabilitative equipment, oxygen service, wheelchair transportation, national emergency alarm system, services for the homebound, legal aid for the elderly, geriatric dentistry, day rehabilitation centers, a play center for special needs children, and an education and recreation club for retirees. Yad Sarah receives no government funding, but relies on donations to meet its $23 million operating budget. It exports its expertise to developing countries and has established similar models in various countries. Yad Sarah is a recipient of the Israel Prize and has been awarded advisory status to the United Nations Economic and Social Council.

== History ==
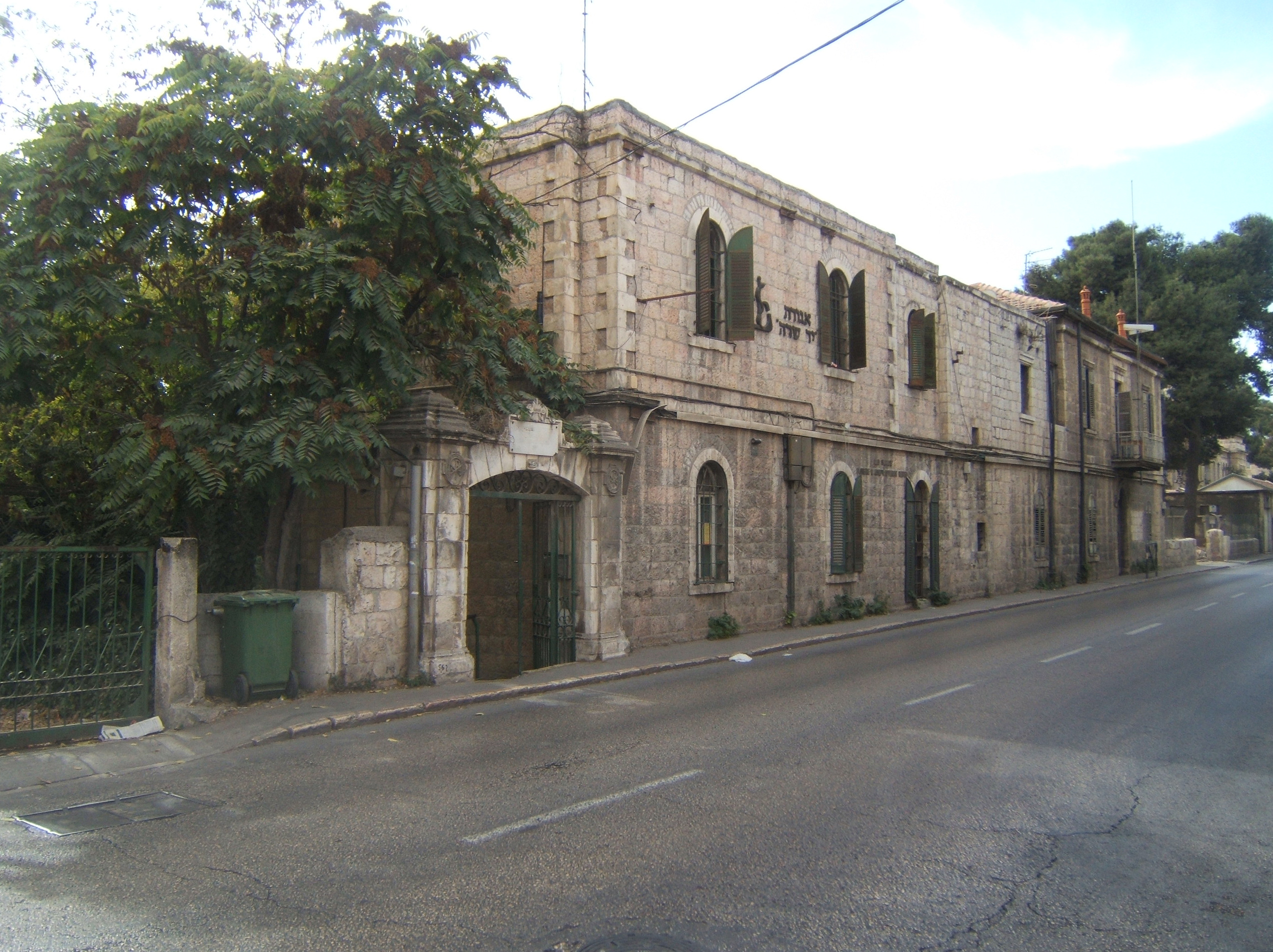
First office of Yad Sarah, Rehov Hanevi'im, Jerusalem

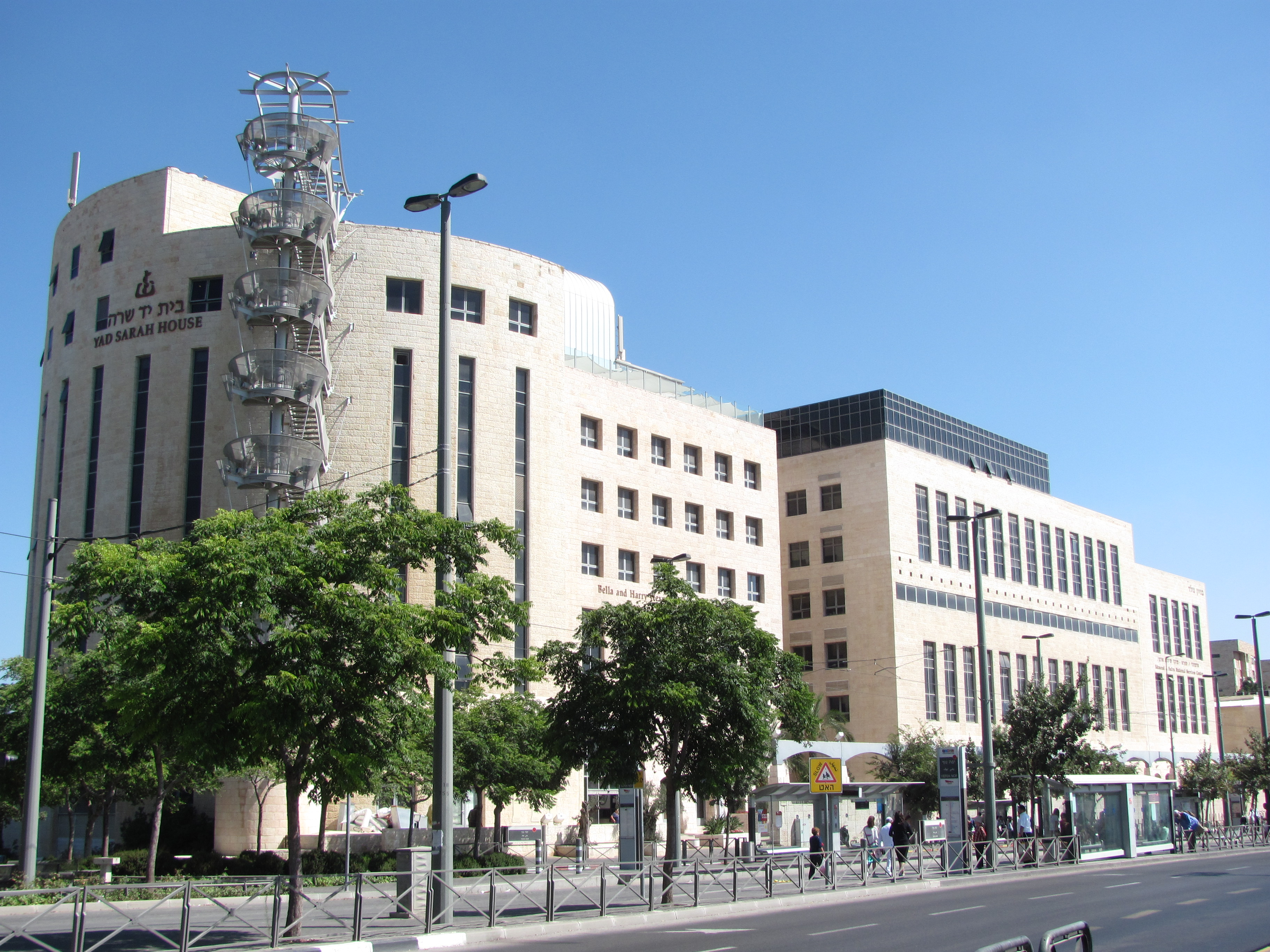
Yad Sarah headquarters in Beit Hakerem, Jerusalem

Yad Sarah started in the 1970s as a gemach (free-loan service) in the home of Rabbi Uri Lupolianski, who later served as mayor of Jerusalem from 2003 to 2008. At that time, Lupolianski was a high school teacher with a young family and one of his children needed a vaporizer during the winter, so his wife borrowed one from a neighbor. Upon hearing that such short-term-use items were hard to obtain, Lupolianski decided to start his own gemach by buying a few vaporizers to lend to others. People who heard about his gemach began dropping off other items which are also used for a short time, such as crutches, walkers and wheelchairs. With seed money from his father, Yaakov Lupolianski, and guidance from Kalman Mann, director general of Hadassah Medical Center, Lupolianski incorporated his gemach into a nationwide non-profit in 1976. Lupolianski named the organization Yad Sarah (Hebrew for "Memorial to Sarah") in memory of his grandmother, Sarah, who was murdered in the Holocaust. Yad Sarah raises 92% of its operating budget from donations. The organization does not receive any government assistance. Yad Sarah has helped establish equipment-lending centers and repair workshops in Angola, Cameroon, El Salvador, Russia, South Africa, and Jordan.

== Operation ==
As of 2022, Yad Sarah operates 126 equipment-lending branches throughout Israel. These are located in cities, development towns, and Arab villages, hospitals and private homes. Altogether, the branches stock approximately 300,000 items and 300 types of medical and rehabilitative equipment, including wheelchairs, crutches, beds and oxygen tanks. Yad Sarah's six-story Jerusalem headquarters and central warehouse on Herzl Blvd. occupies a full city block.

== Services ==
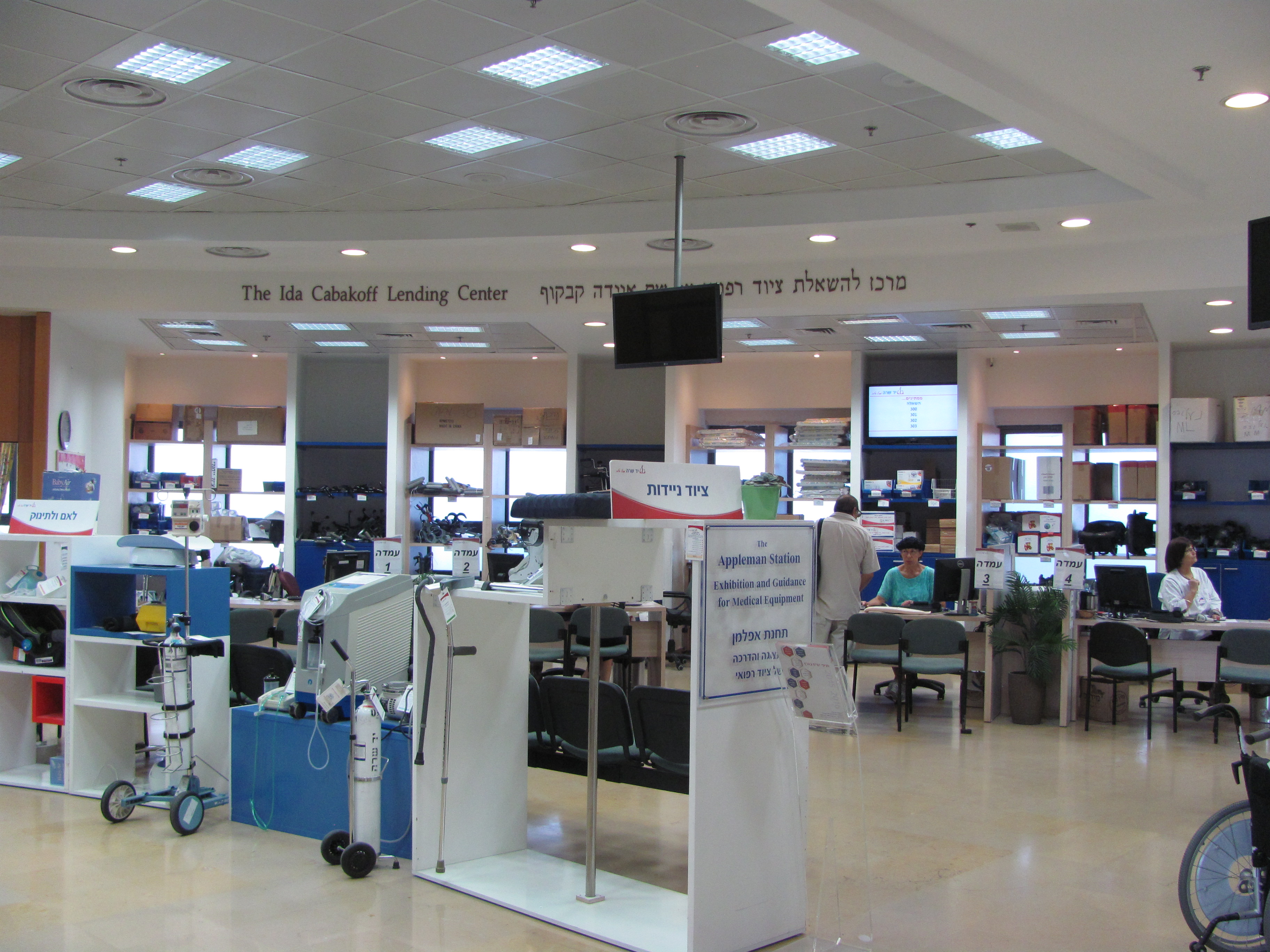
Medical equipment lending center at Yad Sarah House, Jerusalem

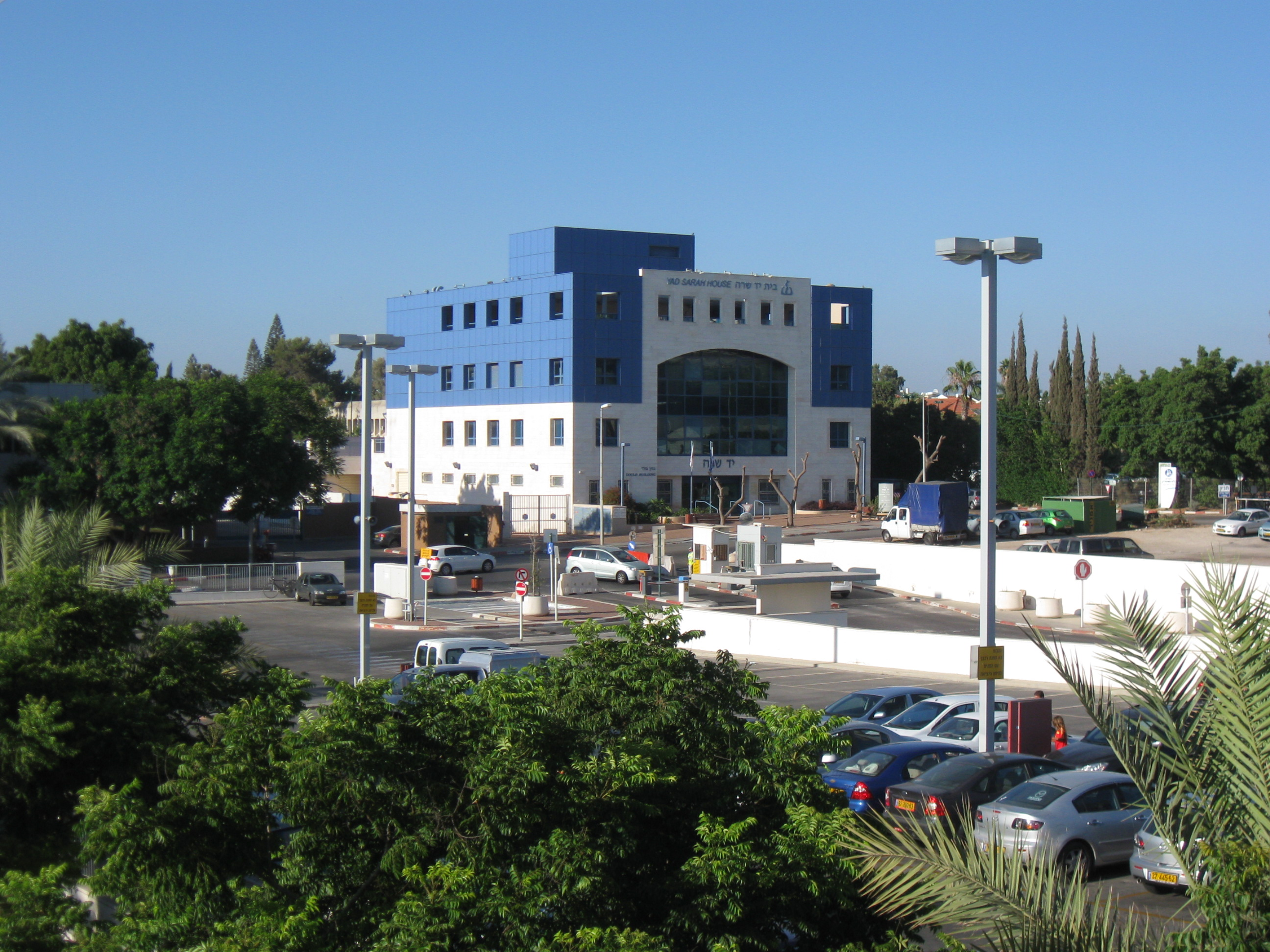
Ra'anana branch of Yad Sarah

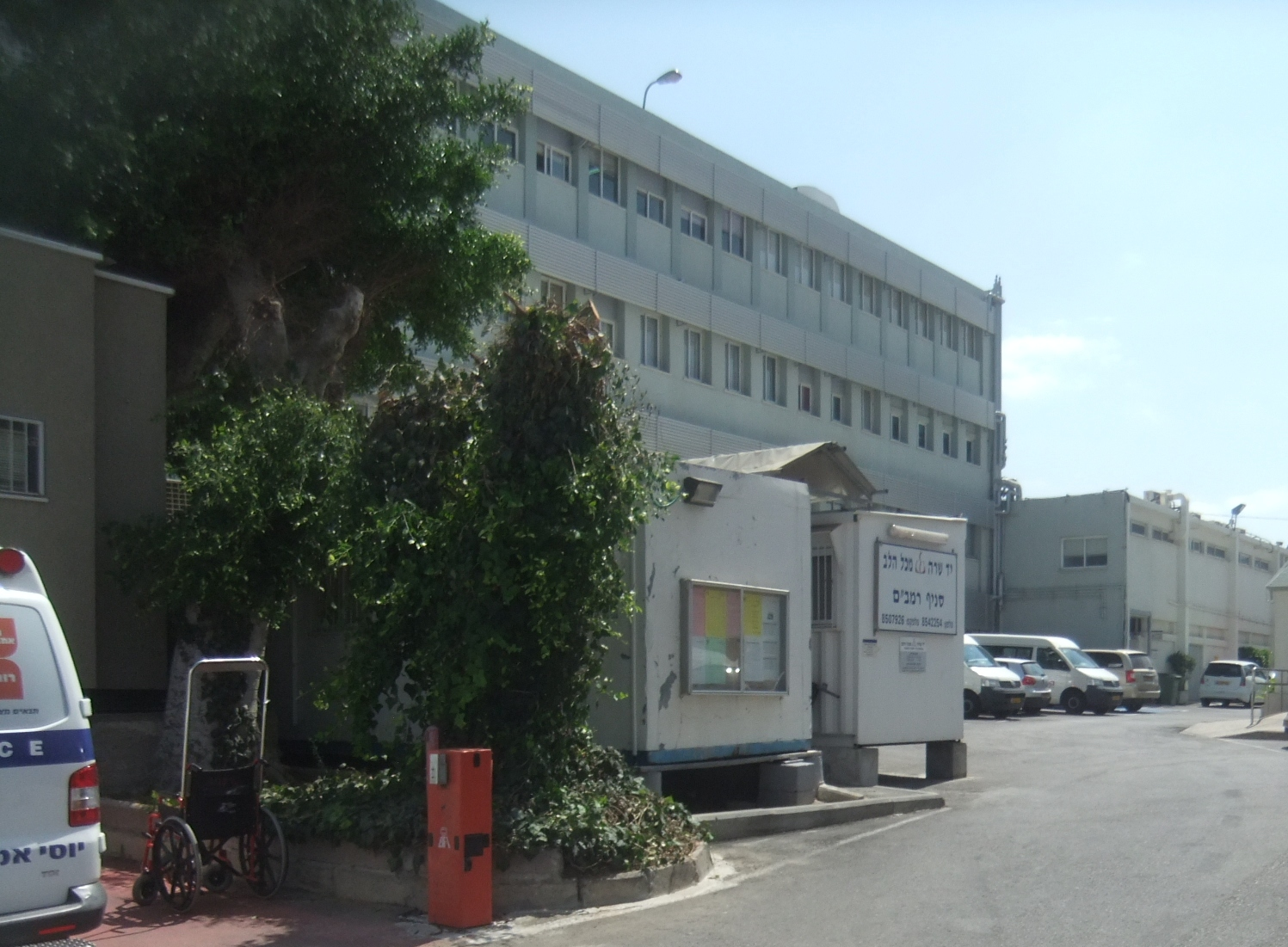
Yad Sarah branch at Rambam Hospital in Haifa

=== Equipment lending ===
Yad Sarah lends out wheelchairs, crutches, oxygen concentrators, apnea monitors, infant scales, hospital beds, shower chairs and commodes, high-tech and assistive devices, and many other home-care items. At any given time, 18,000 wheelchairs are in circulation. Equipment loans are free of charge; borrowers leave a refundable security deposit and can use the equipment for up to three months.

Worn or damaged items are repaired and refurbished at four regional warehouses staffed by volunteers. Yad Sarah receives donations of new and used equipment from local and foreign donors, and some communities have organized used equipment drives on the organization's behalf. In recent years, Yad Sarah began importing components and assembling its own orthopedic and high-tech equipment. It offers a six-month training course in parts assembly to unemployed new immigrants over the age of 50 from the Former Soviet Union and Ethiopia, with certification recognized by the Ministry of Labor.

In conjunction with its equipment-lending operation, Yad Sarah has established five resource and exhibition centers where clients can see and try out home-care equipment, and receive guidance on their use.

=== Oxygen service ===
Yad Sarah lends oxygen purifying machines and oxygen cylinders for home use. The organization is reimbursed for this service by Israel's National Insurance Institute (Bituah Leumi) and the patient's health insurer.

=== Wheelchair transportation ===
Specially equipped vans are available to transport persons in wheelchairs to doctor's appointments, Yad Sarah center activities, social occasions, or errands. These vans also bring disabled individuals to and from polling places on election day. Yad Sarah provides airport pick-up and return for disabled tourists as well.

=== National emergency alarm system ===
Yad Sarah introduced the first emergency alarm response service in Israel. Thousands of Israelis have been supplied with alarm transmitters which they can mount on their wall or wear on their wrist, connecting them with Yad Sarah's 24-hour emergency response center. Following payment of a token fee, the transmitters are lent for an unlimited period of time and are installed, repaired and serviced by volunteers free of charge. Yad Sarah has installed its alarm transmitters in kindergartens and nursery schools free of charge, to provide contact in the event of a terrorist attack.

=== Services for the homebound ===
- Meals on wheels: Yad Sarah provides cooked, frozen meals through a catering company and delivers them to the home for a nominal fee.
- Laundry service: Volunteers pick up soiled linens and bedclothes from the homes of incontinent individuals, wash and iron them, and return them. This service is available in Israel's three major cities for a nominal fee.
- Home repairs: Volunteers with mobile workshops perform home repairs for the elderly and housebound, collecting a token fee for parts.
- Home visits: Yad Sarah volunteers visit elderly and homebound individuals on a weekly basis to engage them in handicrafts, computer instruction, taping and typing of life stories, and wheelchair outings.

=== Legal aid for the elderly ===
Lawyers, social workers, and legal and social-work students volunteer their expertise to draft wills, mediate property and landlord issues, mediate family disputes, advise on insurance rights and pensions, and advocate in cases of elder abuse, all at low cost. This service, overseen by Yad Riva within the auspices of Yad Sarah, also makes house calls.

=== Geriatric dentistry ===
Yad Sarah's dental clinic is one of the few in the world specializing in geriatric dentistry. Volunteer dental surgeons, certified hygienists, and dental students provide treatment at the Jerusalem headquarters as well as in a mobile clinic that visits the elderly at home or in old age homes. On average, patients pay 70% of the cost price of dental treatment, and Yad Sarah subsidizes the remainder.

=== Day rehabilitation centers ===
Yad Sarah operates Day Rehabilitation Centers in Jerusalem, Rishon LeZion, Beer Sheba, Ra'anana and Netanya. These centers, designed to help adults recover and restore independent functioning, offer activities such as art therapy, music, horticulture, and holiday parties. Participants arrive in wheelchairs, with crutches or walkers, or in Yad Sarah vans. Yad Sarah also operates a fitness center and a computer center for individuals with disabilities.

=== Children's services ===
The Yad Sarah Play Center in Jerusalem supplements the therapeutic process for children with mild to moderate developmental delays. Professionally trained volunteers guide children aged 3 to 12 in five play rooms, including a "noisy" activity room for children with coordination difficulties, a "quiet" activity room for youth with attention deficit disorders, a game room, an imagination room with costumes and props, a creativity room with arts-and-crafts supplies, and a computer room with interactive games and puzzles. Parents attend orientation workshops and accompany their child each week so they can learn new ways to play with the child at home. A morning program provides information and skills to parents of infants and toddlers with mild to severe developmental disabilities.

Yad Sarah dispatches a mobile lending library throughout the country which lends special toys, games and books to disabled children.

=== Retirement club ===
The Golden Age Club is an education and recreation program for retirees. Volunteers lead classes in language studies, arts and crafts, folk dancing, and Tai Chai, as well as offer podiatry, manicure, pedicure and reflexology. Participants can purchase discount tickets to theaters, concerts, and exhibitions. The club maintains a cafeteria which sells light meals, snacks and coffee, plus pre-cooked, frozen meals, at nominal cost.

== Volunteers ==
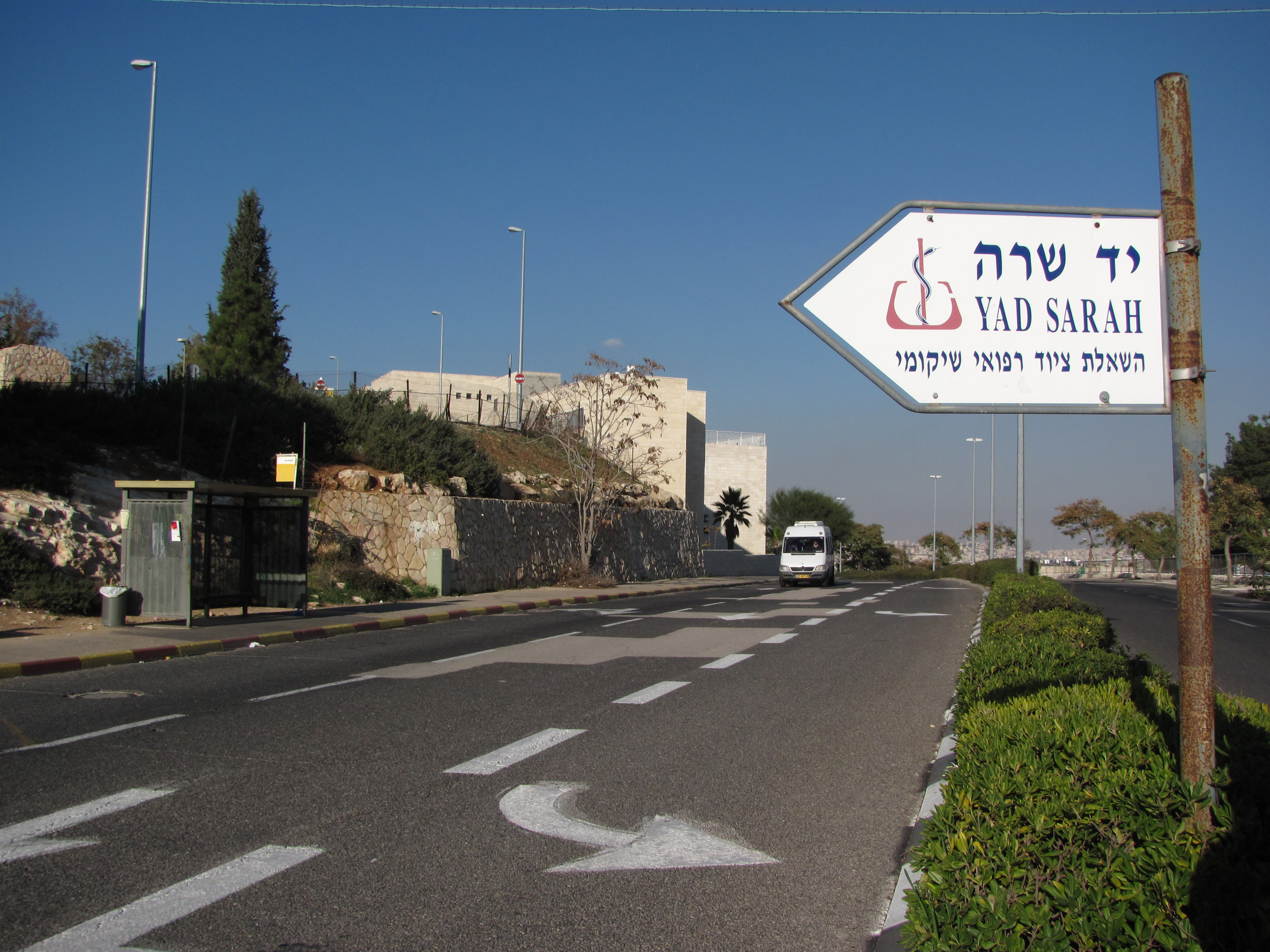
Signpost for Yad Sarah branch in Ramot Polin, Jerusalem

Volunteers are of all ages and backgrounds, including different socioeconomic sectors and cultural and religious backgrounds. They include retirees and moderately disabled persons. While women usually dominate the volunteer field, fully 35% of the volunteer staff is male. Lupolianski, the founder and president of Yad Sarah, is also a volunteer. He still runs one of the equipment-lending branches in his home.

In addition to Yad Sarah's regular volunteers, students, bar and bat mitzvah groups, and other visitors to Israel often lend a hand at the wheelchair-repair center in Jerusalem.

== Awards and recognition ==
Yad Sarah received the Kaplan Prize for Efficiency in 1990 and the 1994 Israel Prize for its special contribution to society and the State of Israel. In 1982 Lupolianski was the recipient of the President's Award for Volunteering.

In 2004 the United Nations recognized Yad Sarah as a Non-Governmental Organization, according it UN observer status. In 2005 the UN Committee on Non-Governmental Organizations upgraded Yad Sarah's status to an advisory body to the United Nations Economic and Social Council. This status allows Yad Sarah to participate in General Assembly meetings and UN international conferences, as well as serve as consultants for UN and government bodies.

== See also ==
- List of Israel Prize recipients
- List of investors in Bernard L. Madoff Securities
