= Gann Academy =

Private high school in Greater Boston

- The Gann Academy seal

Location
- 333 Forest Street; Waltham, Middlesex, MA 02452; United States; 42.39513°N 71.21703°W

Information
- Former name: The New Jewish High School
- School type: Private coeducational secondary
- Religious affiliation: Judaism
- Denomination: Pluralistic
- Established: 1997
- Status: Open
- Chairperson: William Foster
- Head of school: Dalia Hochman
- Grades: 9–12
- Enrollment: 342
- Average class size: 12
- Student to teacher ratio: 4:1
- Classrooms: 30
- Colors: Maroon and white
- Slogan: Who Will You Become?
- Mascot: Red Heifer
- Nickname: Gann
- Team name: Gann Heifers
- Accreditation: New England Association of Schools and Colleges and Association of Independent Schools of New England
- Newspaper: Shevuon Hatichon
- Tuition: $10,000 to $56,950
- Website: www.gannacademy.org
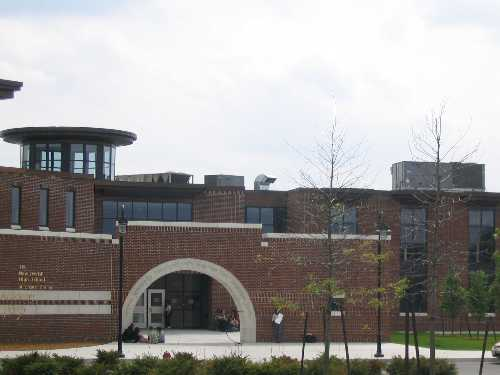
- Gann Academy

Gann Academy (Hebrew: תיכון חדש) is a coeducational Jewish high school located in Waltham, Massachusetts, United States. It was founded in 1997 and is a member of the National Association of Independent Schools and is accredited by the New England Association of Schools and Colleges.

== History ==
Gann Academy was founded in 1997 as The New Jewish High School of Greater Boston by former head of school Daniel Lehmann. It was originally adjacent to Brandeis University. Lehman intended for the school to be a place to foster a sense of community among students from different forms and expressions of Judaism.

Casually nicknamed "New Jew," it opened with 48 students in the 9th and 10th grades. In the Fall of 1998, the school moved to the top four floors and basement of the Fleet Bank building (BankBoston at the time) at the intersection of Prospect Street and Main Street in Waltham, seeking larger facilities and a more permanent home. It used the basement of the local Temple Beth Israel for additional classroom space. The school changed its name in 2003 in honor of philanthropist Joseph Gann, who had donated $5,000,000. In 2004, Gann moved into a newly built 110,000 sq. ft. campus building in Waltham. The land the campus was built on was formerly occupied by the Murphy Army Hospital.

The 2005 documentary Hineini focused on the school, and one student's efforts to create a gay–straight alliance there.

== Judaism ==
Gann Academy is a pluralistic day school with students and faculty coming from a number of different denominations of Judaism. There are students of Orthodox, Conservative, Reform, Reconstructionist, Secular, and non-denominational backgrounds.

Students have mandatory Tefillah two days a week but have a variety of different options as to what type to attend. The school as a whole keeps vegetarian dairy kosher, and students may not bring meat into the building.

== Academics ==
The school has a student-teacher ratio of 5:1. In addition to general studies such as STEM, language and arts classes, the school's curriculum includes classes which focus on Judaism, Jewish history and the Hebrew language. The school's history program places a heavy emphasis on debate and civics. In 2007, Jonathan Golden, chair of the history department, described the school's approach as "a John Dewey-inspired experiment in democratic education." The school has an acapella group called the ShenaniGanns.

== Athletics ==
Gann Academy offers the following in terms of sport:

- Basketball
- Baseball
- Volleyball
- Lacrosse
- Soccer
- Fitness
- Yoga
- Farming
- Tennis
- Frisbee
- Hiking
- Table Tennis
- Running

== Campus ==
The school's Waltham campus was designed by architect Steve Friedlander.
