= Hineini =

Hineini: Coming Out in a Jewish High School
- Directed by: Irena Fayngold
- Produced by: Keshet and Irena Fayngold
- Cinematography: Bob Nesson
- Edited by: Michael Traub
- Distributed by: Keshet
- Release date: 2005
- Running time: 60 minutes
- Country: United States
- Language: English

Hineini: Coming Out in a Jewish High School (2005) is a documentary film by director Irena Fayngold.

== Plot ==
Hineini (Hebrew for 'Here I am') chronicles the story of Izen's attempt to establish a gay-straight alliance at a Jewish high school in Boston.

The student, Shulamit Izen, enters 9th grade at The New Jewish High School (now Gann Academy) in Waltham, Massachusetts openly identifying as a lesbian. Set in an interview format, Hineini documents Izen, her family, teachers, and other students who both support her campaign and those who oppose it.

Among the themes examined in the documentary is the Jewish community wrestling with the issues of pluralism and diversity.

== Impact ==
The film was listed in the 2006 issue of Slingshot, a resource guide of the "50 most innovative Jewish organizations and projects" in the United States.

Hineini, along with Trembling Before G-d and Encounter Point, is featured in the Films That Change the World Purim to Passover Project.

== Reactions ==
"An engaging portrait of a pioneering teen activist...a terrific teaching tool. New Jew's take on religious pluralism is never less than fascinating as students and staffers hold forth, pros and cons. Docu renders ancient concerns as vibrantly contemporary." - Variety

"[Hineini] examines how one community balanced its members’ profound and conflicting needs...Fayngold captures [the] tension...[and] the emotional stakes." -The Boston Globe

"...it's hard to resist the inspiring story of Shulamit Izen, a lesbian student who started a Gay-Straight Alliance at her private, religious New Jewish High School." - San Francisco Chronicle

"Director Irena Fayngold retraced Izen's journey, which took place in 2001, for her film...When she met Izen, Fayngold realized 'this wasn't the story of one girl. It was the story of a community,' she said."

"Poignant…Fayngold’s film reveals both the pathos and humor involved in the soul-searching that Izen and Gann Academy experience." -Jewish Telegraph Agency

"In the end it is perhaps [Headmaster Rabbi] Lehmann who articulates the film’s theme most precisely and most eloquently by noting that 'the core of our tradition is to bring together those conflicting opinions not in an attempt to somehow resolve them or create harmony, but to actually live in the tension of those differences.'"

== See also ==
- List of LGBT-related films
