= Hebrew Free Loan Society of New York =

Organization in New York City

- Formation: 1892
- Headquarters: New York City, United States
- Region served: New York City
- Key people: Ian Shrank (Board Chair); Rabbi David Rosenn (President & CEO)
- Website: hfls.org

The Hebrew Free Loan Society (HFLS) of New York, also known as the Hebrew Gemilath Chassodim Association, founded in 1892, is the oldest money gemach in the United States. It spawned similarly named free-loan funds in many other cities, including Washington, D.C.; Philadelphia, Pennsylvania; and Holyoke, Massachusetts.

The Hebrew Free Loan Society is an organization that has been serving the community since 1892. Rooted in Jewish tradition, it provides interest-free loans to residents of New York City's five boroughs, Westchester, and Long Island, regardless of their ethnic heritage or religion. HFLS offers a variety of loan programs tailored to different needs, such as small business support, education, health care, housing, and even adoption or fertility treatments. It is considered to be a "benevolent loan provider," and not a bank or credit union.

Cited as an example of how American Jews had "developed some of the most impressive philanthropic networks in the world", the free loan society has made more than $380 million in loans since its founding, with a 99.9% repayment rate. (Note: "Traditionally, the Gemach has been a financial institution, whereby members of the community could take an interest-free loan to pay off medical bills, purchase a funeral plot, or arrange a wedding. The first Gemach of this kind in the United States was the Hebrew Free Loan Society of New York, established in 1892 by ten friends pooling together $95. Since its founding, it claims to have loaned over $380 million to 900,000 borrowers, with a 99.9% repayment rate.")

== History ==
The organization was founded on Henry Street on the Lower East Side in 1892 by a group of 11 men who contributed $95 towards making free loans. The organization's mission to make "free loans" was based on adherence to Jewish law prohibiting charging interest on loans, based on such biblical admonitions as the verse in Exodus (22:25) stating "If thou loan money to My people, to the poor by thee, thou shalt not lay upon him interest." (Note: "On a December evening in 1892, 11 men met at the Wilner Synagogue on Henry Street in Manhattan and pooled their savings - $95 - to establish a free loan society similar to those they had known in their native eastern European countries.... Today the society is still making interest-free loans to immigrants, giving out $2 million each year since 1976. Although the society still lends the majority of its money to Jews, it has been a nonsectarian organization since its founding.... On the 75th anniversary of the society in 1967, it reported that it had made loans totaling more than $52 million to more than 776,500 people. Since then the society has lent more than an additional $30 million.") As to motive for these efforts, "Edward A. Filene, a Boston Jewish department store owner and philanthropist, encouraged low-interest loans because, in his own words, he wanted to 'fight the age old prejudice that all Jews were usurers.'"

The goal of the organization was established early:

... to loan money to poor people without charging any interest or any expense whatsoever.” The HFLS Constitutions and By-Laws stated no barrier to race or creed in issuing loans, but only to “organize a society whose object shall be to loan to those in need certain sums of money instead of giving alms, and thus assist respectable people, whose character and self-respect abhor the thought of receiving alms, to overcome the difficulties in their struggle for the means of existence ....

Shortly after the organization was founded, financier Jacob Schiff became a regular donor to the organization. (Note: "On a December evening in 1892, 11 men met at the Wilner Synagogue on Henry Street in Manhattan and pooled their savings - $95 - to establish a free loan society similar to those they had known in their native eastern European countries.... Today the society is still making interest-free loans to immigrants, giving out $2 million each year since 1976. Although the society still lends the majority of its money to Jews, it has been a nonsectarian organization since its founding.... On the 75th anniversary of the society in 1967, it reported that it had made loans totaling more than $52 million to more than 776,500 people. Since then the society has lent more than an additional $30 million.") Other early benefactors included philanthropists Baron Maurice de Hirsch and Baroness Clara de Hirsch, as well as Adolph Lewisohn. (Note: "Since that time the Society has loaned many millions of dollars without impairment of its original capital which has been increased by donations and bequests on the part of such men as the late Jacob H. Schiff, The Baron and Baroness DeHirsch, Adolph Lewisohn and many other leading figures in Jewish philanthropy.")

Using money provided by contributions, the society provides small, interest-free loans which are paid back in regular installments. The group made $1,200 in small-denomination loans in its first year, repaid in ten equal monthly payments and guaranteed by someone with good credit, which had expanded to more than $360,000 loaned to 15,000 borrowers by 1905. Their mission was to make a discernible difference in the community. (Note: The Society "fosters economic self-sufficiency and economic security among New Yorkers in need through interest-free lending. We do this work in partnership with others to ensure that our programs respond to identified needs, that we are nimble in adapting to the dynamic changes in our community, and that we make a discernable [sic] difference in the lives of those we serve. Hfls loans make an immediate, concrete difference in the lives of our borrowers, enabling them to invest in their education, start a business, meet emergency expenses, and more.")

At their peak, there were more than 500 such societies operating in the United States. Additionally, there were hundreds more that were ancillary with synagogues and fraternal organizations. They provided capital to immigrants who were unable to attain loans from traditional sources, such as banks. In 1920 alone, the Hebrew Free Loan Society of New York distributed more than a million dollars to Jewish-owned small businesses.

The Great Depression resulted in a spike in borrowing in 1929 to more than $1.1 million in loans, almost triple the $400,000 loaned five years earlier, much of it made to small business owners who could no longer borrow from traditional banks. For the year 1929, the organization reported that borrowers had defaulted on less than one-tenth of a percent of all loans that had been made the previous year. (Note: "Business depression during the latter part of 1929 caused a sharp increase in the demands upon the Hebrew Free Loan Society, according to the annual report of its president, Julius J. Dukas, delivered at the annual meeting yesterday afternoon.")

Real estate investor Joseph Durst, founder of The Durst Organization, served from 1945 to 1972 as president of the society. (Note: "Mr. Durst was also president from 1945 to 1972 of the Hebrew Free Loan Society, which makes loans without charge to needy individuals of any faith and to Jewish community organizations, largely in the field of religious education.")

In the early 1970s, the Free Loan Society made a series of larger loans to Chabad Hasidim who were making down payments on homes as part of an effort to help maintain the core of the Jewish community around the organization's headquarters at 770 Eastern Parkway in Crown Heights, Brooklyn, that had seen many white residents leave the neighborhood. (Note: "In an effort to anchor their traditional community in the Crown Heights section of Brooklyn, Lubavitch Hasidic Jews are buying houses in their neighborhood with the aid of interest‐free loans. The loans — ranging from $2,500 to $3,500 — have been provided by the Hebrew Free Loan Society, an organization that started in 1892 to give immigrants financial aid.")

By the 1980s, the Free Loan Society was making $2 million a year in free loans, by which time the organization had made more than $80 million in loans. While most of the loans are made to Jews, the organization is non-sectarian and has donated to people of varied backgrounds and religions. In 1982, the organization reported that all but $100 of the $2 million in loans had been repaid, with most defaults historically being related to the death of borrowers.

From 1892 and as of 2023, the Hebrew Free Loan Society has provided more than 900,000 borrowers with more than $400 million in interest-free loans.

The Hebrew Free Loan Society entered into a partnership with the Colin Powell School for Civic and Global Leadership at The City College of New York "to provide interest-free emergency loans of up to $2,000 to currently-enrolled low and moderate-income students."

Their archival records repose at the American Jewish Historical Society.

== Loan criteria ==
The Hebrew Free Loan Society (HFLS) determines loan eligibility based on four key criteria:

1. Residency: Applicants must live in New York City's five boroughs, Westchester, or Long Island, New York.
2. Income: Household income must fall within low to moderate levels, as defined by the Department of Housing and Urban Development's guidelines. Specific income limits vary based on household size.
3. Guarantors: Depending on the loan program, applicants need one or two qualified guarantors. These guarantors must have good credit, meet their current debt obligations, and demonstrate the ability to repay the loan if necessary.
4. Purpose: Loans are provided for specific needs, such as education, healthcare, small business support, or emergencies. Each loan program has its own requirements. Business loans are available. (Note: ”The Hebrew Free Loan Society advances economic stability and opportunity for lower income New Yorkers within and beyond the Jewish community by making safe, affordable interest-free loans. The Small Business Loan Program provides interest-free loans of up to $50,000 to low- and moderate-income residents of New York City's five boroughs, Westchester, or Long Island to help launch or expand a business.”)

HFLS is non-sectarian, which means that applicants do not need to be Jewish to qualify. (Note: Some Free Loan Societies are sectarian. For example, Cf. Jewish Federation of Central New York.)

== See also ==
- Aktsiye, which is a Jewish form of credit union
- Halakha
- International Association of Hebrew Free Loans
- Loans and interest in Judaism
