= PROTECT Kids Act =

American bill introduced in 2023

- Long title: A Bill To require elementary and middle schools that receive Federal funds to obtain parental consent before changing a minor child’s gender markers, pronouns, or preferred name on any school form, allowing a child to change the child’s sex-based accommodations, including locker rooms or bathrooms.

Legislative history
- Introduced in the House of Representatives as H.R. 5 by Tim Walberg (R‑MI-05; on February 1, 2023 (118th Congress); Committee consideration by United States House Committee on Education and the Workforce

The Parental Rights Over the Education and Care of Their Kids Act (shortened to the PROTECT Kids Act) was United States legislation introduced in both the House of Representatives and Senate of the 118th Congress. Sponsored by Republican representative Tim Walberg and senators Rick Scott of Florida and Tim Scott of South Carolina and originating in the 117th Congress, the bill was similar to and viewed of as a national version of the Florida Parental Rights in Education Act.

Walberg's legislation was passed by the House Committee on Education and the Workforce, and the bill's text was merged into the Parental Bill of Rights Act on March 5, 2023.

== Background ==
The legislation had its roots in Florida governor Ron DeSantis's push to reform education across the state. The first major bill to pass was the Parental Rights in Education Act, which was signed into law in March 2022 and became effective the following July. Among other provisions, the legislation most controversially prohibits the instruction of gender identity and sexual orientation from kindergarten to third grade in Florida public schools.

The act received massive protests from numerous organizations in government, human rights advocacy, education, and business, most notably provoking walkouts among middle and high school students across the United States and inciting a feud between DeSantis and The Walt Disney Company which resulted in the repeal of the Reedy Creek Improvement Act and the special taxation district housing Walt Disney World. With the passage of the law, numerous other state legislatures introduced their own versions of the act, with many bills in states where their legislatures are dominated by Republicans passing and receiving a signature from their governors. Some Republican lawmakers have introduced national derivative legislation previously, including the Stop the Sexualization of Children Act, which failed to pass either house of Congress prior to the conclusion of the 117th Congress.

== Provisions ==
The legislation's primary method of enforcing its provisions was by restricting federal funding to elementary and middle schools. Under the bill, practices that schools engage could in that could restrict their access to federal funding include enabling students to change their preferred gender pronouns and gender markers, and "sex-based accommodations". These were meant to include bathrooms and locker rooms.

== Legislative history ==
Tim Scott initially announced the legislation on his website via a blog post released on September 20, 2022. Though the bill was unable to be passed in the 117th Congress before its conclusion, the legislation was reintroduced, this time with Rick Scott as a cosponsor, in the 118th Congress on February 1, 2023.

In the House of Representatives, Walberg's legislation was advanced in the House Committee on Education and the Workforce on March 9, 2023, and merged into H.R 5, the Parental Bill of Rights Act.

== Support ==
The bills sponsors argued that schools should not be used to teach about sexual orientation. In his initial announcement for the legislation, Tim Scott outlined his belief that schools are "indoctrinating" children into "woke ideology" at a young age. Scott stated his belief that parents should know about their children's sexual orientation rather than having it kept secret from them, blaming the status quo on "radical and secretive gender policies [which] have shut parents out of the conversation and broken their trust". Scott phrased his bill as something which will "safeguard parental rights" and prevent an "activist ideology" from being too prominent in schools.
