= Gemach =

Jewish lending method

Gemach (Hebrew: גמ"ח, plural, גמחים, gemachim, an abbreviation for גמילות חסדים, gemilut chasadim, "acts of kindness") is a Jewish free-loan fund that subscribes to both the positive Torah commandment of lending money and the Torah prohibition against charging interest on a personal loan to a fellow Jew. Unlike bank loans, gemach loans are interest-free, and are often set up with easy repayment terms.

Gemachs operate in most Jewish communities. The traditional gemach concept—that of a money-lending fund—extends loans on a short- or long-term basis for any need, including emergency loans, medical expenses, wedding expenses, etc. However, many people have expanded the concept of gemachs to include free loans of household items, clothing, books, equipment, services and advice. Even small business loans may be obtained.

Gemachs may be operated both on a communal basis (such as by treasurers of community funds) and an internal basis (such as by businesses, organizations, schools and families). The ideal of contributing to or forming one's own gemach was popularized by Rabbi Yisrael Meir Kagan (the Chofetz Chaim), who addressed many halachic questions about the practice and lauded its spiritual benefits in his landmark book, Ahavat Chesed ("Loving Kindness").

== Biblical source ==
Money gemachs fulfill the Biblical imperative, "You shall lend money to my people" (Exodus 22:25) as well as the Biblical injunction, "You shall not give him your money for interest, nor may you give him your food for increase" (Leviticus 25:37).

Gemachs that provide other services, such as clothing, books and equipment, fall under the general Biblical commandment to do kindness, "Love your neighbor as yourself" (Leviticus 19:18).

== Modern history ==
Gemachs, known as Jewish or Hebrew Free Loan Societies in English-speaking countries, were among the first institutions established by Jewish immigrants to the United States from Eastern Europe. Most gemachim were founded between 1880 and 1914 in communities where Jews settled, although some were established as late as 1940. The Hebrew Free Loan Society of New York, the oldest gemach in America, was established in 1892 when 11 men pooled their savings to establish it. They initially raised $95, which they loaned out in increments of $5 and $10. The society is still in existence today.

By the turn of the 20th century there were approximately 500 gemachs in the United States. One reason for their prevalence was that banks did not want to make loans to low-income Jewish borrowers. But with repayment rates exceeding 99 percent, banks eventually realized that Jewish borrowers were desirable customers, and began loaning to them in the 1940s.

The 2008 financial crisis sparked a resurgence of gemachim in some cities. Milwaukee, which had a gemach at the turn of the century, is in the process of creating a new free-loan society.

== Types of loan ==
Gemachs are best known for lending money on a short- or long-term basis.

The size of the loan will depend on the lender's resources. A home-based gemach might offer loans of $100 and up, while a wedding gemach may extend a loan of several thousand dollars. Typically, gemachs also offer favorable repayment terms, enabling borrowers to repay the loan over a long period of time, in keeping with the imperative of "doing kindness." One Jerusalem family offers loans of $750 with repayment of $150 per month. A wedding gemach offers a $3000 loan with repayment of $100 per month. The Israel Free Loan Association (IFLA) is the largest interest free loan association in the world, with loans from NIS 20,000 for individuals up to NIS 90,000 for small businesses (www.freeloan.org.il) and serves Israeli citizens anywhere in Israel.

While poor families and individuals in debt are frequent users of gemachs, borrowers need not be poor. Money gemachs also cater to students, workers, or any individual in need of a loan. Internal money gemachs are common fixtures in yeshivas, synagogues, and workplaces, among others.

The gemach concept has expanded to include free loans of household items, clothing, books, equipment, services and advice. Following is a sampling of gemach services found in the Jerusalem telephone directory of 2002:

Low chairs and other necessities for mourning; food for simchas; food for the needy; food for hospital visitors; moving boxes; used clothes; English and American stamps; Dead Sea mud; sewing patterns; hosting guests; hosting guests near hospitals; transporting invalids; wedding needs; wedding dresses; health food and vitamins; tallits; telephone cards; cell phones; form letters; burners; tools; banquet dishes; tables and chairs; playpens; fans; loudspeakers; baby paraphernalia; suitcases; mezuzahs; mattresses; partitions; computers; water urns; folding beds; microwaves; haircutting equipment; inhalers; sewing machines; tablecloths; cameras; blankets; projectors; fridges and freezers; toys; glasses; candles; segulot; ladders; pots; sifrei Torah; books; cribs; film; Shabbat hot plates; Shabbat candlesticks; furniture; vacuum cleaners; work tools and more.

The Neve Yaakov telephone directory currently includes gemach listings for a plumber and a guitarist who offer free advice by telephone. Southfield, MI (Detroit) has a gemach for baby items such as strollers, high chairs, and packnplays. Chicago was the first city to create a gemach of educational materials and resources for teachers in Jewish education.

== Repayment ==
To ensure repayment of a money loan, gemachs will typically ask the borrower to provide two guarantors as co-signers on the loan. (In halakha this is known as areivut.) Should the borrower fail to repay on time, the gemach owner can turn to these co-signers and demand repayment, a claim that will be upheld in a beit din (Jewish rabbinical court).

Laws also pertain to the person who borrows clothing, equipment, or other items from a gemach. Goods that are damaged must be replaced or reimbursed. Although a Jew should lend to those in need, he is not obligated to continue to lend to someone who consistently loses things or returns them damaged.

== See also ==
- 613 mitzvot
- Hebrew Free Loan Society of New York
- Hebrew Free Loan Society of Greater Philadelphia
- International Association of Hebrew Free Loans
- Yad Sarah
- Sukuk
