= Nativ College Leadership Program =

Israel's gap year program

Nativ College Leadership Program is the gap year program in Israel, run by United Synagogue Youth. It includes an academic component in fall semester, travel, and a community service component in spring semester. It is associated with Conservative Judaism.

The program had a record enrollment of 106 participants in 2007, which was prior to the recent recession in the United States. This came at a time of increased enrollment for several gap year programs in Israel, which was attributed by Keith Berman of Young Judaea's Year Course to calm in Israel. Others cited growth in financial aid, and growing acceptance of gap years in general in North America.

Nativ numbers fell 30% with the North American recession in 2008–2009 along with other gap year programs, but recovered in 2009–2010 from 80 to 95 students. David Keren of United Synagogue Youth said that people were getting used to the 2008 financial crisis and that Nativ conducted aggressive marketing.

== Tracks ==
Each student who goes on Nativ gets to choose from different options for their academic semester (fall) and community service semester (spring). All participants are based in Jerusalem, near the city center, during the first semester, their options include: attending the Rothberg International School at Hebrew University of Jerusalem on Mount Scopus, learning at the Conservative Yeshiva, or taking Ulpan classes in the broader Jerusalem community. For the spring semester Naitv-ers have traditionally been able to choose from either a kibbutz or city track. For many years Kibbutz Saad, and then Kibbutz Ein Tzurim, hosted Nativ participants for the spring semester. Recently, due to security issues with the kibbutz's location close to the border with Gaza, the kibbutz option has been moved to Kfar Hasidim a youth village in the north of Israel near Haifa. Another option for participants is to move into a developing community in either Yeruham or Karmiel and volunteer within the community there. Possible service options are teaching English in local high schools and yeshivot, joining the Magen David Adom ambulance corps, volunteering in kindergartens and preschools, as well as other opportunities that might change year to year.

== Notable alumni ==
- Michael Levin (soldier)
- Alexander Gould
