= Joshua Kulp =

Israeli Talmudic scholar (born 1970)

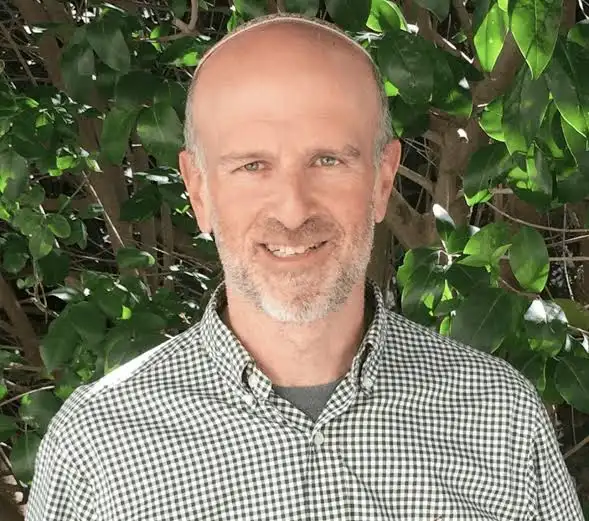
Image of Josh Kulp

Rabbi Joshua Kulp (Hebrew: יהושע קולפ; born July 16, 1970) is an American-Israeli Talmudic scholar.

== Early life and education ==
Kulp was born on July 16, 1970, in the United States and grew up in Margate, New Jersey. He earned his undergraduate degree at the University of Michigan and his PhD in Talmud at Bar-Ilan University. In 2023, Kulp received semikhah from Hadar as a member of Hadar's first cohort of rabbinical students.

== Career ==
Kulp is especially known for his commentary on the Haggadah.

Kulp was one of the founders of the Conservative Yeshiva, where he is (as of 2022) a faculty member and senior scholar. He also coordinates the online Mishnah Yomit and Daf Shevui projects through the Fuchsberg Jerusalem Center, the congregational organization for Conservative Judaism.

== Personal life ==
He has two daughters (Zoey and Rakia) and two sons (Yadin and Anan) and lives in Modi'in as of 2023.

== Books ==
- The Schechter Haggadah, 2009
- Reconstructing the Talmud, Mechon Hadar, 2014
