= Masorti =

Masorti may refer to:

- Masortim, a Jewish sociological group
- Conservative Judaism, Masorti Judaism in North America
- Masorti Olami, an international umbrella for Masorti Judaism in Jerusalem
- Masorti on Campus, a student organization for conservative and Masorti Jews in college and university
