= National symbols of Jordan =

National symbols of Jordan are the symbols that are used in Jordan and abroad to represent the country and its people.

== National flag ==
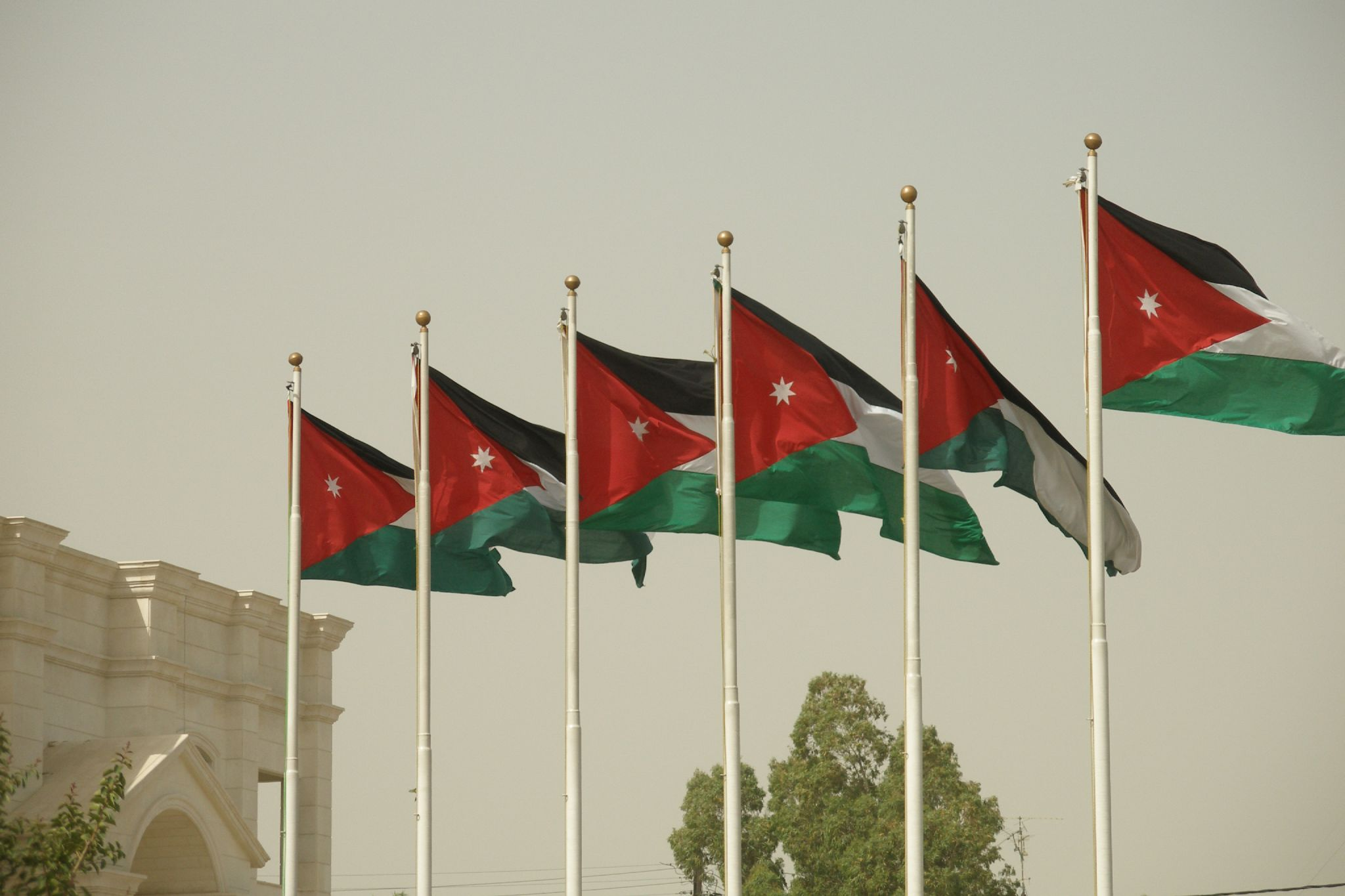
Flags of Jordan

The flag of Jordan is the official flag of the Hashemite Kingdom of Jordan, which represents the state, its sovereignty, its institutions and its citizens, both in Jordan and worldwide. This flag consists of horizontal black, white, and green bands that are connected by a red triangle at the hoist. The red triangle contains a seven-pointed star.

The flag of Jordan, officially adopted on 18 April 1928, is based on the flag of the Arab Revolt against the Ottoman Empire during World War I.

== National emblem ==
Emblem of Jordan

The emblem was designed at the request of King Abdullah I bin al-Hussein in 1921 was declared an official logo as an emblem of the Hashemite Kingdom of Jordan by the Council of Ministers on August 25, 1934, under Administrative Order No. 558. On February 21, 1982, Council of Ministers issued the official statement No. 6, which explained the specifications.

It was designed by Jordanian architect Fawwaz Muhanna.

== National anthem ==
"The Royal Anthem of Jordan" (Arabic: السلام الملكي الأردني, Al-salam Al-malaki Al-urdoni) is the national anthem of Jordan. It was and adopted as the kingdom's official anthem in 1946. It was written by Abdelmunim al-Rifai, a Palestinian-Lebanese poet and a former Prime Minister who traveled to Amman in 1939.

The anthem the Jordanian people's happiness for achieving independence, and their pride of the Hashemite family and its Arab lineage.

== National colors ==
Jordan uses the Pan-Arab colors as its national colors, which are all used on the Jordanian flag. The origin of these colors comes from the flags of the Abbasid (black), Umayyad (white) and Rashidun (green) caliphates, and the Arab Revolt (red).

Jordan's national colors are also the traditional team colors of the Jordan national sporting teams. And they are used on the logos of many of its institutes.

== National tree ==
Quercus ithaburensis Decne. or Quercus aegilops(Arabic: السنديان الطبراني أو الملول), a subspecies of the oak (البلوط) tree, is the national tree of Jordan.

== National bird ==
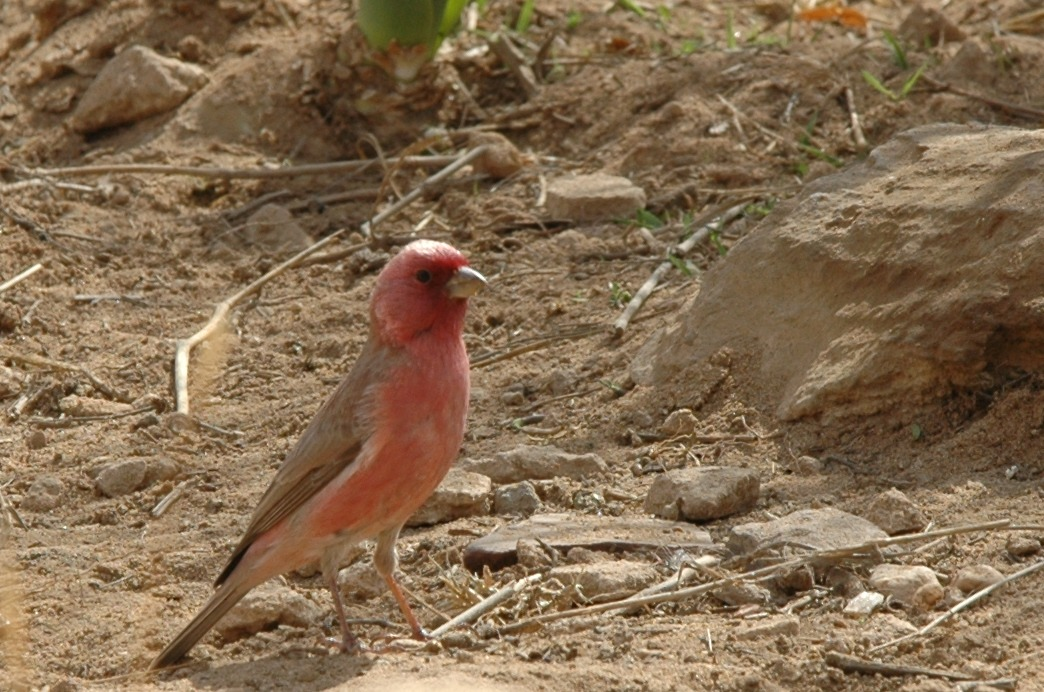
Jordan's national bird – Sinai rosefinch

The official national bird of Jordan is the Sinai rosefinch (Arabic: الطائر الوردي). It was chosen as the country's national bird because of its rosy color which is similar to the color of Petra, "The Red Rose City", and because of its large inhabiting of the Jordanian desert. It is present upon the reverse of the Jordanian one dinar bill.

== National flower ==
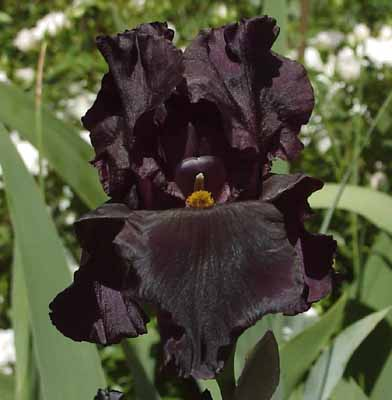
Jordan's national flower – black iris

Black iris (Arabic: السوسنة السوداء) is the national flower of Jordan and can be found all across the country, particularly in the Karak Governorate.

It blooms in the spring with dark black petals and is a national symbol of growth, renewal and change.

== National animal ==
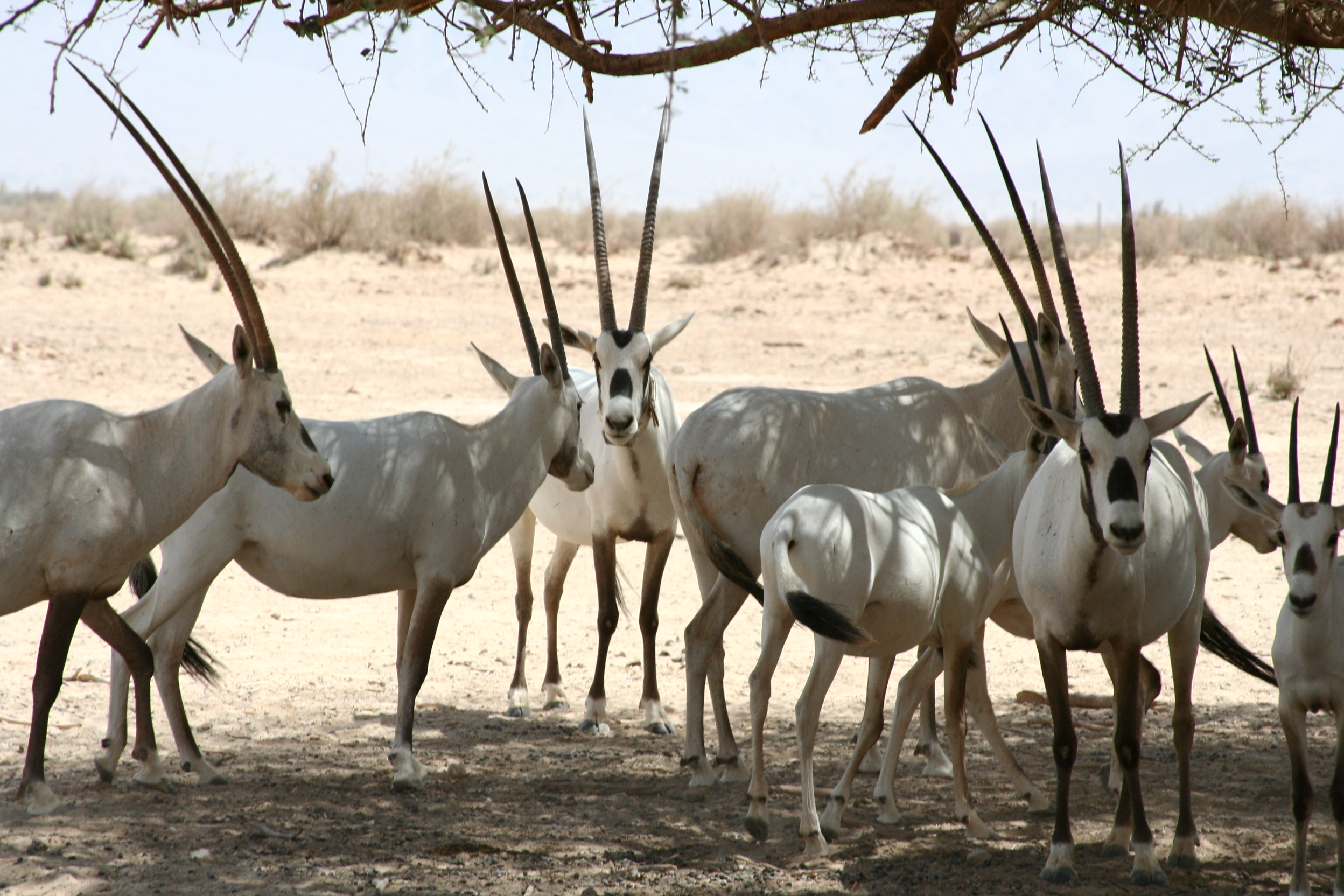
Arabian oryx

The Arabian oryx (Arabic: المها العربي) is the national animal of Jordan. The Arabian oryx is a medium-sized antelope with a distinct shoulder hump, long straight horns, and a tufted tail. It is a bovid, and the smallest member of oryx genus, native to desert and steppe areas of the Arabian Peninsula.

In 1978, four Arabian oryxes were brought to the Shaumari Wildlife Reserve for a breeding program. Starting in 1983, 31 oryxes were released into the wild, successfully returning the oryx into its native environment.

== National dish ==
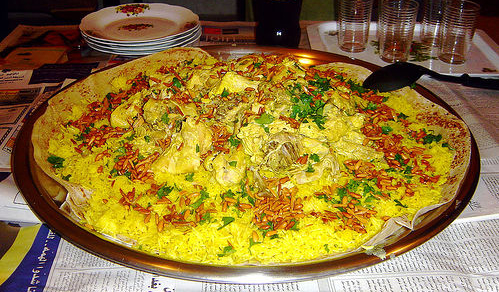
Mansaf

The national dish of Jordan is mansaf (Arabic: المنسف الاردني). Mansaf is the most distinctive Jordanian dish. It consists of lamb cooked in a creamy sauce made of yogurt (الجميد), served on a bed of rice.

Feasting of mansaf is taken very seriously, and it can take many hours to prepare. If mansaf is on the menu, Jordanians consider this to represent the height of generosity. It is usually served to mark special events, such as a graduation, a wedding or a holiday.
