= Yeruham Park =

Park in Israel

Coordinates: 30.988°N 34.903°E

Yeruham Park (also known as Yeruham Park and Lake, and incorporating the Yeruham Forest) is a large urban and ecological park located on the western outskirts of the town of Yeruham in the northern Negev, Israel. The park spans an area of approximately 3,000 to 4,000 dunams (around 740–990 acres), making it one of the largest green oases and planted woodlands in the Israeli desert. It features a massive artificial lake, extensive pine and eucalyptus forests planted by the Keren Kayemeth LeIsrael (KKL-JNF), ancient archaeological remains, and diverse wildlife habitats.

== History and development ==
The origins of the park date back to the early years of Israel's statehood. Following the establishment of Yeruham as a ma'abara (transit camp) in 1951, early development of the surrounding arid landscape began. In the 1950s and 1960s, KKL-JNF initiated extensive afforestation projects in the area, planting thousands of Aleppo pine, eucalyptus, and pistacia trees to combat desertification and provide local employment for new immigrants.

The defining feature of the park, Yeruham Lake, was originally created in the mid-1950s when the Jewish Agency and the Ministry of Agriculture constructed an earthen dam across the Revivim Stream (Wadi Revivim) to catch winter floodwaters for agricultural use. After the dam breached during several seasonal floods, KKL-JNF undertook a massive reconstruction and reinforcement project in 1992, elevating the dam to its current structure.

Over the decades, the park underwent environmental rehabilitation. Originally affected by pollution from nearby industrial runoff and poorly treated urban wastewater, joint efforts by the Yeruham Local Council, KKL-JNF, and environmental authorities restored the water basin. The park is now an ecotourism destination.

== Geographical and ecological features ==
=== Yeruham Lake and water system ===
The lake serves as a major hydrological anchor in the arid Negev landscape, filling up during the winter rainy season from the runoff of the central Negev hills. To ensure environmental sustainability, modern ecological restoration involved halting the influx of raw sewage, constructing a new wastewater treatment plant, and implementing constructed wetlands, natural filtration systems utilizing specialized aquatic vegetation to purify the water before it reaches the lake.

Biodiversity and Birdwatching

Due to its unique position as a permanent water body in the desert, the park is a crucial stopover, feeding, and wintering site for migratory birds traveling along the African-Eurasian flyway. Over 250 species of birds have been recorded in the park, including herons, cormorants, kingfishers, shorebirds, and rare desert songbirds. A birding center operates within the park, conducting scientific research, bird banding, and guided educational tours. To facilitate low-impact wildlife viewing, the park features a dedicated birding trail and accessible bird blinds (hides) near the water's edge.

The park also hosts a variety of desert mammals, such as porcupines, jackals, foxes, and gazelles, alongside a rich population of reptiles and amphibians.

== Archaeology ==
The area surrounding the park preserves a rich history of ancient desert habitation:

- Tel Yeruham: Located on a hill just north of the lake, this archaeological site contains remains of a human settlement dating back to the Middle Bronze Age (2200–2000 BCE).
- Mezad Yeruham (Yeruham Fort): Situated nearby on the Yeruham ridge, this site features fortifications, dwellings, and water cisterns from the Nabataean, Roman, and Byzantine periods, highlighting the historic importance of this oasis as a vital crossroads for desert traders and travelers.

== Tourism and recreation ==
Yeruham Forest is a recreational hub for local residents and domestic tourists, offering a range of amenities:

- Picnic Areas and Camping: The pine forests feature shaded lawns, picnic tables, and designated overnight camping grounds.
- Cycling and Hiking Trails: The park includes paved and unpaved paths wrapping around the lake and leading into the open desert, utilized for hiking, running, and mountain biking.
- The Iris Reserve: Located just outside the park boundaries is the famous Yeruham Iris Nature Reserve, which draws thousands of visitors every spring (primarily in March) to witness the blooming of the rare and endemic Yeruham Iris (Iris petrana).
