= Yeruham Dam =

Dam in Yeruham, Israel

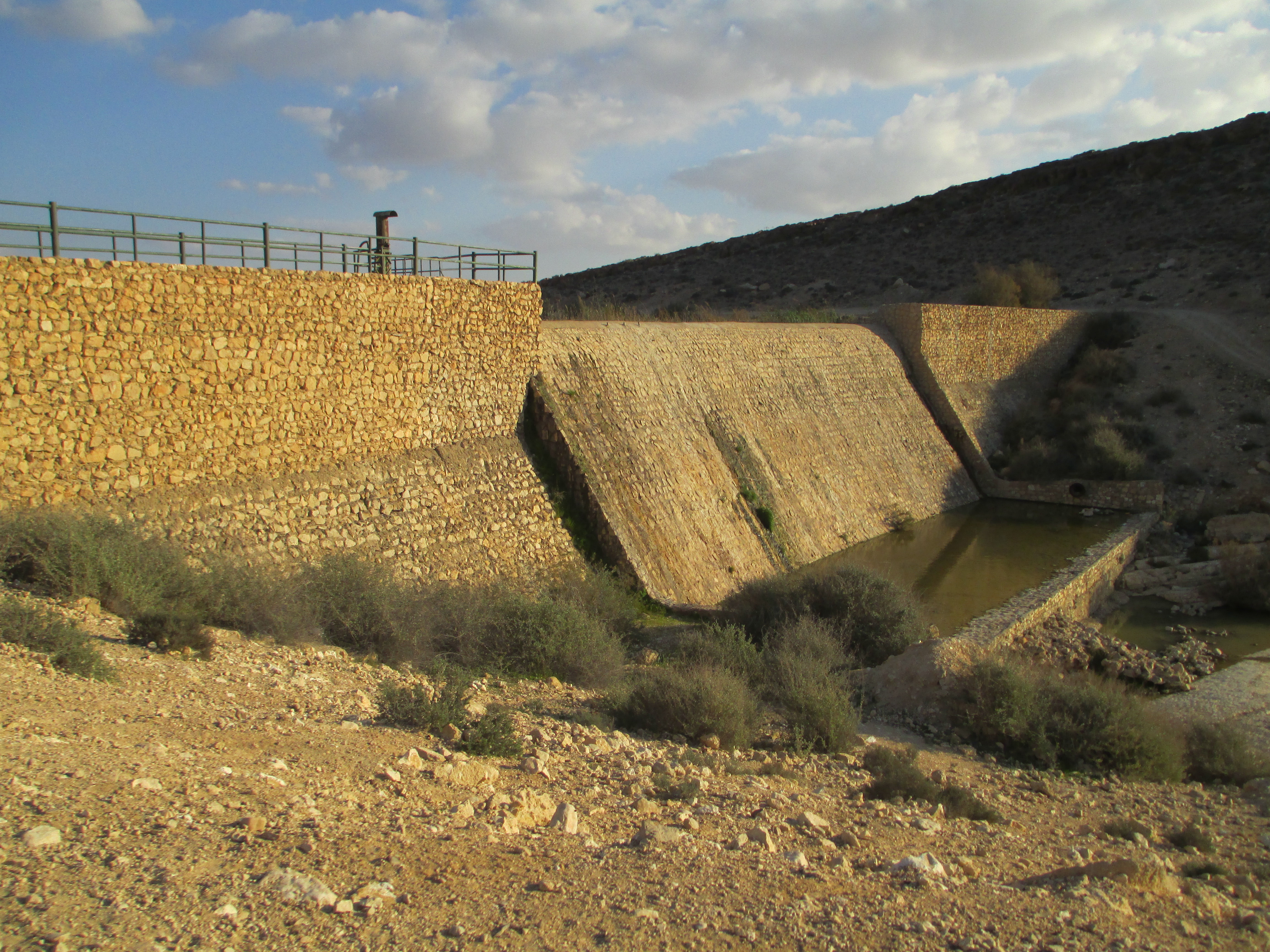
- Downstream face of the dam

- Location within Israel
- Country: Israel
- Location: Yeruham
- Coordinates: 30°59′23.28″N 34°53′29.08″E
- Purpose: Flood control, irrigation, municipal water, tourism, recreation
- Status: Operational
- Construction began: 1951
- Opening date: 1954; 72 years ago

Dam and spillways
- Type of dam: Masonry
- Impounds: Revivim Stream
- Height: 15 m (49 ft)
- Length: 80 m (260 ft)
- Spillway type: Overflow, uncontrolled

Reservoir
- Creates: Lake Yeruham
- Total capacity: 9,000,000 m^{3} (7,300 acre⋅ft)
- Surface area: 60.7 ha (150 acres)

Tel-Yeruham Dam, also known as Yeruham Dam, is a masonry dam situated on the Revivim Stream, a tributary of the HaBesor Stream, in Yeruham, Southern District, Israel. The dam has many purposes which include flood control, irrigation, municipal water supply, tourism and recreation. It impounded Lake Yeruham between 1953 and 1954. In 1974 the area around the lake was improved with plants and facilities to improve recreation.

== Construction ==
Construction on the dam began in 1951 and was completed 2 years later in 1953. After Construction, the dam had problems of leakage happening through the walls. Repairs were carried out and reduced the seepage losses of water from 30cm/day to 12mm/day.

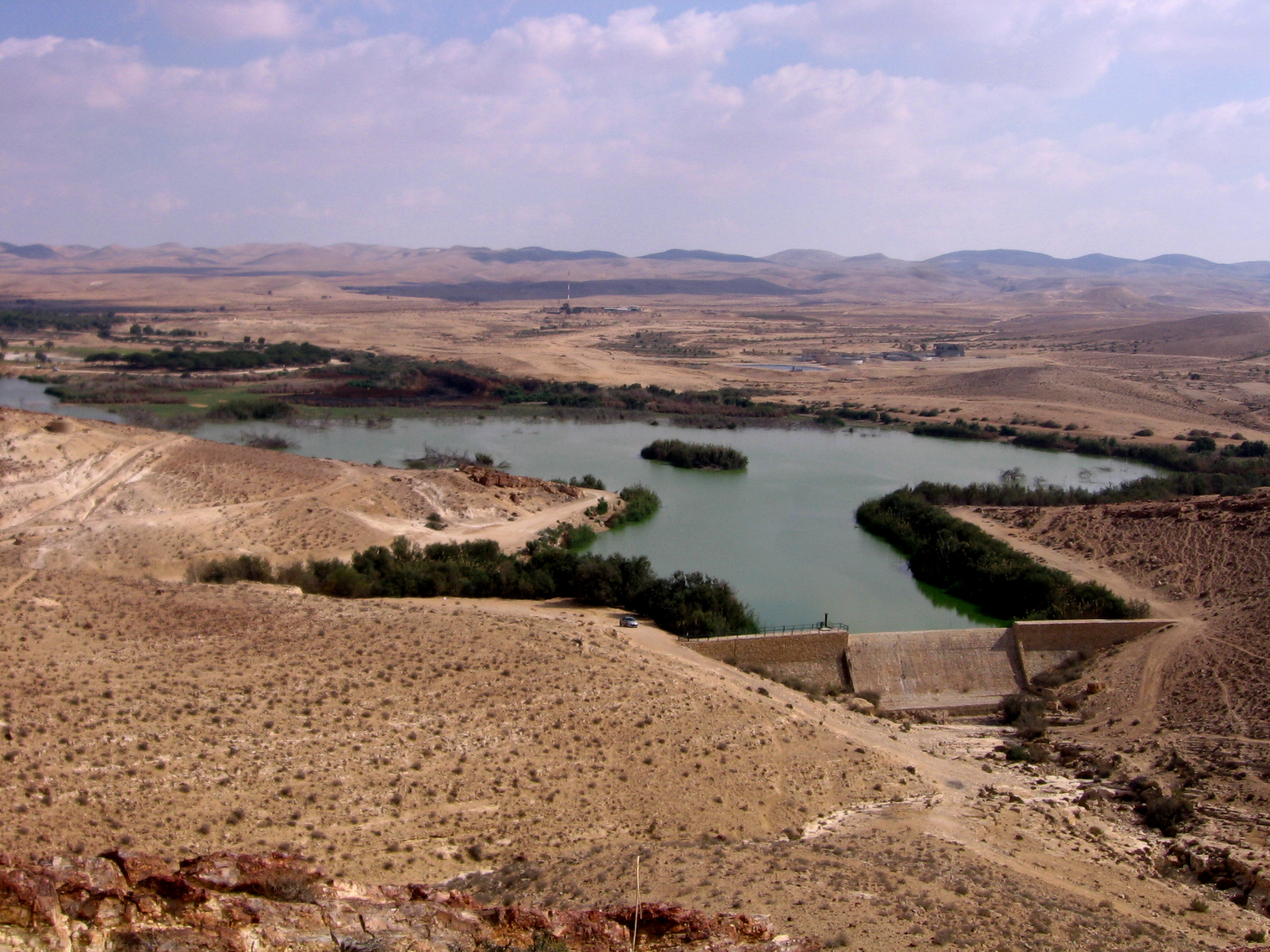
Yeruham Reservoir
