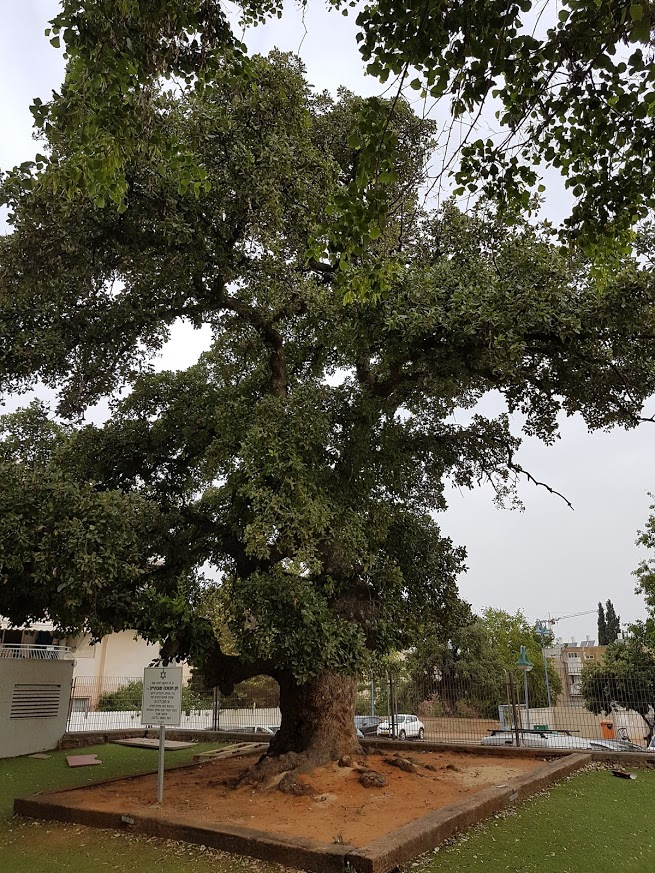

Conservation status
- Least Concern (IUCN 3.1)

Scientific classification
- Kingdom: Plantae
- Clade: Embryophytes
- Clade: Tracheophytes
- Clade: Spermatophytes
- Clade: Angiosperms
- Clade: Eudicots
- Clade: Rosids
- Order: Fagales
- Family: Fagaceae
- Genus: Quercus
- Subgenus: Quercus subg. Cerris
- Section: Quercus sect. Cerris
- Species: Q. ithaburensis

Binomial name
- Quercus ithaburensis Decne.
- Distribution map

Synonyms
- Of the species: Quercus aegilops var. ithaburensis (Decne.) Boiss.; Quercus aegilops subsp. ithaburensis (Decne.) Eig; Quercus macrolepis subsp. ithaburensis (Decne.) Browicz; Of subsp. macrolepis: Quercus aegilops subsp. macrolepis (Kotschy) A.Camus; Quercus aegilops subsp. pyrami (Kotschy) A.Camus; Quercus aegilops subsp. vallonea (Kotschy) A.Camus; Quercus aegilops L., nom. rej.; Quercus agriobalanidea Papaioannou; Quercus cretica Bald.; Quercus echinata Lam.; Quercus ehrenbergii Kotschy; Quercus graeca Kotschy; Quercus hypoleuca Kotschy ex A.DC.; Quercus macrolepis Kotschy; Quercus massana Ehrenb. ex Wenz.; Quercus pyrami Kotschy; Quercus vallonea A.DC.; Quercus vallonea Kotschy; Quercus ventricosa Koehne

= Quercus ithaburensis =

Species of tree

Quercus ithaburensis, the Mount Tabor oak, is a tree in the beech family Fagaceae. It is found from southeastern Italy to the Levant. It is the national tree of Jordan. Two subspecies are accepted, Quercus ithaburensis subsp. ithaburensis and Quercus ithaburensis subsp. macrolepis (syn. Quercus macrolepis, the Valonia oak). Together with Quercus brantii, it forms a clade of distinct, closely related species within the oak section Cerris.

== Description ==
Quercus ithaburensis is a small to medium-sized semi-evergreen to tardily deciduous tree growing to a maximum height of around 15 metres (49 feet) with a rounded crown and often with a gnarled trunk and branches. The leaves are 4–9 centimetres (1 1/2–3 1/2 inches) long and 2–5 cm wide, oval in shape, with 7 to 10 pairs of either teeth (most common) or shallow lobes (rare) along a revolute margin. They are dark glossy green above and gray tomentose below.

The male flowers are light green 5-cm long catkins while the wind-pollinated female flowers are small, up to 0.4 millimetres (1/32 in), produced in threes on short stalks called peduncles. Flowering occurs from March through April in most of its native range. The acorns are generally oval, up to 5 cm long and 3 cm wide with a cap covering roughly one-third of the acorn, maturing in 18 months, dropping from the tree in the second autumn after pollination. The cap is covered in long stiff loose scales which are rolled backward or involute, especially along the edges of the cap.

== Taxonomy ==
Two subspecies are accepted:

- Quercus ithaburensis subsp. ithaburensis – Turkey to the Palestine region
- Quercus ithaburensis subsp. macrolepis (Kotschy) Hedge & Yalt., syn. Quercus macrolepis, the Valonia oak – throughout the range of the species except the Palestine region

== Distribution and habitat ==
Quercus ithaburensis is native from the central and east Mediterranean basin. This oak grows in southeastern Italy, South Albania, coast areas and islands of Greece, South and West Turkey, Syria, Lebanon, Israel, the Palestinian territories, and Jordan.

Before the 20th century, the Plain of Sharon was covered by open woodland dominated by Quercus ithaburensis, which extended from Kfar Yona in the north to Ra'anana in the south. The local Arab inhabitants traditionally used the area for pasture, firewood and intermittent cultivation. The intensification of settlement and agricultural development, as well as the exploitation of native woodlands along the coastal plain by the Ottoman Empire (primarily in the form of timber for railroad construction) during the 19th century led to deforestation and subsequent environmental degradation - a theme commonly discussed in Hebrew sources.

== Uses ==
The cups of Quercus ithaburensis subsp. macrolepis, known as valonia, are used for tanning and dyeing as are the unripe acorns called camata or camatina. The ripe acorns are eaten raw or boiled.

Characteristic features of the tree
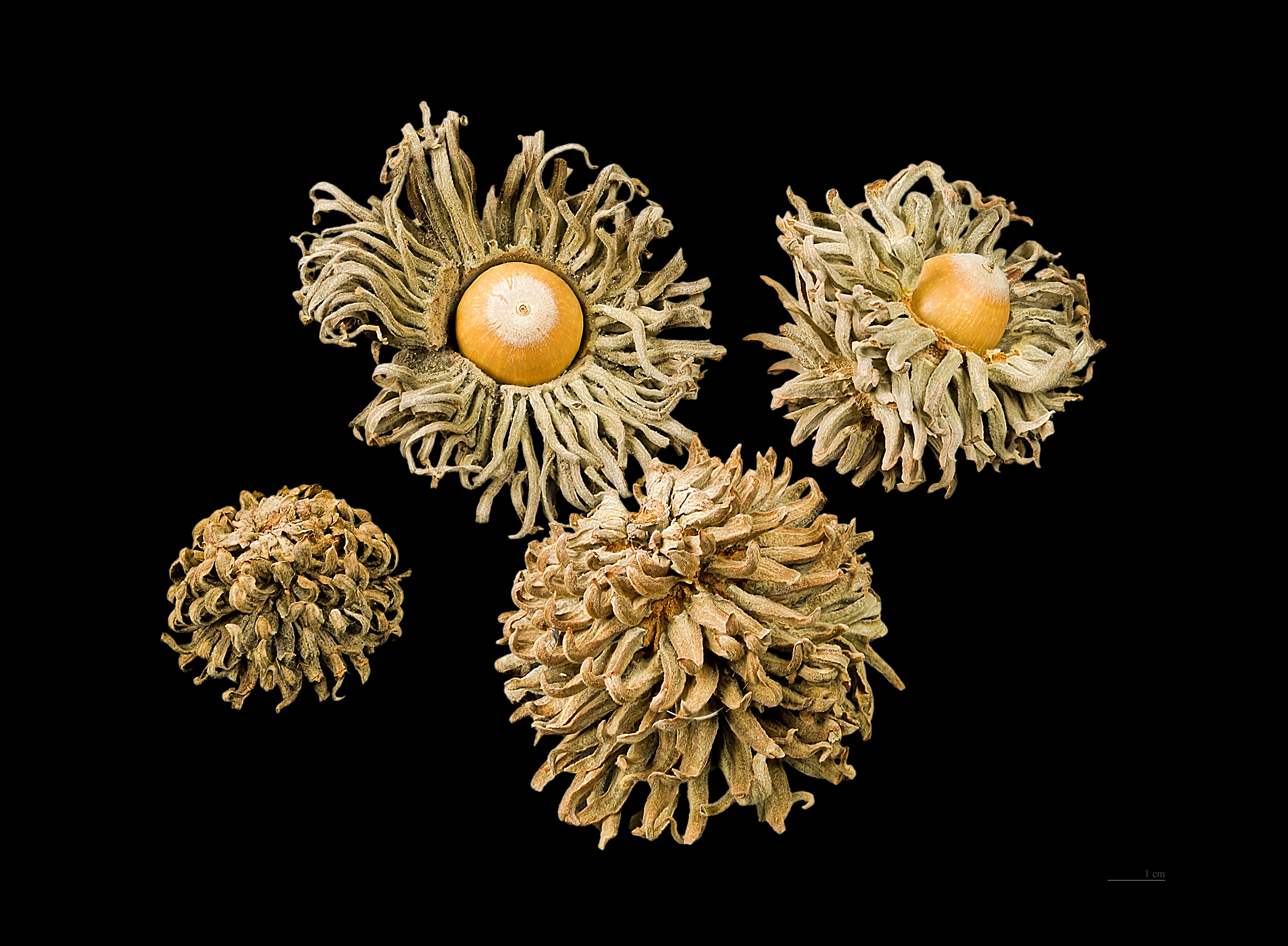
Typical appearance of the cups

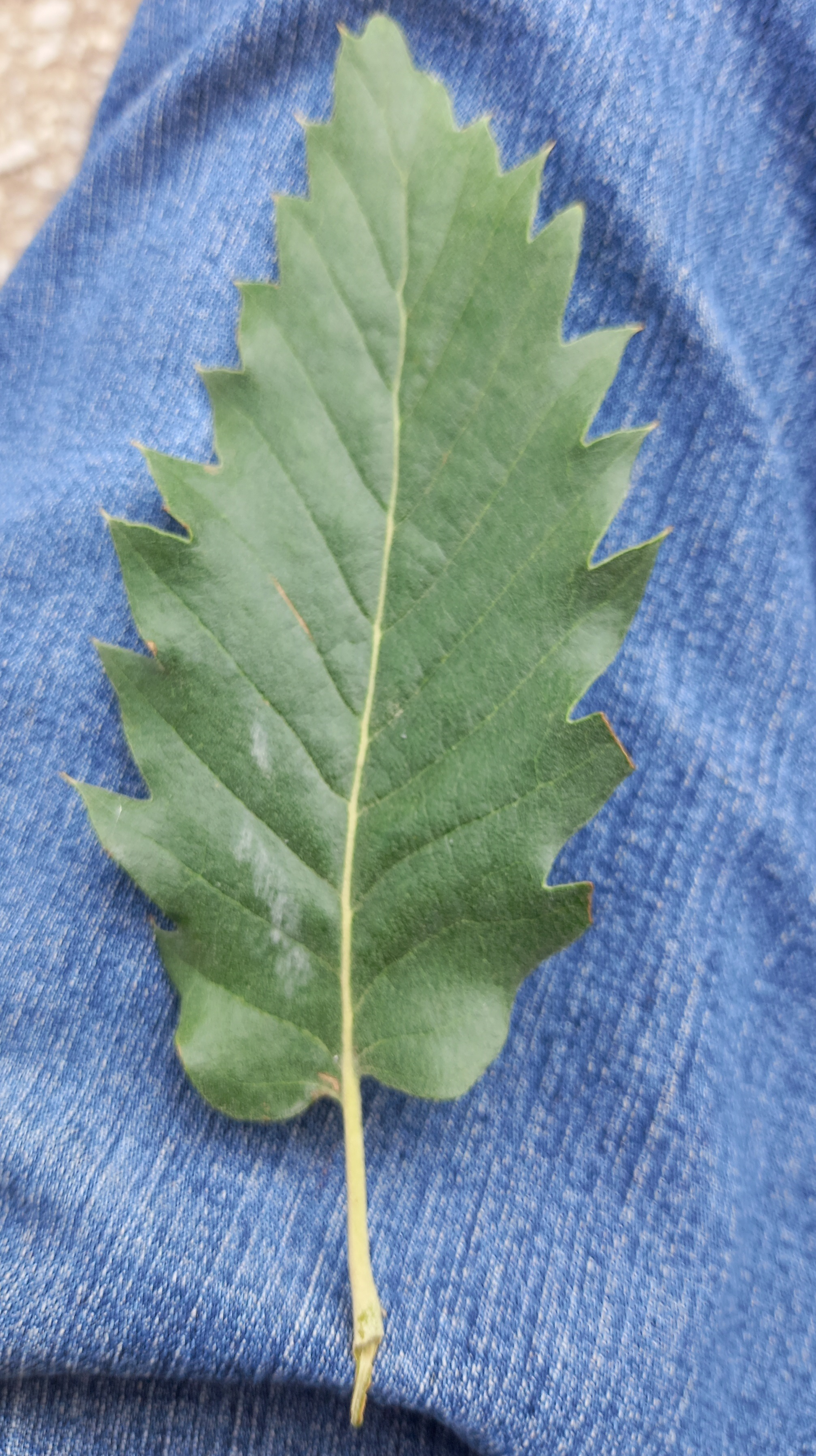
Typical oval-shape leave of Quercus ithaburensis

== See also ==
- Valoneic acid
