= Masorti on Campus =

American college Judaism organization

Masorti On Campus
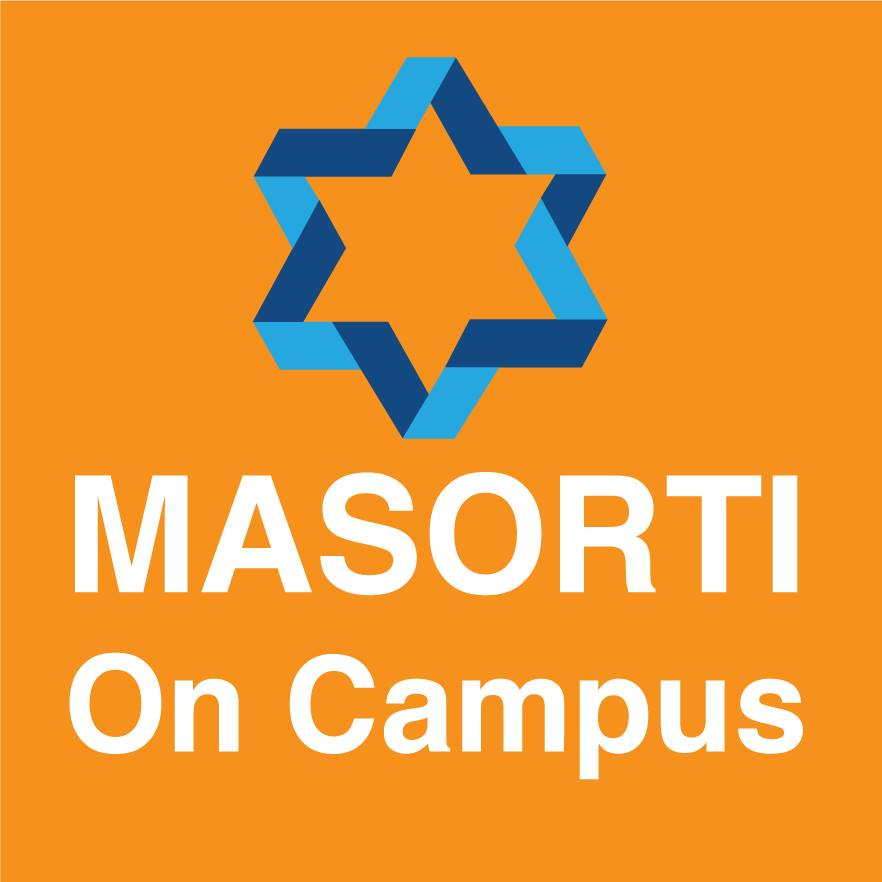
- Founded: July 2013 at JTS/Columbia University
- Founders: Eric Leiderman and Douglas Kandl
- Region served: North America
- Website: masorticampus.org

Masorti on Campus (MoC) is a student organization for Conservative Judaism (also known as "Masorti") on North American college and university campuses, working with Hillel and other Jewish campus life organizations.

== History ==
Masorti on Campus was launched in July 2013 by Eric Leiderman and Douglas Kandl in response to the closing of Koach by the United Synagogue of Conservative Judaism. Gaining the support of the Jewish Theological Seminary of America (JTS), MoC began its campaign to create a network for existing campus communities. In February 2014, the Seminary, along with Columbia University, hosted a student leadership conference. In order to further connect students and build new communities, Masorti on Campus announced a second conference with an expanded reach; speakers included the President of Hillel: The Foundation for Jewish Campus Life. One of the first campus communities to join was Rutgers University.

== List of Shabbatonim ==
Masorti on Campus signature program is the Shabbatonim, an international student leadership conference.

Year	Host Campus	Location	Reference
2014	Jewish Theological Seminary of America	New York City	
2015	University of Maryland, College Park	College Park, Maryland	
2016	Hofstra University	Hempstead, New York	
2017	Rutgers University	New Brunswick, New Jersey	
2018	University of Pennsylvania	Philadelphia	
2019	Columbia University	New York City	
2020	Brandeis University	Waltham, Massachusetts	

== See also ==
- Camp Ramah
- Nativ College Leadership Program in Israel
- United Synagogue of Conservative Judaism
- United Synagogue Youth
