= Stephen Daniel Arnoff =

Writer, musician, teacher and community builder

Dr Stephen Daniel Arnoff
- Born: Ohio, United States
- Citizenship: United States; Israel
- Education: The Jewish Theological Seminary of America; Brandeis University; NYU School of Law
- Children: 4
- Writing career
- Language: English; Hebrew
- Notable works: About Man and God and Law: The Spiritual Wisdom of Bob Dylan

Stephen Daniel Arnoff is a writer, musician, teacher and community builder.

Holding a doctorate in Midrash and Scriptural Interpretation from the Jewish Theological Seminary of America as a Wexner Graduate Fellow, Arnoff teaches and lectures at synagogues, conferences, community centers, universities, and private and corporate convenings around the world, specializing in the nexus of religion, spirituality, identity, and culture.

Formerly a Mandel Jerusalem Fellow, a Revson Fellow, and a Tikvah Scholar at the NYU School of Law, the Forward referred to Arnoff as "the godfather of New Jewish Culture" when he founded the 14th Street Y's LABA, which since 2007 has established Jewish artist residencies in New York City, the Bay Area, Berlin, Barcelona, Buenos Aires, and Istanbul. He has also served as the Chair of the Board for Jerusalem Culture Unlimited between 2017–2024.

== Career ==
=== Leadership and management positions ===
Since 2017, Dr. Stephen Daniel Arnoff has been the CEO of the Fuchsberg Jerusalem Center where he provides professional leadership for a vital center of education, culture and spirituality in Jerusalem, Israel. In 2015–2016, Arnoff served as the CEO and President of the JCC Association in New York, NY, where he represented more than 120 local JCCs to key organizations and donors in the North American Jewish community and primarily focused on strategic planning and management as well as issues of long-term visioning and positioning of JCCs in the wider community. Arnoff stepped down from this position in order to move back to Israel with his family.

As the Director of Culture, Community and Society at the Shalem College in Jerusalem, in 2013–2015 Arnoff supervised all non-academic student activity. In this position, he built and facilitated community service programs for students, managed cultural and non-academic programs and events, founded a weekly leadership seminar featuring leading figures in Israel and the Jewish world, and partnered with leading Israeli cultural and academic institutions.

In 2007–2013, Arnoff served as Executive Director of the 14th Street Y (New York, NY), where he supervised all the programs and operations of a JCC in the East Village of Manhattan. During this time Arnoff founded and directed the 14th Street Y's LABA: A Laboratory for Jewish Culture. Prior to this period, in 2002–2005, Arnoff served as the Founding Director of Artists Networks and Programming at the MAKOR/Steinhardt Center of the 92nd Street Y (New York, NY). In this role, Arnoff established the MAKOR Artists-in-Residence and was responsible for programming the MAKOR Theater, Gallery, and Lecture Hall. In 2000–2002, Arnoff served as the Founding Co-Director of The Artist Workshop Experiment (New York, NY and Jerusalem), where he created and facilitated intensive Jewish study workshops and public installations, events, and performances by and for artists from multiple disciplines in New York and Jerusalem (funded by the Bronfman Youth Fellowships).

=== Teacher ===
- Guest lecturer and scholar-in-residence at over 60 colleges, universities, cultural centers, conferences, and synagogues in North America, Israel, and Europe, 2007–present
- Faculty at Shalem College, Jerusalem, Israel: Myth, Religion and Popular Culture classes, 2013–2015
- Summer Faculty at Pardes Institute for Jewish Studies (Jerusalem, Israel): Midrash classes, 2005–2007
- Adjunct Lecturer at the Graduate School of the Jewish Theological Seminary, New York, NY: Graduate-level courses in Biblical Exegesis, Rabbinic Literature, and Religious Thought, 2004–2005
- Scholar-in-Residence at Brandeis-Bardin Institute, Simi Valley, CA: Planning and implementing curricula engaging traditional Jewish text and contemporary culture for young adults, 2001–2005

== Published works ==
His book About Man and God and Law: The Spiritual Wisdom of Bob Dylan, based on his popular podcast on the Pantheon Podcast Network, was published in 2022, and has been called "a revelation". Arnoff writes regularly for The Times of Israel, having served as Manager Editor of Zeek, and a contributor to The Forward, The Jerusalem Post, HuffPost, and more. He was awarded the Rockower Prize for Jewish Journalism for his essay on Philip Roth, and has contributed books on Jewish communal life, Bruce Springsteen, Bob Dylan, and contemporary spirituality.

=== Books ===
- About Man and God and Law: The Spiritual Wisdom of Bob Dylan, 2022

=== Chapters in books ===
- Dylan at Play, 2011
- Reading the Boss: Interdisciplinary Approaches to the Works of Bruce Springsteen, 2010
- Parole Nel Vento. I Migliori Saggi Critici Su Bob Dylan, 2008 (Italian Anthology of Twelve All-Time Best Articles on Bob Dylan)

=== Articles ===
- Seder Toharot (Ritual Purities), MyJewishLearning, 2003
- Trees and Their New Year in Rabbinic Judaism, MyJewishLearning, 2003
- Feminine Aspects of the Omer, MyJewishLearning, 2003
- The Concealed Face of God, MyJewishLearning, 2003
- Seder Nashim (Women), MyJewishLearning, 2003
- Methods of Midrash, MyJewishLearning, 2004
- A Jewish Artists Service Corps: Creating and Sustaining Community, Sh'ma: A Journal of Jewish Responsibility, 2005
- MAKOR Artists-in-Residence, Contact, 2005
- Yamim HaNorai'im Conversation Piece: Prayer, Ta-Shma, 2006
- Live By No Man's Code: The Religious Forms of Philip Roth's "Everyman", Zeek: A Jewish Journal of Thought and Culture, 2006
- In Memoriam: Welcome to Bob Dylan's "Modern Times", Zeek: A Jewish Journal of Thought and Culture, 2006
- Artneuland: Israeli Art without Borders, Zeek: A Jewish Journal of Thought and Culture, 2006
- A Recipe for Telling the Passover Story, JBooks, 2006
- South of the Border: Talking Peoplehood with Yossi Abramowitz, Zeek: A Jewish Journal of Thought and Culture, 2006
- What in the World Are We Longing For?, JBooks, 2006
- Consumers and Producers: Rethinking the Jewish Cultural Renaissance, Sh'ma: A Journal of Jewish Responsibility, 2006
- Listen to the New Josephs, The Jerusalem Post, 2007
- Doctorow Takes on the Creationists, JBooks, 2007
- The One that Got Away, Haaretz, 2007
- Jewish World We Need the Eggs, Haaretz, 2007
- He’s Not There (2007): Talkin’ Bob Dylan Symposium Blues, Zeek: A Jewish Journal of Thought and Culture, 2007
- Hey Judes: Dylan and the Beatles Transformed, Zeek: A Jewish Journal of Thought and Culture, 2008
- Jesus, Bob: To Live Outside the Law You Must Be Honest, The Forward, 2008
- Bob Dylan: Prophet, Mystic, Poet, The Forward, 2009
- Understanding the Myth and Music of Bob Dylan, The Forward, 2010
- Joshua Foer’s Memory Palace, The Forward, 2011
- Happy Birthday, Bob Dylan!, The Forward, 2011
- Addicted to Aggadah, The Forward, 2012
- Penn State Football By the Book of Numbers, HuffPost, 2012
- Exodus 13:17-17:16: Unbroken Bones, HuffPost, 2013
- Carl Jung, John Lennon and Joseph: The Shadow & the Beautiful Boy (Vayigash, Genesis 44:18-47:27), HuffPost, 2013
- Stuck Inside Bob Dylan and Llewyn Davis Again, HuffPost, 2014
- Bob Dylan in the 1980s: A Never Ending Tour of a Cantankerous Canon, HuffPost, 2014
- Leviticus: Keeping Holiness Simple (Behar, Leviticus 25:1-26:2), HuffPost, 2014
- 'I and I' (Parshat Vayishlach, Genesis 32:4-36:42), HuffPost, 2014
- Changing the Rules of the Game (Parshat B'ha'alot'kha, Numbers 8:1-12:16), HuffPost, 2015
- 'That's Why I Love Mankind' (Parshat Noah, Genesis 6:9-11:32), HuffPost, 2015
- By the People and for the People (Parshat Ki Tissa: Exodus 30:11-34:35), HuffPost, 2016
- Leonard Cohen;s message for the future, The Times of Israel, 2016
- Bruce Springsteen Says Make a Friend and "Raise Your Hand", HuffPost, 2017
- Bob Dylan Gets the Multitudes to Heaven, The Times of Israel, 2021
- Power, powerlessness, and Sukkot in ‘Borgen’, The Times of Israel, 2021
- From Dylan to Beyoncé: Spiritual Secrets Revealed, The Times of Israel, 2021
- To truly lead, Israeli officials should learn to paint, The Times of Israel, 2022
- Santos lies, Machiavelli sighs, and we get the leaders we deserve, The Times of Israel, 2023
- The Fringes That Do Not Have to Tear Us Apart, The Times of Israel, 2023
- This Year in Jerusalem, The Times of Israel, 2023
- Herzl and Lennon and the World As One, The Times of Israel, 2023
- A Nation Fit for a King, The Times of Israel, 2023
- The Impossible International, The Times of Israel, 2023
- Know us by our might and by our kindness, The Times of Israel, 2023
- Give Us Our Lives Back, The Times of Israel, 2023
- Broken English at Kibbutz Be’eri, The Times of Israel, 2023
- Everything You Want for Thanksgiving During War, The Times of Israel, 2023
- Mother of Muses, The Times of Israel, 2023
- Be Cool or Be Cast Out, The Times of Israel, 2023
- In Faith, Cut Out the Middle Man, The Times of Israel, 2023
- Like a Diamond in the Dark, The Times of Israel, 2024
- Is it the end of a Jewish Golden Age?, The Times of Israel, 2024
- Empathy or sympathy?, The Times of Israel, 2024
- Purim Is No Joke, The Times of Israel, 2024
- Faith in a Taxi, The Times of Israel, 2024
- Hope is mandatory, The Times of Israel, 2024
- Left Behind at Columbia University, The Times of Israel, 2024
- Alchemy in the City of Gold, The Times of Israel, 2024
- The World According to John Irving in Jerusalem, The Times of Israel, 2024
- 'Finally, Finally, Finally, You're Free', The Times of Israel, 2024
- New Light, Old Fear in a New Year, The Times of Israel, 2024
- Freedom and Nothing Left to Lose, The Times of Israel, 2024
- The Fog of War and T’shuvah, The Times of Israel, 2024
- Don't Follow Leaders, The Times of Israel, 2024
- Here's to the Rabbis, The Times of Israel, 2024
- The Crack-Up and the War, The Times of Israel, 2025
- A Change Is Gonna Come, The Times of Israel, 2025
- Jerusalem, Skinny Legs and All, The Times of Israel, 2025
- Find the Helpers, Pull the Espresso, The Times of Israel, 2025
- Get Drunk on Virtue, The Times of Israel, 2025
- Joy Is the Radical, Obvious Thing, The Times of Israel, 2025
- You Really Need a Rabbi, The Times of Israel, 2025
- Praying with Our Feet, The Times of Israel, 2025
- The Art of Memory, The Times of Israel, 2025
- The Parable Is Not Explained, The Times of Israel, 2025
- War Children, 2025, The Times of Israel, 2025
- Yes, Chef—Feeling Bearish in Israel, The Times of Israel, 2025

== Music and performance ==
=== Podcaster ===
- The Spiritual Wisdom of Bob Dylan, 3 Seasons, Pantheon Podcast Network, 2021–2023
- Beatles vs. Stones 02: 1964 - 'Hold Me, Love Me' featuring Stephen Daniel Arnoff, Featured Guest, Pantheon Podcast Network, 2021

=== Composer and music director ===
- The Tale of a Boy Who Would Be King, an original rock opera including text and arts curricula interpreting The Book of Jonah, Israel, Europe, and North America, 1998–2003
- Not of the King Alone, Gerard Behar Theater (Jerusalem), 1999
- How They Were Happy, the Yellow Submarine (Jerusalem), 1998
- A Simple Story, Gerard Behar Theater (Jerusalem), 1997
- Four Entered, an original song cycle based on Talmudic texts describing the four rabbis of the Pardes commissioned for the 25th anniversary of the Pardes Institute of Jewish Studies (Jerusalem), 1997

=== Singer, performer and instrumentalist ===
- Yovel, Roots, Common Ground, and solo performances in South Africa, Australia, Europe, North America, and Israel, 1988–1999
- Take 5, TV sit-com, Israel Educational Television Network, 1996–1998

== Awards and honors ==
- 2005: New Voices Prize, Jewish Family and Life! Media
- 2006: Rockower Jewish Press Award for Jewish Arts & Criticism, American Jewish Press Association

== Education ==
- The Tikvah Center for Law & Jewish Civilization at NYU School of Law, NY, NY, Tikvah Scholar, 2012–2013
- The Jewish Theological Seminary of America, NY, NY, Doctorate in Midrash and Scriptural Interpretation as a Revson and Wexner Graduate Fellow Fellow, 2002–2011
- Mandel School for Educational Leadership Fellow, Jerusalem, Israel, 2005–2007
- Beit Midrash Elul, Jerusalem, Member of Beit Midrash, 1997–1999
- The Arad Arts Project, Artist-in-Residence, Arad, Israel, 1995–1996
- Pardes Institute of Jewish Studies, Jerusalem, 1994–1995
- Brandeis University, Waltham, MA, Graduated Magna Cum Laude, BA in Near Eastern and Judaic Studies, 1994

== Personal life ==
Having made aliyah to Israel in 1994 and served in the IDF's Engineering Corps, Stephen Daniel Arnoff lives in Jerusalem with his four children. Dr. Arnoff has volunteered as the Board Chair of Jerusalem Culture Unlimited, an umbrella organization supporting management consulting, strategic planning and execution, resource development, and cultivation of partnership organizations for 50+ emerging arts and culture organizations in Jerusalem (2018–2024).
