= Beth El Synagogue (St. Louis Park, Minnesota) =

Jewish congregation in St. Louis Park, Minnesota

- Location in Minnesota

Religion
- Affiliation: Conservative Judaism
- Ecclesiastical or organizational status: Synagogue
- Status: Active

Location
- Location: 5225 Barry St W, St. Louis Park, Minnesota
- Country: United States
- Interactive map of Beth El Synagogue
- Administration: United Synagogue of Conservative Judaism
- Coordinates: 44°57′22″N 93°20′45″W

Architecture
- Established: 1920 (as a congregation)
- Groundbreaking: 1968
- Completed: 1926 (1st synagogue); 1970 (current synagogue)

Website
- besyn.org

Beth El Synagogue is a Conservative synagogue in St. Louis Park, Minnesota, a suburb immediately west of Minneapolis. It is affiliated with the United Synagogue of Conservative Judaism.

== History ==
In 1920 individuals started a group to meet on Friday nights to partake in services. This group was called the Young People's Synagogue and A.M. Heller served as rabbi. As the group expanded with more individuals it was hard to meet in a classroom. It was then discussed and decided that a synagogue would be built and the name of it would be Beth El. In November 1922, a house and lot were purchased.

To begin, the daily services were held in the little house. By June 1925, ground was broken and in September the cornerstone containing the names of the 25 original members was laid.

A new building was built on March 14–21, 1926. Activities in that location included Women's League, Young People's League, Talmud Torah classes, Boy Scouts, and Girl Scouts. The first confirmation class graduated in 1926. In 1930, Men's Club was organized and our Shofar (monthly bulletin) began publication. Aleph Preschool, began in 1939. As the number of families joining the synagogue was growing, there needed to be more room. On March 14, 1948, the Bet Hamidrash and Community House were built.

In the early 1950s, Beth El Memorial Park was purchased and constructed. The Board approved the purchase of land in St. Louis Park. Ground was broken for the Youth and Activities Building on September 17, 1961. Activities continued at both buildings, youth and educational activities at the new building, all others at the other location. On June 7, 1968, the final service at 1349 Penn North was held and the building was sold to the city of Minneapolis on June 10. In the fall of 1968, groundbreaking occurred in St. Louis Park.

In the new building, High Holiday services were held in Convention Hall. The new synagogue building was opened in 1970.
