= Conservative Yeshiva =

Institute for the study of traditional Jewish texts

Coordinates: 31.7756°N 35.2184°E

The Conservative Yeshiva in Jerusalem
- Formation: 1995
- Location: Agron Street 8, Jerusalem
- Rosh Yeshiva: Rabbi Joel Levy
- Affiliations: Masorti/Conservative Judaism
- Website: www.fuchsbergcenter.org

The Conservative Yeshiva is a co-educational institute for study of traditional Jewish texts in Jerusalem. The yeshiva was founded by Stephen G. Wald in 1995 is part of the Fuchsberg Jerusalem Center. As of 2023, the Rosh Yeshiva is Rabbi Joel Levy.

The Yeshiva offers Jews from outside the Orthodox world the opportunity to gain the advanced Jewish learning and communal experiences provided by attending a yeshiva. It uses a synthesis of traditional and critical methods, allowing Jewish texts and tradition to encounter social change and modern scholarship. The curriculum focuses on classical Jewish subjects, including Talmud, Tanakh, Midrash, halakha, and philosophy. Learning is conducted in the traditional yeshiva method (shiur and chavruta) with an openness to modern scholarship.

The Yeshiva's educational programs include a one-year program and advanced studies programs.

== Notable faculty ==
- Rabbi Joel Levy, Rosh Yeshiva
- Rabbi Dr. Joshua Kulp, Senior Scholar & co-founder
- Rabbi Joel Roth Rosh Yeshiva Emeritus

== See also ==
- Fuchsberg Jerusalem Center
- United Synagogue of Conservative Judaism
- Nativ College Leadership Program in Israel
- Yeshivat Hadar
