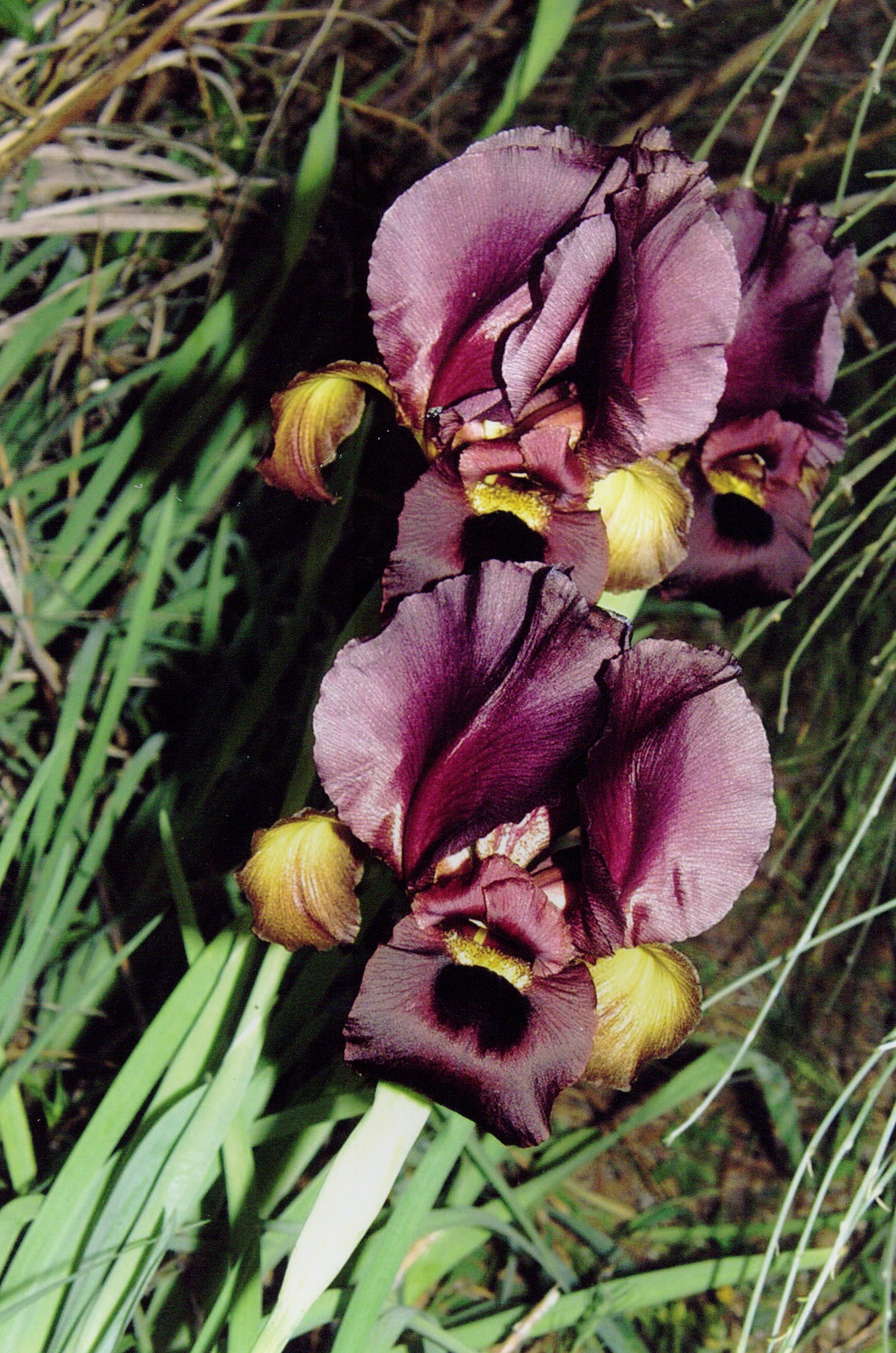

Scientific classification
- Kingdom: Plantae
- Clade: Tracheophytes
- Clade: Angiosperms
- Clade: Monocots
- Order: Asparagales
- Family: Iridaceae
- Genus: Iris
- Species: I. petrana

Binomial name
- Iris petrana Dinsm.

Synonyms
- None known

= Iris petrana =

Species of plant

Iris petrana, commonly known as the Petra iris, is a species in the genus Iris, it is also in the subgenus of Iris and in the Oncocyclus section. It has spring blooming flowers that come in shades from burgundy, dark brown to dark violet and purple. They have yellow or dark 'beards' and flower over sword-like grey-green leaves. It is normally found in the desert sands between the countries of Jordan and Israel-Palestine.

== Description ==
I. petrana has a small brown rhizome.

It has waxy, sword-like leaves that are greyish green. These may reach up to 25 cm (10 in) tall and can form small low tufts.

The plant can reach up to between 20–25 cm (7.9–9.8 in) tall. Normally, the stalk of the plant holds a flower head high above the foliage, raising it to pollenisers.

The plant blooms early in the year, between March and April. It also can bloom as early as February, after the spring rains.

The large flowers are between 5–7 cm (2–3 in) in diameter, and come in dark shades ranging from dark brown or burgundy through to dark violet or dark purple. In certain lights the flowers appears to be nearly black.

Like other irises, it has two pairs of petals: three large sepals (outer petals), known as the 'falls', and three inner, smaller petals (or tepals), known as the 'standards'. The upright standards are obovate or unguiculate (claw-like) in shape, with dark veining.

The falls are oblong or ovate shaped with a signal patch that is virtually black. In the middle of the falls, there is a row of short hairs called the 'beard', which is mostly orange, yellow, or dark-tipped on a cream ground.

After the iris has flowered, it produces a seed capsule. The seeds are 3 mm in size and the wind disperses them from the seed capsules. The elaiosome (fleshy coating) of seeds of the iris are rolled by the wind along the soil surface near the plant and collected later by ants. The seeds have arils (a coating) which the ants seem to prefer.

=== Biochemistry ===
Most irises are diploid, having two sets of chromosomes. This can be used to identify hybrids and classification of groupings. It was counted in 1980 by Awishai & Zohary. It has a chromosome count of 2n=20.

== Taxonomy ==
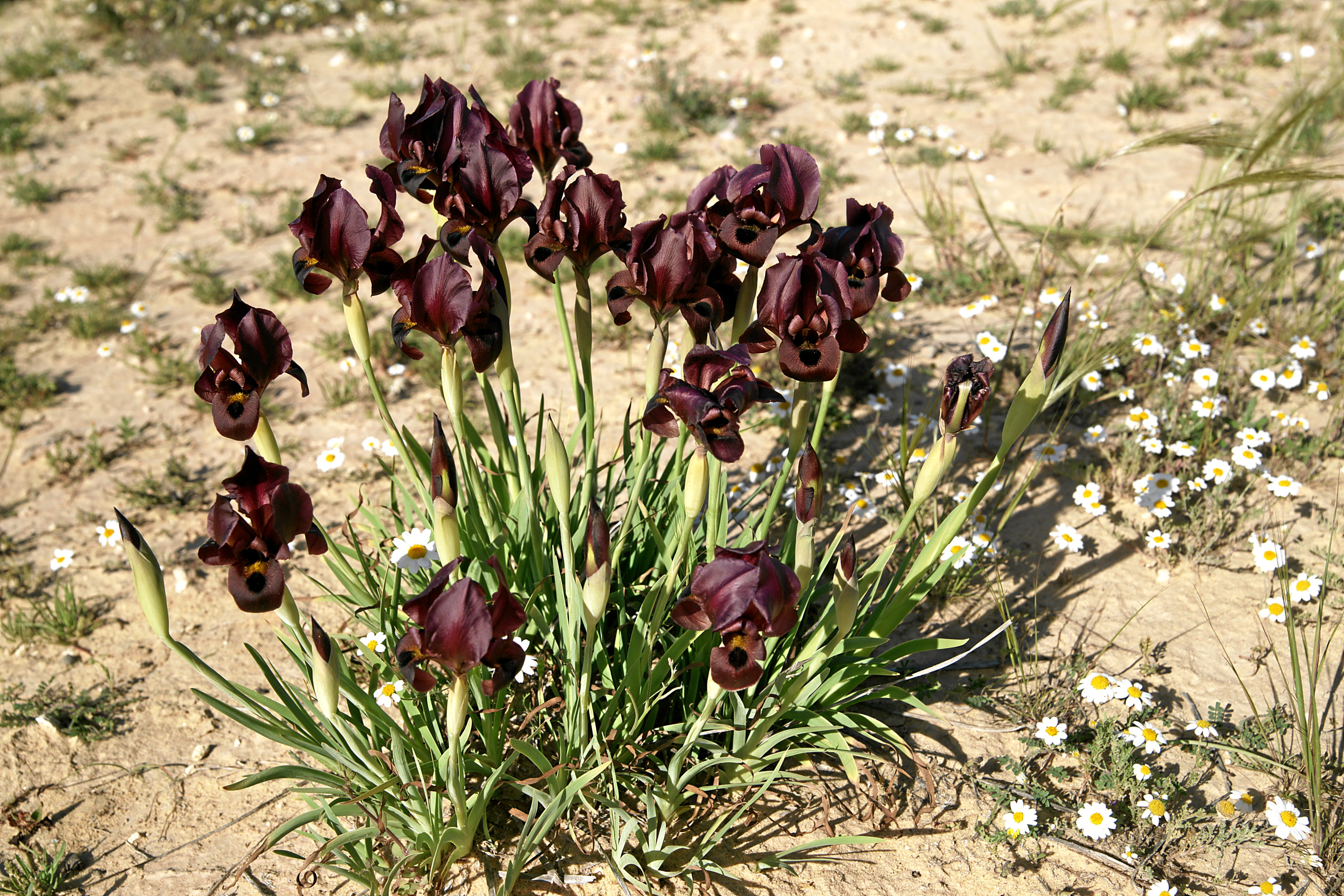

It has the common name of Petra iris, and it is written in the Hebrew script as איריס הנגב .

It is named after Petra (the historical and archaeological city in southern Jordan). Other plants similarly named are Kickxia petrana Danin (now known as Nanorrhinum petranum (Danin) Yousefi & Zarre), and Origanum petraeum Danin.

It was found in Ziza, Katrani (about halfway between Ma'an, Syria and Amman) in Palestine, then first described and published by John Edward Dinsmore in Fl. Syria, Palest. & Sinai, Edition 2 on page 599 in 1933.

In 1939, it was downgraded and thought to be a synonym of Iris nigricans, but in 1986 Naomi Feinbrun-Dothan in her book Flora Palaestina Vol. 4, she returned it back to a species.

They are still sometimes misnamed as I. nigricans (and called the black iris).

In the 1970s, a population of irises was found in Yeruham, Israel and botanist Avishay proposed that they were new and named them I. hieruchamensis. He did not formally publish his opinions, and later Feinbrun concluded they were the same species as found in the Negev desert.

It is listed in Encyclopedia of Life. and it was verified by United States Department of Agriculture and the Agricultural Research Service on 4 April 2003.

== Distribution and habitat ==
It is native to temperate Asia.

=== Range ===
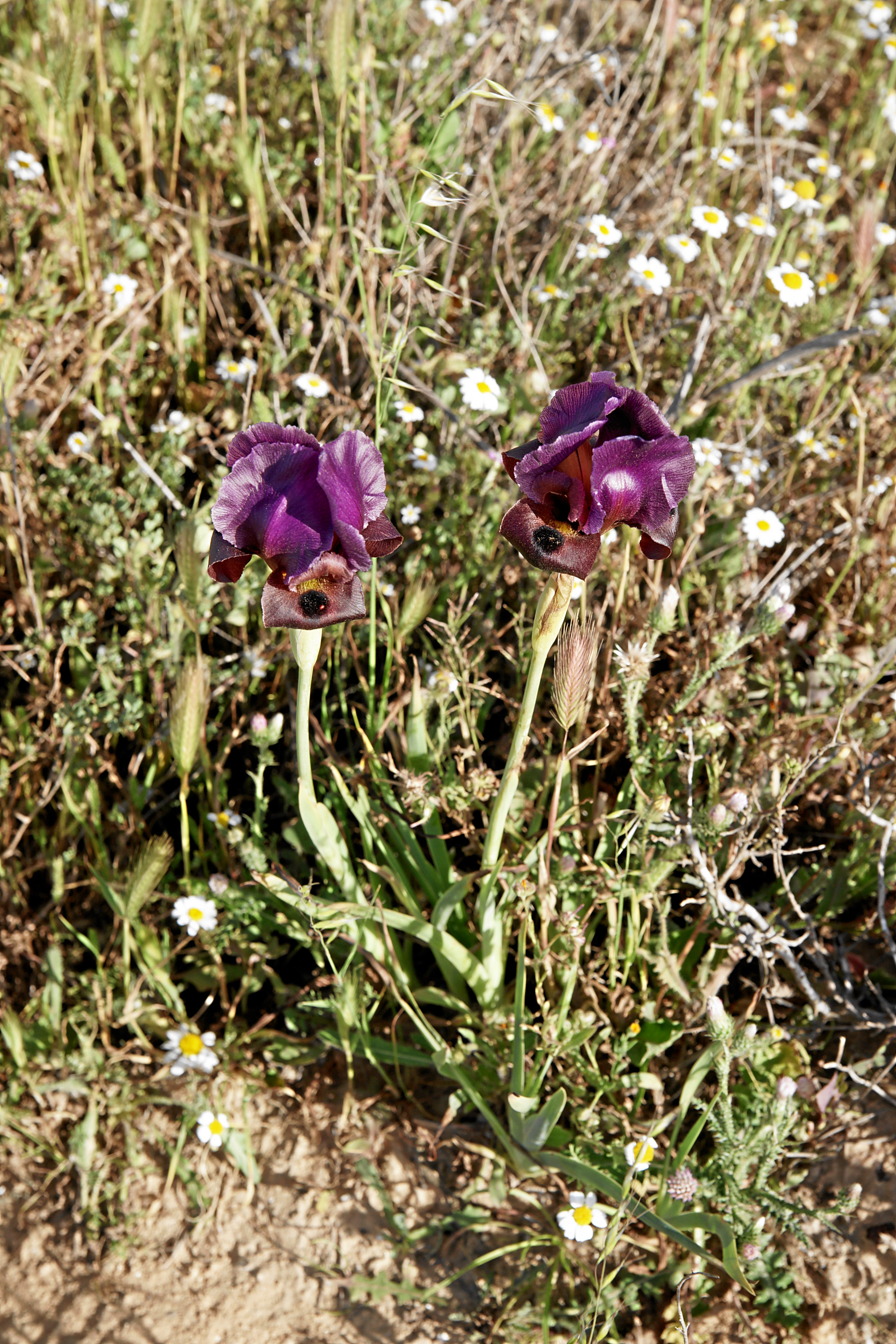

It is found in southern Jordan, (near the town of Tafilah) and also in Israel, mainly the Negev desert. It is also found on the eastern side of Wadi Araba in the Dead Sea basin (which is between Jordan and Israel).

=== Habitat ===
I. petrana grows mainly in the desert, on sandy loess plains and the stabilized sand fields above neogene (created) sandstone. It is also found in the marginal lands by the edge of the desert. They can be found at an altitude of 430 to 570 m (1,410 to 1,870 ft) above sea level.

== Conservation ==
Since the 1950s, there has been a drastic decline in the population size and the number of iris plants found in the wild. The attractive flowers were picked in the wild, and uncontrolled grazing by animals also damaged plants.

In Jordan, various developments have threatened its existence and destroyed various habitats.

In Israel, it has been included on the endangered species list. It is included in the Red Book of Endangered Plants in Israel by Avi Schmid, Gadi Polk and Uri Fergman-Sapir. It has now been limited to one region, close to the town of Yeruham. The protected site Yeruham Iris Nature Reserve was created. It covers about 15 acres of almost total desert with just some spring foliage dotted here and there. Within the reserve, controlled grazing by animals has encouraged plant growth, but destructive grazing must be kept to a minimum, especially where the leaves of the irises and flowers have been eaten.

It is not on the IUCN Red List of Threatened Species.

=== Synecology ===
Within the Yeruham Iris Nature Reserve, it grows with mounds of Echiochilon fruticosum, the blue Siberian lily Ixiolirion tataricum and a hyacinth relative called Leopoldia longipes subsp. negevensis. It is normally found in groups of plants, with 20 or more flowers, all blooming at the same time.

== Cultivation ==
It requires well-drained soil and not too much water at any time, especially in the summer (after flowering). If it receives too much water or moisture, it becomes susceptible to various viruses.

=== Propagation ===
Irises can generally be propagated by division, or from seed.

== Toxicity ==
Like many other irises, most parts of the plant are poisonous (rhizome and leaves), and if mistakenly ingested can cause stomach pains and vomiting. Also, handling the plant may cause a skin irritation or an allergic reaction.

== Other sources ==
- Al-Eisawi, D.M., 1986. Studies on the flora of Jordan 12. Monocotyledons new to Jordan, with notes on some interesting species. Kew Bull., 41: 349-357.
- Al-Eisawi, DMH, 1998 Field Guide to Wild Flowers of Jordan and Neighboring Countries. Amman, Jordan: Commercial Press
- Al-Khader, I.A., 1997. Systematic revision of the genus Iris (Iridaceae) in Jordan. M.Sc. Thesis, University of Jordan, pp: 2.
- Danin, A. 2004. Distribution atlas of plants in the Flora Palaestina area.
- Mathew, B. 1981. The Iris. 57.
- Sapir, Y. et al. 2002. Morphological variation of the Oncocyclus irises (Iris: Iridaceae) in the southern Levant. Bot. J. Linn. Soc. 139:369-382.
- Zohary, M. & N. Feinbrun-Dothan. 1966-. Flora palaestina.
