= Fuchsberg Jerusalem Center =

Israeli Conservative Judaism organization

The Fuchsberg Jerusalem Center
- Formation: 1972
- Purpose: Spiritual
- Headquarters: Jerusalem
- Location: Agron Street 8, Jerusalem, Israel
- Coordinates: 31.77551°N 35.21843°E
- Region served: Israel
- Executive Director: Dr. Stephen Daniel Arnoff
- Chair: Diane Katz
- Affiliations: Masorti/Conservative Judaism
- Website: www.fuchsbergcenter.org

The Fuchsberg Jerusalem Center was founded in 1972 by the United Synagogues of Conservative Judaism as the central organization for Conservative Judaism in Israel. Fuchsberg Jerusalem Center houses the Conservative Yeshiva (CY), Moreshet Yisrael synagogue, and the Agron Guest House managed by the Israel Youth Hostel Association. The current Chief Executive Officer of Fuchsberg Jerusalem Center is Dr. Stephen Daniel Arnoff.

== Founding ==
Founded in 1972 by the leaders of the United Synagogues of Conservative Judaism to establish a center for Torah study, hospitality, and to be exposed to the Jerusalem/Israel experience.

== Yeshiva (Beit Midrash) ==
The Fuchsberg Jerusalem Center Yeshiva is a co-educational institute for study of traditional Jewish texts. The Yeshiva was founded in 1995 and the current Rosh Yeshiva is Rabbi Joel Levy.

The Yeshiva enables people outside the Orthodox Jewish world to gain the advanced Jewish learning and communal experiences provided by attending a Yeshiva. The Yeshiva offers a synthesis of traditional and critical methods, allowing Jewish texts and tradition to encounter social change and modern scholarship. The curriculum focuses on classical Jewish subjects, including Talmud, Tanakh, Midrash, Halacha, and philosophy. Learning is conducted in the traditional yeshiva method (shiur and chavruta) with an openness to modern scholarship.

The Yeshiva's educational programs include a one-year program, pre-college program, advanced studies program, summer program, and winter program. The Nativ College Leadership Program in Israel ceased to operate in 2024.

== See also ==
- Conservative Yeshiva
- United Synagogue of Conservative Judaism
- Nativ College Leadership Program in Israel
- Jewish Theological Seminary of America
