= United Synagogue Youth =

Jewish Conservative youth organization

- Logo
- Abbreviation: USY
- Formation: 1951
- Type: Youth organization
- Headquarters: New York, NY
- Location: 3080 Broadway, New York, NY 10027
- Region served: North America
- Members: 15,000
- Sr. Director of Teen Engagement: Julie Marder
- President: Jackson Powers
- Key people: Programming Vice President - Brady Abrams; Jewish Life Vice President - Akiva Olitzky; Outreach Vice President - Sydney Shapiro; Communications Vice President -Elijah Klawans
- Main organ: International Executive Board, International General Board, Teen Leadership Council, International Youth Commission
- Parent organization: United Synagogue of Conservative Judaism (USCJ)
- Affiliations: Conservative Judaism
- Website: www.usy.org

United Synagogue Youth (USY) is the youth movement of the United Synagogue of Conservative Judaism (USCJ). It was founded in 1951, under the auspices of the Youth Commission of what was then the United Synagogue of America.

USY operates in the United States and Canada, with 350 chapters across 15 regions. Gesher (Hebrew for "Bridge"), formerly known as Kadima, is USY's program for grades 5 to 8 (varies by region).

== History ==
Under the leadership of both Rabbi David Aronson and Rabbi Kassel Abelson, the first USY chapter was founded at Beth El Synagogue in Minneapolis in 1948 to provide for the social and spiritual needs of its teens. Soon, other synagogues began following suit.

“The Youth Commission unanimously agrees that the teenage groups come under the general supervision of the Youth Commission. Teenage groups should include boys and girls of high school level, 13 to 17 years inclusive…The Youth Commission shall concern itself with non-scholastic group work for teenagers.” With these words, on March 19, 1951, USY was formed nationally at its first convention, bringing together delegates from synagogues and other youth groups across the country, along with lay and professional youth workers of USCJ. All told, more than 500 people, representing 65 communities from 14 states and Canada attended the first official meeting of USY. At that convening, under the leadership of the newly elected national president, Paul Freedman, the two basic documents of the organization, Aims and Objectives and the USY Constitution, were adopted.

In 1956, the Two-o-Nine tzedakah (charity) project began (later revamped to become Tikun Olam (Repairing the World), the social action/charity project that all contemporary USYers recognize). The Tikun Olam Fund supports Jewish causes; many of these benefit non-Jews as well, but they are rooted in Jewish values.

That same summer, twelve USYers went on the first organization sponsored trip to Israel. Known as the USY Israel Summer Pilgrimage, it became the first of the USY summer programs. Two years later, Pilgrimage enrollment had already increased to 100 teens. In 1961, USY further expanded its summer programs when two staff members took four USYers on their “Schlep and Pray Across the USA,” the first USY on Wheels trip.

In 1969, the Youth Commission created Kadima, the youth group for middle school and junior high students.

USY has 350 local chapters in 15 regions across North America.

== Structure and leadership ==
USY has three main levels of entry into the organization: chapter, regional, and international. The HaNegev and METNY regions are also split into sub-regions and divisions, respectively.

=== Chapter ===
Chapters, typically run out of local USCJ congregations, provide programming on the local level. This includes social, religious, educational, and community service-based programming. Social programming ranges from lounge and movie nights to pool parties and paintballing. Religious, educational, and community service-based programming include mock-seders, Israel education, and volunteering.

All programming is planned by the chapter's executive and general boards with the guidance of the chapter's advisor. Typically, a given chapter's name is an acronym of the synagogue or city in which the chapter is based followed by the letters "USY". Congregation Beth Judea, for example, would be shortened to BJUSY. All chapters are associated with a USCJ-affiliated synagogue.

=== Regional ===
Regions consist of chapters in the same geographical area. Regions gather for bi-monthly, quarterly, and annual regional events, such as weekend-long kinnusim (conventions) and week-long encampments. There are 15 USY regions.

Each region has a regional executive board (REB), which serves as the region's cabinet, tending to its needs across the year. An REB typically consists of a president, and five vice presidents: Israel affairs VP (IA), religion/education VP (Rel/Ed), social action/Tikun Olam VP (SA/TO), membership/Kadima VP (Mem/Kad), and communications VP (comm). Some regions incorporate an executive vice president and/or parliamentarian position. In regions that have divisions or sub-regions, divisional or sub-regional presidents are automatically granted REB member status.

==== Sub-Regional/Divisional ====
Larger USY regions are occasionally split into sub-regions or divisions. The sub-regions and divisions act much like regions, overseeing their respective chapters, and holding their own conventions and elections. Currently, there are four regions, Emtza, HaNegev, METNY, and FWUSY, with sub-regions or divisions. HaNegev's sub-regions are each led by a three-person executive board. METNY's divisions are each led by a six-person executive board. FWUSY's communities are each led by a five-person executive board. HaNegev's three sub-regions are Arvot (South Florida), Mercaz (North and Central Florida), and Ein Gedi (Florida Panhandle, Georgia, Alabama, Mississippi, Tennessee, North Carolina, and South Carolina). METNY's three (previously five) divisions are Emek (Hudson Valley), Sababa (Manhattan, Queens, and Brooklyn), and Ruach (Long Island). FWUSY's three communities are Los Angeles, SD/OC (San Diego County and Orange County), and Midbar (Arizona, Colorado, and Nevada).

==== Branches ====
In the spring of 2019, USY combined regions into branches. There are six branches. Each region maintains its individual regional identity, but the leadership has shifted to one team running two to three regions.

=== International ===
USY held an International Convention (IC), the largest gathering of Conservative Jewish teens in North America, and runs summer trips across the United States, Canada, Israel, and Europe. The last IC was held in 2019 in Southern California, as the 2021 IC in Washington, DC was cancelled due to Covid-19. In January of 2027, a USY International Winter Convention will take place in Atlanta, GA. Visit usy.org/shabbaton for more information.

The five-person International Executive Board (IEB) includes a president and four vice presidents. The committees of the International General Board (IGB) are appointed and overseen by the IEB. The IEB is elected by USYers on Zoom and the members serve for one school year.

== Programs ==
=== USY Summer Experience ===
USY runs simultaneous four-to-seven-week summer programs across North America and Europe. The trips through Europe culminate in Israel.

USY on Wheels is a six-week bus tour throughout the continental United States, Canada, and Alaska. Participants spend the summer visiting America's greatest landmarks, including the Grand Canyon and Pier 39, as well as the country's more obscure destinations including the Corn Palace and Wall Drug. The program's goal is giving teens the opportunity to understand what it means to live Jewishly no matter where you go. Participants stay in both hotels and home hospitality. Participants keep Kosher and pause to celebrate Shabbat throughout the summer. In addition to the "Classic" Wheels trip, other travel options include:

- Wheels East, a four-week east coast trip exclusively for 7th and 8th grades
- Wheels West, a four-week west coast trip exclusively for 7th and 8th graders
- Pacific Northwest, a three-week trip that includes two-weeks on the West Coast and a one-week Alaskan cruise

USY's trips to Israel, USY Israel Pilgrimage, consist of an optional week in Poland or Eastern Europe followed by a month in Israel, learning about Jewish communities and the Shoah (Holocaust). Pilgrimage trips visit every major city and region, including Jerusalem, Tel Aviv, Haifa, Tiberias, Beersheba, and Eilat. In addition to city life, the program incorporates many hiking opportunities and outdoor experiences, in areas including the Golan Heights, the Jordan River, the Galilee the Mediterranean Sea, Masada, the Dead Sea, the Negev, the Red Sea, and archaeological digs of ancient Jewish civilization, all led by professional tour guides. Another option for Israel Pilgrimage is L'Takayn Olam, a program that blends social action and volunteering with sightseeing.

USY also partners with the DREAM Project for DREAM USY, a two-week social action trip in the Dominican Republic.

=== International Convention ===
USY's International Convention, commonly referred to as IC, was the largest gathering of Conservative Jewish teens.

Held annually the last full week in December, the convention moved to a different North American city each year and convened hundreds of Jewish teens for five days of celebration, friendship, Jewish learning, and giving back to the local community.

The location changed from year to year, covering several USY regions over a period of a few years. The 2016 International Convention was held in Dallas, Texas (SWUSY Region) on December 25–29, 2016. During the week of the Convention, USYers participated in community service, leadership, religious, educational, cultural, and social programming. The 2017 International Convention was held in Chicago, Illinois. The 2019 International Convention took place in Ontario, California.

== Interest clubs ==
USY offers three interest clubs for USY members.

The Abraham Joshua Heschel Honor Society is a club for USY members of secular and religious academic excellence. The club is named after prominent theologian and activist Abraham Joshua Heschel. Members meet during regional conventions to discuss topics that Heschel wrote about. The Heschel Honor society holds an annual three-day, text-focused convention every March. The Heschel Honor Society recognizes USYers committed to the study of Torah, prayer, and performance of G’milut Chasadim (acts of loving kindness).

Chalutzim is the USY Israel advocacy club, helping relationship developments with the Jewish homeland through programming, workshops, and fun activities. In Hebrew, Chalutzim means “pioneers,” referring to the original settlers in modern-day Israel.

613 Mitzvah Corps (commonly referred to as 613) is USY's Social Action/Tikun Olam (Repairing the World) or SA/TO club. The club was designed for USYers who wish to be more involved in social action and learn more about social activism within the context of Judaism.

== List of regions ==
Name of region	Details of name	Areas covered
CHUSY	Chicago USY	Northern Illinois, Milwaukee, and Madison
CRUSY	Central Region USY	Ohio, Western Pennsylvania, Michigan, Indiana, Kentucky, and West Virginia
ECRUSY	Eastern Canadian Region USY	Toronto, The GTA, Hamilton, London, Montreal and Ottawa
EMTZA USY	Hebrew: אמצע, "Middle"	Colorado, Iowa, Kansas, Minnesota, Missouri, Nebraska, Western Wisconsin, and Manitoba
Far West USY		Southern California, Arizona, Nevada, New Mexico, Hawaii, and Utah
HaNer USY	Hebrew: הנר, "The candle" (formed from Hanefesh and NERUSY)	Connecticut, Massachusetts, Rhode Island, Vermont, New Hampshire, and Maine
HaNegev USY (Sub-Regions: Arvot, Mercaz, Ein Gedi)	Hebrew: הנגב, "The Negev"	Florida, Georgia, Alabama, Mississippi, Tennessee, Arkansas, South Carolina, North Carolina, Barbados, and Puerto Rico.
Megalil USY	formed from METNY and Hagalil USY	New York City, Long Island, Westchester County, Rockland County, and New Jersey.
Mizrach USY	Hebrew: מזרח, "East" (formerly known as EPA/Hagesher USY)	Philadelphia, Main Line, Bryn Mawr, Bucks County and Southern New Jersey Eastern and Northern Pennsylvania from Harrisburg to Scranton
New Frontier USY		Northern California, and Reno
LMUSY	Lower Mainland USY	British Columbia and Alberta
Seaboard USY		Maryland, Washington, D.C., Northern North Carolina, and Virginia
SWUSY	Southwest USY	Texas, Oklahoma, and Louisiana
Tzafon USY	Hebrew: צפון, "North"	Upstate New York, Western Massachusetts, and Southwestern Vermont

Visit USY.org to learn more about USY in your area

== See also ==
- Camp Ramah - a network of Conservative Jewish summer camps across North America and Israel
- Nativ - the post-high-school gap year program operated by USCJ
- United Synagogue of Conservative Judaism - the organization of Conservative Jewish synagogues in North America
- Koach - a now-defunct, college campus organization affiliated with Conservative Judaism
- Conservative Judaism - a leading modern denomination of Judaism
- Judaism - the religion of the Jewish people
