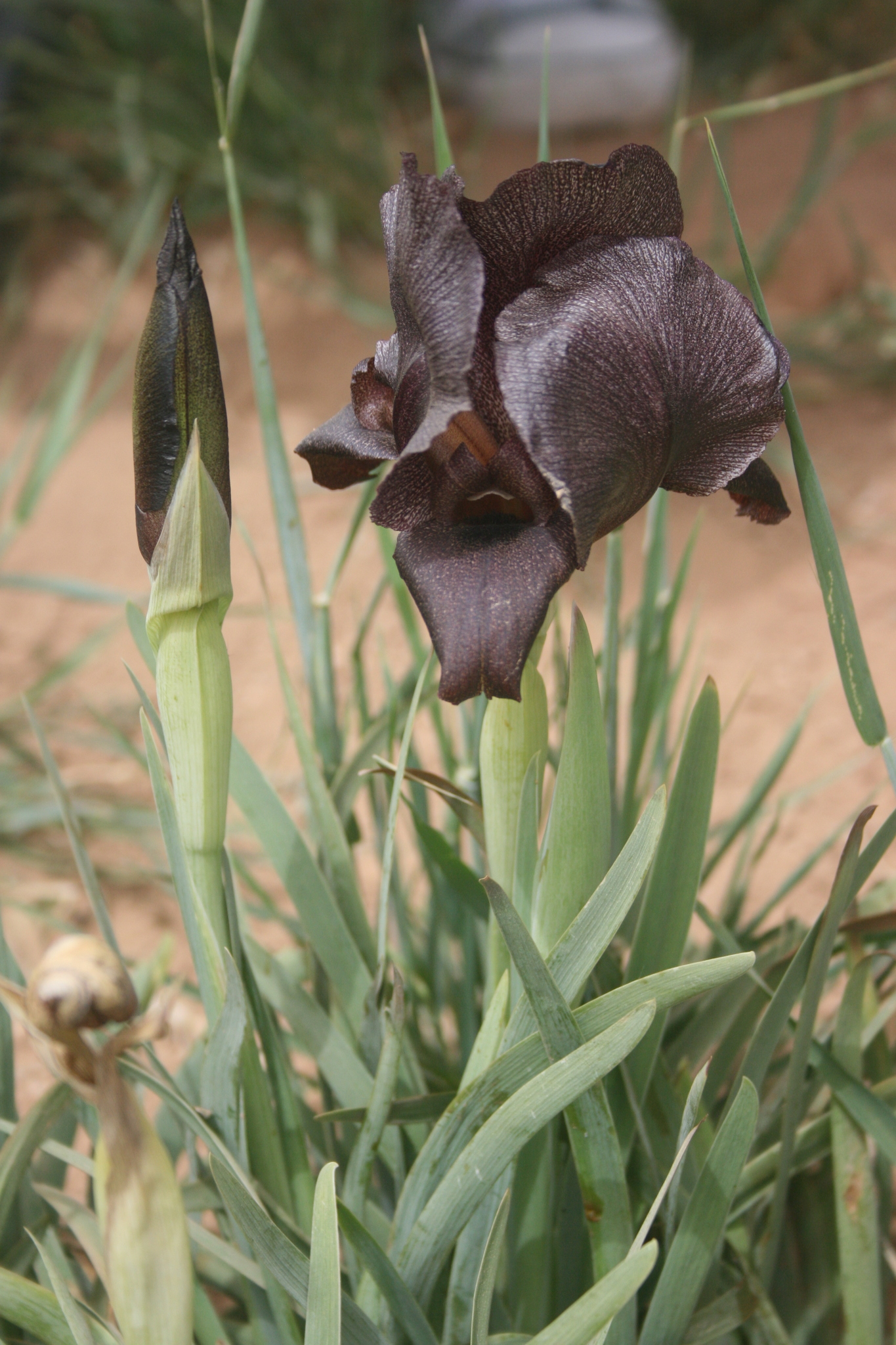

Conservation status
- Vulnerable (IUCN 3.1)

Scientific classification
- Kingdom: Plantae
- Clade: Embryophytes
- Clade: Tracheophytes
- Clade: Spermatophytes
- Clade: Angiosperms
- Clade: Monocots
- Order: Asparagales
- Family: Iridaceae
- Genus: Iris
- Subgenus: Iris subg. Iris
- Section: Iris sect. Oncocyclus
- Species: I. nigricans

Binomial name
- Iris nigricans Dinsm.

= Iris nigricans =

Species of flowering plant

Iris nigricans is a flowering plant in the family Iridaceae. It is the national flower of Jordan. The flowers are blackish-purple and 12–15 centimetres (4.7–5.9 in) in diameter, and the plants are 35 cm (14 in) tall with recurved leaves. It needs direct sun and sharp drainage. It is endemic to Jordan and is an endangered species.

There are 8 other irises native to Jordan, and most of these are also endangered. The species bearing black flowers are sometimes confused with Iris nigricans.

- Iris vartanii - Vartanii Iris - light blue flowers - extinct in Jordan
- Iris atrofusca - Jil'ad Iris - black flowers - endangered
- Iris atropurpurea - Purple Iris - black flowers - cultivated but vulnerable in the wild
- Iris petrana - Petra Iris - black flowers
- Iris germanica - German Iris - purple flowers
- Iris postii - Post Iris - purple flowers
- Iris edomensis - Edom iris - white flowers with black spots - endangered
- Iris aucheri - Desert Iris - various colors
