= United Synagogue of Conservative Judaism =

Conservative Jewish organization in the United States

Coordinates: 40.7507488°N 73.9710554°W

- Abbreviation: USCJ
- Formation: February 23, 1913; 113 years ago
- Founder: Rabbi Dr. Solomon Schechter
- Tax ID no.: 13-1659707
- Legal status: 501(c)(3) religious organization
- Purpose: To strengthen kehillot; to ensure there are thriving centers of Jewish practice across North America, Israel, and beyond that celebrate both tradition and contemporary life; to demonstrate what an authentic and dynamic Judaism looks like, inspire people to be a part of it, and advance its critical role in the world.
- Headquarters: 3080 Broadway, New York, New York, U.S.
- Region served: North America
- Members: 562 affiliated congregations
- Chief Executive Officer: Rabbi Jacob Bluementhal
- International President: Andy Schaer
- Affiliations: Conservative Judaism
- Revenue: $12,404,867 (2022)
- Expenses: $12,214,528 (2022)
- Website: uscj.org
- Formerly called: United Synagogue of America

The United Synagogue of Conservative Judaism (USCJ) is the major congregational organization of Conservative Judaism in North America, and the largest Conservative Jewish communal body in the world. USCJ closely works with the Rabbinical Assembly, the international body of Conservative rabbis. It coordinates and assists the activities of its member communities on all levels.

== History ==
Representatives of twenty-two Jewish congregations in North America met at the Jewish Theological Seminary on 23 February 1913. The representatives formed the United Synagogue of America to develop and perpetuate Conservative Judaism. The group elected Rabbi Solomon Schechter the first president.

At its executive council's April 1913 meeting, the organization's purpose was defined as loyalty to the Torah; to promote observance of Shabbat and Jewish dietary laws; to preserve Israel's past and promote its restoration; to maintain traditional Jewish prayer in Hebrew; to promote traditional Judaism in the home; and to encourage the establishment of Jewish religious schools whose instruction includes the study of the Hebrew language and its literature as a bond that unites Jewish people worldwide.

The name of the organization was changed to the United Synagogue of Conservative Judaism in 1991.

== Role and description ==
United Synagogue of Conservative Judaism has 572 affiliated congregations as of 2017.

== Programs ==
USCJ sponsors the following programs:

- United Synagogue Youth (USY) is the youth movement of USCJ. The organization's mission is to empower Jewish youth to develop friendships, leadership skills, a sense of belonging to the Jewish People, a deep engagement with and love for Israel, and a commitment to inspired Jewish living through meaningful and fun experiences based on the ideology of Conservative Judaism.
- Nativ was USCJ's academic gap year program in Israel for incoming college freshmen. After 41 years of operation, the program ended with the 2023–2024 cohort.
- The Conservative Yeshiva in Jerusalem is USCJ's learning community in Israel.

== See also ==
- Masorti on Campus
- United Synagogue Youth
- Fuchsberg Jerusalem Center
