= Jewish religious movements =

Denominations of Judaism

Jewish religious movements, sometimes called "denominations", include diverse groups within Judaism which have developed among Jews from ancient times, including Karaite Judaism and the majority group, Rabbinic Judaism. Samaritans are also considered ethnic Jews by the Chief Rabbinate of Israel. However, experts frequently classify them as a sister ethnicity practicing a separate branch of Yahwism. Today in the West, the most prominent divisions are between traditionalist Orthodox movements (including Modern Orthodox Judaism and the ultratraditionalist Haredi Judaism) and modernist movements such as Reform Judaism originating in late 18th century Europe, Conservative Judaism originating in 19th century Europe, and other smaller ones, including Reconstructionist Judaism and Jewish Renewal movements, which emerged later in the 20th century in the United States.

In Israel, variation is moderately similar, differing from the West in having roots in the Old Yishuv and pre-to-early-state Yemenite infusion, among other influences.

For statistical and practical purposes, the distinctions are based upon a person's attitude to religion. Most Jewish Israelis classify themselves as "secular" (hiloni), "traditional" (masorti), "religious" (dati) or "ultra-religious" (haredi).

The western and Israeli movements differ in their views on various issues (as do those of other Jewish communities). These issues include the level of observance, the methodology for interpreting and understanding Jewish law, biblical authorship, textual criticism, and the nature or role of the messiah and the Messianic Age. Across these movements, there are marked differences in liturgy, especially in the language used in services, with the more traditional movements emphasizing Hebrew. The sharpest theological division occurs between traditional Orthodox and the larger number of non-Orthodox Jews adhering to other movements (or none), so that the non-Orthodox are sometimes referred to collectively as the "liberal" or "progressive streams".

Other divisions of Judaism in the world reflect being more ethnically and geographically rooted, e.g., Beta Israel (Ethiopian Jews), and Bene Israel (among the ancient Jewish communities of India).

Normatively, Judaism excludes certain groups that may name or consider themselves ethnic Jews but hold key beliefs in sharp contradiction, for example, Messianic Judaism, a branch of Protestant Christianity. Historically, the split between Jewish Christianity versus Judaism and Samaritanism became significant with the adoption of Christianity as the Roman state religion.

== Terminology ==
Some Jews reject the use of the term denomination as a label for different groups and ideologies within Judaism, arguing that the notion of a denomination has a specifically Christian resonance that does not easily translate into the Jewish context. However, in recent years, the American Jewish Year Book has adopted "denomination", and so have many scholars and theologians.

Commonly used terms are movements, as well as denominations, varieties, traditions, groupings, streams, branches, sectors and sects (for some groups), trends, and such. Sometimes, as an option, only three main currents of Judaism (Orthodox, Conservative and Reform) are named traditions, and divisions within them are called movements.

The Jewish groups themselves reject characterization as sects. Sects are traditionally defined as religious subgroups that have broken off from the main body, and this separation usually becomes irreparable over time. Within Judaism, individuals and families often switch affiliation, and individuals are free to marry one another, although the major denominations disagree on who is a Jew. It is not unusual for clergy and Jewish educators trained in one of the liberal denominations to serve in another, and left with no choice, many small Jewish communities combine elements of several movements to achieve a viable level of membership.

Relationships between Jewish religious movements are varied; they are sometimes marked by interdenominational cooperation outside of the realm of halakha (Jewish law), such as the New York Board of Rabbis, and sometimes not. Some of the movements sometimes cooperate by uniting with one another in community federations and in campus organizations such as the Hillel Foundation. Jewish religious denominations are distinct from, but often linked to, Jewish ethnic divisions and Jewish political movements.

== Samaritanism ==
The Samaritans consider themselves direct descendants of the tribes of Ephraim and Manasseh in the Northern Kingdom of Israel, which was conquered by Assyria in 722 BC. Modern genetics suggests some truth in both the Samaritan claims and the Talmudic Jews' claims.

The Samaritan Torah preserves a version of the Torah in slightly altered forms. The first historical references to the Samaritans date from the Babylonian captivity. According to the Talmud, the Samaritans are to be treated as Jews in matters in which their practices conform to the mainstream, but are otherwise treated as non-Jews. The Samaritans have dwindled to two communities of about 840 individuals. One such community is located in the Israeli city of Holon, while the other is located near Nablus on Mount Gerizim, in the West Bank .

Today, Samaritans must officially undergo a formal conversion to Judaism in order to be considered Jewish. One example is Israeli singer and actress Sofi Tsedaka, who was raised Samaritan and converted to Judaism at the age of 18.

== Sects in the Second Temple period ==
Prior to the destruction of the Second Temple in 70 CE, Jews of the Roman province of Judaea were divided into several movements. Sometimes these movements warred among themselves: Pharisees, Sadducees, Essenes, Zealots, and ultimately early Christians. Many historic sources such as Flavius Josephus, the New Testament and the recovered fragments of the Dead Sea Scrolls, attest to the divisions among Jews at that time. Rabbinical writings from later periods, including the Talmud, further attest these ancient schisms.

The main internal struggles during this era were the struggles between the Pharisees and the Sadducees, as well as the struggles between the early Christians, the Essenes and the Zealots. The Pharisees wanted to maintain the authority and traditions of classical Torah teachings and to achieve this goal, they began the early teachings of the Mishna, maintaining the authority of the Sanhedrin, the supreme Jewish court. According to Josephus, the Sadducees differed from the Pharisees on a number of doctrinal grounds, notably, they rejected the belief in life after death. They appear to have dominated the aristocracy and the temple, but their influence over the wider Jewish population was limited. The Essenes preached an ascetic way of life. The Zealots advocated armed rebellion against any foreign power such as Rome. All were at violent logger-heads with each other, leading to the confusion and disunity that ended with the destruction of the Second Temple and the sacking of Jerusalem by Rome. The Jewish Christians were the original Jewish followers of Jesus. The radical interpretation of Moses' Law by Jesus' disciples and their belief he is the Son of God, along with the development of the New Testament, ensured that Christianity and Judaism would become distinctively different religions.

== Rabbinic Judaism ==
Most streams of modern Judaism developed from the Pharisaic movement, which became known as Rabbinic Judaism with the compilation of the Oral Torah into the Mishna. After the Bar Kokhba revolt and the destruction of the Second Temple in 70 CE, other movements (aside from Samaritanism) disappeared from the historical record. However, the Sadducees probably continued to exist in an unorganized form for at least several more decades.

== Non-Rabbinic Judaism ==
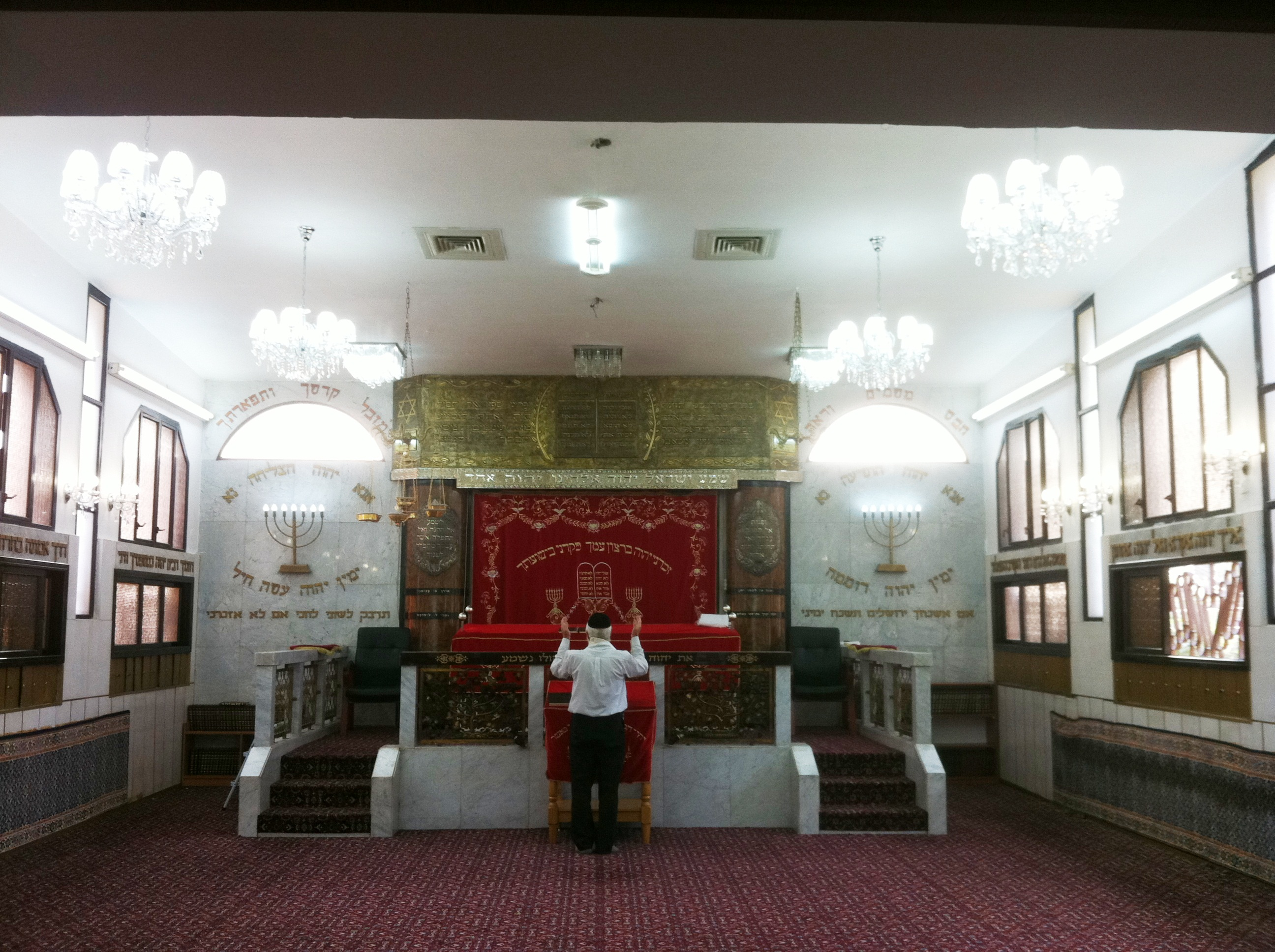
In central Karaite synagogue, Ramla

Non-Rabbinic Judaism, Sadducees, Nazarenes, Karaite Judaism, and Haymanot, contrasts with Rabbinic Judaism and does not recognize the Oral Torah as a divine authority nor the rabbinic procedures used to interpret Jewish scripture.

=== Karaite Judaism ===
The tradition of the Qara'im survives in Karaite Judaism, started in the early 9th century when non-rabbinic sages like Benjamin Nahawandi and their followers took the rejection of the Oral Torah by Anan ben David to the new level of seeking the plain meaning of the Tanakh's text. Karaite Jews accept only the Tanakh as divinely inspired, not recognizing the authority that Rabbinites ascribe to basic rabbinic works like the Talmud and the Midrashim.

=== Haymanot ===
Haymanot (meaning "religion" in Ge'ez and Amharic) refers to the Judaism practiced by Ethiopian Jews. This version of Judaism differs substantially from Rabbinic Judaism because it shares significant similarities with Karaite Judaism and Samaritanism. Sacred scriptures (the Orit) are written in Ge'ez, not Hebrew, However many words are ascribed in Hebrew. Dietary laws are based strictly on the text of the Orit, without explication from ancillary commentaries. Holidays also differ, with some Rabbinic holidays not observed in Ethiopian Jewish communities, and some additional holidays, like Sigd.

== Ethno-cultural divisions' movements ==
Although there are numerous Jewish ethnic communities, several of them are large enough to be considered predominant. Generally, they do not constitute separate religious branches within Judaism, instead, they constitute separate cultural traditions (nuschaot) and rites of prayer (minhagim). Ashkenazi Jews compose about 75% of the world's Jewish population. Sephardi Jews and Mizrahi Jews compose the greatest part of the rest, with about 20% of the world's Jewish population. Israel has two Chief Rabbi—one for the Ashkenazic, another for the Sephardic with Mizrahi Jews. The remaining 5% of Jews are divided among a wide array of small groups (such as various groups of African Jews, most prominently the Beta Israel from Ethiopia who follow the Haymanot branch of Judaism), some of which are nearing extinction as a result of assimilation and intermarriage into surrounding non-Jewish cultures or surrounding Jewish cultures. Additionally, special ethnoreligious divisions are also the Italian rite Jews and the Greek Romaniote Jews. Both groups are considered distinct from Ashkenazim and Sephardim.

The Enlightenment had a tremendous effect on Jewish identity as well as ideas about the importance and role of Jewish observance. Due to the geographical distribution and the geopolitical entities affected by the Enlightenment, this philosophical revolution essentially affected only the Ashkenazi community; however, because of the predominance of the Ashkenazi community in Israeli politics and in Jewish leadership worldwide, the effects have been significant for all Jews.

=== Sephardic and Mizrahi Judaism ===
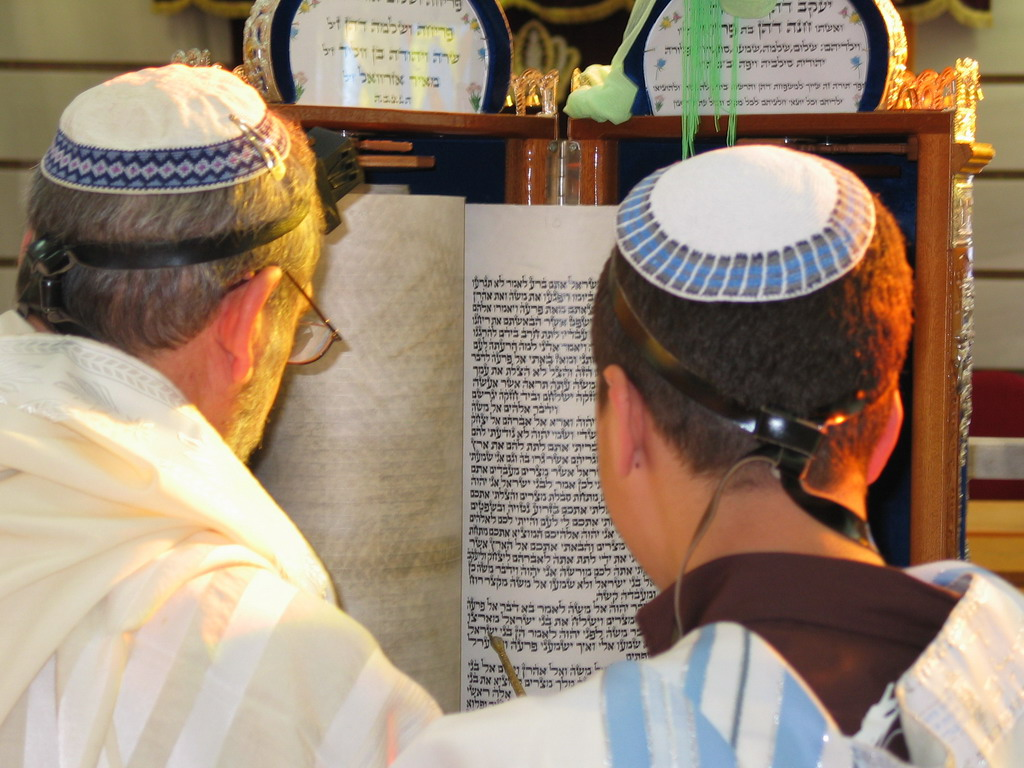
Torah reading Sephardic custom

Sephardic Judaism is the practice of Judaism as observed by the Sephardim (Iberian, Spanish-Portuguese Jews). The Mizrahi Jews (including Maghrebi) are all Oriental Jewry. Some definitions of "Sephardic" also include Mizrahi, many of whom follow the same traditions of worship but have different ethno-cultural traditions. So far as it is peculiar to themselves and not shared with other Jewish groups such as the Ashkenazim (German rite).

Sephardim are primarily the descendants of Jews from the Iberian Peninsula, such as most Jews from France and the Netherlands. They may be divided into the families that left in the Expulsion of 1492 and those that remained as crypto-Jews, Marranos and those who left in the following few centuries. In religious parlance, and by many in modern Israel, the term is used in a broader sense to include all Jews of Ottoman or other Asian or African backgrounds (Mizrahi Jews), whether or not they have any historic link to Spain, although some prefer to distinguish between Sephardim proper and Mizraḥi Jews.

Sephardic and Mizrachi Jewish synagogues are generally considered Orthodox or Sephardic Haredim by non-Sephardic Jews, and are primarily run according to the Orthodox tradition, even though many of the congregants may not keep a level of observance on par with traditional Orthodox belief. For example, many congregants will drive to the synagogue on the Shabbat, in violation of halakha, while discreetly entering the synagogue so as not to offend more observant congregants. However, not all Sephardim are Orthodox; among the pioneers of the Reform Judaism movement in the 1820s there was the Sephardic congregation Beth Elohim in Charleston, South Carolina. A part of the European Sephardim were also linked with the Judaic modernization.

Unlike the predominantly Ashkenazic Reform, and Reconstructionist denominations, Sephardic and Mizrahi Jews who are not observant generally believe that Orthodox Judaism's interpretation and legislation of halakha is appropriate, and true to the original philosophy of Judaism. That being said, Sephardic and Mizrachi rabbis tend to hold different, and generally more lenient, positions on halakha than their Ashkenazi counterparts, but since these positions are based on rulings of Talmudic scholars as well as well-documented traditions that can be linked back to well-known codifiers of Jewish law, Ashkenazic and Hasidic Rabbis do not believe that these positions are incorrect, but rather that they are the appropriate interpretation of halakha for Jews of Sephardic and Mizrachi descent.

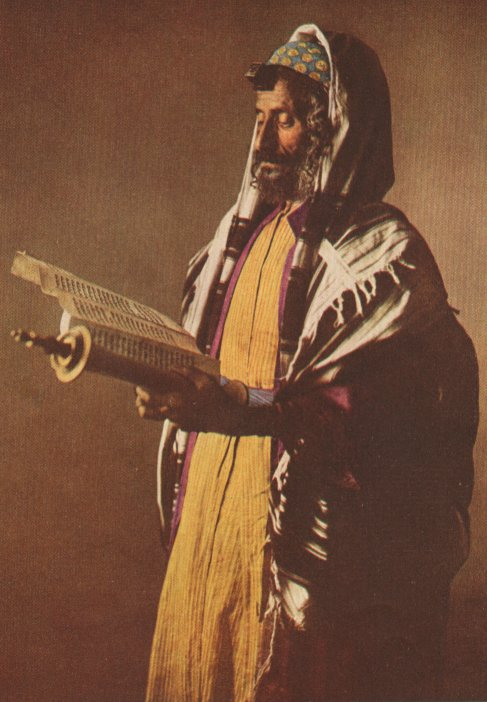
A Yemenite Jew in traditional vestments under the tallit gadol, reading from a Torah scroll

The Yemenite Jews—the Dor Daim and other movements—use a separate Baladi-rite. The Yemenite and the Aramaic speaking Kurdish Jews are the only communities who maintain the tradition of reading the Torah in the synagogue in both Hebrew and the Aramaic Targum ("translation"). Most non-Yemenite synagogues have a specified person called a Baal Koreh, who reads from the Torah scroll when congregants are called to the Torah scroll for an aliyah. In the Yemenite tradition, each person called to the Torah scroll for an aliyah reads for himself.

The Shas, a religious political party in Israel, represents the interests of the Orthodox/Haredi Sephardim and Mizrahim.

=== Italian and Romaniote Judaism ===
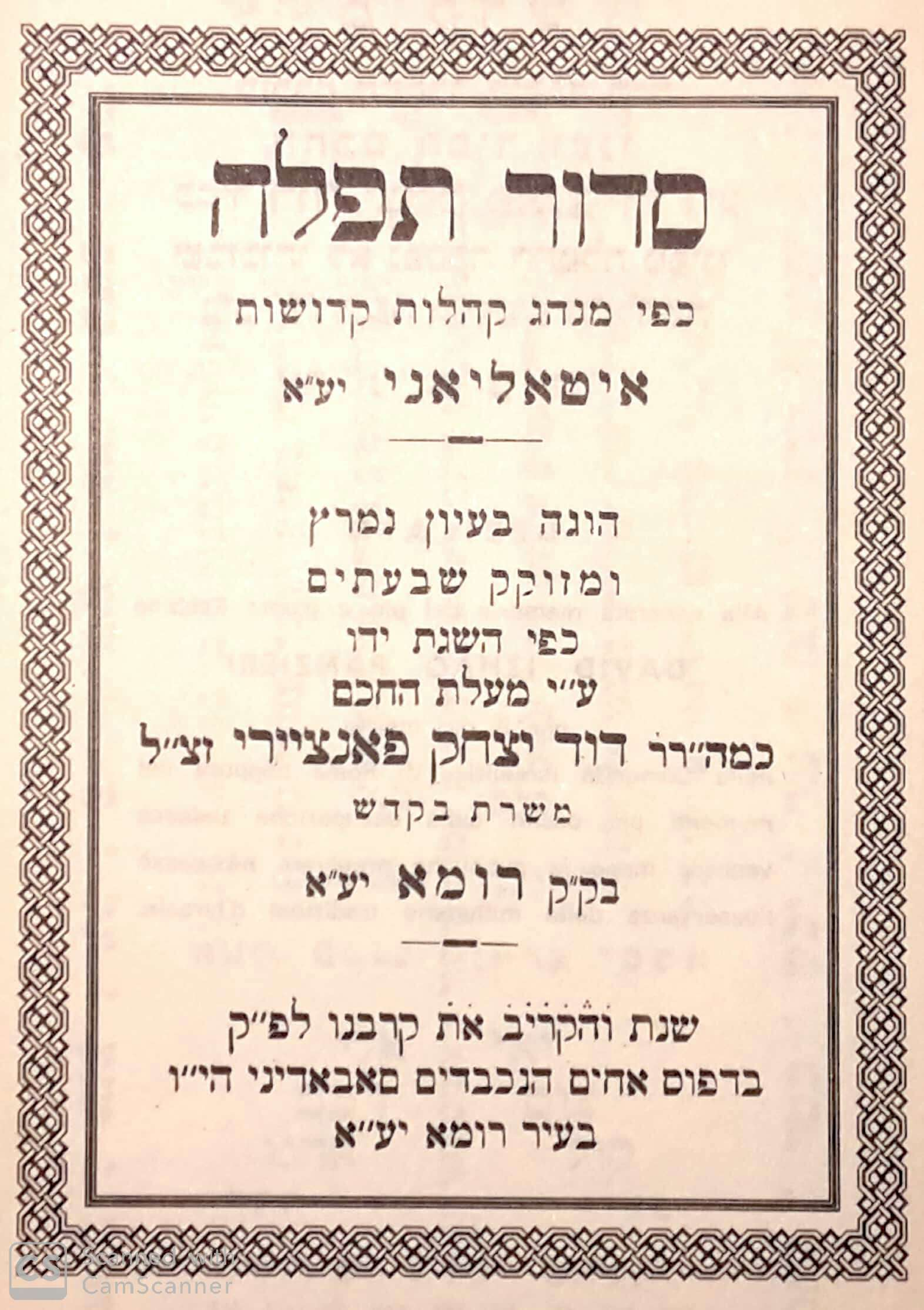
Italian siddur (סידור איטליני)

A relatively small but influential ethnoreligious group in the intellectual circles of Israel are Italian rite Jews (Italkim) who are neither Ashkenazi nor Sephardi. These are exclusively descendants of the ancient Roman Jewish community, not including later Ashkenazic and Sephardic migrants to Italy. They practice traditional Orthodox Judaism. The liturgy is served according to a special Italian Nusach (Nusach ʾItalqi, a.k.a. Minhag B'nei Romì) and it has similarities with the nusach of the Greek Romaniote Jews.

The Romaniote Jews or the Romaniotes (Romanyotim) native to the Eastern Mediterranean is the oldest Jewish community in Europe, whom name is refers to the Eastern Roman Empire. They are also distinct from the Ashkenazim and Sephardim. But, nowadays, few synagogues still use the Romaniote nusach and minhag.

=== Ashkenazic movements ===
==== Hasidic Judaism ====
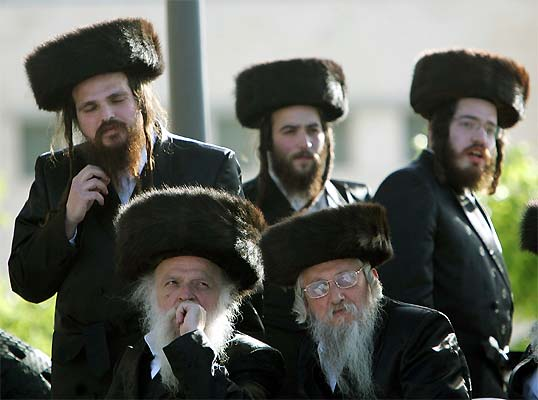
Hasidim

Hasidic Judaism—a revivalist movement—was founded by Israel ben Eliezer (1700–1760), also known as the Baal Shem Tov, whose followers had previously called themselves Freylechn ("happy ones") and now they call themselves Hasidim ("pious, holy ones"). His charismatic disciples attracted many followers among Ashkenazi Jews, and they also established numerous Hasidic groups across Europe. The Baal Shem Tov came at a time when the Jewish masses of Eastern Europe were reeling from the bewilderment and disappointment which were engendered in them by the two notorious Jewish false messiahs, Sabbatai Zevi (1626–1676) and Jacob Frank (1726–1791), and their respective followers. Hasidic Judaism eventually became the way of life for many Jews in Eastern Europe. The Hasidim are organized into independent "courts" or dynasties, each dynasty is headed by its own hereditary spiritual leader-rebbe. Unlike other Ashkenazim, most Hasidim use some variation of Nusach Sefard, a blend of Ashkenazi and Sephardi liturgies, based on the innovations of the Kabbalist Isaac Luria. Neo-Hasidism is a term which refers to trends of interest in the teachings of Kabbalah and Hasidism which are expressed by members of other existing Jewish movements.

==== Lithuanian (Lita'im) ====
In the late 18th century, there was a serious schism between Hasidic and non-Hasidic Jews. European traditionalist Jews who rejected the Hasidic movement were dubbed Mitnagdim ("opponents") by the followers of the Baal Shem Tov. Lithuania became the centre of this opposition under the leadership of Vilna Gaon (Elijah ben Solomon Zalman), which adopted the epithets Litvishe (Yiddish word), Litvaks (in Slavic) or Lita'im (in Hebrew) those epithets refer to Haredi Jews who are not Hasidim (and not Hardalim or Sephardic Haredim). Since then, all of the Hasidic Jewish groups have been theologically subsumed into mainstream Orthodox Judaism, particularly, Haredi Judaism, but cultural differences persist. In the 19th century, the Lithuanian spirituality was mainly incorporated into the Musar movement.

==== Post-Enlightenment movements ====
Late-18th-century Europe, and then the rest of the world, was swept by a group of intellectual, social and political movements that taken together were referred to as the Enlightenment. These movements promoted scientific thinking, free thought, and allowed people to question previously unshaken religious dogmas. The emancipation of the Jews in many European communities, and the Haskalah movement started by Moses Mendelssohn, brought the Enlightenment to the Jewish community.

In response to the challenges of integrating Jewish life with Enlightenment values, German Jews in the early 19th century began to develop the concept of Reform Judaism, adapting Jewish practice to the new conditions of an increasingly urbanized and secular community. Staunch opponents of the Reform movement became known as Orthodox Jews. Later, members of the Reform movement who felt that it was moving away from tradition too quickly formed the Conservative movement.

At the same time, the notion "traditional Judaism" includes the Orthodox with Conservative or solely the Orthodox Jews or exclusively pre-Hasidic pre-modern forms of Orthodoxy.

Over time, three main movements emerged (Orthodox, Reform and Conservative Judaism).

===== Orthodoxy =====
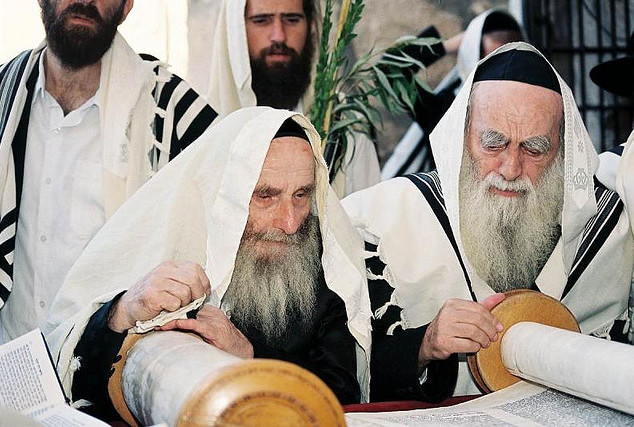
Orthodox men during morning Torah reading at the Western Wall

Orthodox Jews generally see themselves as practicing normative Judaism, rather than belonging to a particular movement. Within Orthodox Judaism, there is a spectrum of communities and practices, ranging from ultra-Orthodox Haredi Judaism and Jewish fundamentalism to Modern Orthodox Judaism (with Neo-Orthodoxy, Open Orthodoxy, and Religious Zionism). Orthodox Jews who opposed the Haskalah became known as Haredi Jews (Haredim), including Hardalim, Hasidim, Misnagdim (Lita'im), and Sephardim Haredim. Orthodox Jews who were sympathetic to the Haskalah formed what became known as modern/neo-Orthodox Jews. The German rabbi Azriel Hildesheimer is regarded as a Modern Orthodoxy founder, while the father of neo-Orthodoxy was German rabbi Samson Raphael Hirsch, who proclaimed the principle Torah im Derech Eretz— the strict observance of the Jewish Law in an active social life. In 1851, he become the rabbi of the first Orthodox group that separated from the Reform community of Frankfurt am Main. In addition, the "Centrist" Orthodoxy was represented by American rabbi Joseph B. Soloveitchik affiliated with the Orthodox Union.

In Israel, Orthodox Judaism occupies a privileged position: solely an Orthodox rabbi may become the Chief rabbi and Chief military rabbi; and only Orthodox synagogues have the right to conduct Jewish marriages.

===== Reform =====
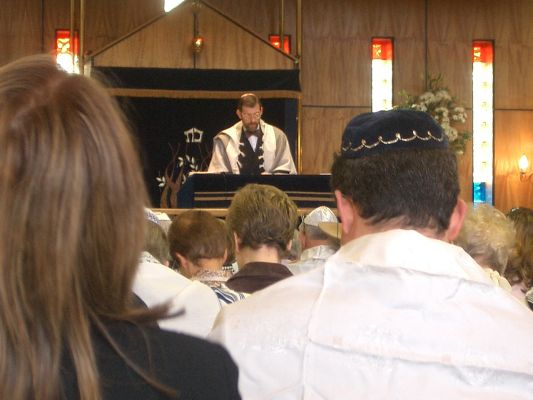
Reform Jewish service with mixed sitting

Reform Judaism, also known as Liberal (referring to the British branch) or Progressive Judaism, originally began in Germany, the Netherlands and the United States c. 1820 as a reaction to modernity. It stresses assimilation and integration with society and a personal interpretation of the Torah. The German rabbi and scholar Abraham Geiger became the main ideologist of the "Classical" Reform. He advocated for Judaism as a religion and not ethnicity, progressive revelation, the historical-critical approach, the centrality of the Prophetic books, and superiority of ethical aspects of Judaism to the ceremonial ones. Unlike traditional Judaism, Reform rejects the concept of the Jews as the chosen people. There are transformations from the purism of "Classical" European to the "New Reform" in America which reincorporates some traditional Jewish elements.

In the United States, at the turn of the 20th and 21st centuries, the Reform movement became the largest, ahead of Conservative Judaism. In contrast, Reform in Israel is relatively smaller.

===== Conservative (Masorti) =====
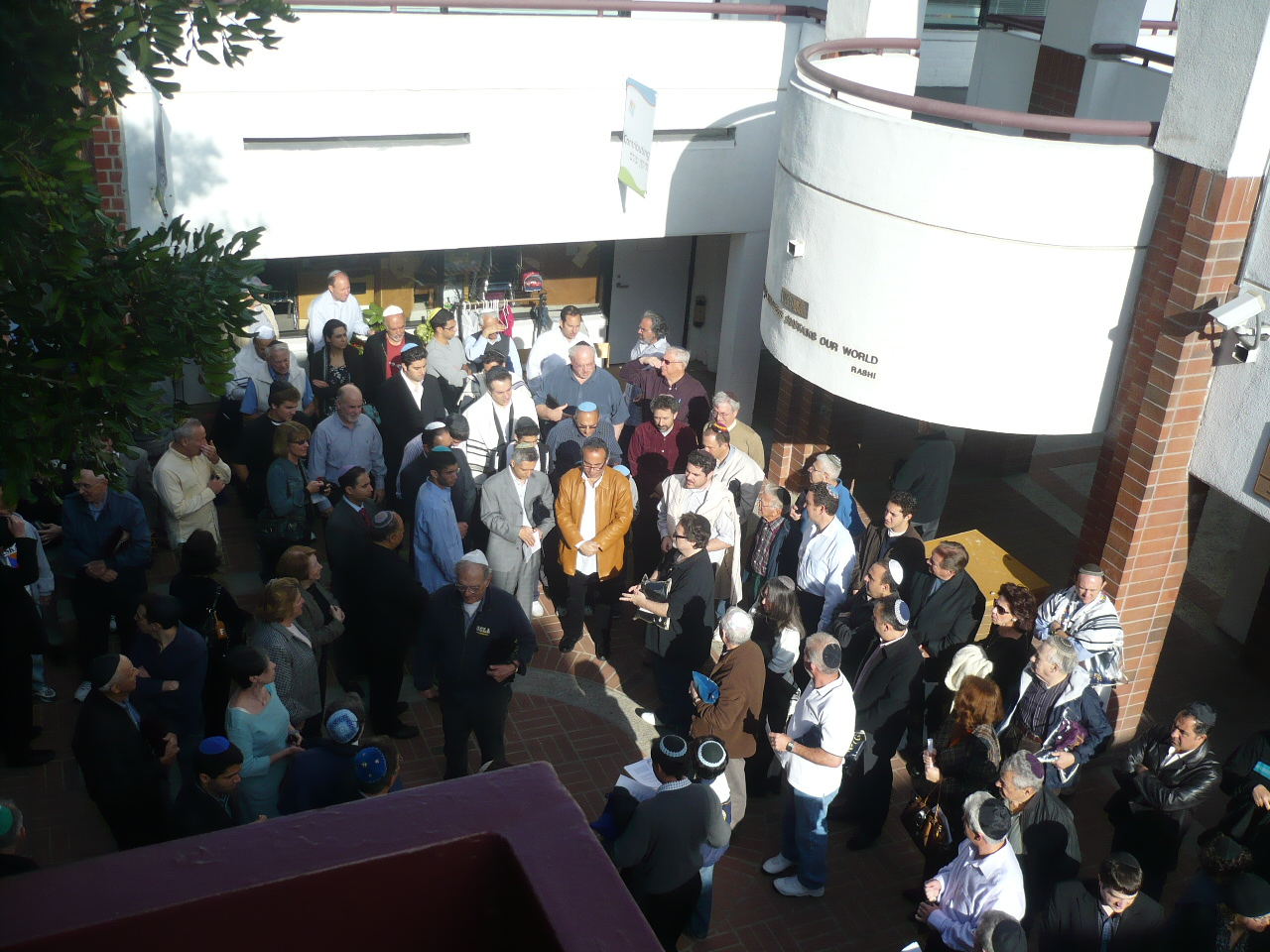
Birkat Hachama of Conservative Jews, Encino, Los Angeles

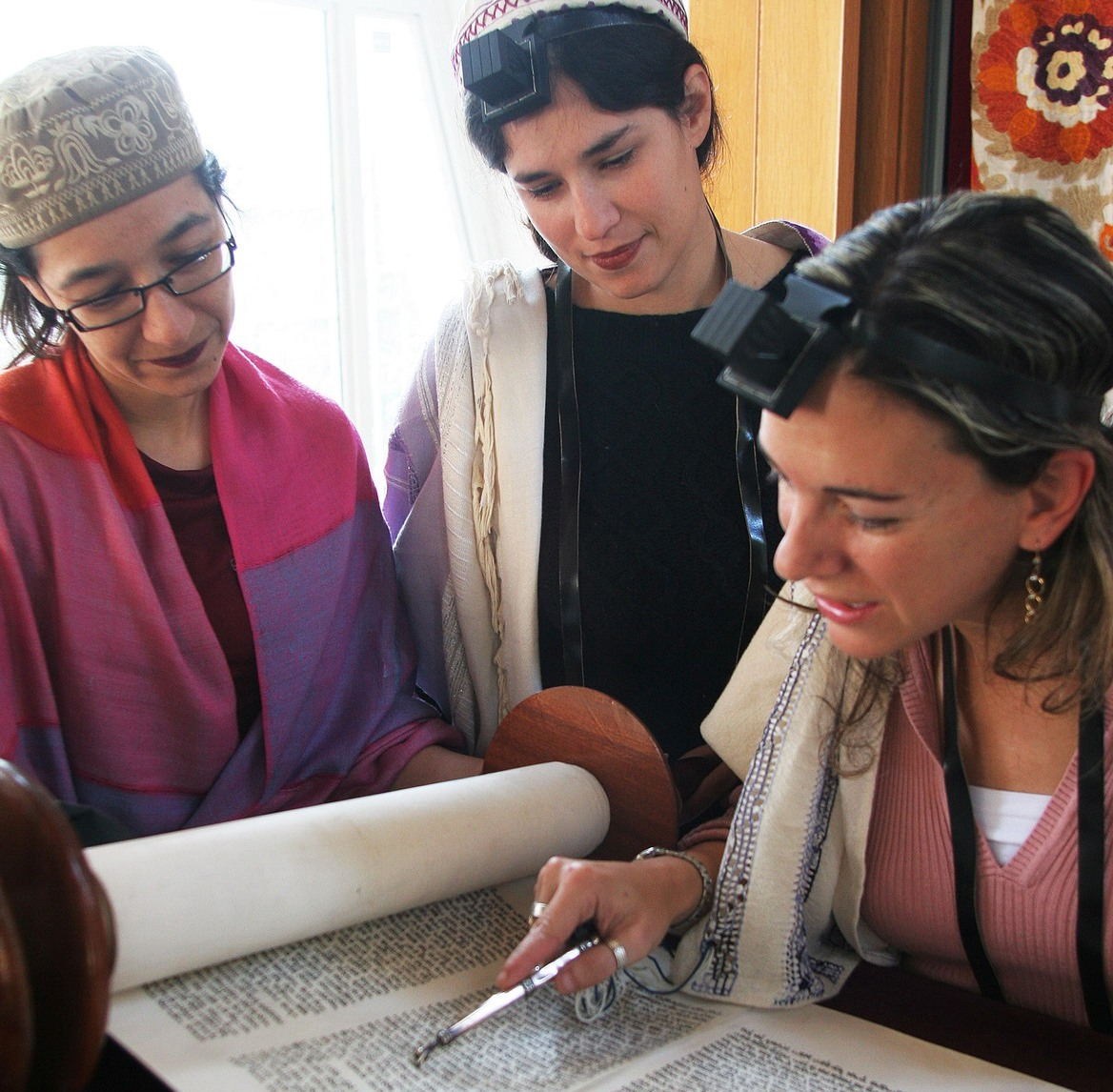
Conservative women rabbis, Israel

Conservative or Masorti Judaism, originated in Germany in the 19th century on the ideological foundation of the Historical School studies, but became institutionalized in the United States, where it had been the largest Jewish movement until 1990. After the division between Reform and Orthodox Judaism, the Conservative movement tried to provide Jews seeking liberalization of Orthodox theology and practice, such as female rabbi ordination, with a more traditional and halakhically-based alternative to Reform Judaism. It has spread to Ashkenazi communities in Anglophone countries and Israel.

Neolog Judaism, a movement in the Kingdom of Hungary and in its territories ceded in 1920, is similar than the more traditional American branch.

===== Communal Judaism (Ḥevrati) =====
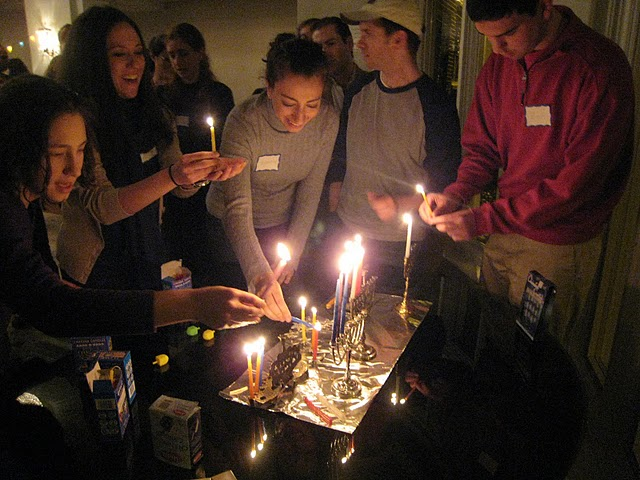
Members of the DC Minyan light candles in celebration of the Festival of Hanukkah.

Communal Judaism, also referred to as יהדות חברתי (Yahadut Ḥevrati) in Hebrew, is a denomination that intertwines the ethnoreligious identity and indigenous tradition within the broader Jewish community. Unlike other movements which may emphasize theological nuances, Communal Judaism places a substantial focus on the social and communal aspects of Jewish life, alongside personal spiritual practices.

Practitioners are diverse, found globally with significant numbers in Israel and the United States, extending to European and Middle Eastern countries. This spread is reflective of the movement's inclusive approach to Jewish identity, welcoming those who align with its core values of maintaining communal traditions and customs without the stringent adherence to rabbinical interpretations that some other denominations might require.

In terms of religious observance, adherents commonly engage in the lighting of Shabbat candles, recitation of Kiddush, and the enjoyment of communal meals replete with traditional zemirot. This practice is designed to foster a sense of community and spiritual reflection, particularly on Shabbat where the use of technology is often set aside to maintain a contemplative state.

Dietary laws within Communal Judaism adhere to kashrut, the set of Jewish dietary laws, with a focus on traditional observance. This includes abstaining from pork and shellfish and not mixing meat with dairy products, as outlined in the Torah.

The connection to the Land of Israel stands as a central tenet of Communal Judaism, emphasizing a deep ethnic heritage and historical relationship with the land. This connection is celebrated and remembered through the observance of holidays and commemorations that reflect on the Jewish people's historical experiences of dispersal and return.

Spiritually, Communal Judaism advocates for the integration of tradition into daily life, upholding a heart-centered approach to religious practice. While individual prayer is encouraged, the emphasis is placed on communal worship and support, reflecting the movement's overarching commitment to a life lived in close connection with one's community and heritage.

==== Migration ====
The particular forms of Judaism which are practiced by the different Jewish denominations have been shaped by the immigration of the Ashkenazi Jewish communities, once concentrated in eastern and central Europe, to western and mostly Anglophone countries (in particular, in North America). In the middle of the 20th century, the institutional division of North American Jewry between Reform, Conservative, and Orthodox movements still reflected immigrant origins. Reform Jews at that time were predominantly of German or western European origin, while both Conservative and Orthodox Judaism came primarily from eastern European countries.

==== Zionists (Datim-leumi) and anti-Zionists ====
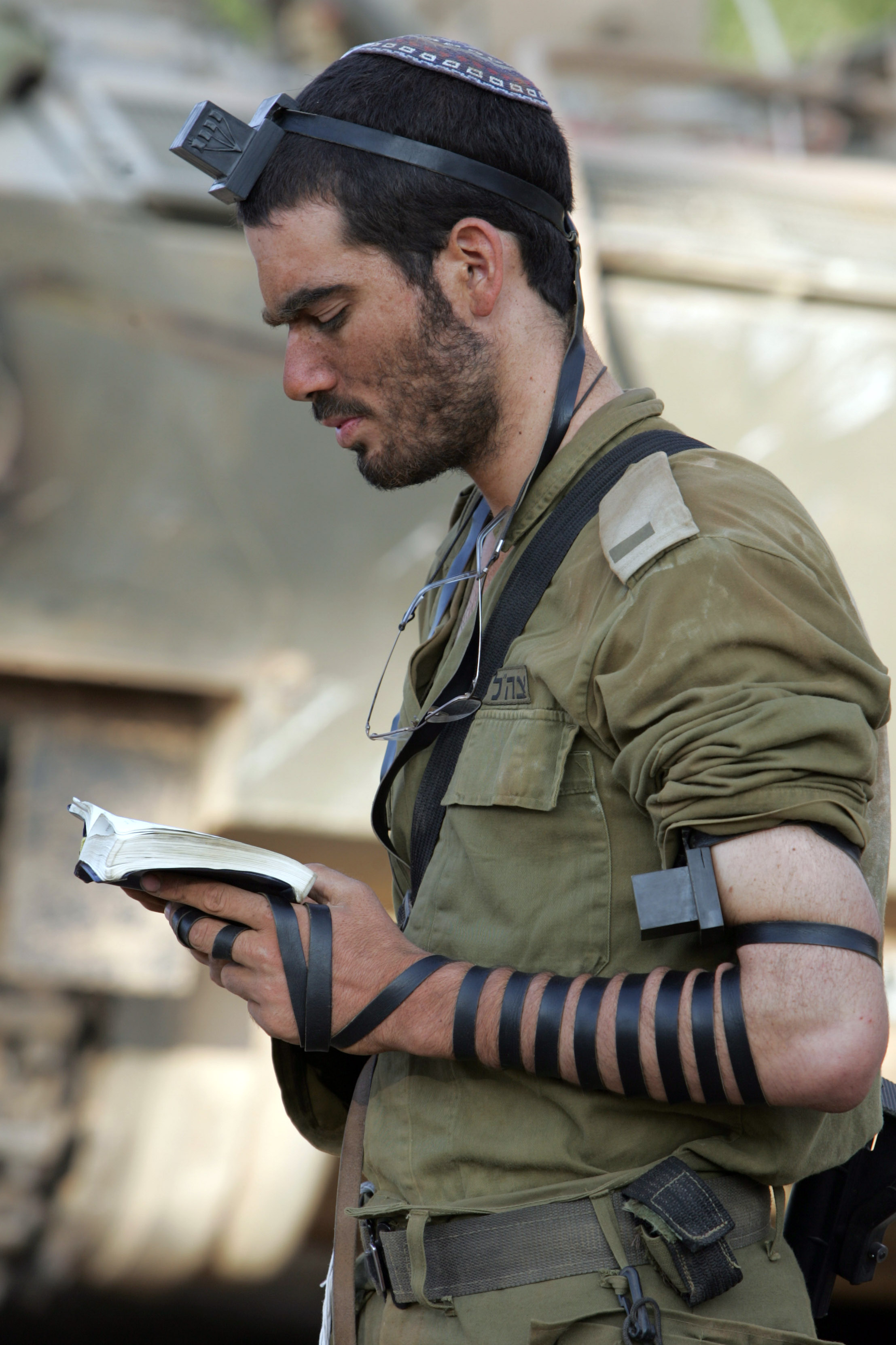
IDF soldier, Asael Lubotzky prays with tefillin

The issue of Zionism was once very divisive in the Jewish community. Religious Zionism, a.k.a. "Nationalist Orthodoxy" (Dati-leumi) combines Zionism and Orthodox Judaism, based on the teachings of rabbis Zvi Hirsch Kalischer and Abraham Isaac Kook. The name Hardalim or Haredi-leumi ("Nationalist Haredim") refers to the Haredi-oriented variety of Religious Zionism. Another mode is Reform Zionism as Zionist arm of Reform Judaism.

Non-Orthodox Conservative leaders joined Zionist mission. Reconstructionist Judaism also supports Zionism and "the modern state of Israel plays a central role in its ideology."

Religious Zionists (datim) have embraced the Zionist movement, including Religious Kibbutz Movement, as part of the divine plan to bring or speed up the messianic era.

Before the creation of the State of Israel or the Holocaust, Zionism was rejected by most ultra-Orthodox and Reform Jews. Ultra-Orthodox Jewish non-Zionists believed that the return to Israel could only happen with the coming of the Messiah, and that a political attempt to re-establish a Jewish state through human means alone was contrary to God's plan. Non-Zionists believed that Jews should integrate into the countries in which they lived, rather than moving to the Land of Israel. The original founders of Reform Judaism in Germany rejected traditional prayers for the restoration of Jerusalem. The view among Reform Jews that Judaism was strictly a religion rather than a nation with cultural identity, and that Jews should be assimilated, loyal citizens of their host nations, led to a non-Zionist, and sometimes anti-Zionist, stance. After events of the 20th century, most importantly the Holocaust and the establishment of the modern State of Israel, opposition to Zionism largely disappeared within Reform Judaism.

Among most religious non-Zionists, such as Chabad, there is a de facto recognition of Israel, but only as a secular non-religious state.

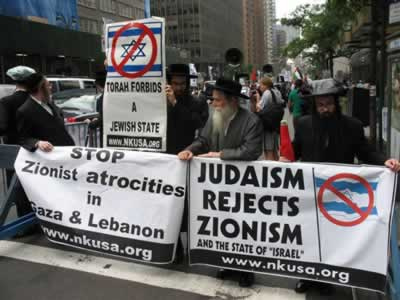
Naturei Karta protest, USA

A few of the fringe groups of the anti-Zionists, with marginal ideology, does not recognize the legitimacy of the Israeli state. Among them are both the Orthodox (the Satmar Hasidism, Edah HaChareidis, Neturei Karta) and Reform (American Council for Judaism).

In addition, according to some contemporary scholars, Religious Zionism stands at least outside of Rabbinic Judaism or ever shoots off Judaism as such.

==== Pressures of assimilation ====
Among the most striking differences between the Jewish movements in the 21st century is their response to pressures of assimilation, such as intermarriage between Jews and non-Jews. Reform and Reconstructionist rabbis have been most accepting of intermarried couples, with some rabbis willing to officiate in mixed religious ceremonies, although most insist that children in such families be raised strictly Jewish. Conservative rabbis are not permitted to officiate in such marriages, but are supportive of couples when the non-Jewish partner wishes to convert to Judaism and raise children as Jewish.

=== Crypto-Judaism ===
Crypto-Judaism is the secret adherence to Judaism by people who publicly profess another faith; practitioners of Crypto-Judaism are referred to as "crypto-Jews" (origin from Greek kryptos – κρυπτός, 'hidden'). Nowadays, in whole, Crypto-Judaism movements are a historical phenomenon.

In the United States, Reform rabbi Jacques Cukierkorn is one of the leaders of the outreach to the descendants of those Crypto-Jews who wish to renew their ties with the Jewish people.

The subgroups of Crypto-Jews are as follows:

- Anusim
  - Sephardic Bnei Anusim
    - Converso
    - Marrano
    - Xueta
- Beta Abraham
- Chala (Jews)
- Sabbateanism
- Frankism
- Dönmeh
- Kaifeng Jews
- Mashhadi Jews
- Neofiti

=== Other ethnic movements ===
==== Beta Israel (Haymanot) ====
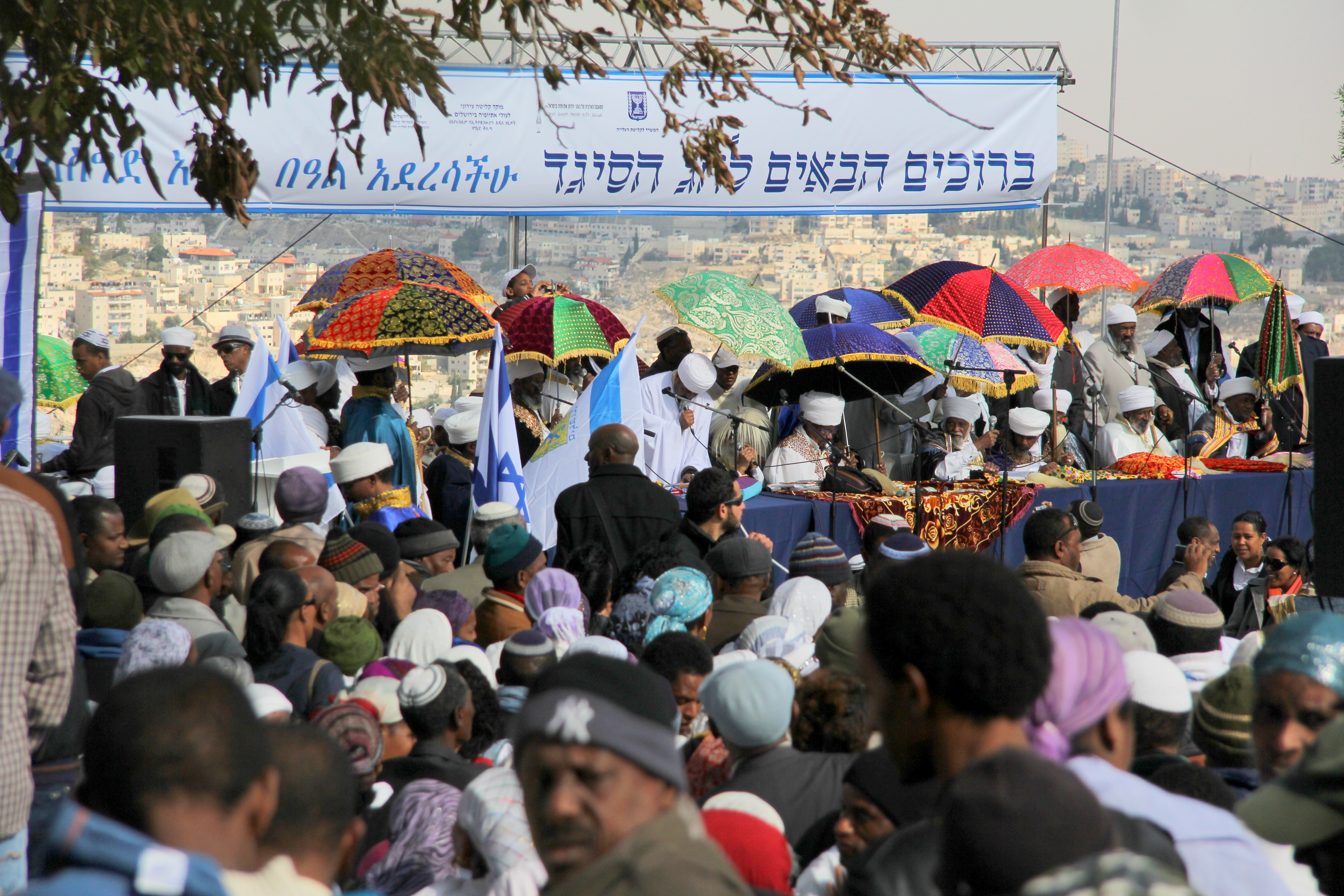
Beta Israel celebrating Sigd, Jerusalem

The Beta Israel (House of Israel), also known as Ethiopian Jews, are a Jewish community that developed in Ethiopia and lived there for centuries. Most of the Beta Israel emigrated to Israel in the late 20th century. They practiced Haymanot, a religion which is generally recognized as a non-Rabbinic form of Judaism (in Israel, they practice a mixture of Haymanot and Rabbinic Judaism). To the Beta Israel, the holiest book is the Orit (a word which means the "law"), and it consists of the Torah and the Books of Joshua, Judges and Ruth. Until the middle of the 20th century, the Beta Israel of Ethiopia were the only modern Jewish group which practiced a monastic tradition which the monks adhered to by living in monasteries which were separated from the Jewish villages.

==== Crimean Karaites ====
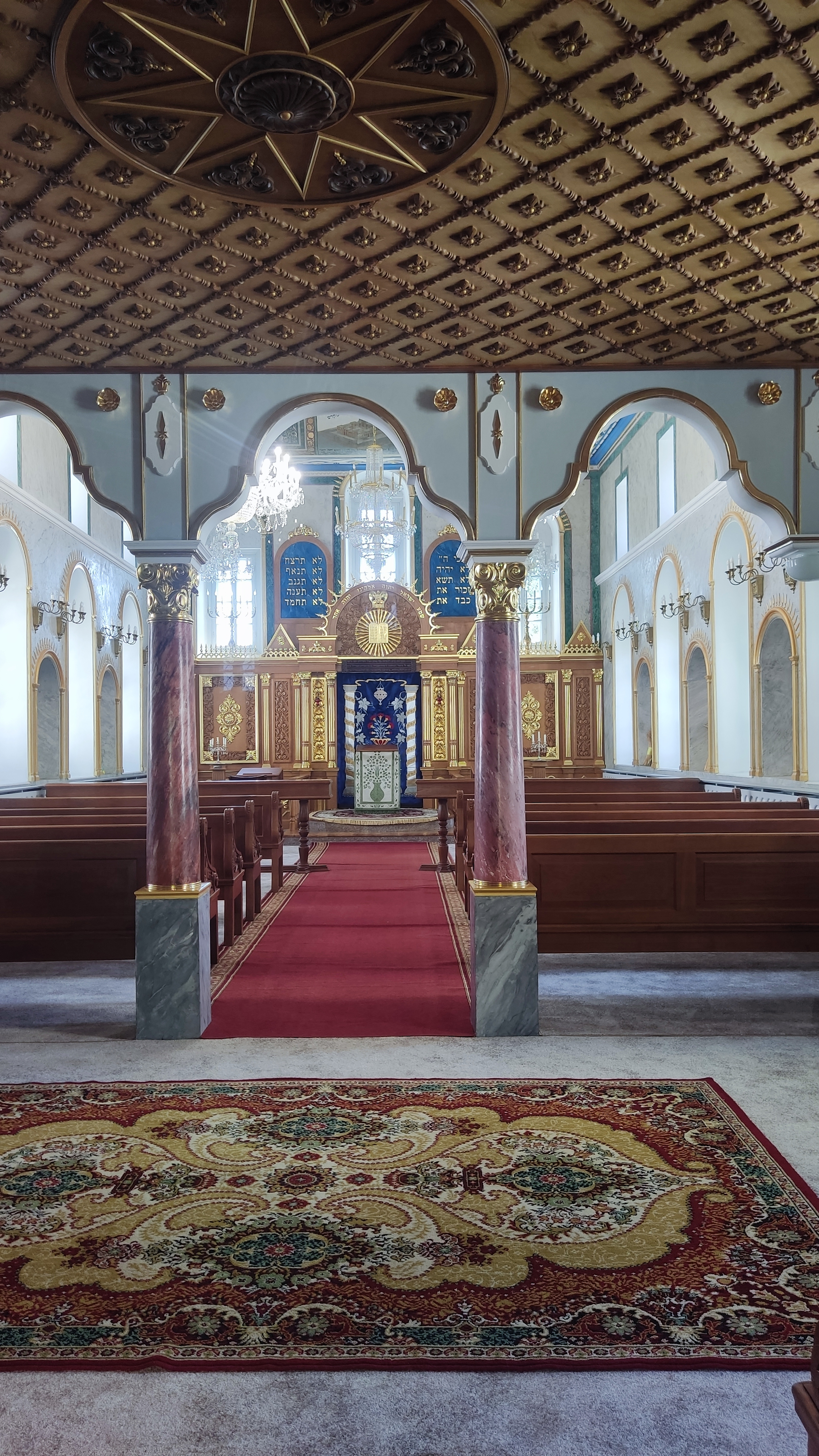
Great Eupatorian Kenassa interior

The Crimean Karaites (a.k.a. Karaims) are an ethnicity which is derived from Turkic Karaim-speaking adherents of Karaite Judaism in Eastern Europe, especially in Crimea. They were probably Jewish by origin, but due to political pressure and other reasons, many of them began to claim that they were Turks, descendants of the Khazars. During the era when Crimea was a part of the Russian Empire, the Crimean Karaite leaders persuaded the Russian rulers to exempt Karaites from the anti-Semitic regulations which were imposed upon Jews. These Karaites were recognized as non-Jews during the Nazi occupation. Some of them even served in the SS. The ideology of de-Judaization and the revival of Tengrism were imbued with the works of the contemporary leaders of the Karaites in Crimea. While the members of several Karaite congregations were registered as Turks, some of them retained Jewish customs. In the 1990s, many Karaites emigrated to Israel, under the Law of Return. The largest Karaite community has since then resided in Israel.

==== Igbo Jews ====
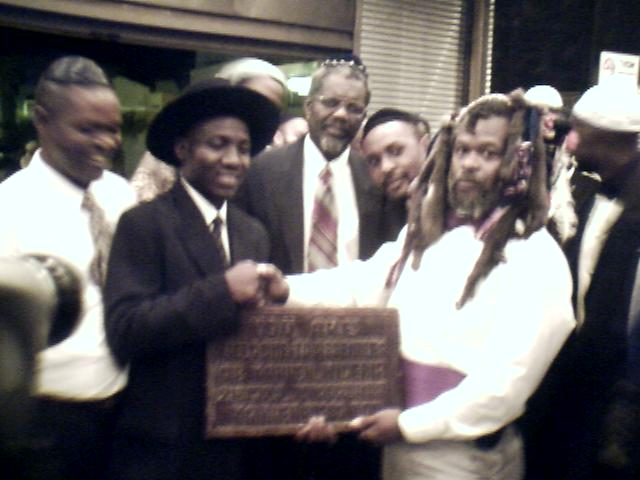
Igbo Jews, Nigeria, presented with a plaque

Igbo people of Nigeria who practice a form of Judaism are referred to as Igbo Jews. Judaism has been documented in parts of Nigeria since the precolonial period, from as early as the 1500s, but is not known to have been practiced in the Igbo region in precolonial times. Nowadays, up to 30,000 Igbos are practicing some form of Judaism.

==== Subbotniks ====
The Subbotniks are a movement of Jews of Russian ethnic origin which split off from other Sabbatarian movements in the late 18th century. The majority of the Subbotniks practiced Rabbinic and Karaite Judaism, a minority of them practiced Spiritual Christianity. Subbotnik families settled in the Holy Land which was then a part of the Ottoman Empire, in the 1880s, as part of the Zionist First Aliyah in order to escape from antisemitic oppression in the Russian Empire and later, most of them married other Jews. Their descendants included Israeli Jews such as Alexander Zaïd, Major-General Alik Ron, and the mother of Ariel Sharon.

== 20th/21st-century movements ==
=== 20th-century movements ===
Additionally, a number of smaller groups have emerged:

Black Judaism

A type of Judaism that is predominantly practiced in African communities, both inside and outside Africa (such as North America). It is sometimes theologically characterized by the selective acceptance of the Judaic faith (in some cases, such selective acceptance has historical circumstances), and the belief system of Black Judaism is significantly different from the belief system of the mainstream movements of Judaism. In addition, although Black Judaic communities adopt Judaic practices such as the celebration of Jewish holidays and the recital of Jewish prayers, some of them are generally not considered legitimate Jews by mainstream Jewish societies.

Rather than practicing a divergent type of Judaism, the Abayudaya community in eastern Uganda and in Israel is devout in its practice of western halakha, especially because it is led by the Reform and Conservative movements, which most Abayudaya community members in Uganda are affiliated with. Gershom Sizomu, the spiritual leader of the Abayudaya and Rosh Yeshiva, the first native-born black rabbi in sub-Saharan Africa, also the first chief rabbi of Uganda, and since 2016 a Member of Uganda Parliament, is a graduate of the American Jewish University in Los Angeles, California receiving ordination under the auspices of the Conservative movement in 2008. In June 2016, Rabbi Shlomo Riskin led a Beit Din that performed an Orthodox conversion for the Putti community in Uganda.

Jewish Science

Formed in the early 20th century by Alfred G. Moses and Morris Lichtenstein, Jewish Science was founded as a counterweight Jewish movement to Christian Science. Jewish Science sees God as a force or energy penetrating the reality of the Universe and emphasis is placed upon the role of affirmative prayer in personal healing and spiritual growth. The Society of Jewish Science in New York is the institutional arm of the movement regularly publishing The Interpreter, the movement's primary literary publication.

Reconstructionist Judaism

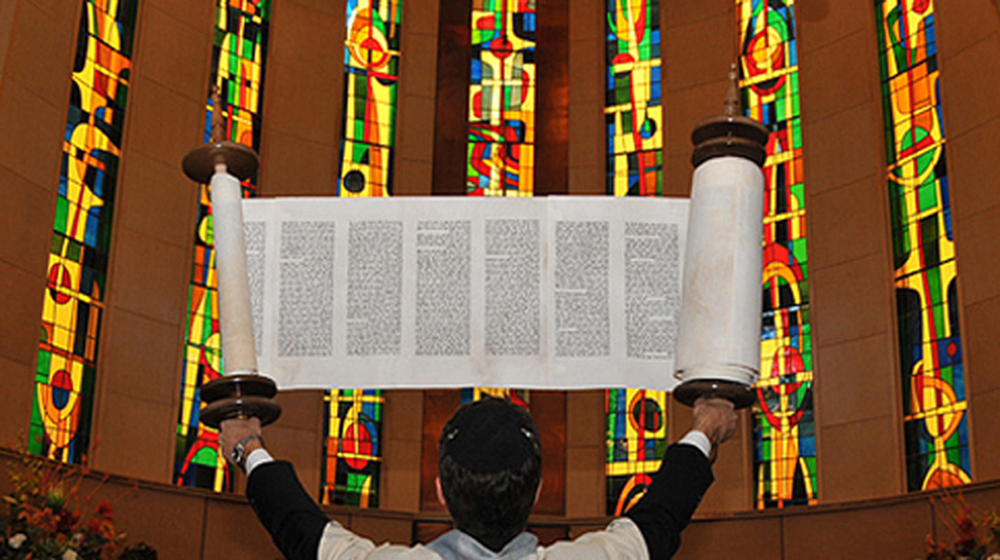
Torah reading at the Reconstructionist synagogue, Montreal

Founded by rabbi Mordecai Kaplan, the 1922 American split from Conservative Judaism that views Judaism as a progressively evolving civilization with a focus on the advancement of the Jewish community. The central organization is "Reconstructing Judaism". Assessments of its impact range from being recognized as the 4th major stream of Judaism to described as a smaller movement. As noted, Reconstructionism is a smaller movement, but its ideas significantly impacted Jewish life in the America.

Humanistic Judaism

A nontheistic worldwide movement that emphasizes Jewish culture and history as the sources of Jewish identity. Originated in Detroit in 1963 with the founding figure, Reform rabbi Sherwin Wine, in 1969 was established the Society for Humanistic Judaism.

Carlebach movement

The neo-Hasidic movement inspired by the counterculture of the 1960s and founded in the late 1960s in San Francisco (where the House of Love and Prayer was opened), then it was opened in Israel, by a musician, Lubavich's Hasidic rabbi Shlomo Carlebach for the purpose of returning secular youth to the bosom of Orthodox Judaism. The movement has no organizational agenda and it promotes Carlebach minyan, a song-filled form of Jewish worship.

Jewish Renewal

Partly syncretistic movement founded in the mid-1970s by ex-Lubavich's Hasidic rabbi Zalman Schachter-Shalomi and rooted in the counterculture of the 1960s and the Havurat Shalom group. P'nai Or (Faces of Light) in Philadelphia—the first Renewal community—later was established the umbrella organisation "ALEPH: the Alliance for Jewish Renewal". Its syncretism includes Kabbalah, neo-Hasidism, Reconstructionist Judaism, Western Buddhist meditation, Sufism, New Age, feminism, liberalism, and so on, tends to embrace the ecstatic worship style. Renewal congregations tend to be inclusive on the subject of who is a Jew and had avoided affiliation with any Jewish communities.

Conservadox

The term is occasionally applied to describe either individuals or new congregations, especially congregations which were established in the US in 1984 by rabbi David Weiss Halivni, such as the Union for Traditional Judaism, located between the Conservative and Modern Orthodox. While most scholars consider "Union for Traditional Judaism" (formerly Union for Traditional Conservative Judaism) as a new movement, some attribute it to the right wing of Conservative Judaism.

Kabbalah Centre

A "New Age Judaism" worldwide organisation established in 1984 by American rabbi Philip Berg, that popularizes Jewish mysticism among a universal audience.

Lev Tahor

A Haredi sect formed in the 1980s by Israeli-Canadian rabbi Shlomo Helbrans, follows a strict version of halakha, including its own unique practices such as lengthy prayer sessions, arranged marriages between teenagers, and head-to-toe coverings for females.

Open Orthodoxy

A movement founded by Avi Weiss in the late 1990s in US, with its own schools for religious ordination, both for men (Yeshivat Chovevei Torah) and women (Yeshivat Maharat). The movement declarates liberal, or inclusive Orthodoxy with women's ordination, full accepting LGBT members, and reducing stringent rules for conversion.

Haredi burqa sect

A controversial ultra-Orthodox group with a Jewish burqa-style covering of a woman's entire body, including a veil covering the face. Also known as the "Taliban Women" and the "Taliban Mothers" (נשות הטאליבן).

Remark: Baal teshuva movement—a description of the return of secular Jews to religious Judaism and involved with all the Jewish movements.

=== Trans- and post-denominational Judaism ===
Already in the 1980s, 20–30 percent of members of the largest American Jewish communities, such as of New York City or Miami, rejected a denominational label. And "Israeli Democracy Index" commissioned in 2013 by the Israel Democracy Institute found that the two thirds of respondents said they felt no connection to any denomination, or declined to respond.

The very idea of Jewish denominationalism is contested by some Jews and Jewish non-denominational organisations, which consider themselves to be "trans-denominational" or "post-denominational". The term "trans-denominational" also applied to describe new movements located on the religious continuum between some major streams, as an instance, Conservadox (Union for Traditional Judaism).

A variety of new Jewish organisations are emerging that lack such affiliations:

- Havurah movement is the number of small egalitarian experimental spiritual groups (first in 1960 in California) for prayer as autonomous alternatives to Jewish movements. Most notable of them is the Havurat Shalom in Somerville, Massachusetts;
- Independent minyan movement is a lay-led Jewish worship and study community that has developed independently of established denominational and synagogue structures and combines halakha with egalitarianism;
- International Federation of Rabbis (IFR), a non-denominational rabbinical organization for rabbis of all movements and backgrounds;
- Some Jewish day schools lack affiliation with any one movement;
- Keshet, a group that advocates for LGBTQ+ equality and for Jews of color within all Jewish life;
- There are several seminaries which are not controlled by a denomination (see List of rabbinical schools § Non-denominational and Rabbi § Seminaries unaffiliated with main denominations):
  - Academy for Jewish Religion (California) (AJRCA) is a transdenominational seminary based in Los Angeles, California. It draws faculty and leadership from all denominations of Judaism. It has programs for rabbis, cantors, chaplains, community leadership and Clinical Pastoral Education (CPE);
  - Academy for Jewish Religion (New York) (AJR) is a transdenominational seminary in Yonkers, NY, that trains rabbis and cantors and also offers Master's Program in Jewish Studies;
  - Hebrew College, a seminary in Newton Centre, Massachusetts, near Boston;
  - Hebrew Seminary in Skokie, Illinois
  - Other smaller, less traditional institutions include:
    - Rabbinical Seminary International, Jewish Spiritual Leaders Institute, Pluralistic Rabbinical Seminary, Rimmon Rabbinical School
    - Mesifta Adath Wolkowisk aimed at community professionals with significant knowledge and experience.

Organizations such as these believe that the formal divisions that have arisen among the "denominations" in contemporary Jewish history are unnecessarily divisive, as well as religiously and intellectually simplistic. According to Rachel Rosenthal, "the post-denominational Jew refuses to be labeled or categorized in a religion that thrives on stereotypes. He has seen what the institutional branches of Judaism have to offer and believes that a better Judaism can be created." Such Jews might, out of necessity, affiliate with a synagogue associated with a particular movement, but their own personal Jewish ideology is often shaped by a variety of influences from more than one denomination.

=== Bnei Noah ===
Noahidism, Noahides, or Bnei Noah (Hebrew: בני נח, "Sons of Noah") is a new religious movement which is based upon the Seven Laws of Noah. Historically, the Hebrew term Bnei Noah has been applied to all non-Jews because Jews believe that they are the descendants of Noah. Nowadays, however, it is specifically used to refer to those "Righteous Gentiles" who observe the Seven Laws of Noah. According to Jewish law, non-Jews (Gentiles) are not obligated to convert to Judaism, but they are required to observe the Seven Laws of Noah in order to be assured that they will have a place in the World to Come (Olam Ha-Ba), the final reward of the righteous. The modern Noahide movement was founded in the 1990s by Orthodox rabbis from Israel (mainly tied Hasidic and Zionist).

== List of contemporary movements ==
Rabbinic Judaism

- Orthodox Judaism
  - Haredi Judaism (ultra-Orthodox)
    - Hasidic Judaism
      - Hasidic dynasties
        - Belz
        - Bobov
        - Breslov
          - Na Nach
        - Chabad-Lubavitch
        - Ger
        - Karlin-Stolin
        - Sanz-Klausenburg
        - Satmar
        - Shomer Emunim
          - Toldos Aharon
        - Skver
        - Vizhnitz
        - Other dynasties
    - Misnagdim (Lita'im, Lithuanian)
      - Musar movement
    - Sephardic Haredim
    - Dor Daim
    - Other Haredim
      - Edah HaChareidis
      - Haredi burqa sect
      - Lev Tahor
      - Neturei Karta
  - Religious Zionism
  - Modern Orthodox Judaism
    - Carlebach movement
    - Open Orthodoxy
- Union for Traditional Judaism
  - Conservadox
- Conservative Judaism (Masorti)
- Reform Judaism
- Humanistic Judaism
- Jewish Renewal
- Reconstructionist Judaism

Non-Rabbinic Judaism

- Karaite Judaism
- Haymanot

Other Yahwist Religions

- Samaritanism

== See also ==
- Groups claiming affiliation with Israelites
- Jewish culture
- Jewish fundamentalism
- Jewish schisms
- Jewish views on religious pluralism
- List of religious organizations#Jewish organizations
- Religious Jews
- Who is a Jew?
