= Institute of Traditional Judaism =

Rabbinical school in New Jersey, US

- Teaneck, New Jersey; US

Information
- Type: Private
- Religious affiliation: Jewish
- Established: 1990
- Reish Metivta: Rabbi David Halivni

The Institute of Traditional Judaism, also known as The Metivta or the ITJ, was the rabbinical school sponsored by the Union for Traditional Judaism.

The Institute of Traditional Judaism was established in 1990. It was positioned to the left of Modern Orthodoxy and to the right of Conservative Judaism, and aimed to "give voice to the halakhic center."

The Reish Metivta was Rabbi Prof. David Weiss Halivni; notable faculty included Hakham Isaac S.D. Sassoon and Rabbi David Novak. A prominent graduate is Rabbi Brad Hirschfield.

From 1991 through 2010, The Metivta provided a semikhah (Rabbinic Ordination) Program for men only, the advanced Semikha Yoreh Yoreh, a Bet Midrash Program for men and women, and Continuing Education for Rabbis. It also offered, in cooperation with nearby Fairleigh Dickinson University, a Masters in Public Administration degree with a concentration in Jewish communal service. Since 2010 and the UTJ's move to New York from New Jersey, the Metivta offered only on-line learning.

Graduates of the rabbinical program were hired by both Conservative and Modern Orthodox synagogues, although the Rabbinical Council of America does not recognize ordination from UTJ.

== See also ==
- American Jewish University
- Yeshivat Chovevei Torah
- Rabbi Isaac Elchanan Theological Seminary
- Jewish Theological Seminary of America
- Hebrew Union College
- Academy for Jewish Religion (California)
- Academy for Jewish Religion (New York)
- Hebrew College
