= UTJ =

UTJ may refer to:

- Union for Traditional Judaism, American Jewish organization
- United Torah Judaism, Israeli political party
