= Torah Judaism =

Term used by Orthodox Jewish groups to describe their Judaism

Torah Judaism refers to schools of thought in Judaism perceived to be most adherent to the Torah and mitzvot. The term is often used by Orthodox Jewish groups to refer to their own system of beliefs.

These mitzvot include both the biblical and rabbinic mitzvot. The phrase Torah Judaism implies a belief and practice of Judaism that is based on the inclusion of the entire Tanakh and Talmud, as well as later rabbinic authorities, as sources of conducting oneself in life, and on the premise that the Torah emanates directly from God, as revealed at biblical Mount Sinai. The term "Torah Judaism" is consciously intended to label non-Orthodox Jewish religious movements as being divorced from the Torah.

Torah Judaism is also an ideological concept used by many Orthodox thinkers to describe their movement as the sole Jewish denomination faithful to traditional Jewish values.

Followers of Torah Judaism may also follow the Da'as Torah, i.e., the guidelines of rabbis or hakhamim based on the Talmud. In recent time, these hakhamim may include the followers' rebbes (Hasidic rabbis), rosh yeshivas (deans of yeshivas), or a posek, often identified as an expert in the Shulkhan Arukh. (This recognition of a posek is often limited to Haredi communities, as opposed to Modern Orthodox Jews, although the latter are also Torah-observant.)

== See also ==
- Degel HaTorah
- Haredi Judaism
- Jewish principles of faith
- Orthodox Judaism
- Rabbinic literature
- Relationships between Jewish religious movements
- Shas
- United Torah Judaism
