= National Jewish Center for Learning and Leadership =

The National Jewish Center for Learning and Leadership (CLAL) is a leadership training institute, think tank, and resource center. It is an inter-disciplinary and inter-denominational movement, in which rabbis from all major Jewish denominations in North America participate. The organization is described by The Jewish Daily Forward as a "think-tank dedicated to questions of Jewish identity and religious practice...in its quest to expand the boundaries of Jewish communal life".

Rabbi Brad Hirschfield presently serves as the president of CLAL.

Rabbi Elan Babchuck is the Executive Vice President.

== Etymology ==
CLAL is an acronym formed from the organization's English language name (Center for Leadership and Learning). It is also a transliteration of a Hebrew word that can mean community, as in the expression "Klal Yisrael" which refers to the Jewish people as a whole. It is intended to suggest the organization's stated mission to serve as a center of interdenominational cooperation in American Judaism.

== History ==
CLAL was founded in 1974 by Rabbi Irving Greenberg, Nobel Laureate Elie Wiesel, and Rabbi Steven Shaw.

== Programs ==
CLAL runs Rabbis without Borders.
