= Jewish schisms =

Splits along cultural as well as religious bases

Schisms among the Jews are cultural as well as religious. They have happened as a product of historical accident, geography, and theology.

== Samaritans ==
The Samaritans are an ethnoreligious group of the Levant originating from the Israelites (or Hebrews) of the Ancient Near East.

Ancestrally, Samaritans claim descent from the Tribe of Ephraim and Tribe of Manasseh (two sons of Joseph) as well as from the Levites, who have links to ancient Samaria from the period of their entry into Canaan, while some Orthodox Jews suggest that it was from the beginning of the Babylonian captivity up to the Samaritan polity under the rule of Baba Rabba. According to Samaritan tradition, the split between them and the Judean-led Southern Israelites began during the biblical time of the priest Eli when the Southern Israelites split off from the central Israelite tradition, as they perceive it.

They consider themselves to be B'nei Yisrael ('Children of Israel'), a term used universally by Jewish denominations for the Jewish people as a whole, but do not call themselves Yehudim. The word Yehudim comes from the Hebrew word Yehudi which means from the Tribe of Judah.

== First Temple period ==
The biblical narrative describes the split by the Kingdom of Israel from the Kingdom of Judah. It points to Solomon's unfaithfulness to the divine covenant as the reason for the schism. When Rehoboam, Solomon's son, became king, the people requested tax reform. Rehoboam refused. This caused the break. At first, Rehoboam considered a military solution but the prophet Shemaiah told him not to fight because God had caused the schism. Jeroboam, the leader of the tax revolt, became the leader of the Kingdom of Israel.

After the destruction and exile of the Kingdom of Israel by Assyria, non-Yahwistic practices continued. The narratives of Jeremiah and others interpreted this as the cause of the failure, destruction, and exile of the Kingdom of Judah by Babylonia. Nebuchadnezzar had additional reasons for taking over Judah and turning its inhabitants into exiles, including challenging its great rival Egypt.

== Second Temple period ==
Conflicts between Pharisees and Sadducees took place in the context of much broader and longstanding social and religious conflicts among Jews, made worse by the Roman occupation. Another conflict was cultural, between those who favored Hellenization (the Sadducees) and those who resisted it (the Pharisees). A third was juridico-religious, between those who emphasized the importance of the Second Temple with its rites and services, and those who emphasized the importance of other Mosaic Laws. A fourth point of conflict, specifically religious, involved different interpretations of the Torah and how to apply it to current Jewish life, with Sadducees recognizing only the Written Torah (with Greek philosophy) and rejecting doctrines such as the Oral Torah, the Prophets, the Writings, and the resurrection of the dead.

According to Josephus, the Sadducees differed from the Pharisees on a number of doctrinal grounds, notably rejecting ideas of life after death. They appear to have dominated the aristocracy and the temple, but their influence over the wider Jewish population was limited.

The Essenes preached a reclusive way of life. The Zealots advocated armed rebellion against any foreign power such as Rome. All were at violent loggerheads with each other, leading to the confusion and disunity that ended with the destruction of the Second Temple and the sacking of Jerusalem by Rome.

== Split of early Christianity and Judaism ==
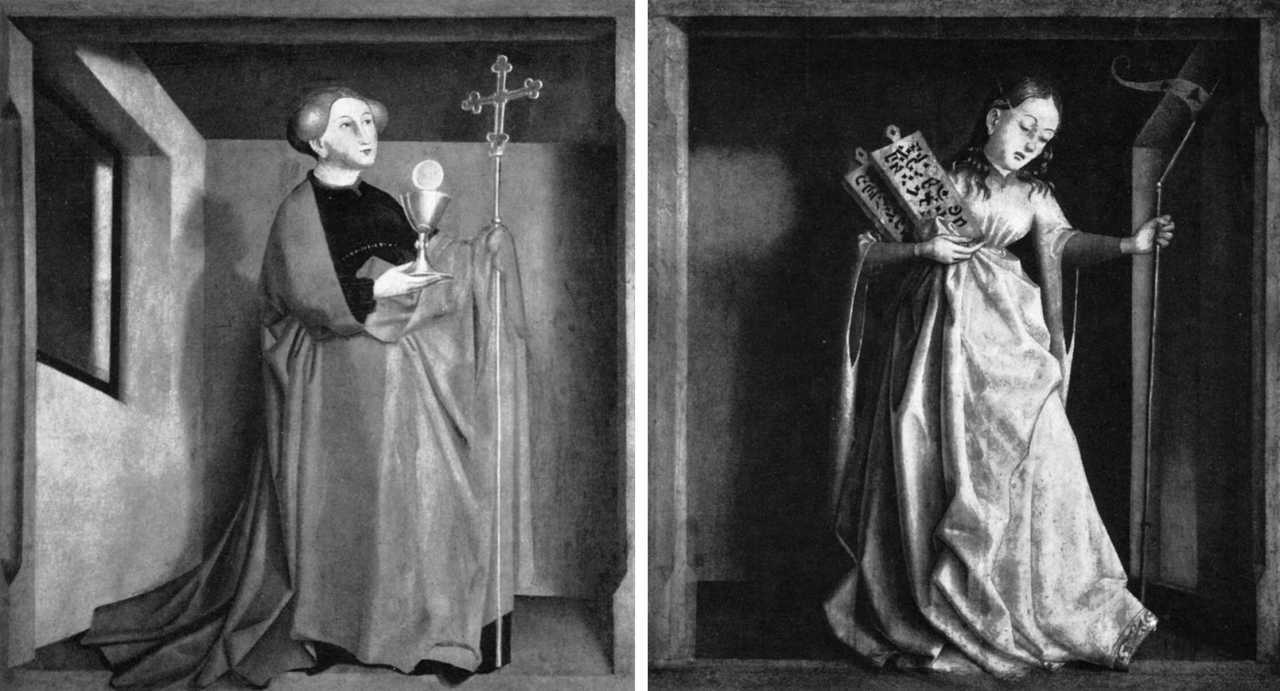
Ecclesia and Synagoga by Konrad Witz (1400–1447).

The first Christians (whom historians refer to as Jewish Christians) were the original Jewish followers of Jesus, a Galilean preacher and, according to early Christian belief, the resurrected Messiah. After his crucifixion by the Romans, his followers broke over whether they should continue to observe Jewish law, such as at the Council of Jerusalem. Those who argued that the law was abrogated (either partially or fully, either by Jesus or Paul or by the Roman destruction of the Temple) broke to form Christianity.

The eventual repudiation of Moses' Law by Jesus' disciples and their belief in his divinity, along with the development of the New Testament, ensured that Christianity and Judaism would become different and often conflicting religions. The New Testament depicts the Sadducees and Pharisees as Jesus' opponents (see Woes of the Pharisees). In contrast, the Jewish perspective has the Pharisees as the justified predecessors of the rabbis who upheld the Torah, including the Oral law, which Christians refer to as the Mosaic Law or Pentateuch or "Old Covenant" in contrast to the "New Covenant".

== Karaite Judaism ==
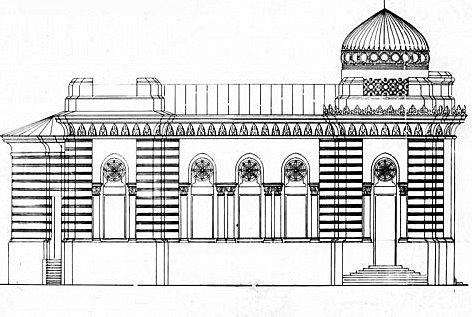
Karaite Kenesa, Kyiv, Ukraine.

Karaite Judaism is a Jewish denomination characterized by reliance on the Tanakh as the sole source of binding Jewish Law. Karaites rejected the rabbinic tenet that an Oral Torah (oral law) was transmitted to Moses at Mount Sinai along with the written scriptures. Accordingly, they rejected the central works of Rabbinic Judaism which claimed to expound and interpret this written law, including the Midrash and the Talmud, as authoritative on questions of Jewish law. They may consult or discuss various interpretations of the Tanakh, but Karaites do not consider these other sources as binding or authoritative. Karaites prefer to use the peshat method of study, seeking a meaning within the text that would have been naturally understood by the ancient Hebrews.

Karaites had a wide following between the 9th and 12th centuries (they claim that at one time they numbered perhaps 10 percent of Jewry), but over the centuries their numbers have dwindled drastically. Today they are a small group, living mostly in Israel; estimates of the number of Israeli Karaites range from as low as 10,000 to as high as 50,000.

There is a divergence of views about the historical origins of Karaite Judaism. Most scholars and some Karaites maintain that it was founded at least in part by Anan ben David, whereas other Karaites believe that they are not the historical disciples of Anan ben David at all, and point out that many of their later sages (such as Ya'acov Al-Kirkisani) argued that most of Anan's teachings were "derived from Rabbanite Lore."

The state of Israel, along with its Chief Rabbinate, ruled that Karaites are Jews, and while critical differences between Orthodox Judaism and Karaite Judaism exist, American Orthodox rabbis ruled that Karaism is much closer to Orthodoxy than the Conservative and Reform movements, which may ease issues of formal conversion.

== Sabbateans and Frankists ==
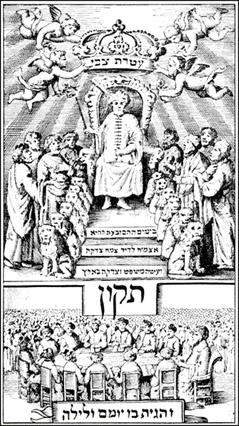
Sabbatai Zevi crowned as the messiah. Amsterdam, 1666.

In 1648, Sabbatai Zevi declared himself to be the long-awaited Jewish Messiah whilst living in the Ottoman Empire. Vast numbers of Jews, known as Sabbateans, believed him. Still, when under pain of a death sentence in front of the Ottoman sultan Mehmed IV, he became an apostate from Judaism by becoming a Muslim, his movement crumbled. Nevertheless, for centuries, small groups of Jews believed in him, and the rabbis were always on guard against any manifestations of this schism, always suspicious of hidden Shebselekh (Yiddish for "little Sabbatians," a play on the word for "young dumb sheep"). When the movement of Hasidism began attracting many followers, the rabbis were again suspicious that this was Sabbatianism in different forms. It would take centuries to sort out these complex divisions and schisms.

After his mysterious death somewhere in the area of Ottoman Albania, groups of Jews continued to be clandestine followers of Shabbatai Sevi even though they had outwardly converted to Islam, these Jews being known as the Donmeh. Jewish converts to Islam were, at times, therefore, regarded with great suspicion by their fellow Muslims.

A few decades after Shabbatai Sevi's death, a man named Jacob Frank, claiming mystical powers, preached that he was Shabbatai Sevi's successor. He attracted a following, preached against the Talmud, advocated a form of licentious worship, and was condemned by the rabbis then. When confronted by the Polish authorities, he converted to Catholicism in 1759 in the presence of King Augustus III of Poland, together with groups of his Jewish followers, known as "Frankists." To the alarm of his opponents, he was received by reigning European monarchs who were anxious to see their Jewish subjects abandon Judaism and apostacise. The Frankists eventually joined the Polish nobility and gentry.

== Hasidim and Misnagdim ==
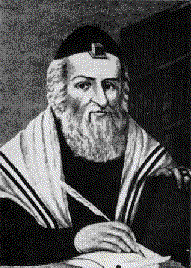
Rabbi Elijah ben Shlomo Zalman, the Vilna Gaon, leader of the Misnagdim

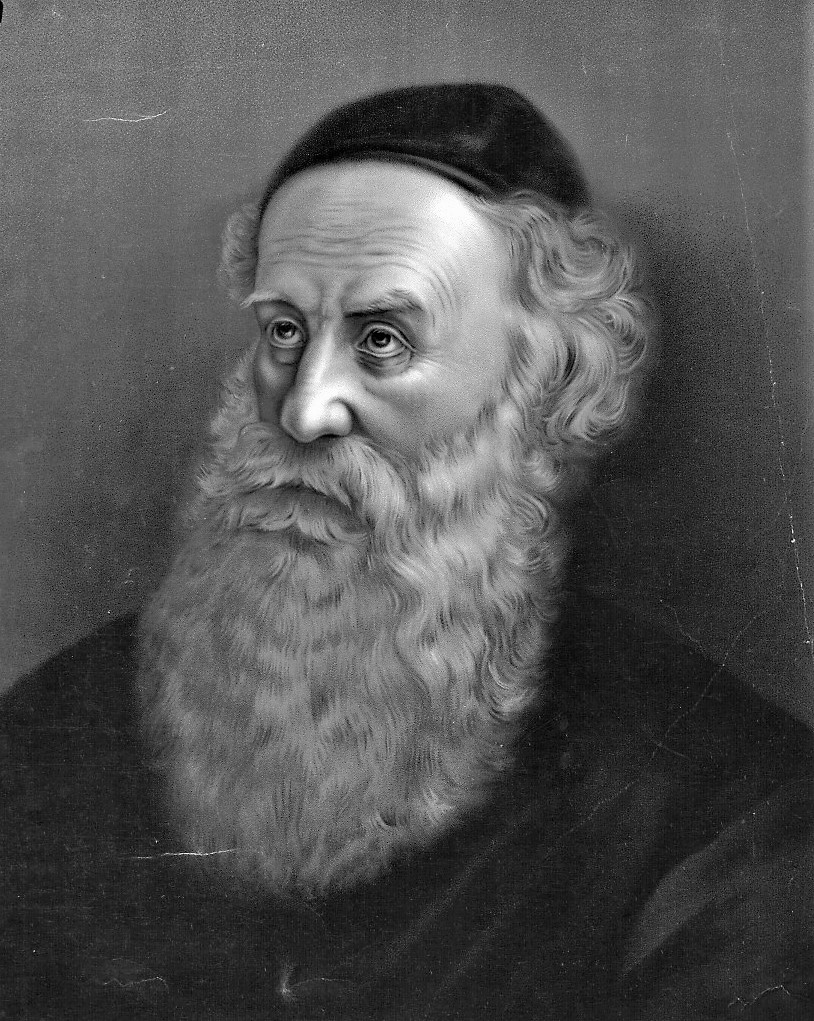
Rabbi Shneur Zalman of Liadi, founder of Chabad-Lubavitch

Israel ben Eliezer (1698–1760), also known as the Baal Shem Tov ('Master [of the] Good Name'), changed much of Jewish history in Eastern Europe for what is now known as Haredi Judaism. His teachings were based on the earlier expositions of Rabbi Isaac Luria (1534–1572) who had based much of his Kabbalistic teachings on the Zohar. Baal Shem Tov came after Jews of Eastern Europe were collectively recovering from false messiahs Shabtai Tzvi (1626–1676) and Jacob Frank (1726–1791) in particular.

Baal Shem Tov witnessed Frank's public apostasy (shmad in Hebrew) to Christianity, which compounded Tzvi's earlier apostasy to Islam. Baal Shem Tov was thus determined to encourage his influential disciples (talmidim) to launch a spiritual revolution in Jewish life in order to reinvigorate the Jewish masses' connections with Torah Judaism and to vigorously motivate them to bind themselves to the joyous observance of the commandments, worship, Torah study, and sincere belief in God, so that the lures of Christianity and Islam, and the appeal of the rising secular Enlightenment, to the Jewish masses would be weakened and halted. To a large degree he succeeded in Eastern Europe.

Already during his lifetime, and gaining momentum following his death, Baal Shem Tov's disciples spread out to teach his mystical creeds all over Eastern Europe. Thus was born Hasidic Judaism (Hasidism). Some of the main movements were in: Russia which saw the rise of the Chabad-Lubavitch movement; Poland which had the Gerrer Hasidim; Galicia had Bobov; Hungary had Satmar Hasidim; and Ukraine had the Breslovers, and many others that grew rapidly, gaining millions of adherents, until it became the dominant brand of Judaism.

Only when this new religious movement reached Lithuania did it meet its first stiff resistance at the hands of the Lithuanian Jews (Litvaks). It was Rabbi Elijah ben Shlomo Zalman (c. 1720 – 1797), known as the Vilna Gaon ("Genius [of] Vilna"), and those who followed his classic stringent Talmudic and Halakhic scholasticism, who put up the fiercest resistance to the Hasidim ("devoted [ones]"). They were called Mitnagdim, meaning "[those who are] opposed [to the Hasidim]".

The Vilna Gaon, who was himself steeped in both Talmudic and Kabbalistic wisdom, analyzed the theological underpinnings of this new "Hasidism" and in his view, concluded that it was deeply flawed since it had elements of what may be roughly termed as panentheism and perhaps even outright pantheism, dangerous aspirations for bringing the Jewish Messiah that could easily be twisted in unpredictable directions for Jewry as had previously happened with the Tzvi and Frank religious "revival" fiascos, and an array of complex rejections of their religious ideology. The Vilna Gaon's views were later formulated by his chief disciple Rabbi Chaim Volozhin (1741–1821) in his work Nefesh HaChaim. The new Hasidic leaders countered with their own religious counter-arguments, some of which can be found in the Tanya of Chabad-Lubavitch.

Little of the split between Hasidim and Mitnagdim remains within the modern Haredi world. In modern-day Israel Hasidim support the Agudat Israel party in the Knesset (Israel's parliament) and the non-Hasidic Mitnagdim support the Degel HaTorah party, led by Rabbi Chaim Kanievsky and Rabbi Gershon Eidelstein. Agudat Israel and Degel Torah have formed a political alliance, the United Torah Judaism party. There is also another large community that follows the rabbinical teachings of the Edah Charedis. These include the Satmar Hasidim and the perushim communities, which do not support any groups that participate in the Israeli government or state activities, including elections.

== Orthodox versus Reform ==
From the time of the French Revolution of 1789, and the growth of Liberalism, added to the political and personal freedoms granted by Napoleon to the Jews of Europe, many Jews chose to abandon the foreboding and isolating ghettos and enter into general society. This influenced the internal conflicts about religion, culture, and politics of the Jews to this day.

Some Jews in Western Europe, and many Jews in America, joined the religiously liberal Reform Judaism movement, which drew inspiration from the writings of modernist thinkers like Moses Mendelson. They coined the name "Orthodox" to describe those who opposed the "Reform". They were criticized by the Orthodox rabbis, such as Samson Raphael Hirsch in Germany, and condemned particularly by those known today as followers of Haredi Judaism, based mainly in Eastern Europe. (Later on, in 1880s America, Conservative Judaism split from the Reform movement.)

Thus a cultural schism was also created between the more Western German-, English- and French-speaking Western European Jews and their more religiously observant Yiddish-speaking Eastern European brethren whom they denigratingly labeled Ostjuden ("Eastern Jews"). These schisms and the debates surrounding them, continue with much ferocity in all Jewish communities today as the Reform and Orthodox movements continue to confront each other over a wide range of religious, social, political and ethnic issues. (Today, the largest Jewish communities are in Israel and in the United States, and the geographical separation has resulted in cultural differences, such as a tendency to identify as hiloni and haredi in Israel, as opposed to, say, Reform and Orthodox in the United States.)

== See also ==
- Apostasy in Judaism
- Criticism of Judaism
- Epikoros
- Heresy in Judaism
- Jewish atheism
- Jewish religious movements
- Jewish secularism
- Jewish Science
- List of Israelite civil conflicts
- Reconstructionist Judaism
- Relationships between Jewish religious movements
- Religion in Israel
