= Brad Hirschfield =

Brad Hirschfield (born 1963) is a rabbi, author, and president of the National Jewish Center for Learning and Leadership (CLAL). Hirschfield was ranked three years in a row in Newsweek as one of America's "50 Most Influential Rabbis" and recognized as a leading “Preacher & Teacher” by Beliefnet.com.

== Biography ==
Hirschfield received his rabbinical ordination from the Institute of Traditional Judaism. He received his M.A. and M. Phil from the Jewish Theological Seminary, a Conservative institution, and his B.A. from the University of Chicago. He self-identifies as an Orthodox rabbi.

Hirschfield was raised in a secular Jewish home but began to pursue a more traditionally observant life as a teenager thus becoming a baal teshuva. He moved to Israel and became involved with a settler group near Hebron. Becoming disenchanted with this approach, he returned to the United States, where he met and worked for Orthodox rabbi and CLAL founder Irving Greenberg. He went on to pursue his own rabbinical studies, and became a proponent of interfaith dialogue and pluralist attitudes.

Hirschfield is the current president of Clal - The National Jewish Center for Learning and Leadership, which describes itself as "A leadership training institute, think tank and resource center committed to religious pluralism and the healthier use of religion in American public life."

in 2002 Hirschfield was featured on ABC's Nightline UpClose, and PBS's Frontline: Faith and Doubt at Ground Zero In 2009 he was interviewed on the National Public Radio program Tell Me More, and in 2010 for the Australian Broadcasting Corporation's The Spirit of Things hosted by Rachael Kohn.

== Works ==
Hirschfield is the editor of Remember for Life: Holocaust Survivors’ Stories of Faith and Hope and a co-author of Embracing Life & Facing Death: A Jewish Guide to Palliative Care. In 2008 he published You Don’t Have To Be Wrong For Me To Be Right: Finding Faith Without Fanaticism, described by a reviewer in The Christian Century as "a breathtaking treatise on the perils of rigid religious behavior".

Hirschfield conceived and hosted two series for Bridges TV, an American Muslim television network: Building Bridges: Abrahamic Perspectives on the World Today (three seasons) and American Pilgrimage. With his CLAL co-president Irwin Kula he co-hosts a weekly radio show called Hirschfield and Kula on KXL in Portland, Oregon.

Hirschfield writes a column, "For God’s Sake," for The Washington Post’s On Faith section. He writes the "Windows and Doors" blog for Beliefnet, where he is featured as a "Preacher and Teacher." He is a regular commentator on ethical issues for truTV.

He was featured, along with students and professors from the University of Oklahoma religious studies program, in a documentary entitled, Freaks Like Me, on the subject of religion in the age of terrorism.

== Public positions ==
Hirschfield has expressed concern on the lifting of the excommunication of bishop Richard Williamson, a member of the Society of Saint Pius X.
