= Conservadox =

Category of American Jewry

The term Conservadox is occasionally applied to describe either individuals or congregations located on the religious continuum somewhere between the Conservative and Modern Orthodox wings of American Jewry. The term "Traditionally Jewish" is also sparingly used for roughly the same sector, as in the Union for Traditional Judaism.

Until the 1970s, traditional Conservative and liberal Orthodox synagogues had substantial overlap, with many congregations calling themselves either Orthodox or Conservative that combined a traditional liturgy in a synagogue with mixed-gender seating with traditional but lenient or lax personal observance among the membership. "Orthodox" and "Conservative" congregations could be almost identical in liturgy and practices, with a substantial interdenominational blurring. Changes in both the Conservative and Orthodox movements came to distinguish both more clearly, leaving an increasing gap between them.

Beginning in 1973, the Conservative movement began more actively involving women in services, and following the Conservative decision to ordain women as Rabbis in 1983, ritual egalitarianism became a distinguishing characteristic of Conservative synagogues. Although a small minority of Conservative congregations continue to maintain traditional roles, the minority became very small (10% or less) by the end of the 20th century. Throughout the 1980s and 1990s, the Conservative movement moved leftward on a variety of liturgical and social issues, shortening services, changing the traditional liturgy, developing new rules for women, and supporting liberal positions on such issues as abortion, homosexuality, public religion displays, and more. More traditional Conservative synagogues became an ever-shrinking minority.

On the Orthodox side, in the 1980s, the Orthodox Union, the principal Modern Orthodox organization of synagogues, began requiring member synagogues which previously had mixed seating to build a mechitza with separate seating for men and women or de-affiliate, thus creating an irreconcilable physical distinction between the most liberal OU synagogues and the most traditional Conservative ones. Beth Midrash Hagadol-Beth Joseph in Denver, Colorado was the last remaining OU-affiliated synagogue to have mixed seating, having reached a compromise with the organization in 1988 to retain its status if a gender-segregated minyan was also held on the Sabbath. In 2015, when the OU changed course and began planning to expel BMH-BJ, the synagogue made the decision to disaffiliate. In addition, social trends in Judaism and in the larger society have reflected an increased rightward trend in Orthodoxy, including Modern, on matters of both ritual and social outlook. The Haredi segment, which believes in separation from secular culture and in a pronounced distinction between men and women, has had increasing influence.

As a result, those who a generation ago could feel comfortable in either an Orthodox or a Conservative setting have become increasingly isolated from both as the gap between the two has widened. This trend has led to attempts to experiment with new organizations and liturgical styles at both the right of Conservatism and the left of Orthodoxy to appeal to this constituency.

== Regional purview ==
"Conservadox Jews" are largely a North American phenomenon, although similar trends can be identified in Israel and Europe. Congregations of a "Conservadox" persuasion have formed affiliations such as the Union for Traditional Judaism in the United States and the Canadian Council of Conservative Synagogues.

== See also ==
- Open Orthodoxy
- Modern Orthodoxy
- Conservative Judaism
- Neo-Hasidic Judaism
- Transdenominational and Postdenominational Judaism
