= Rabbinical Seminary International =

Rabbinical seminary in New York City, New York

- New York City; United States

Information
- Type: Jewish seminary
- Established: 1992
- Founder: Rabbi Joseph H. Gelberman
- Director: Rabbi Jill Hausman
- Faculty: Rabbis Mary Newman, Frank Tamburello and Roger Ross
- Website: https://www.rabbinicalseminaryint.org

The Rabbinical Seminary International (RSI) is a nondenominational rabbinical seminary in the Neo-Hasidic tradition, founded by the Hungarian Hasidic rabbi and Kabbalist Joseph H. Gelberman, a graduate of the City University of New York and Yeshiva University, who is also known as a pioneer in inter-religious dialogue. The RSI prepares students to become teachers, counselors, and spiritual guides. Students seeking ordination as rabbis follow a self-guided curriculum with support from rabbinical mentors, typically completing their studies in two to three years before receiving semikhah. RSI is the oldest non-denominational yeshiva in North America, offering traditional rabbinical and cantorial programs. Its graduates have described their experience at RSI in articles in Tablet magazine and the Jewish Standard.

== Notable alumni ==
- Patrick Beaulier, American writer, blogger, podcaster, and non-denominational rabbi
- Steven Blane, American rabbi, cantor, and recording singer-songwriter
