= Isaac S.D. Sassoon =

British Sephardic rabbi (1946-)

Isaac S. D. Sassoon (born 1946) is a Sephardic rabbi (hakham), scholar and educator. Currently one of the leading scholars in the Sephardic world, he was born into the Sassoon family of London and grew up speaking Judeo-Arabic.

== Biography ==
Hakham Sassoon's initial education was under the tutelage of his father, the scholar Rabbi Solomon David Sassoon, Hakham Yosef Doury, and others. His later studies were at the Gateshead Yeshiva and various yeshivoth in Israel. He holds a Ph.D. in Literature from the University of Lisbon.

Continuing his family's academic tradition, Hakham Sassoon has published on topics ranging from Scriptural commentary and history, to issues of current concern to the Jewish community. Hakham Sassoon teaches at the Institute of Traditional Judaism and lectures widely.

Highly esteemed in the Sephardic community, Hakham Sassoon has contributed to the maintenance of the heritage of the Babylonian Jewish community and has provided the Syrian Jewish community with an updated and corrected siddur (Jewish prayer book) reflecting that community's traditions.

In 2011 he published a book called The Status of Women in Jewish Tradition addressing the particular religious tradition's outlook on women. He primarily refers to the Torah, Talmud, and Dead Sea Scrolls in exploring the authentic position on the "continuum of patriarchal condescension." His goal, in writing the book, was to give authentic answers to a popular question.

== Selected works ==
- The Status of Women in Jewish Tradition, Cambridge University Press (2011)
- Destination Torah: Notes and Reflections on Selected Verses from the Weekly Torah Readings, a commentary on the Pentateuch on the light of critical studies (Hebrew language edition Ve-ha'arev Na), ISBN 0-88125-639-0 ISBN 0-88125-639-0
- Uriel da Costa, Examination of Pharisaic Traditions, ed. and trans. with Herman Prins Salomon, Brill, Leiden, (1993) [orig. ed. Amsterdam, 1623]
- The Marrano Factory: The Portuguese Inquisition and Its New Christians 1536-1765, Antonio Jose Sariava (Author), Herman Prins Salomon (Translator), I. S. D. Sassoon (Translator), Leiden, 2001. ISBN 90-04-12080-7
- Siddur Ve-ha'arev Na (2007), a prayerbook according to the Syrian nusach.
- "Siddur עָלַץ לִבִּי"

=== Articles ===
- The Relevance for Today of Uriel Da Costa's 'Examination of Pharisaic Traditions' , Studia Rosenthaliana, vol. 28, no. 1 (1994)
- Et Lirpoh (A Time to Heal), Hadoar, vol. 82, no. 4 (2004).
- Review essay on Agunot entitled Ra'ah Ma'aseh Ve'Nizkar Halakhah, Judaism, vol. 54, nos. 1-2 (2005)
