= Union for Traditional Judaism =

Jewish outreach and communal service organization

Union of Traditional Judaism
- Abbreviation: UTJ
- Formation: 1984; 42 years ago
- Formerly called: Union of Traditional Conservative Judaism

The Union for Traditional Judaism (UTJ), founded in 1984, is a traditional, halakhic Jewish outreach and communal service organization. It initially called itself "The Union for Traditional Conservative Judaism" but dropped "Conservative" from its title when it broke with Conservative Judaism. In 1985, Rabbi Ronald D. Price was tapped to lead the organization as executive director and later as executive vice-president. He served in that capacity for 26 years until his retirement in 2011. He was succeeded by Rabbi David Bauman, and then by Rabbi Gerald Sussman, who was the organization's executive director as of 2018. In 1988, after attempting to effect change within Conservative Judaism, the UTJ membership voted to drop the word "Conservative" from its title. Following two years of negotiations, the Rabbinic Fellowship of the UTJ absorbed a Modern Orthodox rabbinic organization, the Fellowship of Traditional Orthodox Rabbis. The merged rabbinic body is known as MORASHAH, an acronym of מועצת רבנים שומרי ההלכה (mōʿeṣet rabbanîm šōmrê ha-hălākhāh, lit. 'Council of rabbis [who] guard the Halakha'). Some UTJ leaders have called themselves Conservative, Modern Orthodox, or trans-denominational. The UTJ's Institute of Traditional Judaism (ITJ; המתיבתא ללימודי היהדות) granted semikhah to a number of rabbis, though as of 2018 there are no current semikhah students. The UTJ's Panel of Halakhic Inquiry has published three volumes of responsa titled Tomeikh kaHalakhah. The UTJ produced the educational curriculum "Taking the MTV Challenge—Media and Torah Values," designed to provide high school students with tools to respond to electronic media. The UTJ is often viewed as representing a denomination or inhabiting an ideological space between Conservative and Orthodox Judaism.

== Origins ==
The Union for Traditional Judaism, originally known as the Union for Traditional Conservative Judaism, was founded in the fall of 1984 by a group of laypeople and rabbis who were disaffected with the perceived shift within Conservative leadership, particularly at the Jewish Theological Seminary of America (JTS), away from traditional Halakha. Its antecedent was a group of traditionalist Conservative rabbis, led by former JTS Talmud professor Rabbi David Weiss Halivni, which broke with the movement because of ideological differences, including the approach to changes in Halakha and the manner in which the issue of admitting women to the rabbinate was addressed.

Halivni and other traditionalists claimed that, in this and other areas of Jewish law, the Conservative movement had changed traditional practices legislatively rather than judicially, by poll or majority vote. Traditionalists believed that halakhic decision-making should be made by Talmudic and halakhic scholars following a process of legal reasoning.

One of the most prestigious Talmudic scholars of the 20th and 21st century, Halivni had written a responsum that could permit a more limited role of women as rabbis, although by a more gradual process than the one approved by the Conservative movement. Halivni withdrew this responsum prior to leaving the Conservative movement and founding the UTJ. The UTJ issued a responsum opposing the ordination of women in its first volume of responsa.

The Union originally intended to form the elements of a separate denomination, including an association of rabbis, a rabbinical school, and an association of synagogues. The organization subsequently described itself as transdenominational.

== Beliefs and practices ==
The Union for Traditional Judaism attempts to combine modern approaches to studying Judaism's sacred texts, including the use of critical methods and the study of approaches such as the Documentary hypothesis, with what it regards as classical approaches to interpreting and making decisions regarding Halakha. As such, it stands in between Modern Orthodox Judaism, which retains a belief that the current written Torah and Oral Torah were transmitted in an unbroken tradition from what was received by Moses on Mount Sinai through Divine revelation, and Conservative Judaism, which in the UTJ's view has sometimes permitted personal views to override classical halakhic scholarship. The Union endorsed women's prayer groups. The Metivta, its rabbinical school, did not ordain women as rabbis.

David Weiss Halivni, one of the Union founders and the head of its rabbinical school, has written extensively on an approach to harmonizing the perspectives of contemporary biblical criticism (as well as critical study of the Talmud) with traditional religious belief. In his books Peshat and Derash and Revelation Restored, he developed the concept he called Chate'u Israel ('Israel sinned'), in which he argued that the biblical texts were originally given to Moses on Mount Sinai, but they subsequently became irretrievably corrupted and the texts we currently have were redacted by editors in an effort to restore them.

=== Relationship to Conservative Judaism ===
Major differences between the UTJ and the United Synagogue of Conservative Judaism exist due to UTJ rabbis generally choosing halakhic options with regards to issues related to women, or in the use of siddurim. For instance, UTJ synagogues follow the practice of having separate seating for men and women, and are not allowed to serve as shlikhei tzibbur (prayer leaders)—both positions considered halakhically valid by Conservative rabbis.

In Jewish Choices by Lazerwitz, Winter, Dashefsky, and Tabory, the Union for Traditional Judaism is viewed as a denomination within Conservative Judaism. When describing the creation of the UTJ, Stefan Reif refers to the founding members of the UTJ as "traditionalists" within the Conservative movement. Many other sources, however, describe the Union for Traditional Judaism as a new religious movement positioned between Orthodoxy and the Conservative movement.

== The Institute of Traditional Judaism/The Metivta ==
The Institute of Traditional Judaism, also known as The Metivta, was the rabbinical school sponsored by the UTJ. From 1991 through 2010, The Metivta provided a semikhah (Rabbinic Ordination) Program, a Bet Midrash Program for men and women, and Continuing Education for Rabbis. It also offered, in cooperation with nearby Fairleigh Dickinson University, a Masters in Public Administration degree with a concentration in Jewish communal service. Since 2010 and the UTJ’s move to New York from New Jersey, the Metivta offered only on-line learning. Graduates of the rabbinical program have been hired by both Conservative and Orthodox synagogues.

== Financial difficulties ==
The Union for Traditional Judaism filed for bankruptcy during the Great Recession. It emerged from bankruptcy in January 2011, but sold its headquarters building in Teaneck, NJ, to pay its debts at 100 cents on the dollar. The building was purchased by Congregation Netivot Shalom, which had been UTJ's Teaneck congregation.

== Important figures ==
- David Weiss Halivni - Rabbi, talmud scholar, and Reish Metivta of the UTJ's rabbinical school.
- David Novak - Rabbi and theologian. He currently teaches at the University of Toronto and the Institute of Traditional Judaism.
- Isaac S.D. Sassoon - Sephardic Rabbi and scholar. He currently teaches at the Institute of Traditional Judaism.
- Bruce Ginsburg - Rabbi, spiritual leader of Congregation Sons of Israel, Woodmere, NY, past president of UTJ
- Ronald D. Price - Rabbi, founding UTJ Executive Vice President, Emeritus and founding ITJ Dean, Emeritus

== See also ==
- Conservadox
- Conservative Halakha
- Role of women in Judaism
