= International Federation of Rabbis =

Organization

International Federation of Rabbis (IFR)
- IFR logo
- Established: 2000
- Type: International Rabbinic Organization
- Purpose: Religious
- Website: intfedrabbis.org

The International Federation of Rabbis (IFR) was founded in 2000 as a rabbinic association which provides a much needed service to rabbis worldwide. The vision of the IFR is to function as a practical resource for rabbis of all backgrounds who want and need a forum to examine and adapt to a changing Judaism in the 21st century. IFR members stay connected with their colleagues worldwide through a private list serve, private interactive website, which contains a Jewish resource library, and a newsletter published four times a year. From time to time the IFR hosts a rabbinic conference in Delray Beach, Florida.

IFR's rabbis have been noted within and outside of the Jewish community for the diverse backgrounds and perspectives they bring to Jewish pastoral care.

== Conferences ==
IFR hosts a biyearly conference for its members at which various topics in Jewish pastoral care and Torah scholarship are discussed.
