= Steven Blane =

American rabbi

Rabbi Steven Blane

Personal life
- Born: Steven Blane Jersey City, New Jersey
- Education: Jersey City State College

Religious life
- Religion: Judaism
- Denomination: Jewish Universalism

Jewish leader
- Synagogue: Sim Shalom Synagogue
- Organisation: Jewish Spiritual Leaders Institute
- Began: 2010
- Other: Cantor, Congregation Beth Israel of Northern Valley, Bergenfield, New Jersey
- Residence: Manhattan
- Semikhah: Rabbinical Seminary International

Steven Blane is an American rabbi, cantor and recording singer-songwriter.

Rabbi Blane, a Universalist rabbi and cantor, conducts his teaching and pastoral work online. He is the founder and dean of the Jewish Spiritual Leaders Institute, an online, one-year rabbinical school, and founder and spiritual leader of Sim Shalom Synagogue, an interactive Universalist cyber-synagogue that offers live weeknight and Shabbat synagogue services to an international community via computer hookup.

In addition to his work as a rabbi and cantor, Blane is a recording artist singer-songwriter. He writes and performs in the Americana/Folk/Rock genres. He sings, plays guitar, piano and ukulele. Blane has recorded three albums. A fourth album " I Confess" is scheduled for release in December 2016. " I Confess" was produced at Dark Star in TN with famed Christian, Country and Rock music producer Billy Smiley.

== Biography ==
Blane was raised in an Orthodox family in Jersey City, New Jersey. He attended elementary and junior high school at the Yeshiva of Hudson County and had an Orthodox bar mitzvah. He attended the Rogosin Yeshiva High School run by the Lubavitch movement in Jersey City. He earned a B.A. in music education from Jersey City State College.

After graduation he worked as an actor and singer on and off-Broadway. He wrote and produced Benjamin Poe, a 1981 off-off-Broadway musical thriller. He also co-founded Blane & DeRosa Productions and also produced children's book recordings and audiobooks for the Scholastic Corporation, Random House and other publishers.

At age 34 Blane undertook private studies to become a cantor and was accepted into the Cantors Assembly, the association of Conservative cantors. From 1994 to 1998 he served as the cantor of the First Hebrew Congregation of Peekskill, New York, a Conservative congregation, and also served as that congregation's spiritual leader from 1997 to 1998. In 1996 he was the cantor of Temple Beth Haverim of Mahwah, New Jersey, a Reform congregation. From 1999 to 2006 he was the cantor of Congregation Beth Israel of Northern Valley, Bergenfield, New Jersey, a Conservative congregation. From 2006 to 2009 he officiated as rabbi and cantor at Congregation Beth Tikvah/New Milford Jewish Center.

Blane received his rabbinic ordination in June 2001 from Rabbi Joseph Gelberman of the Rabbinical Seminary International in New York City. He chose this trans-denominational seminary for its short ordination time (two years) as opposed to five years at the Reform Hebrew Union College and four years at the nondenominational Academy for Jewish Religion. His experience pursuing his ordination influenced his development of the Jewish Spiritual Leaders Institute, whose graduates are "not necessarily trying to minister to mainstream communities ... [and] are not likely to be accepted by some of the mainstream Jewish world, either".

== Jewish Spiritual Leaders Institute ==
Blane founded the Jewish Spiritual Leaders Institute in New York City in 2010. The rabbinical program for Jewish Professionals is student-driven, with Blane serving as moderator for student online chats. Blane conducts a once-weekly, 2-hour videoconferencing session which teaches "traditional davening and praying" followed by student-led discussions on subjects such as Jewish law, holidays, or festivals. Each student also prepares a weekly D’var Torah (talk on a topic in the weekly Torah portion). Rabbinical candidates are required to participate in online chats and submit "a 2,000-word research paper in a Jewish area of their choice". Students meet each other in person for the first time at their ordination.

In line with his belief in Jewish Universalism and religious pluralism, Blane actively courts students from Jewish and non-Jewish backgrounds. "I don't believe that Jewish people were uniquely chosen for a relationship with God – God doesn't choose a favorite child", he is quoted as saying. He believes that converts in particular are able to establish an affinity with the estimated 50% of Jews who are unaffiliated or intermarried. One-third of his rabbinical school students are converts. In 2012, Blane ordained Dario Hunter, an openly gay man born to a Muslim father and African American mother who was fired by the synagogue where he was rabbi for opposing financial support for Israel, as well as a former Catholic from Brazil.

As of November 2016, Blane has ordained a total of 112 rabbis, including 2 cantors. Graduates of the school are not recognized by the Conservative Rabbinical Assembly or the Reform Central Conference of American Rabbis; however, they do conduct their own weddings, funerals, and High Holy Day services.

== Sim Shalom Online Synagogue ==
Blane is also the founder of Sim Shalom Synagogue, an interactive Universalist cyber-synagogue, which offers live weeknight and Sabbath synagogue services to an international community via computer hookup. The platform offers an interactive chat feature that allows participants from around the globe to converse in real time with the rabbi(s) and each other during services.

The liturgy of the synagogue is fully participatory in that everything is viewable on the computer screen of the worshiper. The Synagogue's siddurim (prayerbooks) and prayers are transliterated into English. The Sim Shalom Synagogue is a USA not-for-profit 501(c)(3) corporation.

== UJUC ==
Rabbi Blane is the founder of the new Jewish movement Jewish Universalism, launched in 2015 to foster Jewish worship and rituals without restrictions. It embraces the diversity of the Jewish world and all its Jewish denominations.

The UJUC Union of Jewish Universalist Communities adheres and promotes the understanding to live one's faith guided by a love of Jewish tradition.

== Positions ==
Blane supports the traditional brit milah (ritual circumcision) ceremony, but advocates the brit shalom, as an acceptable non-invasive naming ceremony for Jewish male infants.

Blane is listed as the officiating rabbi at various types of wedding ceremonies, including interfaith weddings between Jews and Christians.

== Personal life ==
Blane had previously lived in Haworth, New Jersey and lives with his wife and children in Manhattan. He plays piano and guitar.
