= David Novak =

American rabbi and philosopher (born 1941)

David Novak FRSC
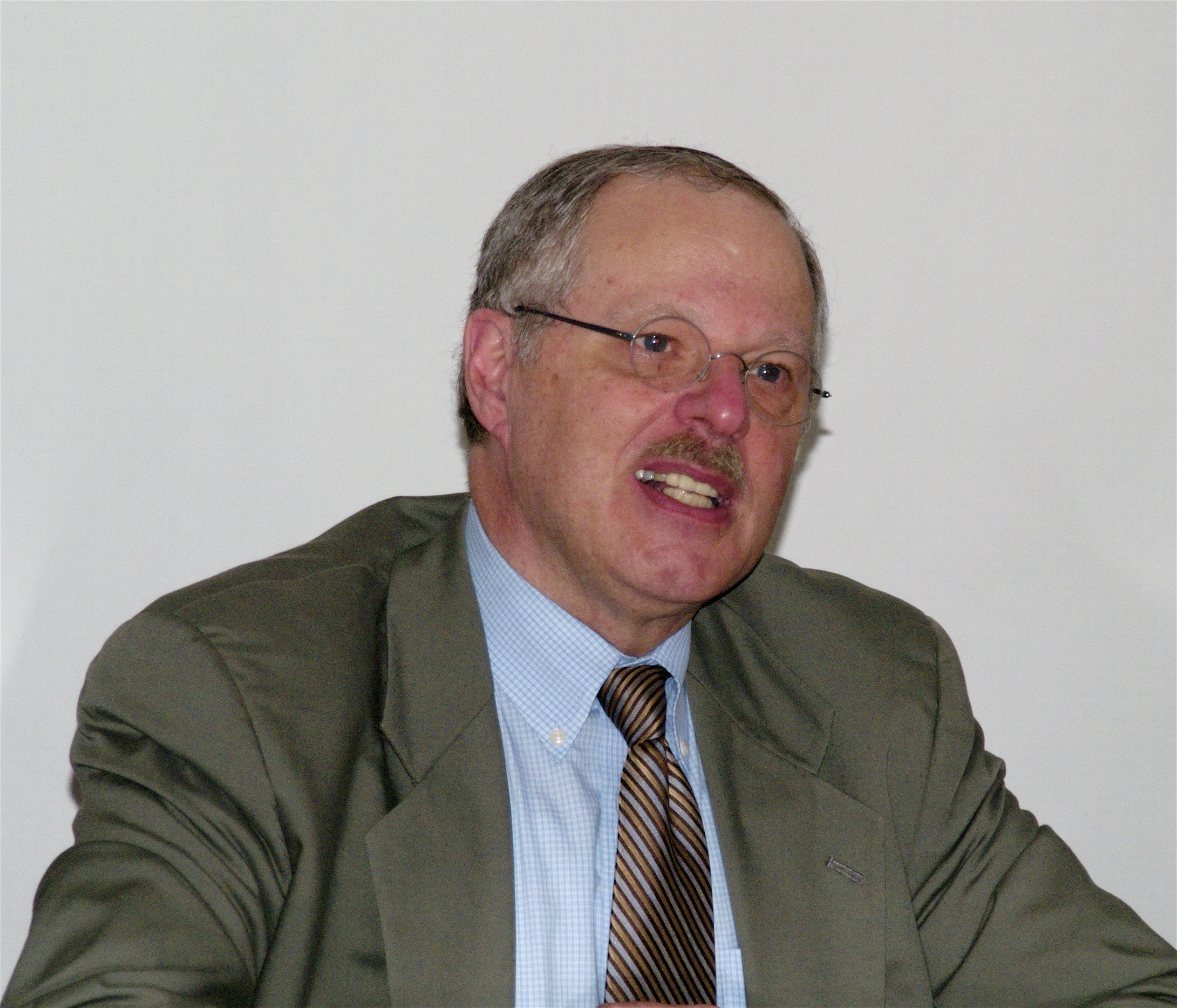
- Novak at the 30th International Congress on Law and Mental Health, 2007
- Born: August 19, 1941 (age 84); Chicago, Illinois, U.S.
- Occupations: Jewish theologian and Judaic studies professor
- Notable work: Covenantal Rights: A Study in Jewish Political Theory (Princeton University Press, 2000); Dabru Emet (2000)
- Spouse: Melva Ziman
- Children: 2
- Theological work
- Language: English
- Main interests: Ethics, biomedical ethics, Jewish theology, Jewish ethics, natural law, political theory, Jewish-Christian relations

David Novak, FRSC (born August 19, 1941) is an American Jewish theologian, ethicist, and scholar of Jewish philosophy and law (Halakha). He is an ordained Conservative rabbi and holds the J. Richard and Dorothy Shiff Chair of Jewish Studies as Professor of the Study of Religion and Professor of Philosophy at the University of Toronto since 1997. His areas of interest are Jewish theology, Jewish ethics and biomedical ethics, political theory (with a special emphasis on natural law), and Jewish–Christian relations.

Novak has authored 16 books and more than 200 articles in scholarly journals. His book Covenantal Rights: A Study in Jewish Political Theory (Princeton University Press, 2000) won the American Academy of Religion Award for "best book in constructive religious thought" in 2000. He is a regular contributor to the ABC News' Religion and Ethics portal. He frequently addresses interfaith conferences and contributes to books and journals published by Christian theologians.

== Early life and education ==
Novak was born in 1941 in Chicago, Illinois. He received his bachelor's degree from the University of Chicago in 1961 and his master's degree in Hebrew literature in 1964. He earned his Ph.D. in philosophy at Georgetown University in 1971. (Later he remarked that he chose Georgetown in part because it was a Catholic university). He received rabbinical ordination in 1966 from the Jewish Theological Seminary of America, where he studied under Abraham Joshua Heschel. He is married to Melva Ziman since 1963; they have two children and five grandchildren.

== Rabbinic career ==
Novak was a pulpit rabbi in several American Jewish communities from 1966 to 1989. He also served as a Jewish chaplain at St. Elizabeth's Hospital, National Institute of Mental Health, Washington, D.C., from 1966 to 1969.

== Academic career ==
In 1989 he moved to the University of Virginia as Edgar M. Bronfman Professor of Modern Judaic Studies, a position he held until 1997. Since 1997 he has held the J. Richard and Dorothy Shiff Chair of Jewish Studies as Professor of the Study of Religion and Professor of Philosophy at the University of Toronto. He is also a member of the Joint Centre for Bioethics. From 1997 to 2002 he also directed the Jewish Studies Programme.

In 1992–1993 he was a Fellow at the Woodrow Wilson International Center for Scholars, Washington, D.C. He also lectured at Oxford University, Lancaster University and Drew University, and was a visiting scholar at Princeton University in 2004 and 2006. In 2017, he delivered the Gifford Lectures on Athens and Jerusalem: God, Humans, and Nature at the University of Aberdeen.

== Contributions ==
=== Ethics ===
Novak has contributed to Jewish ethics by advocating a Jewish social ethics drawn from both the natural law tradition and Halakha. To this end, he interprets the rabbinic approach to the Noahide laws as a useful grounding for cross-cultural moral reasoning. His expertise includes Maimonides, John Courtney Murray, and Paul Tillich. In his theology, he combines Jewish rabbinical tradition and logic with Christian teachings.

=== Interfaith ===
Novak, together with Peter Ochs, Tikva Frymer-Kensky, and Michael Signer, drafted a full-page advertisement which appeared in the Sunday, 10 September 2000 edition of The New York Times under the title "Dabru Emet (Speak Truth): A Jewish statement on Christians and Christianity". Among the eight theological statements which the advertisement briefly laid out were: "Nazism is not a Christian phenomenon"; "Humanly irreconcilable differences between Jews and Christians will not be settled until God redeems the entire world as promised in Scripture"; and the statement which generated the most controversy in Jewish circles, "Jews and Christians worship the same God". The advertisement was signed by 160 rabbis, including many leading Reform, Reconstructionist and Conservative thinkers and a handful of Orthodox rabbis known for their interfaith work. Explaining his rationale for publishing the document, Novak told J. The Jewish News of Northern California: "I want Jewish readers to clearly realize that Christians are not necessarily our enemies. Quite the contrary, they can be very good friends to Jews and Judaism". The document was subsequently translated into eight languages.

Novak suggests that there are three degrees by which Christians can maintain respect for the covenant of the Jews mentioned in Jeremiah.

1. The new covenant is an extension of the old covenant.
2. The new covenant is an addition to the old covenant.
3. The new covenant is a replacement for the old covenant.

He observes, "In the early Church, it seems, the new covenant presented by the Apostolic Writings (better known as diatheke ekaine or novum testamentum) was either taken to be an addition to the old covenant (the religion of the Torah and Jewish Pharisaic tradition), or it was taken to be a replacement for the old covenant."

Novak considers both understandings to be supersessionist. He designates the first as "soft supersessionism" and the second as "hard supersessionism." The former "does not assert that God terminated the covenant of Exodus-Sinai with the Jewish people. Rather, it asserts that Jesus came to fulfill the promise of the old covenant, first for those Jews already initiated into the covenant, who then accepted his messiahhood as that covenant's fulfillment. And, it asserts that Jesus came to both initiate and fulfill the promise of the covenant for those Gentiles whose sole connection to the covenant is through him. Hence, in this kind of supersessionism, those Jews who do not accept Jesus' messiahhood are still part of the covenant in the sense of 'what God has put together let no man put asunder' [emphasis original]." See also Dual-covenant theology.

Hard supersessionism, on the other hand, asserts that "[t]he old covenant is dead. The Jews by their sins, most prominently their sin of rejecting Jesus as the Messiah, have forfeited any covenantal status." The hard supersessionists base their views on the bible passages found in Matthew 21:42–46 and Romans 9:1–7. This classification provides mutually exclusive options. Hard supersessionism implies both punitive and economic supersessionism; soft supersessionism does not fall into any of the three classes recognized as supersessionist by Christian theologians; instead it is associated with Jewish Christianity.

== Public lectures ==
In 2001, Novak delivered the fifteenth Erasmus Lecture, titled Jews, Christians, and Civil Society, organized by First Things magazine and the Institute on Religion and Public Life. In his address, Novak examined the theological and moral foundations of public life shared by Jews and Christians, arguing that both traditions contribute indispensable resources for sustaining a just and humane civil society. The lecture reflected his long-standing engagement with Jewish-Christian dialogue and the intersection of faith and ethics in modern pluralistic democracies.

Another named lecture was to deliver the Gifford Lectures (Aberdeen, 2017).

== Other activities ==
He is a founder, vice-president, and coordinator of the Jewish Law Panel of the Union for Traditional Judaism, and a faculty member and vice-president of the Union for Traditional Judaism in Teaneck, New Jersey. He is a faculty member of the Department of Talmud and Halakha at the Canadian Yeshiva & Rabbinical School, Toronto. He also serves as a Visitor of Ralston College.

In the mid-1980s he was invited to join the Institute on Religion and Public Life by its founder, Richard John Neuhaus, and became a member of the editorial board of the institute's journal, First Things. He is also a member of the advisory board of The G.K. Chesterton Institute for Faith & Culture at Seton Hall University, South Orange, New Jersey.

In 2006 he was appointed as a board member of Assisted Human Reproduction Canada.

== Published works ==
- Law and Theology in Judaism (Volumes I and II). New York: Ktav Publishing House. 1974. (Vol. 1 foreword by Louis Finkelstein)
- Suicide and Morality: The theories of Plato, Aquinas, and Kant and their relevance for suicidology. Scholars Studies Press. 1975. ISBN 9780685690796.
- The Image of the Non-Jew in Judaism: A historical and constructive study of the Noahide Laws. New York: E. Mellen Press. 1983.
- Violence in our society : some Jewish insights. New York: Jewish Communal Affairs Dept., American Jewish Committee. 1983. ISBN 9780874950526.
- Halakhah in a Theological Dimension. Scholars Press. 1985. ISBN 9780891307570..
- Jewish-Christian Dialogue: A Jewish justification. Oxford University Press. 1989. ISBN 0-19-507273-1.
- The Theology of Nahmanides Systematically Presented. Scholars Press. 1992. ISBN 1-55540-802-8.
- Jewish Social Ethics. Oxford University Press. 1992. ISBN 0-19-506924-2.
- The Election of Israel: The idea of the Chosen People. New York: Cambridge University Press. 1995. ISBN 0-521-41690-6.
- Leo Strauss and Judaism: Jerusalem and Athens critically revisited. Rowman & Littlefield Publishers, Inc. 1996. ISBN 0-8476-8146-7.
- Natural Law in Judaism. New York: Cambridge University Press. 1998. ISBN 0-521-63170-X.
- Covenantal Rights: A study in Jewish political theory. Princeton University Press. 2000. ISBN 1-4008-0576-7.
- The Jewish Social Contract: An essay in political theology. Princeton University Press. 2005. ISBN 0-691-12210-5.
- Talking With Christians: Musings of a Jewish theologian. Wm. B. Eerdsman Publishing Co. 2005. ISBN 0-8028-2842-6.
- The Sanctity of Human Life. Washington, D.C.: Georgetown University Press. 2007. ISBN 978-1-58901-176-2.
- Tradition in the Public Square: A David Novak Reader. Wm. B. Eerdmans Publishing Company. 2008. ISBN 978-0-8028-3072-2.
- In Defense of Religious Liberty. ISI Books. 2009. ISBN 978-1-933859-75-0.
- Emon, Anver M.; Levering, Matthew; Novak, David (2014). Natural law : a Jewish, Christian, and Islamic trialogue. Oxford, United Kingdom: Oxford University Press. ISBN 9780198706601.
- Zionism and Judaism : a new theory. Cambridge: Cambridge University Press. 2015. ISBN 978-1316256367.
- Jewish justice : the contested limits of nature, law, and covenant. Waco, Texas: Baylor University Press. 2017. ISBN 9781481305297.
- God-talk : the heart of Judaism. Lanham, Maryland: Rowman & Littlefield Publishers. 2024. ISBN 9781538187135.

=== Selected articles ===
- Jewish-Christian Relations in a Secular Age. The Swig Judaic Studies Program at the University of San Francisco. 1998.
- Maimonides on Judaism and Other Religions. Hebrew Union College Press. 1997.
- After Twenty-Five Years: Jewish-Christian relations since the Second Vatican Council's Nostra aetate, "On the relation of the church to non-Christian religions" : Symposium papers. St. Michael's College. 1990. (with John Pawlikowski and Paul Matthews Van Buren)
- Novak, David (December 2003). "A Jewish argument for socialized medicine". Kennedy Institute of Ethics Journal. 13 (4): 313–328. doi:10.1353/ken.2004.0009. PMID 15049296.
- Homosexuality: A Case Study in Jewish Ethics (with Elliot N. Dorff and Aaron L. Mackler). Journal of the Society of Christian Ethics 28 (2008): 225–35.
- Shorter articles in Sh'ma: A Journal of Jewish Responsibility include:
  - Concerning Physician Assisted Suicide, Vol.21/no.420 1991
  - Jew, Yes; Gentile, Yes; Quasi-Jew, No, Vol.18/no.346 1988
  - Yes to Halakhah Means No to Women Rabbis, Vol.9/no.166 1979
