= Relationships between Jewish religious movements =

The relationships between the various denominations of Judaism are complex and include a range of trends from the conciliatory and welcoming to hostile and antagonistic.

== Orthodox Judaism ==
The essential position of Orthodox Judaism is the view that Conservative and Reform Judaism made major and unjustifiable breaks with historic Judaism—both by their skepticism of the verbal revelation of the Written Torah and the Oral Torah, and by their rejection of Halakha (Jewish law) as binding (although to varying degrees). It views religious pluralism as a construct of the liberal movements, and does not see their ideology as rooted in historic Jewish norms. While not recognizing Reform and Conservative as valid expressions of Judaism, it recognizes most who are affiliated with these movements as full-fledged Jews, aside from those whose Judaism is of patrilineal descent or who were converted under Conservative or Reform auspices. When dealing with the individual, Moshe Feinstein is famously quoted as characterizing all current-day non-Orthodox Jews as tinok shenishba—literally, "captured children"—in a category analogous to Jewish children captured by non-Jews who were never taught Judaism, meaning that they do not act out of wrong intent or motives, but out of ignorance and poor upbringing (Iggeroth Moshe).

However, when dealing with the movement/philosophy, they perceive the generation of other denominations to have historically been engendered by heretical intent and the 1800s widespread denigration of religion. They view Reform Judaism, Reconstructionist Judaism, and Conservative Judaism as heretical, less observant Jewish movements. As such, Orthodox authorities have strongly fought attempts by the Reform and Conservative movements to gain official recognition and denominational legitimacy in Israel. Haredi groups and authorities will not work with non-Orthodox religious movements in any way, as they view this as lending legitimacy to those movements. The members of those movements who have been born of a Jewish mother are, however, still regarded as Jews.

=== Modern Orthodox views ===
In his 1964 responsum on relations with non-Orthodox Judaism, Rabbi Joseph B. Soloveitchik developed the intellectual foundations for the way Modern Orthodox Judaism was to approach the issue in subsequent decades. Soloveitchik developed the idea that Jews have historically been linked together by two distinct covenants. One is the brit yi'ud (covenant of destiny), the covenant by which Jews are bound together through their adherence to Halakha. The second is the brit goral (covenant of fate), which is the desire and willingness to be part of a people chosen by God to live a sacred mission in the world, and the fact that all those who live in this covenant share the same fate of persecution and oppression, even if they do not live by Halakha. Soloveitchik held that non-Orthodox Jews were in violation of the covenant of destiny; yet, they are still bound together with Orthodox Jews in the covenant of fate. This approach permitted cooperation in matters involving the covenant of fate, while recognizing differences and limits based on the covenant of destiny.

Following this lead, until the 1970s, the Modern Orthodox and the non-Orthodox movements worked together in the now-defunct Synagogue Council of America. However, the relationship between Modern Orthodoxy and the non-Orthodox movements has worsened over the last few decades. The movements have seen a polarization of views. Haredi Judaism has seen a great resurgence in its popularity, and many formerly Modern Orthodox rabbis have been swayed to some degree by their views. Non-Orthodox movements have progressively moved to the left theologically and halakhically. Reform Judaism rejected the traditional definition of a Jew via matrilineal descent, effectively severing the conventional view of Jewish peoplehood that had linked Reform and non-Reform movements. For practically all Orthodox Jews (and many Conservative Jews), this was seen as splitting the Jewish people into two mutually incompatible groups. The confluence of these two phenomena helped drive most of Modern Orthodoxy further to the right, and effectively ended all official cooperation between Modern Orthodoxy and all of the non-Orthodox denominations.

Some within the Orthodox world advocate that while non-Orthodox forms of Judaism are incorrect, they nonetheless have functional validity and spiritual dignity. Rabbi Norman Lamm writes:

...Reform, Conservative, and Reconstructionist communities are not only more numerous in their official memberships than the Orthodox community, but they are also vital, powerful, and dynamic; they are committed to Jewish survival, each according to its own lights; they are a part of Klal Yisrael; and they consider their rabbis their leaders. From a functional point of view, therefore, non-Orthodox rabbis are valid leaders of Jewish religious communities, and it is both fatuous and self-defeating not to acknowledge this openly and draw the necessary consequences - for example, establishing friendly and harmonious and respectful relationships and working together, all of us, towards those Jewish communal and global goals that we share and that unite us inextricably and indissolubly.... ...non-Orthodox rabbis and laypeople may possess spiritual dignity. If they are sincere, if they believe in God, if they are motivated by principle, and not by convenience or trendiness, if they endeavor to carry out the consequences of their faith in a consistent manner—then they are religious people.... But neither functional validity nor spiritual dignity are identical with Jewish legitimacy. "Validity" derives from the Latin validus, strong. It is a factual, descriptive term. "Legitimacy" derives from the Latin lex, law. It is a normative and evaluative term.

A number of Modern Orthodox rabbis advocate good relations with their non-Orthodox peers. In 1982, Tradition: A Journal of Orthodox Jewish Thought published a symposium on the state of Orthodox Judaism that included contributions by many leading Orthodox rabbis. The first question the editor asked the rabbis was: "Do you believe that recent developments warrant the triumphalism exhibited by segments of Orthodoxy which predict the total disappearance of non-Orthodox movements?" Rabbi Marc D. Angel replied, "We should be frightened by the possibility. With all our theological differences, yet we are part of one Jewish people and work together in so many ways for the benefit of the Jewish community... It is not a happy prospect that the overwhelming majority of American Jews will lose their Jewishness. It is also unlikely that the vast numbers of the non-Orthodox community will move into Orthodoxy in the relatively near future." Rabbi David Berger replied, "I confess that I would not look forward to such a disappearance.... The Jewish loyalties and observances of non-Orthodox Jews are decidedly better than nothing.... The only weakening of Conservatism and Reform for which Orthodoxy can legitimately hope would come through conversion to Orthodoxy. No such development appears imminent in statistically significant numbers." The message of other rabbis rings a similar note; no rabbis profiled in the symposium believed that most non-Orthodox Jews would ever convert to Orthodoxy. Thus, Orthodoxy should work together on some issues with non-Orthodox Judaism, and it is far better for Jews to be members of non-Orthodox Judaism than to assimilate and not be religious Jews at all.

A small number of modern Orthodox rabbis regularly cooperate with non-Orthodox rabbis through smaller organizations such as CLAL (The National Jewish Center for Learning and Leadership) and the New York Board of Rabbis.

Some American Modern Orthodox rabbis created a new modern Orthodox advocacy group called Edah, which included members of the Rabbinical Council of America. Edah's mission statement stated: "The Vision of Edah is an Orthodox Jewish community in which we, as members, leaders, and institutions ... reach out to and interact with Jews of all the movements as well as non-affiliated Jews as an expression of the wholeness of, and in an effort to strengthen, the entire Jewish people."

== Conservative views ==
Conservative Judaism holds that Orthodox Judaism is a valid and legitimate form of normative Rabbinic Judaism and respects the validity of its rabbis. Conservative Judaism holds that both Reform and Reconstructionist Judaism have made major and unjustifiable breaks with historic Judaism by their rejection of the normativity of Halakha and redefinition of Jewishness (e.g., the conferral of Jewishness by patrilineal descent). Despite this disagreement, Conservative Judaism respects the right of Reform and Reconstructionist Jews to interpret Judaism in their own way(s). The Conservative movement recognizes the right of Jews to form denominations and acknowledges the ordination of Reform and Reconstructionist rabbis, but generally does not accept their decisions as valid. For example, since the Central Conference of American Rabbis passed their 1983 resolution to recognize patrilineal descent, the Conservative movement has not accepted Reform converts to Judaism as Jews, requiring them to convert through Conservative batei din. Conservative denominational leadership has since agreed to recognize Reform converts who complete necessary rituals (i.e., appearing before a beth din and immersing in a mikveh) and a full "introduction to Judaism" course without inquiring regarding the status of the sponsoring rabbi or deciding beth din.

While respecting the validity of Orthodox rabbis, the Conservative movement believes that Orthodoxy has deviated from historical Judaism by insisting on the halakhic principle of binding legal precedent, particularly concerning relatively recent codifications of Jewish law. A prominent Conservative spokesman has written:

Reform has asserted the right of interpretation but it rejected the authority of legal tradition. Orthodoxy has clung fast to the principle of authority, but has in our own and recent generations rejected the right to any but minor interpretations. The Conservative view is that both are necessary for a living Judaism. Accordingly, Conservative Judaism holds itself bound by the Jewish legal tradition, but asserts the right of its rabbinical body, acting as a whole, to interpret and to apply Jewish law.

— Mordecai Waxman, Tradition and Change: The Development of Conservative Judaism

The Conservative movement, however, has clashed with Orthodoxy over its refusal to recognize the Conservative and Reform movements as legitimate, and in February 1997, Rabbi Ismar Schorsch, the then-chancellor of the Jewish Theological Seminary of America, claimed that Orthodox organizations in Israel politically discriminate against non-Orthodox Jews, and called on Reform and Conservative Jews, as well as the Jewish Federations of North America, to stop funding Orthodox organizations and institutions that disagree with the Conservative view of pluralism. Several weeks later, at the movement's annual Rabbinical Assembly conference in Boston, he called for the disintegration of the Chief Rabbinate of Israel and its network of courts.

== Reform views ==
Reform Judaism espouses the notion of religious pluralism, advocating that most Jewish denominations—including Orthodoxy and the Conservative movement—are valid expressions of Judaism. Historically, however, the Reform view of Orthodox Judaism had been negative. Early battles between Reform and Orthodox groups in Germany for control of communal leadership were fierce. Reform viewed Orthodoxy as overly focused on tradition and a literal interpretation of scripture that conflicted with modern science. Relations with the Conservative movement are much more cordial (although the two split due to such affairs as the Trefa Banquet), and Conservative and Reform leaders cooperate on many areas of mutual concern.

== Humanistic views ==
Humanistic Judaism views other forms of Judaism as valid from a traditional point of view, but emphasizes Jewish culture and history, rather than belief in God, as the sources of Jewish identity.

== Karaite views ==
Karaite Judaism does not recognize the Oral Law as a divine authority, maintaining that the Written Torah, and the subsequent prophets which God sent to Israel, whose writings are recorded in the Tanakh, are the only suitable sources for deriving halakha, which Karaite Judaism maintains, must not deviate from the plain meaning of the Hebrew Bible. Rabbinic laws which either allow Jews something the Torah forbids, or release Jews from a commandment the Torah requires, are seen as a break with the Torah, and transgression of Divine Law. An example being the white tzitzit donned by Rabbinic Jews, which has no tekhelet. This is regarded as a violation of the Torah, which requires that tzitzit be made with tekhelet. The tzitzit worn by some in the rabbinic community, which does have tekhelet, is also seen as a violation of the Torah, because according to the Talmud, a tekhelet string must be made of wool, and the white strings from linen, making the tzitzit shatnez. Karaite Jews also maintain that Rabbinic Jews are not observing Jewish holy days on their correct date, because the dates are fixed according to the pre-calculated Hillel II calendar, instead of beginning each month with the sighting of the New Moon from the horizon of Israel, and starting the year during the month when the barley reaches the stage of Aviv in the land of Israel. However, despite Rabbinic Judaism deviating from the plain meaning of the Torah, Karaite Jews recognize Rabbinic Jews who have unbroken patrilineal Jewish descent, as Jewish, and eligible to join Karaite Judaism without a conversion.

== See also ==
- Jewish religious movements
- Jewish schisms
- Who is a Jew?
- Heresy in Judaism
