= Religion in Israel =

Religion in Israel (2016)
1. Judaism–Hiloni (33.1%)
2. Judaism–Masorti (24.3%)
3. Judaism–Dati (8.80%)
4. Judaism–Haredi (7.30%)
5. Islam (18.1%)
6. Christianity (1.90%)
7. Druze (1.60%)
8. Others and unclassified (4.80%)

Religion in Israel is manifested primarily in Judaism, the ethnic religion of the Jewish people. The State of Israel declares itself as a "Jewish and democratic state" and is the only country with a Jewish-majority population (see Jewish state). Other faiths in the country include Islam (predominantly Sunni), Christianity (mostly Melkite and Orthodox) and the religion of the Druze people. Religion plays a central role in national and civil life, and almost all Israeli citizens are automatically registered as members of the state's 14 official religious communities, which exercise control over several matters of personal status, especially marriage. These recognized communities are Orthodox Judaism (administered by the Chief Rabbinate), Islam (administered by the Supreme Muslim Council), the Druze faith (local Druze are led by spiritual leaders from the Tarif family), the Catholic Church (including the Latin Church, Armenian Catholic Church, Antiochene Syriac Maronite Church, Melkite Greek Catholic Church, Syriac Catholic Church, and Chaldean Catholic Church), Greek Orthodox Church of Jerusalem, Syriac Orthodox Church, Armenian Apostolic Church, Episcopal Church in Jerusalem and the Middle East, and the Baháʼí Faith (administered by the Universal House of Justice)..

The religious affiliation of the Israeli population as of 2022 was 73.6% Jewish, 18.1% Muslim, 1.9% Christian, and 1.6% Druze. The remaining 4.8% included faiths such as Samaritanism and Baháʼí, as well as "religiously unclassified".

While Israeli Jews are all technically under the jurisdiction of the state Orthodox rabbinate, personal attitudes vary immensely, from extreme Orthodoxy to irreligion and atheism. Jews in Israel mainly classify themselves along a fourfold axis, from least to most observant, hiloni (lit. 'secular'); masorti (lit. 'traditional'); dati (lit. 'religious' or 'orthodox', including religious zionist); and haredi (lit. 'ultra-religious' or 'ultra-orthodox').

Israeli law guarantees considerable privileges and freedom to practice for the recognized communities, but, in tandem, does not necessarily do so for other faiths. The Pew Research Center has identified Israel as one of the countries that place "high restrictions" on the free exercise of religion and there have been limits placed on non-Orthodox Jewish religious movements, which are unrecognized. Pew ranked Israel as fifth globally in terms of "inter-religious tension and violence".

== Religious self-definition ==
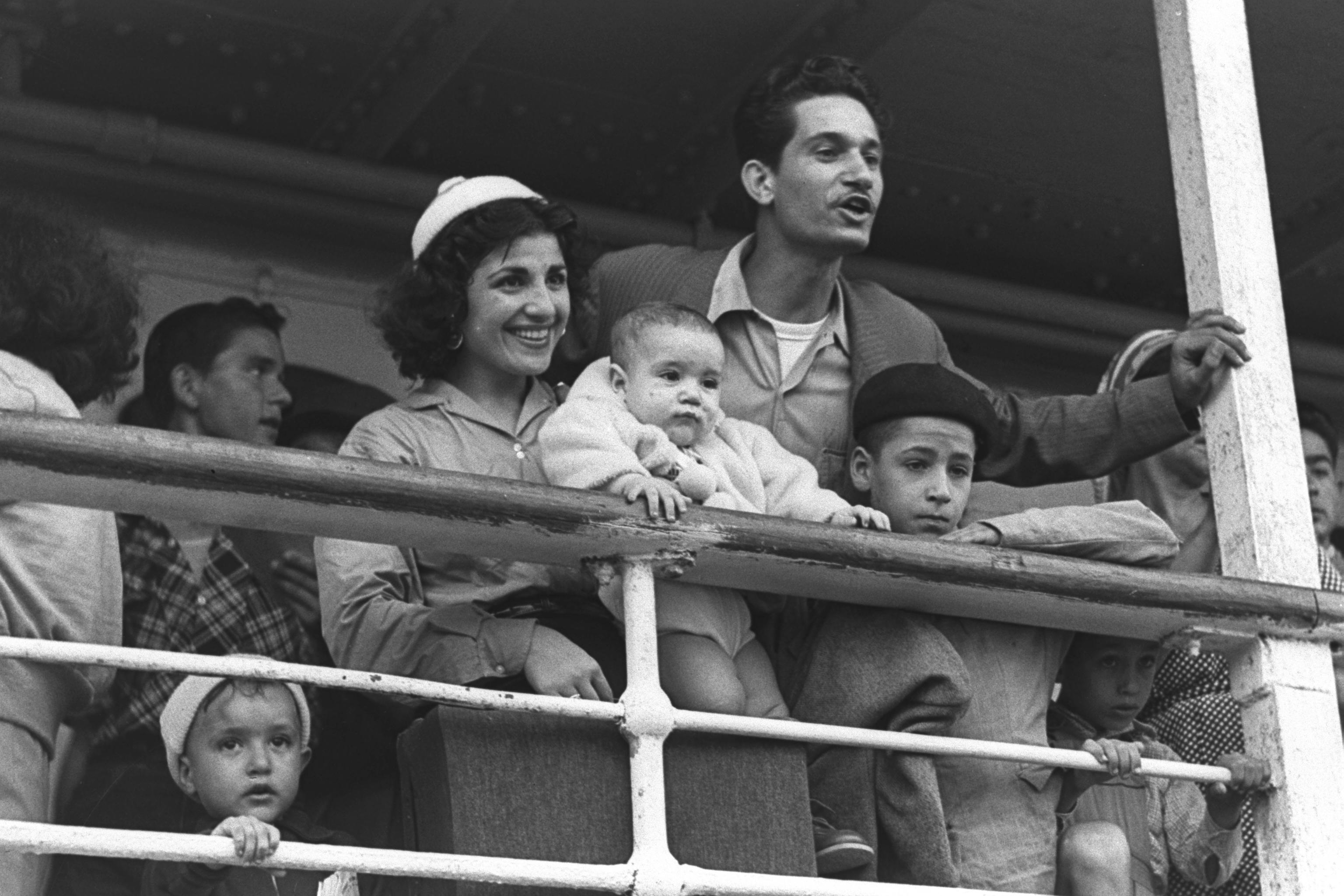
Moroccan Jewish immigrants arriving in Israel under the Law of Return, 1954

A Gallup survey in 2015 determined that 65% of Israelis say they are either "not religious" or "convinced atheists", while 30% say they are "religious". Israel is in the middle of the international religiosity scale, between Thailand, the world's most religious country, and China, the least religious.

As of 1999, 65% of Israeli Jews believed in God, and 85% participated in a Passover seder. A survey conducted in 2009 showed that 80% of Israeli Jews believed in God, with 46% of them self-reporting as secular. Israelis' majority (2/3) tend not to align themselves with Jewish religious movements (such as Reform Judaism or Conservative Judaism), but instead tend to define their religious affiliation by degree of their religious practice.

As of 2009, 42% of Israeli Jews defined themselves as "secular"; on the other opposite, 8% defined themselves as haredi (ultra-orthodox); an additional 12% as "religious"; 13% as "traditional (religious)"; and 25% as "traditional (non-religious)".

In 2022, 45% of Israel Jews self-identified as "secular"; 10% as haredi (ultra-orthodox); 33% as masorti (lit. 'traditional'); and 12% as dati (lit. 'religious' or 'orthodox', including religious zionist).

Of the Arab Israelis, as of 2008, 82.7% were Muslims, 8.4% were Druze, and 8.3% were Christians. Just over 80% of Christians are Arabs, and the majority of the remaining are immigrants from the former Soviet Union who immigrated with a Jewish relative. About 81% of Christian births are to Arab women.

Among the Arab population, a 2010 research showed that 8% defined themselves as very religious, 47% as religious, 27% as not very religious, and 18% as not religious.

== Judaism ==
Most citizens in the State of Israel are Jewish. As of 2022, Jews made up 73.6% percent of the population.

=== Secular-traditional spectrum ===
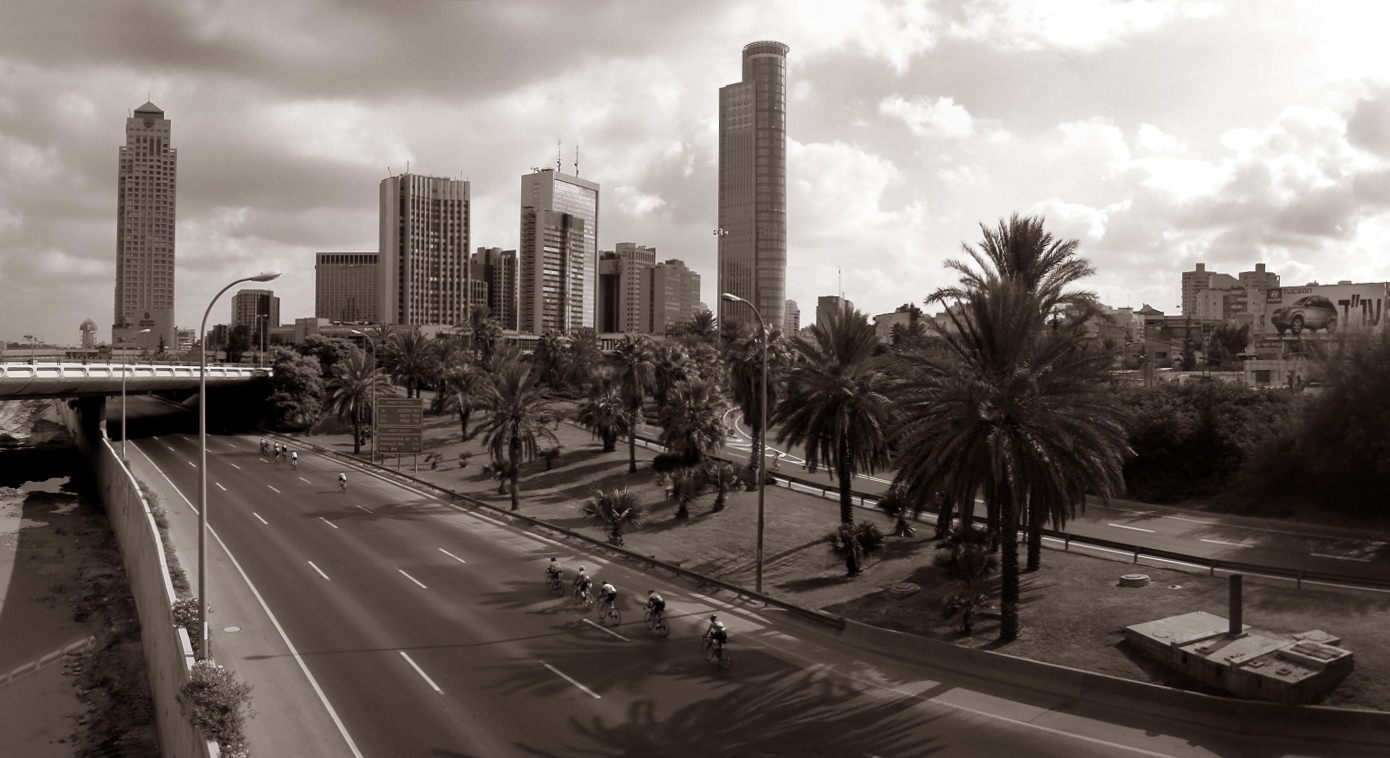
Cyclists ride down the deserted Ayalon Highway in the city of Tel Aviv on Yom Kippur.

In 2007, a poll by the Israeli Democracy Institute found that 27% of Israeli Jews say that they keep the Sabbath, while 53% said they do not keep it at all. The poll also found that 50% of the respondents would give up shopping on the Sabbath as long as public transportation were kept running and leisure activities continued to be permitted; however, only 38% believed that such a compromise would reduce the tensions between the secular and religious communities.

Because the terms "secular" (hiloni) and "traditional" (masorti) are not strictly defined, published estimates of the percentage of Israeli Jews who are considered "traditional" range from 32% to 55%. A Gallup survey in 2015 determined that 65% of Israelis say they are either "not religious" or "convinced atheists", while 30% say they are "religious". Israel is in the middle of the international religiosity scale, between Thailand, the world's most religious country, and China, the least religious. The Israeli Democracy Index commissioned in 2013 by the Israel Democracy Institute regarding religious affiliation with religious movements of Israeli Jews found that 3.9 percent of respondents felt attached to Reform (Progressive) Judaism, 3.2 percent to Conservative Judaism, and 26.5 percent to Orthodox Judaism. The other two thirds of respondents said they felt no connection to any denomination, or declined to respond. However, it does not mean, that the secular/hiloni Israelis are without other forms of spirituality.

There is also a growing baal teshuva (Jewish returners) movement, involved with all Jewish denominations, of secular Israelis rejecting their previously secular lifestyles and choosing to become religiously observant, with many educational programs and yeshivas for them. An example is Aish HaTorah, which received open encouragement from some sectors within the Israeli establishment.

At the same time, there is also a significant movement in the opposite direction toward a secular lifestyle. There is some debate which trend is stronger at present. Recent polls show that ranks of secular Jewish minority in Israel continued to drop in 2009. Currently, the secular make up only 42%.

=== Orthodox spectrum ===
"Tehillim neged Tilim" (transl. 'Psalms against missiles') Hebrew slogan initially coined during the First Gulf War in response to Iraqi rocket attacks on Israel in 1991, and turned into a popular slogan-sticker ever since, especially among the Israeli Religious Zionism and Haredi Judaism communities.

The spectrum covered by "Orthodox" in the diaspora exists in Israel, again with some important variations.

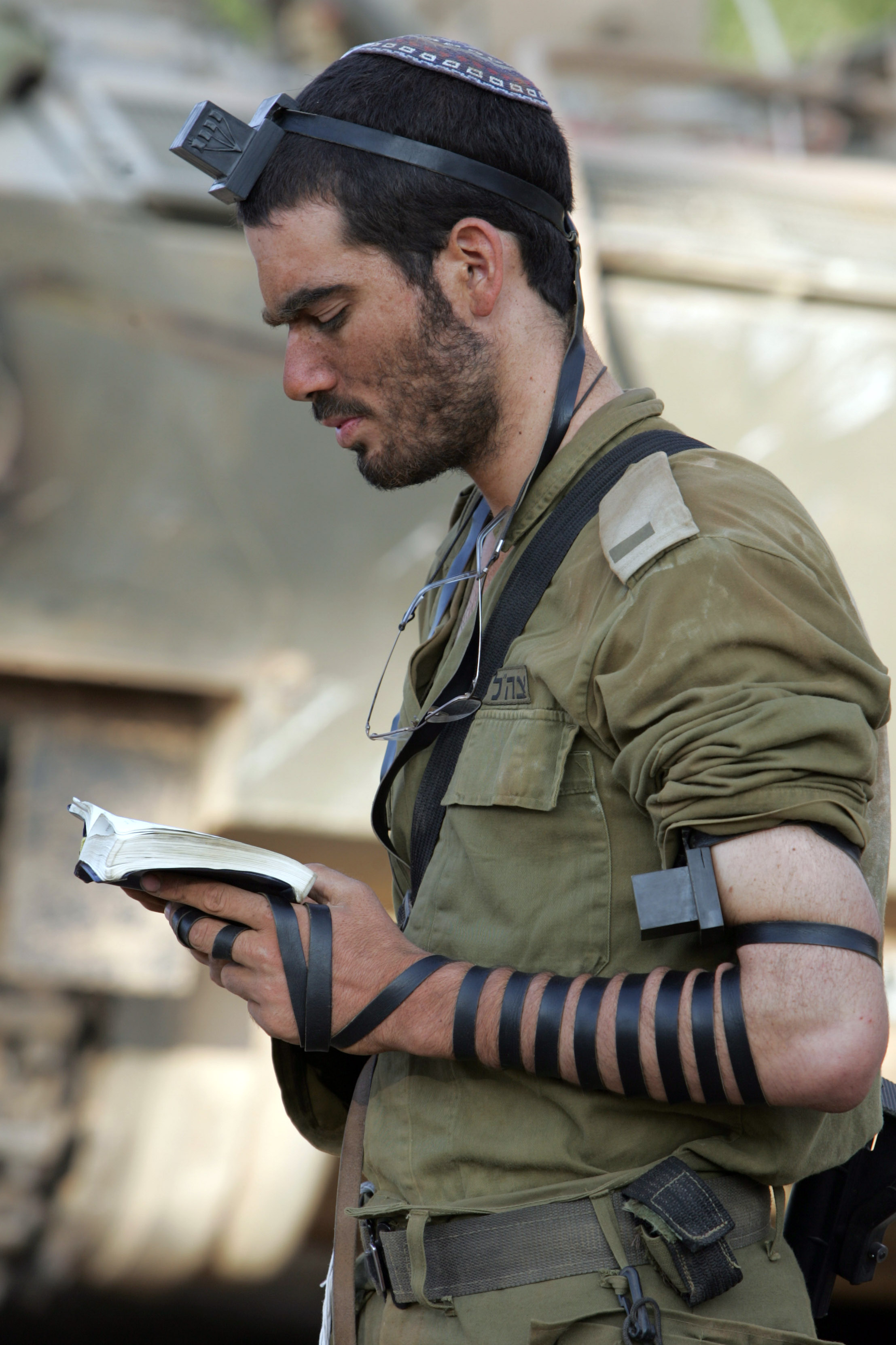
IDF soldier, Asael Lubotzky, prays with tefillin.

What would be called "Orthodox" in the diaspora includes what is commonly called dati ("religious") or Haredi ("ultra-Orthodox") in Israel. The former term includes what is called Religious Zionism or the "National Religious" community (and also Modern Orthodox in US terms), as well as what has become known over the past decade or so as Hardal (Haredi-Leumi, i. e., "ultra-Orthodox nationalist"), which combines a largely Haredi lifestyle with a nationalist (i. e., pro-Zionist) ideology.

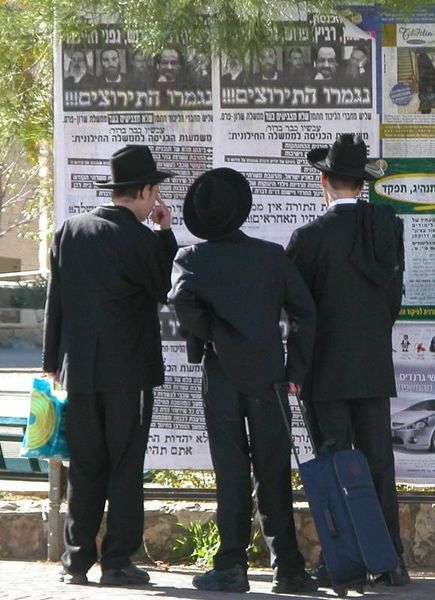
Haredi Jews in Jerusalem, 2004

Haredi applies to a populace that can be roughly divided into three separate groups, except mentioned Hardal, along both ethnic and ideological lines: (1) "Lithuanian/Lita'im" Haredim of Ashkenazic (i. e., "Germanic" — European) origin, predominantly, adherents of non-Hasidic traditional Orthodoxy, a.k.a. Misnagdim; (2) Hasidic Haredim of Ashkenazic (mostly of Eastern European) origin; and (3) Sephardi Haredim (including mizrahi).

Ultra-Orthodox sector is relatively young and numbered in 2020 more than 1,1 million (14 percent of total population).

=== Non-Orthodox denominations of Judaism ===
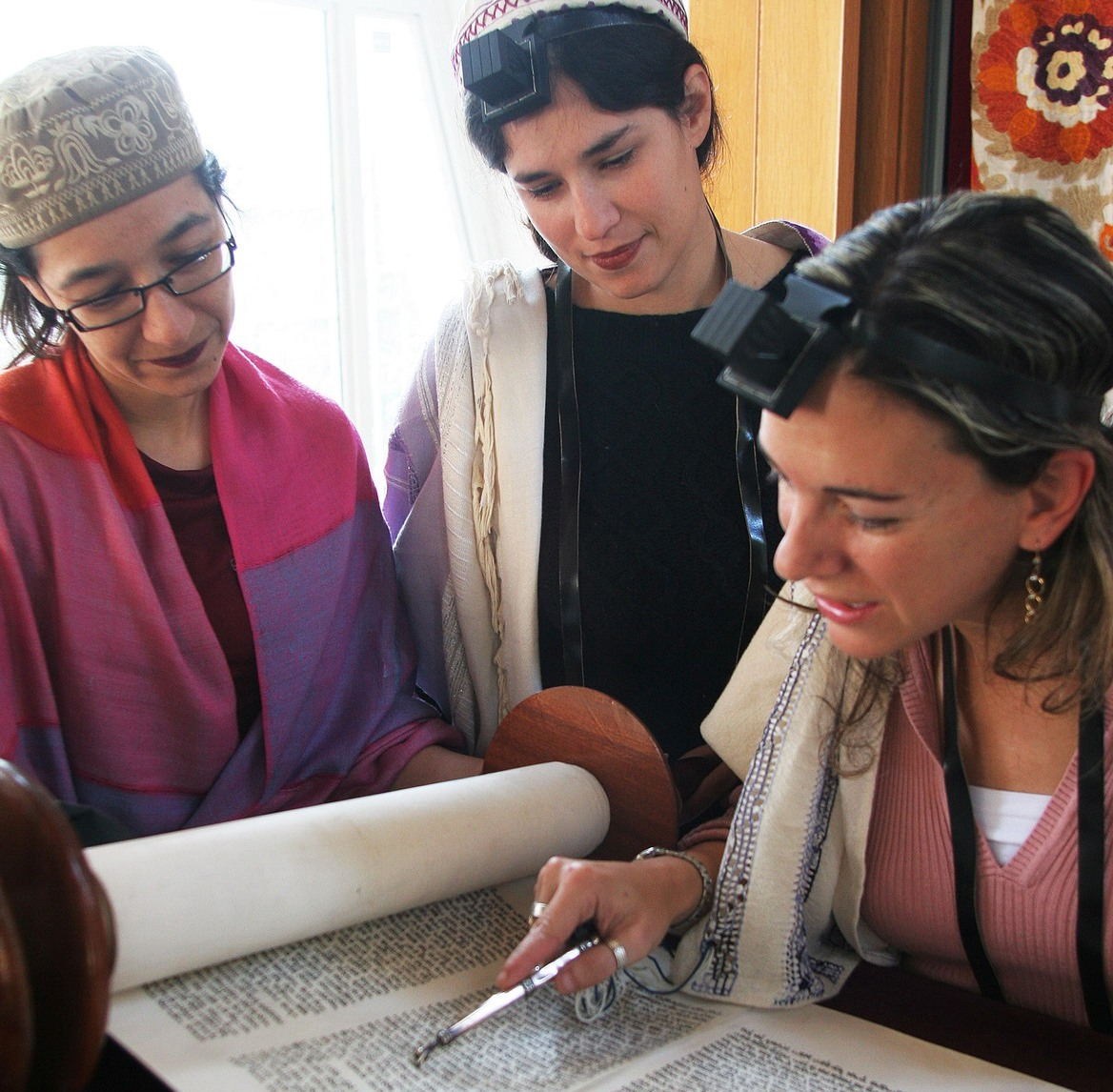
Israeli Conservative women rabbis

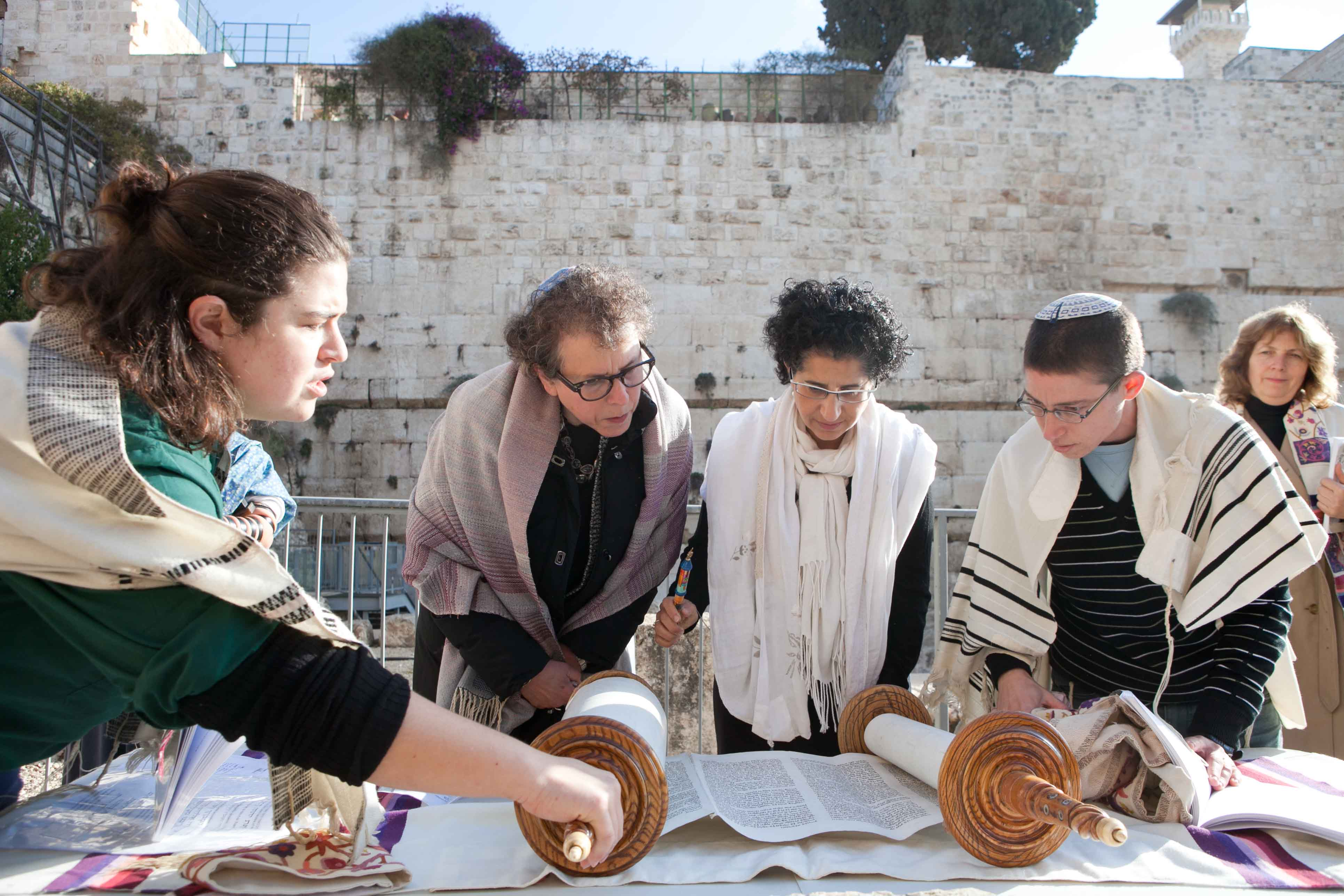
WoW Torah Reading in Jerusalem with Anat Hoffman (right) looking on, 2012

Conservative, Reform (the Israel Movement for Reform and Progressive Judaism), Reconstructionist, Humanistic Judaism (the International Institute for Secular Humanistic Judaism) and other new non-Orthodox Jewish religious movements are represented among Israeli Jews. According to The Israel Democracy Institute, as of 2013, approximately 7 percent of Israel's Jewish population "identified" with Reform and Conservative Judaism, a study by Pew Research Center showed 5% did, while a Midgam survey showed that one third "especially identified with Progressive Judaism", almost as many as those who especially identify with Orthodox Judaism. Only a few authors, like Elliot Nelson Dorff, consider the Israeli social group masortim (traditionalists) to be one and the same with the Western Conservative (masorti) movement, it produces understanding Conservative Judaism as a major denomination in Israel, associated with a large social sector.

The Chief Rabbinate strongly opposes the Reform and Conservative movements, saying they are "uprooting Judaism", that they cause assimilation and that they have “no connection” to authentic Judaism. The chief rabbinate's view does not reflect the majority viewpoint of Israeli Jews, however. A survey of Israeli Jews published in May 2016 showed that 72 percent of respondents said they disagreed with the Haredi assertions that Reform Jews are not really Jewish. The survey also showed that a third of Israeli Jews "identify" with progressive (Reform or Conservative) Judaism and almost two thirds agree that Reform Judaism should have equal rights in Israel with Orthodox Judaism. The report was organized by the Israel Movement for Reform and Progressive Judaism ahead of its 52nd biennial conference.

=== Secular–religious status quo ===
The religious status quo, agreed to by David Ben-Gurion with the Orthodox parties at the time of Israel's formation in 1948, is an agreement on the role that Judaism would play in Israel's government and the judicial system. The agreement was based upon a letter sent by Ben-Gurion to Agudat Israel dated 19 June 1947. Under this agreement, which still operates in most respects today:

- The Chief Rabbinate has authority over kashrut, Shabbat, Jewish burial and personal status issues, such as marriage, divorce, and conversions.
- Streets in Haredi neighborhoods are closed to traffic on the Jewish Sabbath.
- There is no public transport on the Jewish Sabbath, and most businesses are closed. However, there is public transport in Haifa, since Haifa had a large Arab population at the time of the British Mandate.
- Restaurants who wish to advertise themselves as kosher must be certified by the Chief Rabbinate.
- Importation of non-kosher foods is prohibited. Despite this prohibition, a few pork farms supply establishments selling white meat, due to demand therefore among specific population sectors, particularly the Russian immigrants of the 1990s. Despite the status quo, the Supreme Court ruled in 2004 that local governments are not allowed to ban the sale of pork, although this had previously been a common by-law.

Nevertheless, some breaches of the status quo have become prevalent, such as several suburban malls remaining open during the Sabbath. Though this is contrary to the law, the government largely turns a blind eye.

While the state of Israel enables freedom of religion for all of its citizens, it does not enable civil marriage. The state forbids and disapproves of any civil marriages or non-religious divorces performed amongst within the country. Because of this, some Israelis choose to marry outside of Israel. Many parts of the "status quo" have been challenged by secular Israelis regarding the Chief Rabbinate's strict control over Jewish weddings, Jewish divorce proceedings, conversions, and the question of who is a Jew for the purposes of immigration.

The Ministry of Education manages the secular and Orthodox school networks of various faiths in parallel, with a limited degree of independence and a common core curriculum.

In recent years, perceived frustration with the status quo among the secular population has strengthened parties such as Shinui, which advocate separation of religion and state, without much success so far.

Today the secular Israeli Jews claim that they are not religious and do not observe Jewish law, and that Israel as a democratic modern country should not force the observance thereof upon its citizens against their will. The Orthodox Israeli Jews claim that the separation between state and religion will contribute to the end of Israel's Jewish identity.

Signs of the first challenge to the status quo came in 1977, with the fall of the Labor government that had been in power since independence, and the formation of a right-wing coalition under Menachem Begin. Right-wing Revisionist Zionism had always been more acceptable to the Orthodox parties, since it did not share the same history of anti-religious rhetoric that marked socialist Zionism. Furthermore, Begin needed the Haredi members of the Knesset (Israel's unicameral parliament) to form his coalition, and offered more power and benefits to their community than what they had been accustomed to receiving, including a lifting of the numerical limit on military exemptions for those engaged in full-time Torah study.

On the other hand, secular Israelis began questioning whether a "status quo" based on the conditions of the 1940s and 1950s was still relevant in the 1980s and 1990s, and reckoned that they had cultural and institutional support to enable them to change it regardless of its relevance. They challenged Orthodox control of personal affairs such as marriage and divorce, resented the lack of entertainment and transportation options on the Jewish Sabbath (then the country's only day of rest), and questioned whether the burden of military service was being shared equitably, since the 400 scholars who originally benefited from the exemption, had grown to 50,000. Finally, the Progressive and Conservative communities, though still small, began to exert themselves as an alternative to the Haredi control of religious issues. No one was happy with the "status quo"; the Orthodox used their newfound political force to attempt to extend religious control, and the non-Orthodox sought to reduce or even eliminate it.

=== Chief Rabbinate ===
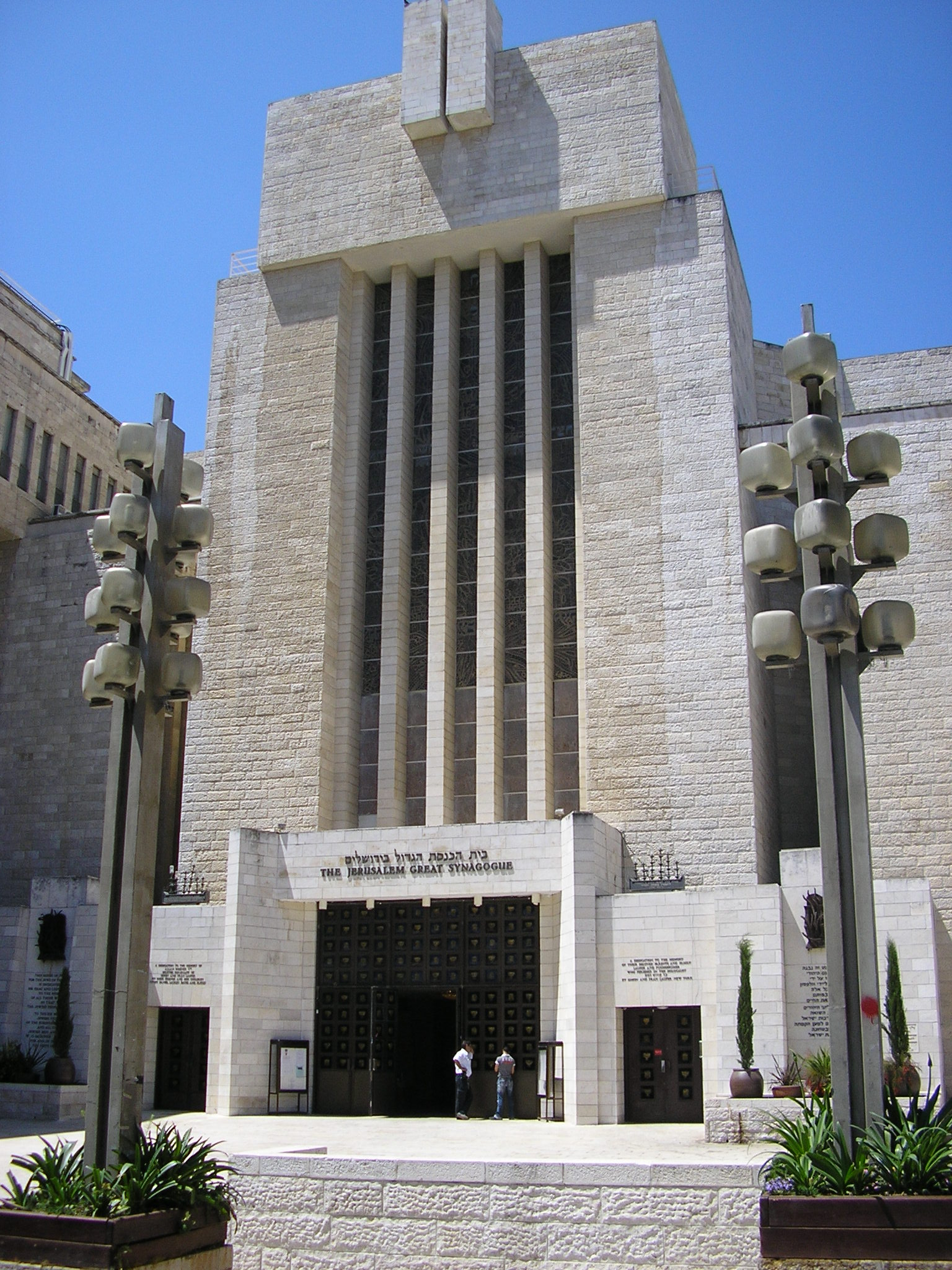
Great Synagogue in Jerusalem, which serves as the seat of the Chief Rabbinate

It was during the British Mandate of Palestine that the British administration established an official dual Ashkenazi-Sephardi "Chief Rabbinate" (rabbanut harashit) that was exclusively Orthodox, as part of an effort to consolidate and organize Jewish life based on its own model in Britain, which encouraged strict loyalty to the British crown, and in order to attempt to influence the religious life of the Jews in Palestine in a similar fashion. In 1921, Rabbi Abraham Isaac Kook (1864–1935) was chosen as the first Ashkenazi Chief Rabbi and Rabbi Jacob Meir as the first Sephardi Chief Rabbi (Rishon LeTzion). Rabbi Kook was a leading light of the religious Zionist movement, and was acknowledged by all as a great rabbi of his generation. He believed that the work of secular Jews toward creating an eventual Jewish state in Eretz Yisrael was part of a divine plan for the settlement of the land of Israel. The return to Israel was in Kook's view not merely a political phenomenon to save Jews from persecution, but an event of extraordinary historical and theological significance.

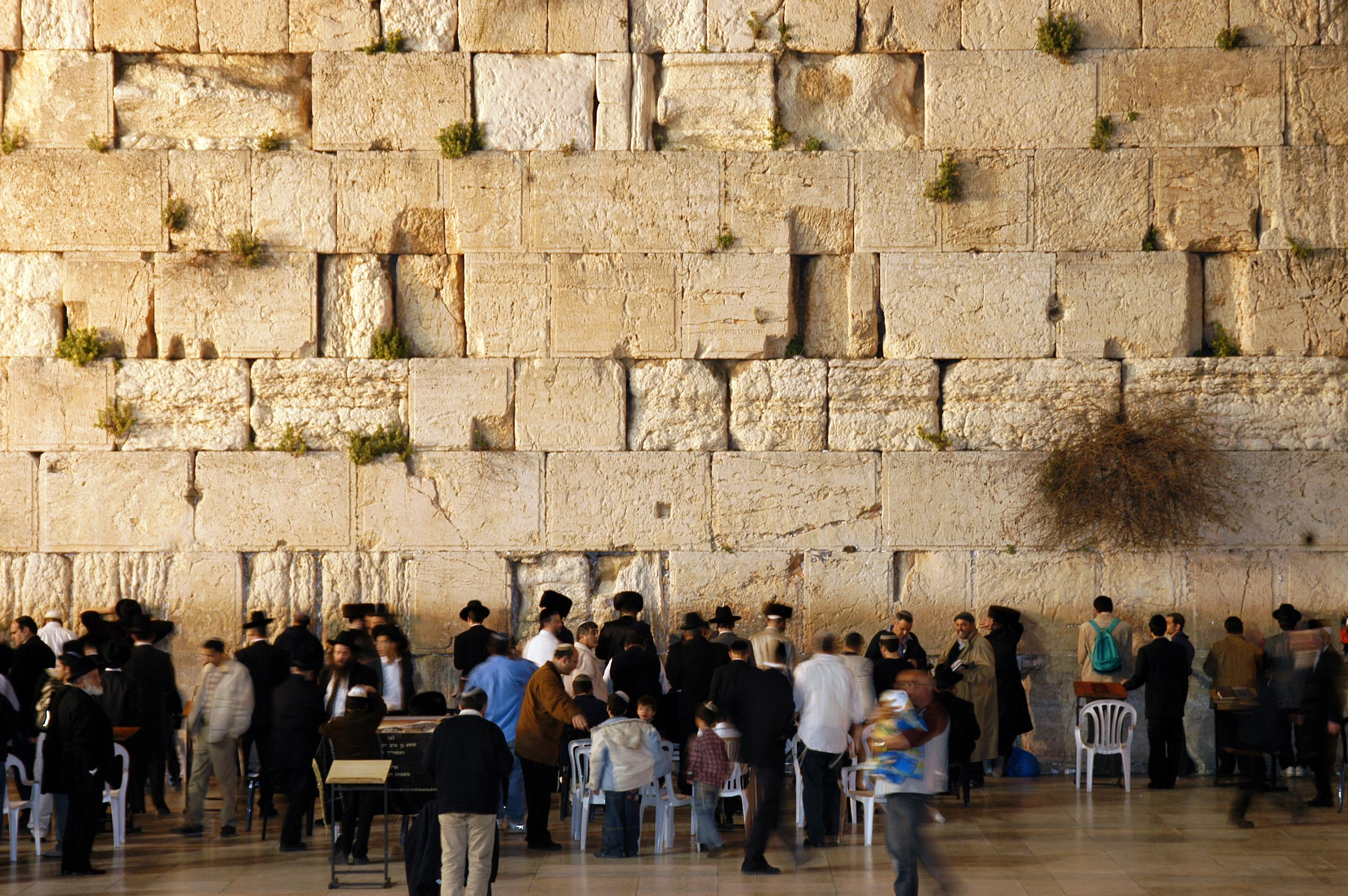
The Western Wall is under the supervision of the Chief Rabbinate of Israel.

Prior to the 1917 British conquest of Palestine, the Ottomans had recognized the leading rabbis of the Old Yishuv as the official leaders of the small Jewish community that for many centuries consisted mostly of the devoutly Orthodox Jews from Eastern Europe as well as those from the Levant who had made aliyah to the Holy Land, primarily for religious reasons. The European immigrants had unified themselves in an organization initially known as the Vaad Ha'ir, which later changed its name to Edah HaChareidis. The Turks viewed the local rabbis of Palestine as extensions of their own Orthodox Hakham Bashis ("[Turkish] Chief Rabbi/s") who were loyal to the Sultan.

Thus the centrality of an Orthodox dominated Chief Rabbinate became part of the new state of Israel as well when it was established in 1948. Based in its central offices at Heichal Shlomo in Jerusalem the Israeli Chief rabbinate has continued to wield exclusive control over all the Jewish religious aspects of the secular state of Israel. Through a complex system of "advice and consent" from a variety of senior rabbis and influential politicians, each Israeli city and town also gets to elect its own local Orthodox Chief Rabbi who is looked up to by substantial regional and even national religious and even non-religious Israeli Jews.

Through a national network of Batei Din ("religious courts"), each headed only by approved Orthodox Av Beit Din judges, as well as a network of "Religious Councils" that are part of each municipality, the Israeli Chief Rabbinate retains exclusive control and has the final say in the state about virtually all matters pertaining to conversion to Judaism, the Kosher certification of foods, the status of Jewish marriages and divorces, and monitoring and acting when called upon to supervise the observance of some laws relating to Shabbat observance, Passover (particularly when issues concerning the sale or ownership of Chametz come up), the observance of the Sabbatical year and the Jubilee year in the agricultural sphere.

The Israel Defense Forces also relies on the Chief Rabbinate's approval for its own Jewish chaplains who are exclusively Orthodox. The IDF has a number of units that cater to the unique religious requirements of the Religious Zionist yeshiva students through the Hesder program of combined alternating military service and yeshiva studies over several years.

A poll conducted by the Israel Democracy Institute in April and May 2014 of which institutions were most and least trusted by Israeli citizens showed that Israelis have little trust in the religious establishment. When asked which public institutions they most trusted, the Chief Rabbinate at 29% was one of the least trusted.

=== Karaite Judaism ===
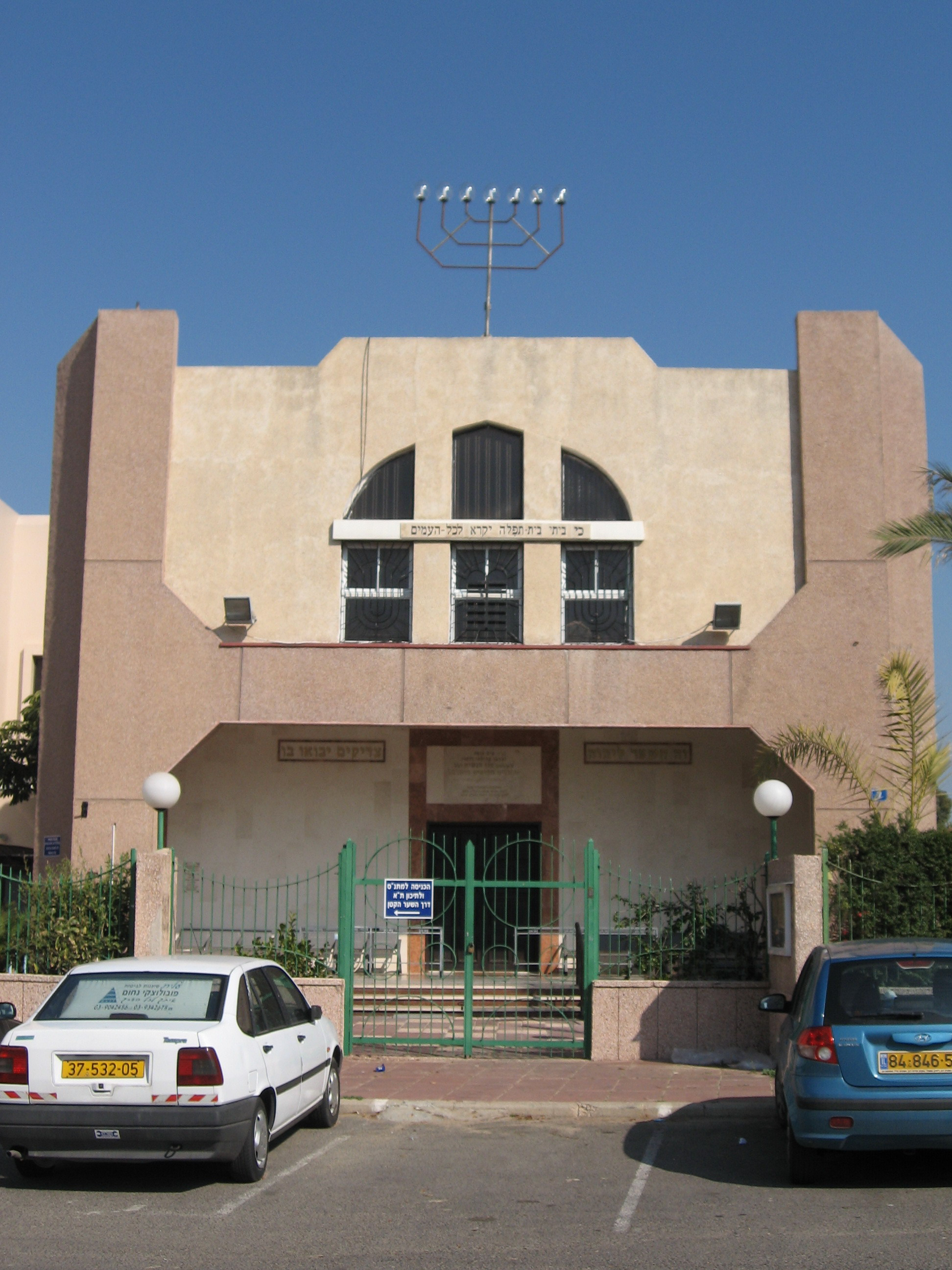
Karaite Synagogue in Ashdod

The Karaites are an ancient Jewish community that practices a form of Judaism distinct from Rabbinical Judaism, dating ostensibly to between the 7th and 9th centuries based on textual evidence, though they claim a tradition at least as old as other forms of Judaism with some tracing their origins to the Masoretes and the Sadducees. Once making up a significant proportion of the Jewish population, they are now an extreme minority compared to Rabbinical Judaism. Nearly the entirety of their population, between 30,000 and 50,000, currently live in Israel, and reside mainly in Ramla, Ashdod and Beer-Sheva. There are an estimated 10,000 additional Karaites living elsewhere around the world, mainly in the United States, Turkey, Poland, and elsewhere in Europe.

=== Conversion process ===
On 7 December 2016, the chief rabbis of Israel issued a new policy requiring that foreign Jewish converts be recognized in Israel, and vowed to release criteria required for recognizing rabbis who perform such conversions. Previously, such conversions were not required to be recognized. However, within one week the chief rabbis had retracted their earlier promise and instead appointed members to a joint committee of five rabbis who would formulate the conversion criteria.

== Religious minorities ==
=== Islam ===
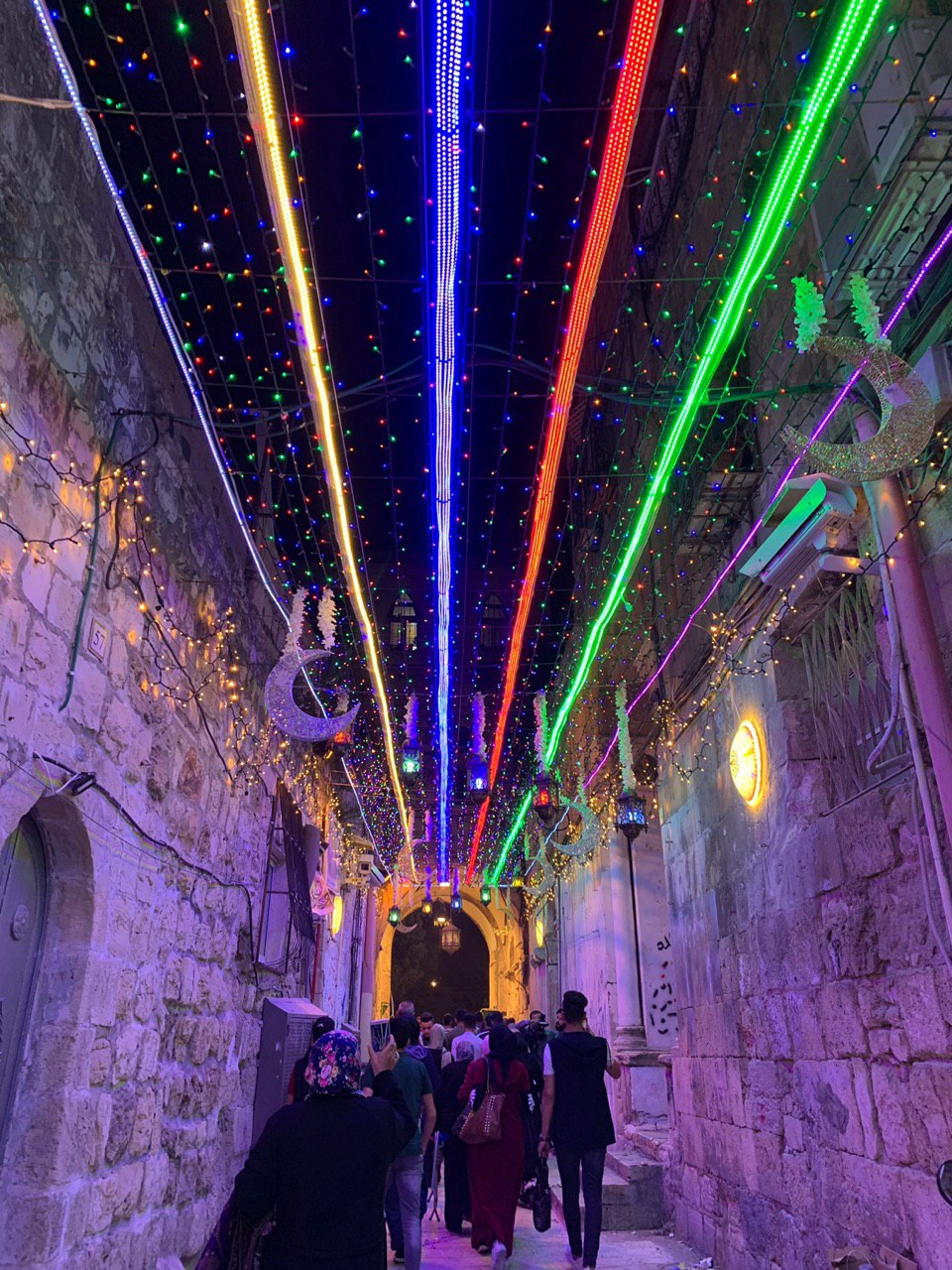
Ramadan decorations in Jerusalem

Jerusalem is a city of major religious significance for Muslims worldwide. After capturing the Old City of Jerusalem in 1967, Israel found itself in control of Mount Moriah, which was the site of both Jewish temples and Islam's third holiest site, after those in Mecca and Medina in Saudi Arabia: The Haram al Sharif (Temple Mount) from which Muslims believe that Mohammad ascended to Heaven. This mountain, which has the Dome of the Rock and the adjacent Jami Al-Aqsa on it, is the third-holiest site in Islam (and the holiest in Judaism). Since 1967, the Israeli government has granted authority to a Waqf to administer the area. Rumors that the Israeli government are seeking to demolish the Muslim sites have angered Muslims. These beliefs are possibly related to excavations that have been taking place close to the Temple Mount, with the intention of gathering archeological remnants of the first and second temple period, as well as the stance of some rabbis and activists who call for its destruction to replace it with the Third Temple.

Most Muslims in Israel are Sunni Arabs with a small minority of Ahmadi Arabs. From 1516 to 1917, the Sunni Ottoman Turks ruled the areas that now include Israel. Their rulership reinforced and ensured the centrality and importance of Islam as the dominant religion in the region. The conquest of Palestine by the British in 1917 and the subsequent Balfour Declaration opened the gates for the arrival of large numbers of Jews in Palestine who began to tip the scales in favor of Judaism with the passing of each decade. However, the British transferred the symbolic Islamic governance of the land to the Hashemites based in Jordan, and not to the House of Saud. The Hashemites thus became the official guardians of the Islamic holy places of Jerusalem and the areas around it, particularly strong when Jordan controlled the West Bank (1948–1967).

In 1922 the British had created the Supreme Muslim Council in the British Mandate of Palestine and appointed Amin al-Husayni (1895–1974) as the Grand Mufti of Jerusalem. The council was disbanded by Jordan in 1951. Israeli Muslims are free to teach Islam to their children in their own schools, and there are a number of Islamic universities and colleges in Israel and the territories. Islamic law remains the law for concerns relating to, for example, marriage, divorce, inheritance and other family matters relating to Muslims, without the need for formal recognition arrangements of the kind extended to the main Christian churches. Similarly Ottoman law, in the form of the Mecelle, for a long time remained the basis of large parts of Israeli law, for example concerning land ownership.

==== Ahmadiyya ====
Ahmadiyya is a small Islamic sect in Israel. The history of the Ahmadiyya Muslim Community in Israel begins with a tour of the Middle East in 1924 made by the second caliph of the Community Mirza Basheer-ud-Din Mahmood Ahmad and a number of missionaries. However, the Community was first established in the region in 1928, in what was then the British Mandate of Palestine. The first converts to the movement belonged to the Odeh tribe who originated from Ni'lin, a small village near Jerusalem. In the 1950s they settled in Kababir, a former village which was later absorbed by the city of Haifa. The neighbourhood's first mosque was built in 1931, and a larger one, called the Mahmood Mosque, in the 1980s. Israel is the only country in the Middle East where Ahmadi Muslims can openly practice their Islamic faith. As such, Kababir, a neighbourhood on Mount Carmel in Haifa, Israel, acts as the Middle Eastern headquarters of the Community. It is unknown how many Israeli Ahmadis there are, although it is estimated there are about 2,200 Ahmadis in Kababir.

=== Christianity ===
Most Christians living permanently in Israel are Arabs, or have come from other countries to live and work mainly in churches or monasteries, which have long and enduring histories in the land. Ten churches are officially recognized under Israel's confessional system, which provides for the self-regulation of status issues, such as marriage and divorce. These are the Catholic Church (including the Latin Church, Armenian Catholic Church, Antiochene Syriac Maronite Church, Melkite Greek Catholic Church, Syriac Catholic Church, and Chaldean Catholic Church), Greek Orthodox Church of Jerusalem, Syriac Orthodox Church, Armenian Apostolic Church, Episcopal Church in Jerusalem and the Middle East.

Christian Arabs are one of the most educated groups in Israel. Maariv has described the Christian-Arab sector as "the most successful in the education system", since Christian Arabs fared the best in terms of education in comparison to any other group receiving an education in Israel. Arab Christians were also the vanguard in terms of eligibility for higher education, and they have attained bachelor's and academic degrees at higher rates than Jews, Druze or Muslims in Israel.

There is also a small community of Hebrew Catholics, or Hebrew-speaking converts from Judaism to Catholicism. In 2003, a Patriarchal Vicar was appointed for the first time by the Vatican to oversee the Hebrew Catholic community in Israel.

According to historical and traditional sources, Jesus lived in the Land of Israel, and died and was buried on the site of the Church of the Holy Sepulchre in Jerusalem, making the land a Holy Land for Christianity. However, few Christians now live in the area, compared to Muslims and Jews. This is because Islam displaced Christianity in almost all of the Middle East, and the rise of modern Zionism and the establishment of the State of Israel has seen millions of Jews migrate to Israel. Recently, the Christian population in Israel has increased with the immigration of foreign workers from a number of countries, and the immigration of accompanying non-Jewish spouses in mixed marriages. Numerous churches have opened in Tel Aviv.

==== Eastern Orthodox and Catholic churches ====
Most Christians in Israel belong primarily to branches of the Eastern Orthodox and Catholic Churches that oversee a variety of church buildings, monasteries, seminaries, and religious institutions all over the land, particularly in Jerusalem.

==== Protestants ====
Protestant Christians account for less than one percent of Israeli citizens, but foreign evangelical Protestants are a prominent source of political support for the State of Israel (see Christian Zionism). Each year hundreds of thousands of Protestant Christians come as tourists to see Israel.

==== Messianic Judaism ====
The Messianic Seal of Jerusalem, a symbol of Messianic Judaism

Messianic Judaism is a religious movement that arose within Evangelical Protestantism and incorporates elements of Judaism with the tenets of Christianity. They worship God the Father as one with Trinity. They worship Jesus, whom they call "Yeshua". Messianic Jews believe that Jesus is the Messiah. They emphasise that Jesus was a Jew, as were his early followers. Most adherents in Israel reject traditional Christianity and its symbols, in favour of celebrating Jewish festivals. Although followers of Messianic Judaism are not considered Jews under Israel's Law of Return, there are an estimated 10,000–20,000 adherents in the State of Israel, both Jews and other non-Arab Israelis, many of them recent immigrants from the former Soviet Union. In Jerusalem, there are twelve Messianic congregations. This is growing religious group in Israel, according to both its proponents and critics. In Israel Jewish Christians themselves, go by the name Meshiykhiyyim (from Messiah, as found in the Franz Delitzsch Hebrew New Testament) rather than the traditional Talmudic name for Christians Notzrim (from Nazarene).

=== Druze ===
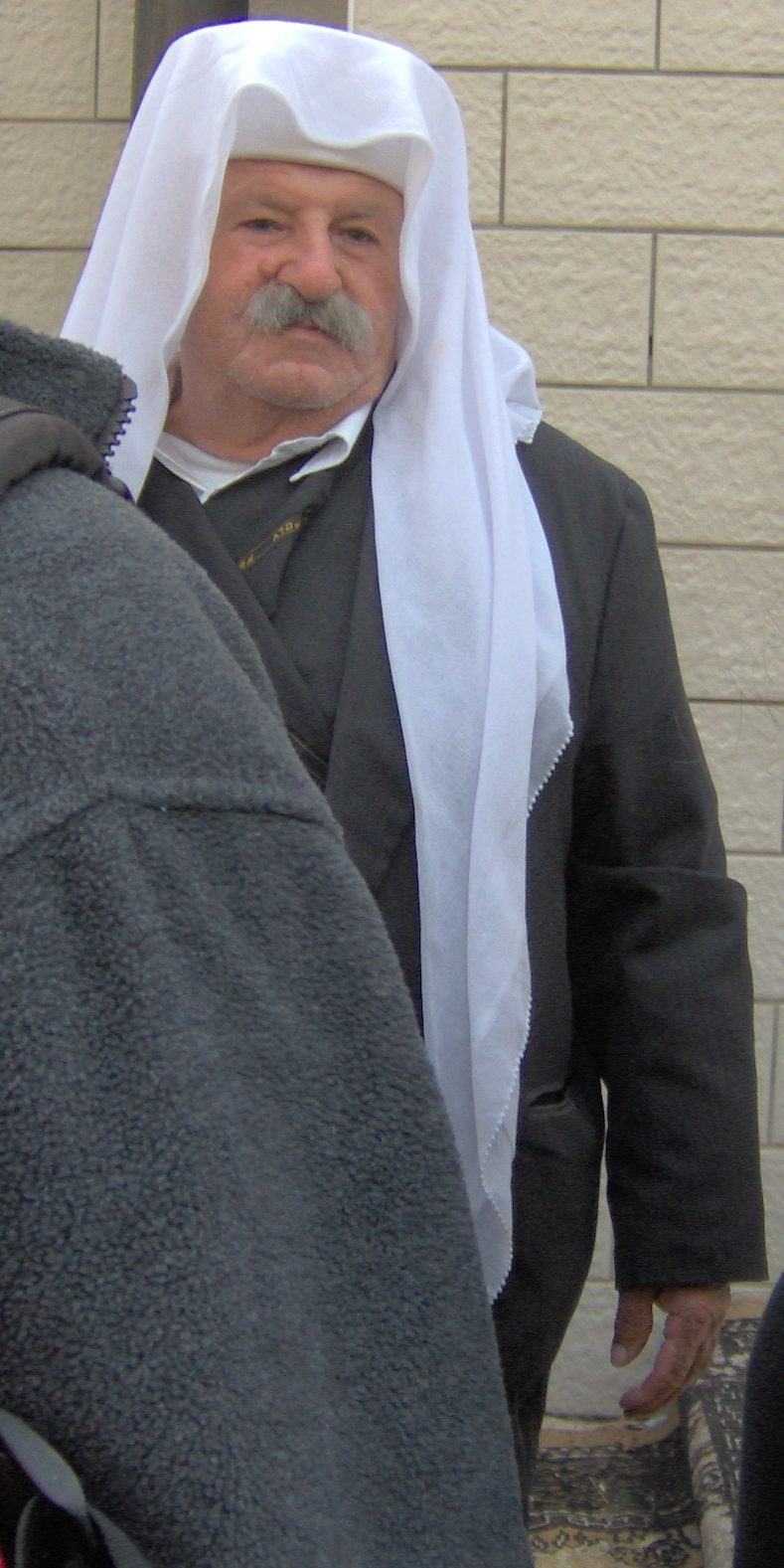
Druze man in Peki'in

Israel is home to about 143,000 Druze who follow their own gnostic religion. Self-described as Ahl al-Tawḥīd and al-Muwaḥḥidūn (meaning "People of Oneness" and "Unitarians", respectively), the Druze live mainly in the Northern District, southern Haifa District, and northern occupied Golan Heights. Since 1957, the Israeli government has also designated the Druze a distinct ethnic community, at the request of the community's leaders. Until his death in 1993, the Druze community in Israel was led by Shaykh Amin Tarif, a charismatic figure regarded by many within the Druze community internationally as the preeminent religious leader of his time. Although the Druze faith developed from the Ismāʿīli branch of Shı̄‘ā Islam, Druze do not identify as Muslims, and they do not accept the five pillars of Islam. The sixth Fātimid caliph, Al-Ḥākim Bi-Amr Allāh, is a central figure in the Druze faith.

=== Baháʼí Faith ===
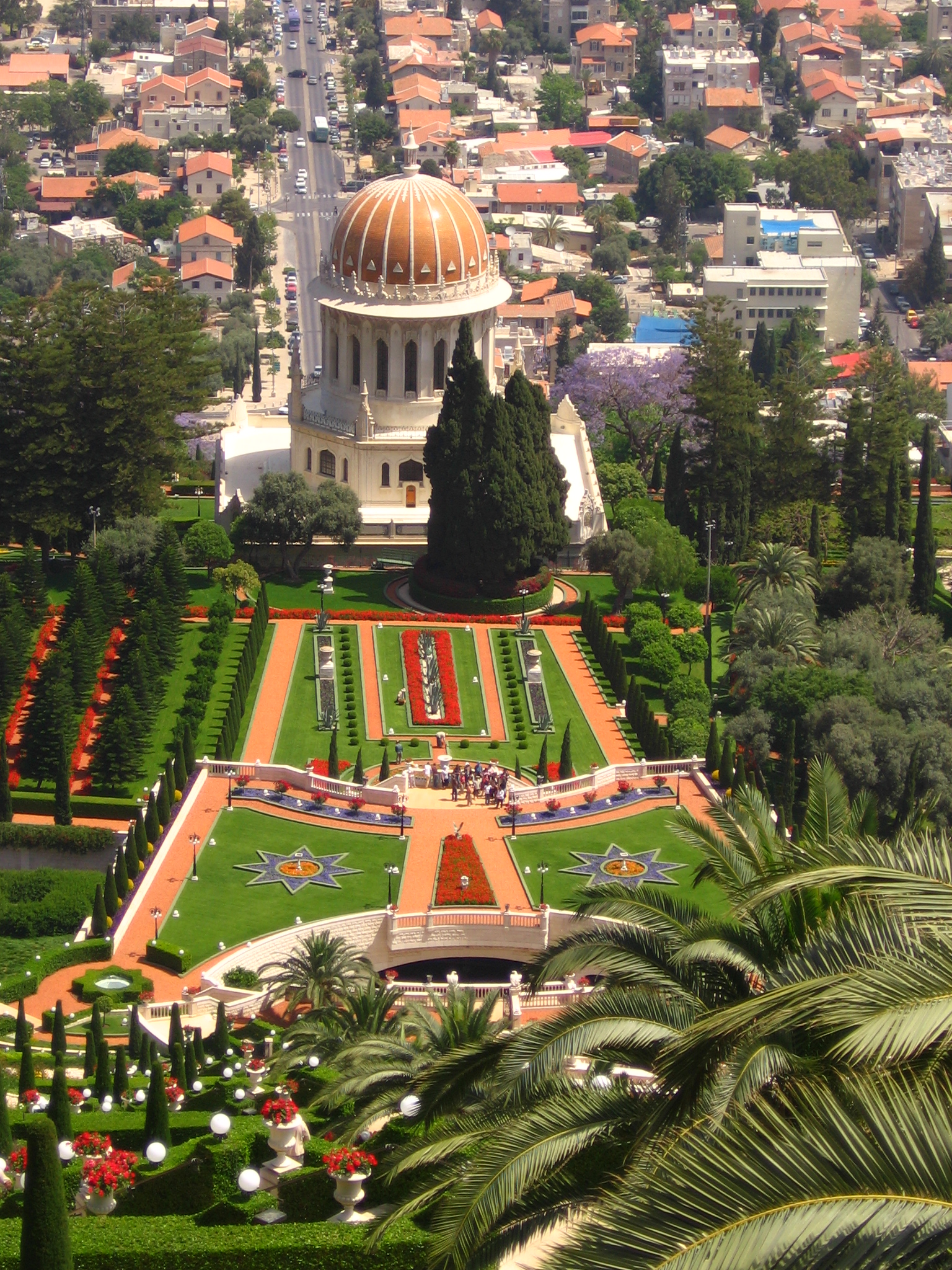
View towards the Shrine of the Báb from the upper Terraces on Mount Carmel, Haifa

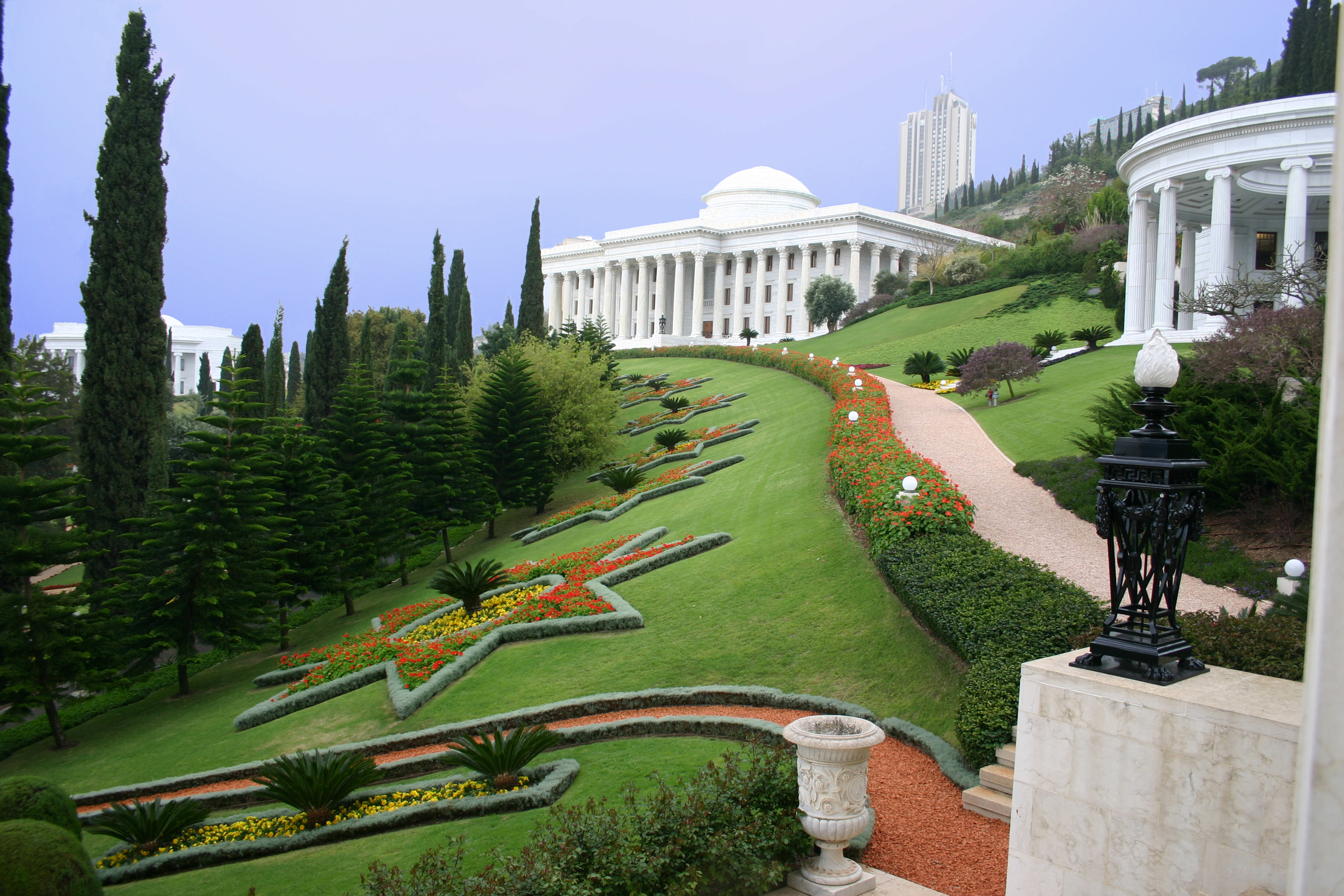
The Baháʼí Arc from the International Archives building

The Baháʼí Faith has its administrative and spiritual centre in Haifa on land it has owned since Bahá'u'lláh's imprisonment in Acre in the early 1870s by the Ottoman Empire. The progress of these properties in construction projects was welcomed by the mayor of Haifa Amram Mitzna (1993–2003). As far back as 1969 a presence of Baháʼís was noted mostly centered around Haifa in Israeli publications. Several newspapers in Israel since then have noted the presence of Baháʼís in the Haifa area of some 6-700 volunteers with no salaries, receiving only living allowances and housing, and that if an Israeli citizen wished to convert they would be told that "the religion does not seek or accept converts in the State of Israel"; if they persist, individuals are told it is a personal matter between them and God and not a matter of joining a community of believers. Baháʼís generally practice a "staunch political quietism" and "do not engage in any missionary activity in Israel". Even Baháʼís from outside Israel are instructed to not "teach" the religion to citizens of Israel. The religion's situation in Israel was specified in an agreement signed in 1987 by then Vice-Premier and Foreign Minister, Shimon Peres as a "recognized religious community in Israel", that the "holiest places of the Baháʼí Faith, … are located in Israel, and confirms that the Universal House of Justice is the Trustee of the Baháʼí International Community over the Holy Places of the Baháʼí Faith in Israel and over the Bahá’í endowments in Israel". Baháʼís from other countries, wishing to visit Israel, are required to seek written permission from the Universal House of Justice prior to their visit for Baháʼí pilgrimage.

=== Samaritans ===
Israel is home to the only significant populations of Samaritans in the world. They are adherents of Samaritanism—an Abrahamic religion similar to Judaism. As of 1 November 2007, there were 712 Samaritans. The community lives almost exclusively in Kiryat Luza on Mount Gerizim and in Holon, which has a Samaritan neighborhood called Neve Pinchas. Their traditional religious leader is the Samaritan High Priest, currently Aabed-El ben Asher ben Matzliach. Ancestrally, they claim descent from a group of Israelite inhabitants from the tribes of Joseph (divided between the two "half tribes" of Ephraim and Manasseh), and the priestly tribe of Levi. Despite being counted separately in the census, for the purposes of citizenship, the Israeli Chief Rabbinate has classified them as Jews according to law.

=== Hinduism ===
The small Hindu community in Israel is mostly made up of representatives of the International Society for Krishna Consciousness. In 2002, most of the devotees lived in Katzir-Harish.

=== Neopaganism ===
Although the exact number of adherents are unknown (one old estimate was 150 total), primarily due to societal stigma and persecution, a growing number of young Israelis are secretly reviving the pre-Judaic polytheistic worship of ancient Canaanite gods known as Semitic neopaganism. Additionally, others worship in different neopagan traditions such as Celtic, Norse, and Wiccan.

== Sanctity of certain sites ==
=== Jerusalem ===
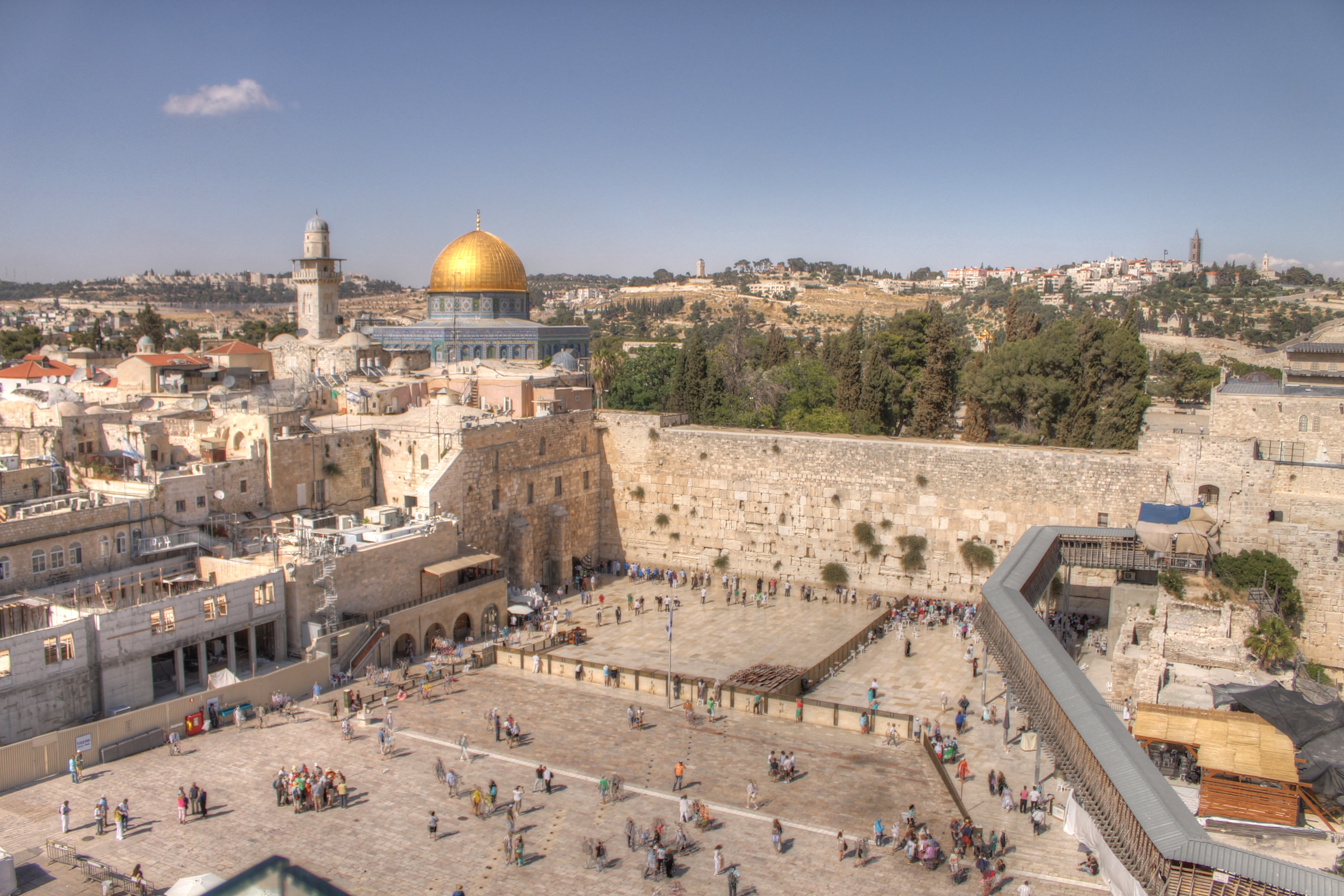
The Western Wall and Dome of the Rock, on top of the Temple Mount

Jerusalem plays an important role in three monotheistic religions—Judaism, Christianity, and Islam—and Haifa and Acre play a role in a fourth, Baháʼí. Mount Gerizim is a holy site to what can be considered a fifth, Samaritanism. The 2000 Statistical Yearbook of Jerusalem lists 1204 synagogues, 158 churches, and 73 mosques within the city. Despite efforts to maintain peaceful religious coexistence, some sites, such as the Temple Mount, have been a continuous source of friction and controversy. Jerusalem has been sacred to the Jews since the 10th century BC. The Western Wall, a remnant of the Second Temple, is a holy site for Jews, second only to the Temple Mount itself.

Christianity reveres Jerusalem not only for its role in the Old Testament but also for its significance in the life of Jesus. The land currently occupied by the Church of the Holy Sepulchre is considered one of the top candidates for Golgotha and thus has been a Christian pilgrimage site for the past two thousand years. In 1889, the Ottoman Empire allowed the Catholic Church to re-establish its hierarchy in Palestine. Other ancient churches, such as the Greek, Armenian, Syrian, and Coptic churches are also well represented in Jerusalem.

Jerusalem is the third-holiest city in Islam, after Mecca and Medina. The Temple Mount is known to Muslims as the Masjid Al-Aqsa, derived from the name mentioned in the Quran, and is topped by two Islamic landmarks intended to commemorate the event — Jami Al-Aqsa, and the Dome of the Rock, which stands over the Foundation Stone, from which Muslims believe Muhammad ascended to Heaven.

=== Other sites ===
As for the importance of Haifa and Acre in Baháʼí Faith, it is related to Bahá'u'lláh, who was imprisoned in Acre and spent his final years there.

Mount Gerizim is the holiest site to Samaritans, who used it as the site of their temple.

== Religious relations ==
=== Within the Jewish community ===
The State of Israel generally respects freedom of religion. Freedom House reports: "Freedom of religion is respected. Each community has jurisdiction over its own members in matters of marriage, burial, and divorce."

Religious tensions exist between Jewish haredi and non-haredi Israeli Jews. Haredi Israeli males devote their young adulthood to full-time Talmudic studies and therefore generally get exemptions from military service in the Israel Defense Forces. Many leaders of haredi Judaism encourage these students to apply for exemptions from the mandatory army service, ostensibly to protect them from the secularizing influence of the Israeli army. Over the years, the number of exemptions has grown to about 10% of conscriptable manpower. Many secular Israelis consider these exemptions to be a systematic shirking of their patriotic duty by a large segment of society.

Haredi Israelis are represented by haredi political parties, which like all smaller parties in a system of proportional representation may tend to wield disproportionate political power at the point when government coalitions need to be negotiated following national elections. As of June 2008, the two main Haredi parties in the Knesset are Shas, representing Sephardi and Mizrahi interests, and United Torah Judaism, an alliance of Degel HaTorah (Lithuanian Haredi) and Agudath Yisrael. The Shinui party was created as a backlash to the perceived influence of the haredi parties, and to represent the interests of secular Jews that supposedly were not seen to by the other non-religious parties.

Tension also exists between the Orthodox establishment and the Conservative and Reform movements. Only Orthodox Judaism is officially recognized in Israel (though conversions conducted by Conservative and Reform clergy outside of Israel may be accepted for the purposes of the Law of Return). As a result, Conservative and Reform synagogues receive minimal government funding and support. Conservative and Reform rabbis cannot officiate at religious ceremonies and any marriages, divorces, and conversions they perform are not considered valid. Conservative and Reform Jews have been prohibited from holding services at the Western Wall on the grounds that they violate Orthodox norms regarding participation of women.

Tensions exist surrounding Mehadrin bus lines, a type of bus line in Israel which mostly runs in and/or between major Haredi population centers, in which gender segregation are applied. Non-Haredi female passengers have complained of being harassed and forced to sit at the back of the bus. In a ruling of January 2011, the Israeli High Court of Justice stated the unlawfulness of gender segregation and abolished the "mehadrin" public buses. However, the court rule allowed the continuation of the gender segregation in public buses on a strictly voluntary basis for a one-year experimental period.

=== Between Jews and Christians ===
Messianic Jews who are members of Messianic congregations are among the most active missionary movements in Israel. Their proselytising has faced demonstrations and intermittent protests by the Haredi anti-missionary group Yad LeAchim, which infiltrates those movements, as well as other proselytising groups such as Hare Krishna, and maintains extensive records on their activities. Attempts by Messianic Jews to evangelize other Jews are seen by many religious Jews as incitement to "avodah zarah" (foreign worship or idolatry). Over the years there have been several arson attempts of messianic congregations. There have also been attacks on Messianic Jews and hundreds of New Testaments distributed in Or Yehuda were burned. While missionary activity itself is not illegal in Israel, it is illegal to offer money or other material inducements. Legislation banning missionary work outright has been attempted in the past.

Some Orthodox Jewish communities in Israel have come under scrutiny for the negative stereotyping and scapegoating of Christian minorities in the region, including violent acts against Christian missionaries and communities. A frequent complaint of Christian clergy in Israel is being spat at by Jews, often haredi yeshiva students. The Anti-Defamation League has called on the chief Rabbis to speak out against interfaith assaults.

Israel has been accused of obstructing Christian worship by Palestinian Christians by withholding entry permits at times of religious significance to the community. The Israel Nature and Parks Authority has also been accused of encroaching on Christian holy sites. In January 2023, with the rise of the political far-right and religious Zionist parties, emboldened Jewish extremists took to vandalizing Christian grave sites.

== Marriage and divorce ==
Currently, Israel issues marriage licenses if performed under an official religious authority (whether it be Orthodox Jewish, Christian, Muslim, Druze, etc.) only between a man and a woman of the same religion. Civil marriages were officially sanctioned only if performed abroad, but 2010 changes in Israeli law allow secular marriage in Israel for people that have proven to lack any religion also. This is a major issue among secular groups, as well as adherents to non-Orthodox streams of Judaism. There is fear that civil marriage will divide the Jewish people in Israel between those who can marry Jews and those who cannot, leading to concerns over retaining the character of the Jewish state.

== Relative sizes of the religious communities in Israel ==
Religion in Israel
Jewish, Muslim, Christian, Druze, Other.
Until 1995, figures for Christians also included Others.

The census results are in thousands.

Year	Druze		Christian		Muslims		Jews		Total
Year	num.	%	num.	%	num.	%	num.	%	Total
1948	...		...		...		758.7		...
1950	15.0	1.09%	36.0	2.63%	116.1	8.47%	1,203.0	87.80%	1,370.1
1960	23.3	1.08%	49.6	2.31%	166.3	7.73%	1,911.3	88.88%	2,150.4
1970	35.9	1.19%	75.5	2.50%	328.6	10.87%	2,582.0	85.44%	3,022.1
1980	50.7	1.29%	89.9	2.29%	498.3	12.71%	3,282.7	83.71%	3,921.7
1990	82.6	1.71%	114.7	2.38%	677.7	14.05%	3,946.7	81.85%	4,821.7
2000	103.8	1.63%	135.1	2.12%	970.0	15.23%	4,955.4	77.80%	6,369.3
2010	127.5	1.66%	153.4	1.99%	1,320.5	17.16%	5,802.4	75.40%	7,695.1
2011	129.8	1.66%	155.1	1.98%	1,354.3	17.28%	5,907.5	75.38%	7,836.6
2012	131.5	1.65%	158.4	1.98%	1,387.5	17.38%	5,999.6	75.14%	7,984.5
2013	133.4	1.64%	160.9	1.98%	1,420.3	17.46%	6,104.5	75.04%	8,134.5
2014	135.4	1.63%	163.5	1.97%	1,453.8	17.52%	6,219.2	74.96%	8,296.9
2015	137.3	1.62%	165.9	1.96%	1,488.0	17.58%	6,334.5	74.84%	8,463.4
2016	139.3	1.61%	168.3	1.95%	1,524.0	17.66%	6,446.1	74.71%	8,628.6
2017	141.2	1.60%	171.9	1.95%	1,561.7	17.75%	6,554.5	74.50%	8,797.9
2018	143.2	1.60%	174.4	1.95%	1,598.4	17.82%	6,664.4	74.32%	8,967.6
2019	145.1	1.59%	177.2	1.94%	1,635.8	17.90%	6,773.2	74.10%	9,140.5
2020	146.8	1.58%	179.5	1.93%	1,671.3	17.99%	6,873.9	73.99%	9,289.8
2021	148.6	1.57%	183.2	1.93%	1,708.9	18.07%	6,982.6	73.86%	9,453.0
2022	149.9	1.57%	179.4	1.88%	1,738.9	18.22%	7,050.6	73.88%	9,542.7
2023	151.6	1.56%	180.6	1.86%	1,777.1	18.33%	7,139.2	73.64%	9,694.3
2024	153.0	1.56%	181.8	1.85%	1,815.6	18.51%	7,212.9	73.56%	9,805.1

In 2011, non-Arab Christians, estimated to number 25,000, were counted as "Jews and others".

== See also ==
- Demographics of Israel
- Culture of Israel
- Hesder
- Jewish denominations
- Palestinian Christians
- Sherut Leumi
- Status quo (Israel)
- Tal committee

== Bibliography ==
- Aran, Gideon (2004) [1990]. "From Religious Zionism to Zionist Religion". In Goldscheider, Calvin; Neusner, Jacob (eds.). Social Foundations of Judaism (Reprint ed.). Eugene, Or: Wipf and Stock Publ. pp. 259–282. ISBN 1-59244-943-3.
- Aran, Gideon (1991). "Jewish Zionist Fundamentalism: The Bloc of the Faithful in Israel (Gush Emunim)". In Marty, Martin E.; Appleby, R. Scott (eds.). Fundamentalisms Observed. The Fundamentalism Project, 1. Chicago, Il; London: University of Chicago Press. pp. 265–344. ISBN 0-226-50878-1.
- Beit-Hallahmi, Benjamin (2011). "Jewish Religious Life in State of Israel". In Berlin, Adele (ed.). The Oxford Dictionary of the Jewish Religion (2nd ed.). Oxford; New York: Oxford University Press. pp. 385–387. ISBN 978-0-19-975927-9.
- Bilu, Yoram (2004). "The Sanctification of Space in Israel: Civil Religion and Folk Judaism". In Rebhum, Uzi; Waxman, Chaim I. (eds.). Jews in Israel: Contemporary Social and Cultural Patterns. Brandeis University Press. pp. 371–393.
- Cohen, Asher; Susser, Bernard (2000). Israel and the Politics of Jewish Identity: The Secular-Religious Impasse. Baltimore, Md: Johns Hopkins University Press. ISBN 9780801863455.
- Deshen, Shlomo (2004) [1990]. "The Social Foundation of Israeli Judaism". In Goldscheider, Calvin; Neusner, Jacob (eds.). Social Foundations of Judaism (Reprint ed.). Eugene, Or: Wipf and Stock Publ. pp. 212–239. ISBN 1-59244-943-3.
- Deshen, Shlomo; Liebman, Charles S.; Shokeid, Moshe, eds. (2017) [1995]. Israeli Judaism: The Sociology of Religion in Israel. Studies of Israeli Society, 7 (Reprint ed.). London; New York: Routledge. ISBN 978-1-56000-178-2.
- Ezrachi, Elan (2004). "The Quest for Spirituality among Secular Israelis". In Rebhum, Uzi; Waxman, Chaim I. (eds.). Jews in Israel: Contemporary Social and Cultural Patterns. Brandeis University Press. pp. 315–330.
- Ferziger, Adam S. (March 2008). "Religion for the Secular: The New Israeli Rabbinate," Journal of Modern Jewish Studies 7, 1. pp. 67–90.
- Ferziger, Adam S. (2016). "Foreign Ashes in Sovereign Space: Cremation and the Chief Rabbinate of Israel, 1931–1990," Jewish Studies Quarterly 23, 4. pp. 290–313.
- Karesh, Sara E.; Hurvitz, Mitchell M. (2005). "Israel". Encyclopedia of Judaism. Encyclopedia of World Religions. J. Gordon Melton, Series Editor. New York: Facts On File. pp. 235–237. ISBN 0-8160-5457-6.
- Liebman, Charles S., ed. (1990). Religious and Secular: Conflict and Accommodation between Jews in Israel. New York: Keter Publ. House. ISBN 0962372315.
- Liebman, Charles S. (1993). "Jewish Fundamentalism and the Israeli Polity". In Marty, Martin E.; Appleby, R. Scott (eds.). Fundamentalisms and the State: Remaking Polities, Economies, and Militance. The Fundamentalism Project, 3. Chicago, Il; London: University of Chicago Press. pp. 68–87. ISBN 0-226-50883-8.
- Liebman, Charles S. (1997). Religion, Democracy, and Israeli Society. London; New York: Routledge. ISBN 90-5702-012-2.
- Liebman, Charles S. (Fall 1998). "Modern orthodoxy in Israel". Judaism. 47 (4). Archived from the original on 9 November 2005 – via FindArticles.
- Liebman, Charles S.; Cohen, Steven Martin (1990). Two Worlds of Judaism: The Israeli and American Experiences. New Haven, Conn: Yale University Press. ISBN 9780300047264.
- Liebman, Charles S.; Don-Yehiya, Eliezer (1983). Civil Religion in Israel: Traditional Judaism and Political Culture in the Jewish State. Berkeley, Ca: University of California Press. ISBN 0-520-04817-2
- Mazie, Steven V. (2006). Israel's Higher Law: Religion and Liberal Democracy in the Jewish State. Lexington Books.
- Melton, J. Gordon; Baumann, Martin, eds. (2010). "Israel". Religions of the world: a comprehensive encyclopedia of beliefs and practices. Vol. 4 (2nd ed.). Santa Barbara, Ca; Denver, Co; Oxford: ABC-Clio. ISBN 978-1-59884-203-6.
- Mor, Menachem; Reiterer, Friedrich V.; Winkler, Waltraud, eds. (2010). Samaritans: Past and Present: Current Studies. Studia Samaritana, 5 & Studia Judaica, 53. Berlin: De Gruyter. ISBN 978-3-11-019497-5.
- Peled, Yoav and Hurit (2018). The Religionization of Israeli Society. London; New York: Routledge.
- Posner, Sarah (29 November 2012). "Kosher Jesus: Messianic Jews in the Holy Land". The Atlantic.
- Pummer, Reinhard (1987). The Samaritans. Leiden: E. J. Brill. ISBN 90-04-07891-6.
- Ravitzky, Aviezer (1996) [1993]. Messianism, Zionism, and Jewish Religious Radicalism. Translated by Michael Swirsky and Jonathan Chipman. Chicago, Il: University of Chicago Press. ISBN 0-226-70577-3.
- Rosenak, Michael (1993). "Jewish Fundamentalism in Israeli Education". In Marty, Martin E.; Appleby, R. Scott (eds.). Fundamentalisms and Society: Reclaiming the Sciences, the Family, and Education. The Fundamentalism Project, 2. Chicago, Il; London: University of Chicago Press. pp. 374–451. ISBN 0-226-50880-3.
- Schweid, Eliezer (2004). "Judaism in Israeli Culture". In Rebhum, Uzi; Waxman, Chaim I. (eds.). Jews in Israel: Contemporary Social and Cultural Patterns. Brandeis University Press. pp. 243–264.
- Sela, Shulamit (1994). "The Head of the Rabbanite, Karaite and Samaritan Jews: On the History of a Title". Bulletin of the School of Oriental & African Studies. 57 (2). University of London: 255–267. doi:10.1017/S0041977X00024848.
- Spector, Stephen (2008). Evangelicals and Israel. Oxford University Press. ISBN 9780195368024. LCCN 2008026681.
- Tabory, Ephraim (2004) [1990]. "Reform and Conservative Judaism in Israel". In Goldscheider, Calvin; Neusner, Jacob (eds.). Social Foundations of Judaism (Reprint ed.). Eugene, Or: Wipf and Stock Publ. pp. 240–258. ISBN 1-59244-943-3.
- Tabory, Ephraim (2004). "The Israel Reform and Conservative Movements and the Marker for the Liberal Judaism". In Rebhum, Uzi; Waxman, Chaim I. (eds.). Jews in Israel: Contemporary Social and Cultural Patterns. Brandeis University Press. pp. 285–314.
- Troen, Ilan (April 2016). Secular Judaism in Israel, Society, Vol. 53, Issue 2.
- Waxman, Chaim I. (1993). "Religious Culture and Politics in Israel". In Wertheimer, Jack (ed.). The Modern Jewish Experience: A Reader's Guide. New York; London: NYU Press. pp. 201–212. ISBN 0-8147-9261-8.
- Waxman, Chaim I., ed. (1994). Israel as a Religious Reality. Orthodox Forum Series. Northvale, NJ: Jason Aronson. ISBN 9781568210773.
- Waxman, Chaim I. (2004). "Religion in the Israeli Public Square". In Rebhum, Uzi; Waxman, Chaim I. (eds.). Jews in Israel: Contemporary Social and Cultural Patterns. Brandeis University Press. pp. 221–242.
- Waxman, Chaim I., ed. (2008). Religious Zionism Post Disengagement: Future Directions. Orthodox Forum Series. New York: Michael Scharf Publ. Trust, Yeshiva University Press. ISBN 978-1-60280-022-9.
