= Aminadav (disambiguation) =

Aminadav is a moshav in Israel. It may also refer to:

- Aminadav (non-profit organization) in Israel
- Nachshon ben Aminadav, a midrashic biblical figure
