= The Prohibition of Opening Entertainment Venues on Tisha B'Av Law =

Knesset
- Passed by: Knesset
- Passed: November 4, 1997
- Voting summary: 26 voted for; None voted against; 1 abstained
- Status: Current legislation

The Prohibition of Opening Entertainment Venues on Tisha B'Av (Special Authorization), 1997 is a law that deals with the public character of Tisha B'Av night in the State of Israel, enacted by the Knesset in 1997.

== Background to the Legislation ==
For many years, the custom in Israel was that no movies were screened on the night of Tisha B'Av. Most cafes and restaurants were closed, although some restaurants in the beachfront entertainment areas of Tel Aviv remained open. In the 1980s, many additional restaurants in Tel Aviv began opening as usual on Tisha B'Av night, and only reports issued against them led to their closure. Until 1997, some local authorities had enacted bylaws prohibiting the opening of entertainment venues on Tisha B'Av. In that year, a lawsuit was filed in the Tel Aviv Magistrate's Court seeking to annul these bylaws, arguing that they contradicted the Basic Law: Freedom of Occupation. The judge, Gabriel Shtrassman, accepted the lawsuit, ruling that the bylaws indeed contradicted the Basic Law: Freedom of Occupation unless otherwise determined by the Knesset. Since the time from the ruling until Tisha B'Av of that year did not allow for the enactment of appropriate legislation, entertainment venues in Tel Aviv only were opened that year.

In November of the same year (1997), a law was passed allowing local authorities to enact bylaws prohibiting the opening of entertainment venues on the eve of Tisha B'Av. The law also retroactively validated existing bylaws. The original bill, submitted by Knesset member Shaul Yahalom (National Religious Party), proposed that Tisha B'Av be declared a "National Day of Mourning," similar to Holocaust Remembrance Day and Memorial Day for Israel's Fallen Soldiers, but it was eventually designated as a "Day of Mourning for the Jewish People."

== Content of the Law ==
The law begins with a declaration that "Tisha B'Av is a day of mourning for the Jewish people for the destruction of the Temple." It specifies the start and end times of the fast (from sunset until the appearance of stars) and the postponement of the day if it falls on a Sabbath. The law then authorizes local authorities to enact bylaws prohibiting the operation of "entertainment venues" on the eve of Tisha B'Av until sunrise. Such bylaws can be made applicable throughout the entire area of the authority or in part of it, provided they apply uniformly to all residents in the designated area. The law also grants local authorities the power to appoint inspectors to enforce the law and impose a fine of 2,600 New Shekels (a standard fine for violations of municipal bylaws).

To define businesses as entertainment venues, the law refers to the Business Licensing Law, which details the types of entertainment venues: "theaters or cinema performances, concerts, discotheques, dance performances, cabarets, circuses, games or sports, and any similar entertainment, whether for payment or not, excluding lectures or debates whose primary purpose is educational, even if accompanied by the demonstration of pictures or sounds."

== Amendment (Extension to Food Establishments) - 2002 ==
In 2001, the legal advisor to the Tel Aviv Municipality, Ahaz Ben-Ari, formulated an opinion stating that the law did not apply to food establishments but rather to cinemas, theaters, discotheques, and the like. As a result, the Tel Aviv Municipality approved the opening of food establishments on the eve of Tisha B'Av that year. Despite Mayor Ron Huldai's insistence that this was merely a practical-legal decision with no ideological significance, it sparked a wide public debate about religious coercion and the Jewish character of the state.

In 2002, following this incident, an explicit provision was added to the law prohibiting the opening of food establishments.

In the bill's explanation, the law's initiator, MK Shaul Yahalom, explained that the closure of food establishments and entertainment venues is customary in Israel on days of mourning, and therefore, Tisha B'Av should be treated similarly to other days of mourning like Holocaust Remembrance Day and Memorial Day for Israel's Fallen Soldiers.

During Avraham Poraz's tenure as Minister of the Interior, he announced that he would not act against authorities that did not enforce the municipal bylaw regarding entertainment venues on Tisha B'Av. This announcement reignited the public debate concerning Tisha B'Av.
