= Sherut Leumi =

Alternative voluntary national service in Israel

- שירות לאומי
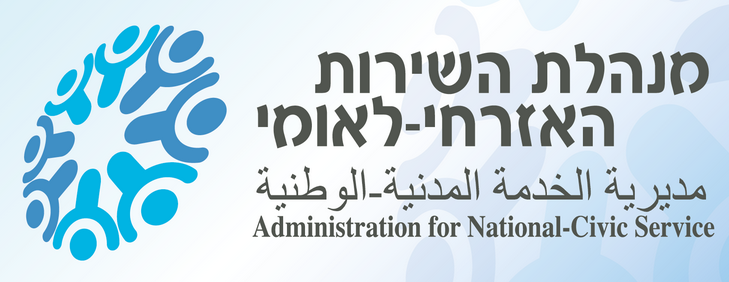
- Sherut Leumi logo
- Purpose: Alternative national service for those exempt from military conscription

Sherut Leumi (Hebrew: שירות לאומי, lit. 'National Service') is an alternative voluntary form of national service in Israel, as opposed to the mandatory military conscription prevalent in the country. It is designed for individuals who do not meet the eligibility criteria for service in the Israel Defense Forces, or who hold conscientious objections to military conscription. The program primarily was created for religious Jewish girls aged 17 to 24, although it is open to all applicants who cite diverse grounds for their decision.

== Background ==
The majority who receive an exemption from the obligatory conscription in Israel are Jewish women from the Religious Zionist sector, and they receive it by declaring religious observance, as they maintain that a large number of religious observances for women cannot be upheld in the military, such as dress codes to keep modest in Judaism. However, there are a small number of men who also serve in Sherut Leumi. Volunteers are between the ages of seventeen and twenty-four. Service typically requires working thirty to forty hours per week over twelve to twenty-four months. Volunteers have the option of doing either one or two years of the National Service. Not all volunteers are Israeli citizens. It can be done on a tourist visa, and the volunteer will later receive a special volunteer visa that lasts as long as the person will be doing their service.

Haredi men who maintain that Torah study is their way of defending Israel are exempted from conscription under an arrangement based on the principle of Torato Umanuto. Arab citizens of Israel, who are mostly Muslims, are exempted to prevent conflict between allegiance to their country and to their Arab families (a decision originally taken by Israel's first prime minister, David Ben-Gurion). Some Israeli conscientious objectors who object to serving in the army but are not eligible for an exemption have voiced a wish to do an alternative form of national service instead.

In 2012, Israel's cabinet extended military service exemption for 1,300 Haredi Yeshiva students as part of the Shirut Le'umi Mishmar. This allows Yeshiva students to join national service, as opposed to joining the IDF. As part of the scheme, the defense minister is obliged to postpone the military service of Yeshiva students approved for national civil service who are at least twenty-six years old or at least twenty-two years old and have at least one child. There is an organization called "Chaverim" that focuses on integrating Haredim into national service frameworks.

== Programs ==
The majority work in schools, but can also work in places such as special education, administration, hospitals, law, geriatrics, nursing homes, health clinics, teens at risk, internal security, disadvantaged communities, immigrant assistance, and many other organizations. Acceptance is based on an interview via a placement organizations that try to find the youth appropriate skills, interests, and needs.

== Placement organizations ==
There are four main placement organizations for Sherut Leumi. They are the Agudah LeHitnadvut (lit. Volunteering Union), Shlomit, Aminadav, and Bat Ami. Each volunteer is then assigned to a coordinator (rakezet), who serves as a supervisor and adviser for the youth throughout their time in Sherut Leumi.

== Benefits ==
Bnot Sherut (lit. female youth in the service) and Bnei Sherut (lit. male youth in the service) are entitled to a number of benefits during their service. Many of these benefits are the same as what a soldier serving in the army receives. They include:

- A monthly stipend for necessities. The amount varies with location and type of service, though usually it is approximately 1200 shekels a month.
- Apartment housing in the city where they are serving.
- Free bus rides across the country (except in Eilat) and (since 2001) free train rides.
- Discounts offered by various business establishments.
- Social programs such as weekend getaways, tours, learning programs, and parties.
- (for foreign volunteers) private medical insurance.

Weekly classes are often available, and sometimes required, on various Judaism-related subjects.

At the end of the service, the Israeli volunteers receive a grant that can be used for things such as education, buying a house, or paying for a wedding.

== National Service for Israeli Arabs ==
Rather than volunteer for army service, young people who are Arab citizens of Israel have the option to volunteer for this alternative national service and receive benefits similar to those received by discharged soldiers. The volunteers are generally allocated to Arab populations, where they assist with social and community matters. As of 2010, there were 1,473 Arabs volunteering for national service. According to sources in the national service administration, Arab leaders are counseling youths to refrain from performing services to the Israeli state. According to a National Service official, "For years the Arab leadership has demanded, justifiably, benefits for Arab youths similar to those received by discharged soldiers. Now, when this opportunity is available, it is precisely these leaders who reject the state's call to come and do the service, and receive these benefits".

== See also ==
- Conscription in Israel
- National service
- National Youth Service
- Religion in Israel
- Status quo (Israel)
- Torah study
- Haredi conscription in Israel
- Hesder - Rav Yehuda Amital's concept combining Torah study and military service, mainly in the Religious Zionism sector
- Tal committee (the "Tal law")
- The Michael Levin Base - Free services, meals and supplies for Lone Bnai Sherut
