= Zephaniah Drori =

Israeli Orthodox rabbi and rosh yeshiva

Rabbi Zephaniah Drori צפניה דרורי
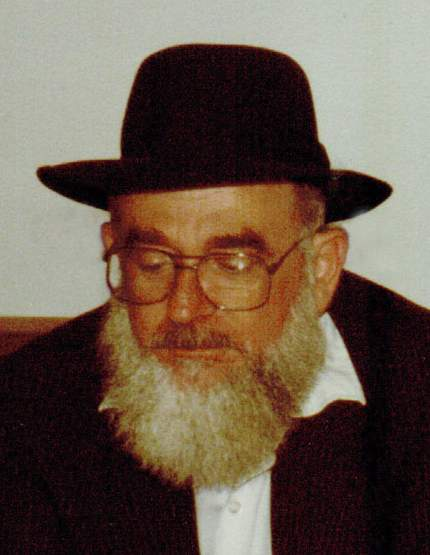
- Rabbi Zephaniah Drori, 1983
- Title: Chief Rabbi of Kiryat Shmona

Personal life
- Born: 13 March 1937 (age 89) Sde Ya'akov, Mandatory Palestine

Religious life
- Religion: Judaism
- Denomination: Orthodox
- Yeshiva: Kiryat Shmona Hesder Yeshiva
- Position: Rosh yeshiva

Rabbi Zephaniah Drori (Hebrew: צפניה דרורי; born March 13, 1937) (2nd of Nissan, 5697) is an Israeli Rabbi and educator. He served as the Chief Rabbi of Kiryat Shmona, Israel and the rosh yeshiva of the Kiryat Shmona Hesder Yeshiva.

He also headed the Aguda LeHitnadvut (Israeli Volunteer Association) (1990s-2011) and serves as Av Beit Din of the northern conversion beit din.

Drori is considered by many to be a leading scholar of the Religious Zionist camp. He first studied at the Bnei Akiva Kfar HaRoeh high school yeshiva when Rabbi Moshe-Zvi Neria served as rosh yeshiva. Later, he helped establish Yeshivat Kerem B'Yavneh, and then studied at Mercaz haRav yeshiva. There he became an important student of Rabbi Zvi Yehuda Kook.

Drori helped found the adjacent Yeshivat Yerushalayim L’Tzeirim yeshiva high school.

In 1968, with the blessing of Rabbi Zvi Yehuda Kook, Drori moved to Israel's northern border city, Kiryat Shmona, and became the chief rabbi. In 1977, he established the Kiryat Shmona Hesder Yeshiva.

== Published works ==
Hegyon Libi Lefanecha (2014) - a commentary on Orot HaTorah by Rabbi Abraham Isaac Kook
