= Israeli Volunteer Association =

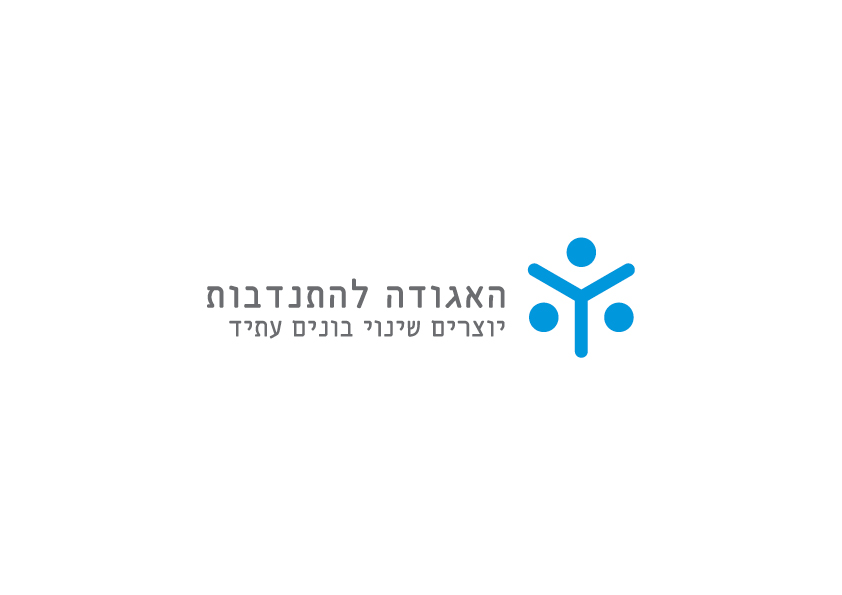
Logo

The Israeli Volunteer Association (Hebrew: האגודה להתנדבות, romanized: HaAguda LeHitnadvut) is the largest volunteer association in Israel. As of 2024, over 150,000 volunteers participated in its activities. It is engaged in the fields of security, welfare, education, and health. Its projects include works with Magen David Adom and Sherut Leumi.

It was initially established under the name האגודה להתנדבות בעם, HaAguda LeHitnadvut Ba'am (Association for Volunteering for the People) (later the name was shortened to "Volunteer Association") as a way of non-governmental implementation of the National Service Law and served the basis of Sherut Leumi. Initially it was intended for young women whose religion precluded military service (otherwise obligatory for both men and women in Isatel). The first board of the organization consisted of attorney Dov Froman, journalist and social activist Miriam Meir, and Shaul Yahalom.

In 1990s other associations joined the implementation of Sherut Leumi, with HaAguda LeHitnadvut remaining the largest among them.

From the very beginning all members of the executive committee were religious Zionists.

== Heads ==
- 1971-1990s: Dov Froman
- Zephaniah Drori
- 2011: Yaron Lutz
