= Shimi Geshayed =

Israeli social activist (born 1985)

- שימי גשייד
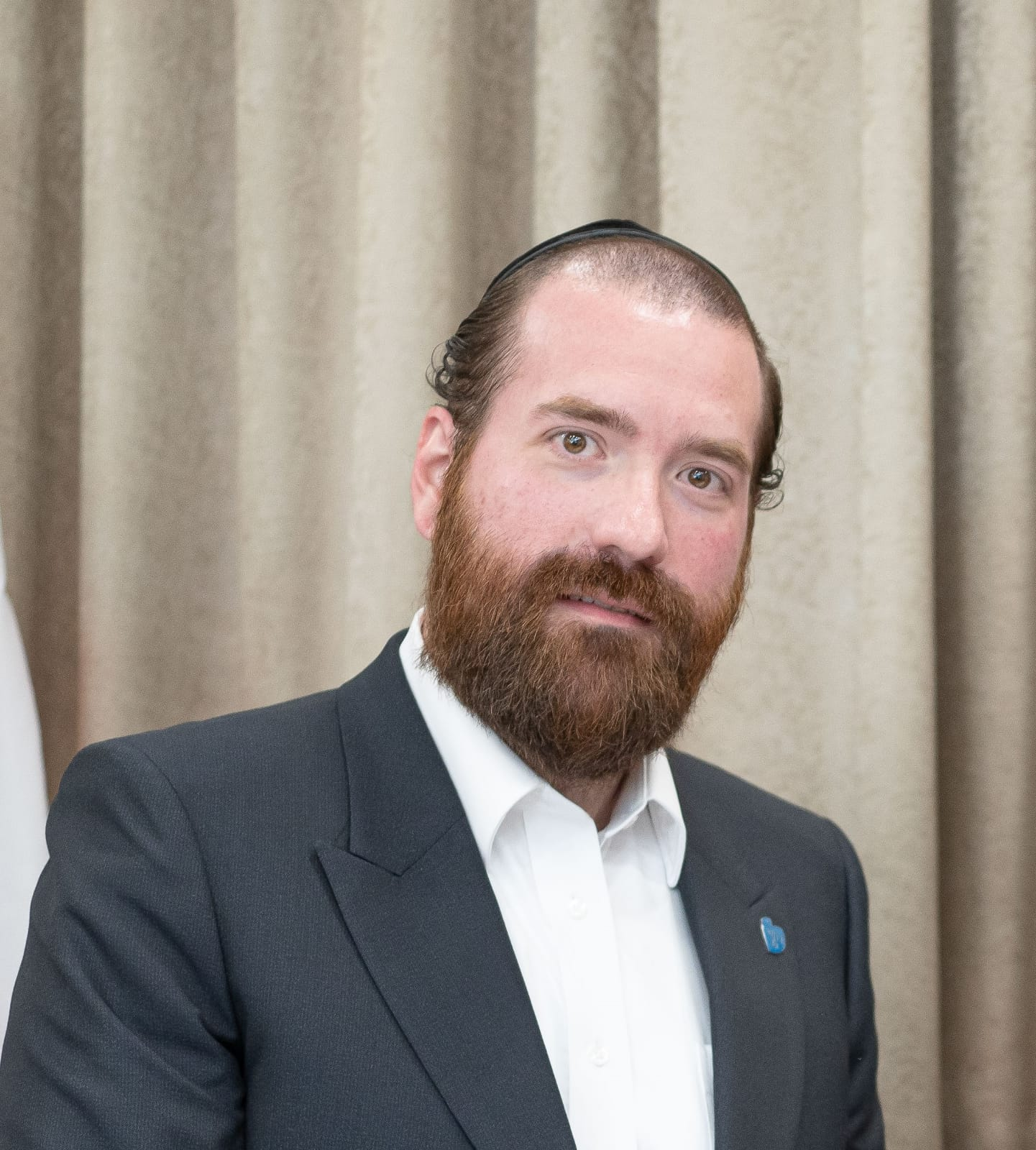
- Born: 1985 (age 39–40); Ashdod, Israel
- Education: Beit Israel Yeshiva
- Known for: CEO of the "Rachashei Lev" nonprofit organization

Shimi (Shimon) Geshayed (Hebrew: שימי גשייד; born 1985) is an ultra-orthodox Jewish social activist, CEO of Rachashei Lev, a nonprofit organization, and the founder and director of "Chaverim", an organization which manages the National Civil Service framework for the ultra-orthodox sector in Israel.

== Early life ==
Geshayed was born in Ashdod, Israel and is the son of Reuven Geshayed, the founder of Rachashei Lev. In his youth, he studied at Beit Israel Yeshiva.

In 2006, he began his National-Civil Service, serving for two years in the oncology department at Sheba Medical Center, where he established a special operations unit for cancer patients alongside medical teams. His service led him to join his father’s organization, Rachashei Lev, and later to establish the Chaverim organization.

Geshayed participated in the Maoz leadership program of the Israeli Prime Minister’s Office, through which he studied at Harvard Business School.

In 2020, he completed a Director and Senior Executive Training course at Bar-Ilan University.

In 2024, the minister of health appointed him as a member of the National Health Council, representing patient organizations.

== Career ==
=== Rachashei Lev ===
In 2006, Geshayed assumed the role of CEO at Rachashei Lev, a national support center for children with cancer in Israel, operating primarily at Sheba Medical Center and at Dana Hospital in Ichilov.

The organization provides ongoing daily activities in oncology departments, including staying with hospitalized children, accompanying them to tests and treatments, supporting families, and providing financial assistance when needed.

Rachashei Lev operates daycare centers and activity hubs at Sheba and Ichilov hospitals, offering round-the-clock support through professional staff, National Service volunteers, and additional volunteers. The organization also runs recreational clubs for children with special needs across Israel.

Additionally, the organization offers medical assistance, guidance, and advanced medical equipment for oncology departments, funds non-reimbursed medications, and promotes research and experimental treatments for children whose standard treatment protocols are ineffective.

Rachashei Lev also organizes activities to bring joy to sick children, including birthday celebrations, parties, fun days, vacation camps, and wish fulfillment.

In 2013, Geshayed facilitated a meeting between Rachashei Lev children and Lionel Messi and the Barcelona Football Club, attended by Prime Minister Benjamin Netanyahu and his wife.

In 2017, Geshayed, together with a child with cancer met with U.S. president Donald Trump. In 2019, he visited the Vatican with three Israeli children battling cancer and met the Pope. In 2022, he met U.S. president Joe Biden alongside a child suffering from leukemia.

In 2020, Salome Zourabichvili, the president of Georgia, visited the organization’s daycare center. At the end of the visit, Geshayed awarded her the organization’s "Golden Heart Shield".

During the Gaza war, Geshayed was one of the initiators of the ISEME project, which provided IDF medical teams with five million dollars' worth of advanced emergency medical equipment.

=== Chaverim Organization ===
In 2013, Geshayed founded Chaverim, an organization which manages the National-Civil Service framework, integrating young Haredim into various service tracks while accommodating their lifestyle.

Through this organization, nearly 11,000 Haredi youth have been recruited into various service programs, including volunteering in community organizations such as Hatzalah, ZAKA, Yad Sarah, and others. The organization also facilitates professional training and academic studies for Haredi youth, integrating them into security agencies such as the Israel Police, Israel Prison Service, Magen David Adom, Fire and Rescue Services, the Prime Minister’s Office, the Tax Authority, and other government agencies.

The organization also operates preparatory courses to bridge educational gaps and promote integration into the civilian workforce. Additionally, Chaverim periodically hosts motivational and appreciation conferences.

As part of his work in Chaverim, Geshayed played a role in establishing the Knesset Lobby for National-Civil Service.

== Awards and recognition ==
- Certificate of Excellence from the Israel Police Commissioner.
- Certificate of Excellence from Prime Minister Ehud Olmert for his contributions to National-Civil Service.
- In December 2012, he received the Mayor of Ashdod's Shield for Community Contribution.
- Certificate of Appreciation from the minister of health for assisting IDF soldiers during the Gaza War.
- Included in Globes magazine's 40 Under 40 young leaders list in 2020.

== Personal life ==
Geshayed is married to Sarah and is the father of six children. He resides in Ashdod.
