= Adam Ferziger =

American intellectual and social historian

Adam S. Ferziger
- אדם פרזיגר
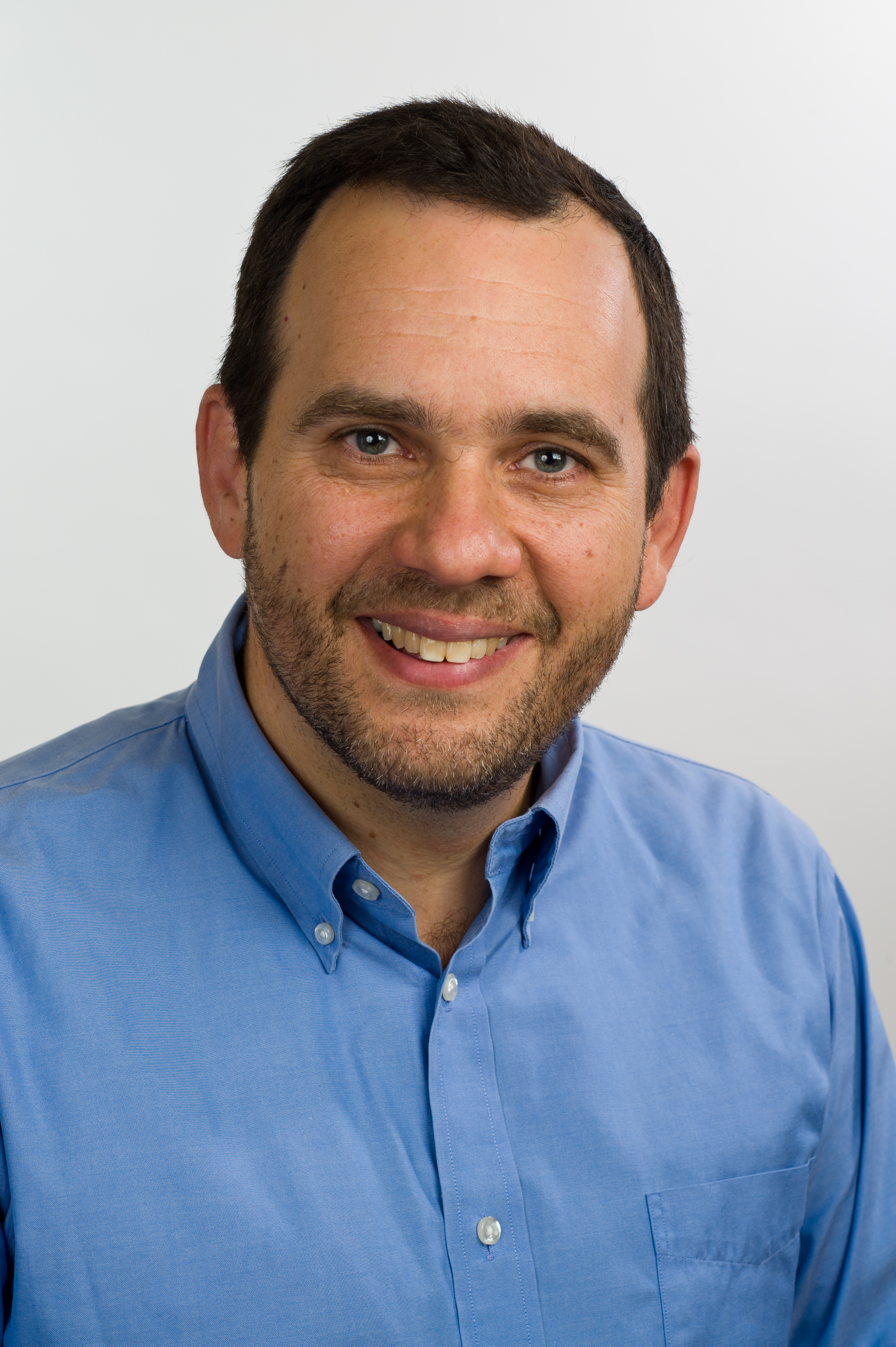
- Born: November 10, 1964; Brooklyn, New York
- Occupation: Jewish historian
- Awards: National Jewish Book Award

Academic background
- Education: Yeshivat Har Etzion, Yeshiva University, Bar-Ilan University
- Doctoral advisor: Gershon Bacon
- Website: https://jewish-history.biu.ac.il/en/node/812 https://biu.academia.edu/AdamFerziger

Adam S. Ferziger (Hebrew: אדם פרזיגר; born November 10, 1964, in the Flatbush section of Brooklyn) is an American intellectual and social historian whose research focuses on Jewish religious movements and religious responses to secularization and assimilation in modern and contemporary North America, Europe and Israel.

== Biography ==
A native of Riverdale, New York, Ferziger was educated at the SAR Academy and the Ramaz School in New York and in the study halls of Beit Midrash l'Torah and Yeshivat Har Etzion in Israel. He received his B.A., M.A. (mentor Professor Jacob Katz), and rabbinical ordination from Yeshiva University, and his Ph.D. Summa Cum Laude (mentor Professor Gershon Bacon) from Bar-Ilan University. He and his wife, Dr. Naomi (née Weiss) Ferziger (mentors Professor Ari Zivotofsky and Professor Ruth Feldman[1]), moved to Israel in 1989 and raised their six children in the city of Kfar Saba, where he is active in teaching and facilitating

=== Academic career ===
Ferziger holds the Samson Raphael Hirsch Chair for Research of the Torah with Derekh Erez Movement in the Department of Jewish History and Contemporary Jewry at Bar-Ilan University, Ramat Gan, Israel. He is a senior associate at the Oxford Centre for Hebrew and Jewish Studies and is co-convener of the annual Oxford Summer Institute for Modern and Contemporary Judaism.

He has served as a visiting professor/fellow in College of Charleston (2017), Wolfson College, University of Oxford, UK (2013), University of Sydney, New South Wales, Australia (2012), and University of Shandong, Jinan, China (2005). In 2011, he received Bar-Ilan's "Outstanding Lecturer" award.

In his capacity as a senior research fellow at Bar-Ilan's Rappaport Center for Assimilation Research, Ferziger authored major analyses of religious leadership, and of novel frameworks for promoting Jewish identity. He served for over ten years as a historian for Heritage Seminars to Eastern Europe. In the latter role he taught thousands of American youth about the legacy of Eastern European Jewry and the destruction of the Holocaust. He has presented invited talks and participated in international conferences at institutions of higher learning worldwide including: Central European University – Budapest, Columbia University, Harvard University Law School, The Hebrew University - Jerusalem, New York University, Hebrew Union College - Los Angeles, Jewish Theological Seminary, Monasch University - Melbourne, Northwestern University, Open School – Belgrade; University of Oxford, Princeton University, Rice University, Tel Aviv University, UCLA, University of Cape Town, University of Chicago, University of Frankfurt, University of Hamburg, University of Scranton, University of Sydney, and Yeshiva University. He is also invited regularly to lecture publicly throughout Israel, North America, Continental Europe, South Africa, and the United Kingdom.

== Published works ==
Books (author):

- Exclusion and Hierarchy: Orthodoxy, Nonobservance and the Emergence of Modern Jewish Identity. Philadelphia: University of Pennsylvania Press. 2005. ISBN 978-0812238655.
- Jewish Denominations – Addressing the Challenges of Modernity. The Hebrew University of Jerusalem - Melton Institute. 2012.
- Beyond Sectarianism: The Realignment of American Orthodox Judaism, Detroit, Mi: Wayne State University Press. 2015. National Jewish Book Award Winner

Books (editor)

- Orthodox Judaism – New Perspectives, with Professor Aviezer Ravitsky and Professor Yoseph Salmon. Magnes Press. 2006.
- Vladimir (Ze'ev) Khanin, Alek Epstein, and Marina Niznik, Russian Speaking Israelis at 'Home' and 'Abroad': Identity and Migration. Bar-Ilan. 2011.
- Darkei Daniel - The Paths of Daniel: Studies in Judaism and Jewish Culture in Honor of Rabbi Professor Daniel Sperber. Bar-Ilan University Press. 2017
- Yitz Greenberg and Modern Orthodoxy: The Road Not Taken. Academic Studies Press 2019.

Selected Articles:

- "Fluidity and Bifurcation: Critical Biblical Scholarship and Orthodox Judaism in Israel and North America," Modern Judaism 39, 3 (Sept. 2019), 233–270.
- "Female Leadership in Male Space: The Sacralization of the Orthodox Rabbi," The Journal of Religion 98:4 (October 2018): 490–516.
- "Foreign Ashes in Sovereign Space: Cremation and the Chief Rabbinate of Israel, 1931–1990," Jewish Studies Quarterly 23, 4 (2016): 290–313.
- "Hungarian Separatist Orthodoxy and the Migration of its Legacy to America: The Greenwald-Hirschenson Debate," Jewish Quarterly Review 105, 2 (2015): 250-283.
- "Beyond Bais Yaakov, Orthodox Outreach and the Emergence of Haredi Women as Religious Leaders," Journal of Modern Jewish Studies 14, 1 (2015): 140–159.
- "On Fragmentary Judaism: The Jewish “Other” and the Worldview Of R. Dr. Aharon Lichtenstein," Tradition 47, 4 (2015), 34-68.
- "From Lubavitch to Lakewood: The 'Chabadization' of American Orthodoxy," Modern Judaism 33, 2 (2013), 101–124.
- "Abraham Geiger and the Denominational Approach to Jewish Religious Life," in Christian Wiese (ed.), Jüdische Existenz in de Moderne: Abraham Geiger und die Wissenschaft des Judentums (Berlin: Walter De Gruyter, 2013), 179–192.
- “Ashes to Outcasts: Cremation, Jewish Law, and Identity in Early Twentieth-century Germany,”AJS Review 36,1 (April 2012), 71–102.
- "'Outside the Shul': The American Soviet Jewry Movement and the Rise of Solidarity Orthodoxy (1964–1986)," Religion and American Culture 22, 1 (Winter 2012), 83-130
- "The Hamburg Cremation Controversy and the Diversity of German-Jewish Orthodoxy," Leo Baeck Institute Year Book 56, 1 (2011), 175–205.
- "Holocaust, Hurban, and Haredization: Pilgrimages to Eastern Europe and the Realignment of American Orthodoxy," Contemporary Jewry 31 (2011), 25–54.
- "The Road Not Taken: Rabbi Salamon Zvi Schück and the Legacy of Hungarian Orthodoxy," Hebrew Union College Annual (HUCA) 79 (2011), 107–140.
- "'Create for Yourself a Congregation': Parallel Changes in the Israeli and North American Rabbinates," in Yedidya Stern and Shuki Friedman (eds.), The Rabbinate (Ramat Gan and Jerusalem: Bar-Ilan University Faculty of Law and Israel Democracy Institute, 2011), 203-252 [Hebrew].
- "Between Catholic Israel and the K'rov Yisrael: Non-Jews in Conservative Synagogues (1982-2008)," Journal of Jewish Studies, LXI, 1 (Spring 2010), 88–116
- "Tradition at the Cusp of Modernity: A Sermon by Rabbi Jonathan Eybeschütz," Rafael Medoff (ed.), Rav Chessed: Essays in Honor of Rabbi Dr. Haskel Lookstein (New York: Ktav, 2009), 145–168.
- "Feminism and Heresy: The Construction of a Jewish Meta-Narrative," Journal of the American Academy of Religion 77, 3 (September 2009), 494–546.
- "From Demonic Deviant to Drowning Brother: Reform Judaism in the Eyes of Orthodoxy (1983-2007)," Jewish Social Studies 15, 3 (Spring/Summer 2009), 56–88.
- "Religion for the Secular: The New Israeli Rabbinate," Journal of Modern Jewish Studies 7, 1 (March 2008), 67–90.
- "Holy Land in Exile: The Torah MiTzion Movement – Toward a New Paradigm for Religious Zionism," in Chaim I. Waxman (ed.) Religious Zionism: Future Directions (New York: Yeshiva University Press, 2008), 373–414.
- "Church/Sect Theory and American Orthodoxy Reconsidered," in Stuart Cohen and Bernard Susser (eds.), Ambivalent Jew (New York: Jewish Theological Seminary, 2007), 107–124.
- "The Religious Extremist as Halakhic Adjudicator – Rabbi Hayyim Sofer," in Meir Litvak and Ora Limor (eds.), Religious Extremism (Jerusalem: Merkaz Shazar, 2007), 85-112 [Hebrew].
- "The Emergence of the Community Kollel: A New Model for Addressing Assimilation," Rappaport Center for Assimilation Research - Research and Position Paper #13 (Ramat Gan, 2006).
- "Orthodox Identity and the Status of Nonobservant Jews: A Reconsideration of the Approach of Rabbi Jacob Ettlinger," in Yoseph Salmon, Aviezer Ravitzky, and Adam S. Ferziger (eds.), Orthodox Judaism – New Perspectives (Jerusalem: Magnes Press, 2006), 179-209 [Hebrew]
- Orthodox Judaism in America in the Late 20th Century," in Binyamin Lau (ed.), A People That Dwells Alone (Tel-Aviv: Yediot Aharonot, 2006), 324-341, 478-482 [Hebrew].
- “Between Outreach and Inreach: Redrawing the Lines of the American Orthodox Rabbinate,” Modern Judaism 25 (2005), 237–263.
- “Religious Zealotry and Religious Law: Reexamining Conflict and Coexistence,” Journal of Religion (January 2004), 48–77.
- “Constituency Definition: The German-Orthodox Dilemma,” in Jack Wertheimer (ed.), Jewish Religious Leadership: Image and Reality II (New York: Jewish Theological Seminary, 2004), 535–568.
- “Training American Orthodox Rabbis to Play a Role in Confronting Assimilation: Programs, Methodologies and Directions,” Rappaport Center for Assimilation Research - Research and Position Paper #4 (Ramat Gan, 2003).
- "Between “Ashkenazi” and Sepharad: An Early Modern German Rabbinic Response to Religious Pluralism in the Spanish-Portuguese Community" Studia Rosenthaliana 35, 1 (Spring, 2001), 7-22.
- “The Lookstein Legacy: An American Orthodox Rabbinical Dynasty,” Jewish History 13, 1 (Spring 1999), 127–149.
- “The Hungarian Orthodox Rabbinate and Zionism: The Case of R. Salamon Zvi Schück,” Proceedings of the Twelfth World Congress of Jewish Studies 11, IIIC (1993), 273–80.
