= Masortim =

Israeli Jews who perceive and define themselves as neither strictly religious nor secular

Masortim (Hebrew: מסורתיים, Masortiim lit. "traditional [people]", also known as Shomrei Masoret שומרי מסורת; lit. 'upholders of tradition') is an Israeli Hebrew term for Jews who perceive and define themselves as neither strictly religious (dati) nor secular (hiloni). Their affinity is mainly to mohels and rabbis of Orthodox Judaism (for their brit milah, bar mitzvah, and weddings), and in 2015 they comprised roughly one-third of the Jewish population in Israel.

== Group ==
Masortim—not to be confused with Masorti (or Conservative) Jews—observe many of the minhagim and halachot most associated with normative Judaism. Only a few authors, like Elliot Nelson Dorff, consider the American Conservative (masorti) movement and Israeli masorti group to be one and the same. Similar to Dati and Haredi Israelis, most Masortim affirm a strong belief in God; endorse the belief that Israel was given by God to the Jews; keep kosher; observe Jewish holidays and Shabbat; and study Torah or Gemara semi-regularly. Unlike their Orthodox and Haredi coreligionists, Masortim less frequently report regular synagogue attendance or prayer; public head-covering; belief in a conflict between science and religion; or support for remaking Israel into a halachic state. Like Hilonim, most Masortim prefer Israel to be governed by democratic principles; keeping public transportation open on Shabbat; and extending the military draft to Haredi men.

The number of Masortim is hard to determine since it is based upon the self-definition of the participants in surveys. According to a 2006 Israel Central Bureau of Statistics estimate, 39% of the Jewish Israeli population define themselves as Masortim. In 2016, Pew Research Center put that figure at 29% of Israeli Jews (or 23% of Israeli adults).

== Traditions ==
Shomrei Masoret perceive the preservation of the Jewish tradition, minhagim, and family customs as an educational and a family value.

The tradition, minhagim, and family customs are also relevant in terms of the Jewish denomination of origin affiliation, and thus the percentage of Shomrei Masoret is especially high among the Mizrahi denomination of origin affiliation. Many of them (and their offspring) define themselves as Shomer Masoret (or Masorti), even if some or part of their lifestyle's customs are generally accounted as secular (Hiloni), still, they pay heed to preserving and keeping the Jewish traditional heritage as it was observed in their or their parents' country of origin. In that context, the political party Shas (a religious-Orthodox Mizrahi-denomination political party) raised the banner of "להחזיר עטרה ליושנה" (Restore Past Glory), a slogan that swept many non-religious-Orthodox Mizrahi-denomination voters, who, nevertheless, see the importance of preserving their traditional denomination.

One may not find many Ashkenazi (European displacement) Israelis defining themselves as Shomer Masoret (or Masorati). This is because, among other reasons, the dichotomy that was created after the Age of Enlightenment between secular, Reform and Orthodox European Jews, was a dichotomy that did not exist among the Middle Eastern Jews.

== Distinguishing qualities ==
Masortim are not a denomination of Judaism but rather a sociological group, and their attitude towards the religious observance has much to do with one's personal preferences and tendencies, and in the context of their desire to see themselves as part of the comprehensive Jewish religious system, without being obligated to full observance of the 613 commandments. Every Masorti has their own level of observance, which depends only on one's own free will and one's personal selection of what is perceived by them as a relevant religious commandment, tradition or custom of Orthodox Judaism.

Nevertheless, one may ascribe to the majority of them a notable distinguishing quality – the preservation of the basic Jewish traditional minhagim, that are accounted as the most recognizable elements of Orthodox Judaism:

- Kashrut observance – Many Masortim give heed not to eat pork, shellfish, or any other non-Kosher food, and observe the separation of milk and meat kitchen activities and dishes.
- Kiddush Shabbat – a weekly family dinner on the eve of every Shabbat, and sanctification (kiddush) of the entering day of Shabbat, over a kiddush cup of wine.
- Mezuzah – affixing a mezuzah at the house's front door.
- Attending their synagogues on Shabbat and on the most recognizable Jewish festivals (such as: Rosh Hashanah, Yom Kippur etc.), on a regular basis. Some even wear the tefillin every morning.
- Following Orthodox traditions and maintaining an Orthodox atmosphere on family events, such as weddings, bar mitzvah, and brit milah.
- Usually, the male wears a kippah (yarmulke) only on Shabbat and Jewish festivals, and thus does not appear observant-religious. Some keep a yarmulke within their pocket or in their car, instead of wearing it, as to be ready for any event or time that the Shabbat or a Jewish festival has come and thus is time for them to pull out the yarmulke and start observing, or so they will be ready to go to the synagogue at any given time, as well as attend a wedding or any other event with a religious aspect in it.

== See also ==
- Hilonim
- Dati
- Hardal
- Haredi Judaism
- Religion in Israel
- Religious Zionism
