= Charles Liebman =

American political scientist and scholar of Jewish life

Charles S. Liebman
- ישעיהו ליבמן
- Born: 20 October 1934; New York City, United States
- Died: 3 September 2003 (aged 68)
- Occupations: Political scientist, professor, author
- Spouse: Carol Liebman
- Children: 3
- Awards: Marshall Sklare Award (2000); Israel Prize for government studies (2003)

Academic background
- Education: University of Miami (B.A.); University of Illinois (M.A., Ph.D.)

Academic work
- Institutions: Bar-Ilan University; Various U.S. university faculties
- Notable works: Ambivalent American Jew: Politics, Religion, and Family in American Jewish Life; Two Worlds of Judaism

Charles S. Liebman (Hebrew: ישעיהו ליבמן; New York City October 20, 1934 – September 3, 2003) was an American-born political scientist and prolific author on Jewish life and Israel. A professor at Bar-Ilan University, he previously served on university faculties in the United States. According to an obituary in The Forward, "Liebman was widely regarded as the pre-eminent social scientist of Jews and Judaism in the latter third of the 20th century." Haaretz also wrote that he was "considered one of the most important researchers into the culture and political behavior of Jews in Israel and the United States."

He won the Israel Prize for his contribution to political science in 2003.

== Education and early life ==
He was born in New York City and attended secondary school at the Gymnasia Herzliya in Tel Aviv. He earned degrees from the University of Miami (B.A.) in 1956 and University of Illinois (M.A., Ph.D.) in 1961.

He moved to Israel in 1969. With his wife Carol, he had three children. He was an observant Jew, concerned about intermarriage, served in the Israel Defense Forces on an education unit, and was politically a dove regarding Israel.

== Career ==
Upon receipt of his PhD he lectured at the University of Pennsylvania (1961–63), Yeshiva University (1962–69), and Columbia University (1964–65).

After moving to Israel he taught in the Department of Political Science at Bar-Ilan University. He was appointed full professor in 1978, and served as head of the department from 1980 to 1984. He retired in 2002.

During sabbatical years he held positions at the Jewish Theological Seminary, University of Chicago, Yale University, Brown University, and University of Michigan. He also gave lectures at Moscow State University, the University of Cape Town, and the School of Oriental and African Studies (SOAS) in London.

== Key publications ==
In 1965, Liebman published a pioneering essay, “Orthodoxy in American Jewish Life,” in the American Jewish Year Book. His 14 books include Ambivalent American Jew: Politics, Religion, and Family in American Jewish Life. According to Cohen (2003), Liebman "argued that American Jews struggle to integrate into the larger society while trying to maintain a distinctive group identity." According to Orthodox Rabbi Reuven Bulka, "Liebman's exhaustive study was an eye-opener for many who had dismissed Orthodoxy as a negligible force on the American Jewish scene and also was a partial harbinger of much more literature on Orthodoxy which has proliferated ever since."

In a provocative paper, "Extremism as a Religious Norm," Liebman (1983) analyzes religious extremism in Israel and argues that "religious extremism is the norm and that it is not religious extremism but religious moderation that requires explanation." A critical respondent appreciated the description of Israel but rejected Liebman's generalization as begging the question of whether "extremism should be regarded as "normal religion or even religion at all."

In a 1990 study of American and Israeli Judaism (“To Worlds of Judaism”), Liebman articulated a concept of "Jewish personalism" which, writes his co-author, is "the tendency of American Jews to pick those parts of Judaism they find personally meaningful, rather than complying with external requirements of religious law, Zionist ideology or ethnic obligation."

Personally, Liebman is said to have had a "fierce devotion to honesty, even at the risk of unpopularity" (Cohen 2003). For example, in a book review, he writes: "If a [reviewer] can't be kind he must be fair. I find it impossible to be kind to an author who writes.... a statement comparable to saying that an American state is located somewhere between New York and California. ... Since I cannot be kind I will try very hard to be fair. The book does have redeeming features" (Liebman 1984:137f.).

In November 2007, the Jewish Theological Seminary published a memorial volume, Ambivalent American Jew: Politics, Religion, and Family in American Jewish Life.

== Awards ==
- In 2000, Liebman was awarded the Marshall Sklare Award.
- In 2003, Liebman was awarded the Israel Prize, for government studies.

== Selected works ==
- "Orthodoxy in American Jewish Life" in the American Jewish Year Book 1966, pp. 21–92, 1965. (pdf version)
- Ambivalent American Jew: Politics, Religion, and Family in American Jewish Life, Varda Books, 2001. ISBN 1-59045-039-6
- Aspects of the Religious Behavior of American Jews. New York: Ktav Pub. House, 1974.
- Attitudes Toward Jewish-Gentile Relations in the Jewish Tradition and Contemporary Israel. Cape Town: Kaplan Centre, Jewish Studies & Research, University of Cape Town, 1983.
- Deceptive Images: Toward a Redefinition of American Judaism 1988, Transaction Publishers. ISBN 0-88738-218-5
- "Extremism as a Religious Norm," in Journal for the Scientific Study of Religion, 22:1, 75–86. March 1983.
- Li-Ḥeyot be-Yaḥad: Yaḥase Datiyim-Ḥiloniyim Ba-Ḥevrah Ha-Yiśreʼelit. Jerusalem: Keter Avi ḥai, 1990.
- Liḳrat teoryah Shel Ha-Liberalizm Ha-Yehudi. Jerusalem: Agudah le-ḥeḳer ha-ḳehilah ha-Yehudit, 1985.
- Pressure without Sanctions: The Influence of World Jewry on Israeli Policy. Rutherford: Fairleigh Dickinson University Press, 1977.
- Reconceptualizing the Culture Conflict among Israeli Jews. Zivion. Vol. 1. Ramat Gan: Zivion, Jolson Center for Israel, Judaism & Democracy, Faculty of Law, Bar-Ilan University, 2001.
- Religion, Democracy and Israeli Society. The Sherman Lecture Series. Vol. 2. Amsterdam, the Netherlands: Harwood Academic Publishers, 1997.
- Retsaḥ Poliṭi: Retsaḥ Rabin u-Retsiḥot Poliṭiyot Ba-Mizraḥ-Ha-Tikhon. Sidrat Taḳriv. Vol. 1. Tel Aviv: Merkaz Yitsḥaḳ Rabin le-ḥeḳer Yiśraʼel : ʻAm ʻoved, 1998.
- Religious and Secular: Conflict and Accommodation between Jews in Israel. New York, N.Y.: Keter Pub. House, 1990.
- "Reconstructionism in American Jewish Life," in American Jewish Yearbook, 1970
- [Review:] "The World of the Yeshiva: An Intimate Portrait of Orthodox Jewry by William B. Helmreich in AJS Review, 9:1 (Spring, 1984), pp. 137–140. (JSTOR)
- "Myth, Tradition and Values in Israeli Society" in Midstream 24, 1978"
- Yehude Ameriḳah Ṿe-Yiśrael. Jerusalem: Agudah le-ḥeḳer ha-ḳehilah ha-Yehudit, 1984.
- Liebman, Charles S. and Steven Martin Cohen. Two Worlds of Judaism : The Israeli and American Experiences. New Haven: Yale University Press, 1990.
- Liebman, Charles S. and Eliʻezer Don-Yiḥya. Religion and Politics in Israel. Jewish Political and Social Studies. Bloomington: Indiana University Press, 1984.
- Liebman, Charles S. Civil Religion in Israel : Traditional Judaism and Political Culture in the Jewish State. Berkeley: University of California Press, 1983.
- Liebman, Charles S. and Elihu Katz. The Jewishness of Israelis : Responses to the Guttman Report. SUNY Series in Israeli Studies. Albany: State University of New York Press, 1997.
- Liebman, Charles S. and Śarah Libman. Nośʼim Nivḥarim Ba-Havanat Ha-Ḳehilah Ha-Yehudit be-Artsot Ha-Berit. Ramat-Aviv, Tel-Aviv: ha-Universiṭah ha-petuḥah, 1988.
- Liebman, Charles S. and Merkaz Argov. A Research Agenda for American Jews. Israel: Bar-Ilan University, Dept. of Political Studies, 2001.
- Susser, Bernard and Charles S. Liebman. Choosing Survival : Strategies for a Jewish Future. New York: Oxford University Press, 1999.
- Tabory, Mala and Charles S. Liebman. "Jewish International Activity : An Annotated Bibliography". Research Aids / Bar Ilan University, the Argov Center. Vol. 1. Ramat Gan: Bar Ilan University, The Argov Center, 1985.

More available online: Charles Liebman on the Berman Jewish Policy Archive @ NYU Wagner.

== See also ==
- List of Israel Prize recipients
