= Aminadav (organization) =

Israel-based non-profit supporting religious women's national service

- Formation: 1990; 36 years ago
- Type: Non-profit
- Headquarters: Israel
- Region served: Israel
- Services: Supporting national service (sherut leumi) for religious women

Aminadav is an Israel-based non-profit organization which supports army-age religious women in Israel who have chosen to do national service (sherut leumi) instead of serving in the army. It is one of six organizations through which it is possible to sign up for service. There is a seventh organization, the Society for Social Equality and National Service, which serves the Arab population of Israel.

== History ==
Aminadav was founded in 1990 as a means to place young women who have received army exemptions in volunteer positions throughout Israel. Instead of serving their country as soldiers, they serve as volunteers in welfare settings such as old age homes, schools and hospitals. The women commit to working full-time for between one and two years.

Aminadav represents and promotes the philosophy of religious Zionism, including improving social welfare institutions in Israel, community involvement in Israeli society, and unity.

There are 35 coordinators found in every major city or region in Israel. Each coordinator takes responsibility for about 40 volunteers throughout their one or two years of service. There is also a national coordinator serving the 35 regional coordinators.

== Services ==
The regional coordinators offer the girls weekly group meetings as well as individualized counseling. Lectures and workshops cover religious issues or other issues. Aminadav also provides its volunteers with housing nearby to their volunteer jobs. Monthly stipends are also provided to cover meals and travel expenses. There are quarterly full-day seminars which offer professional enrichment workshops. Once a year the volunteers are taken on a weekend getaway as a way to say thank you for their service.

Representatives from Aminadav visit high schools throughout Israel to explain the benefits of national service and the options available for job placement.
