= Shaul Yahalom =

Israeli politician (born 1947)

- שאול יהלום
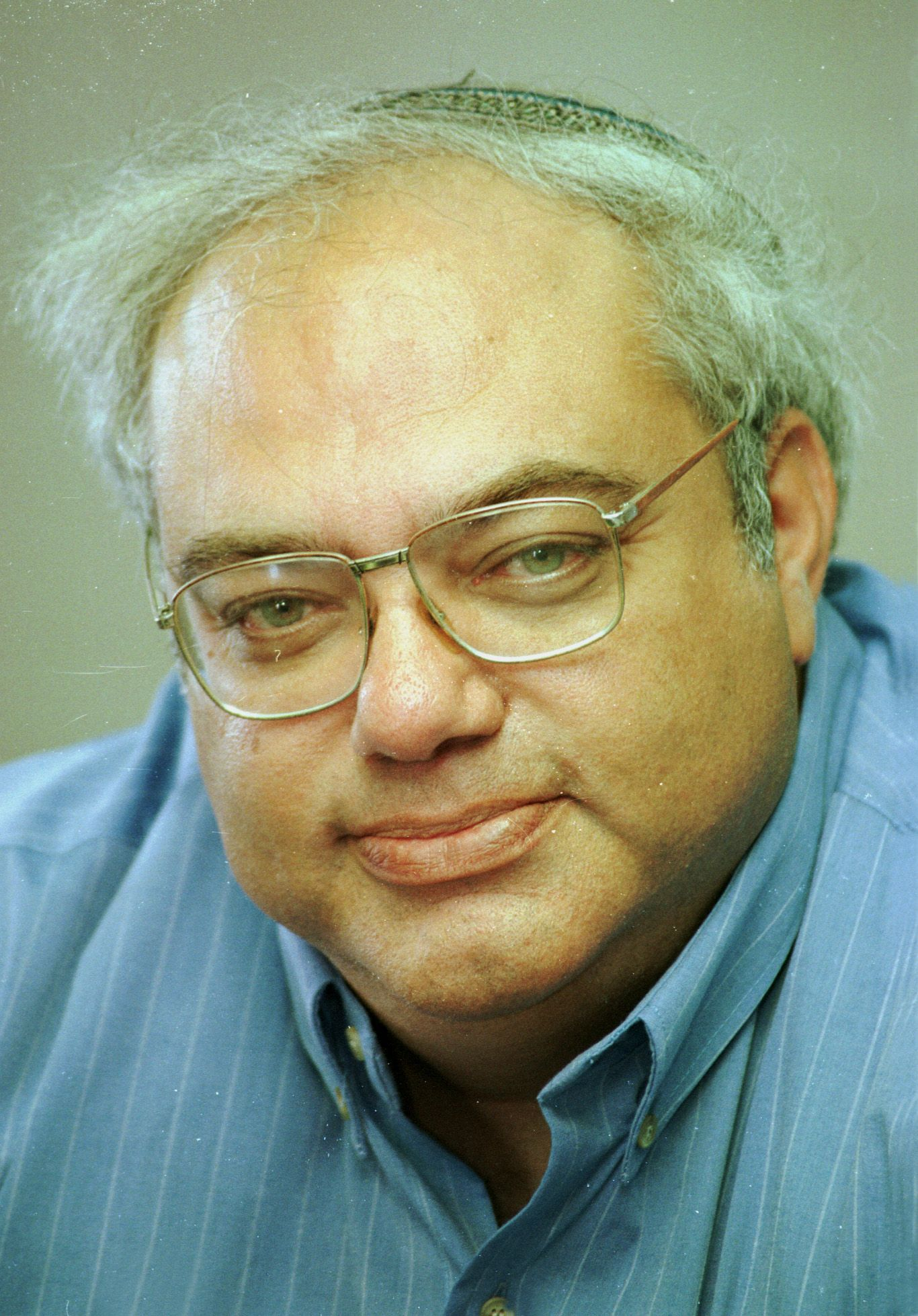

Ministerial roles
- 1998–1999: Minister of Transportation

Faction represented in the Knesset
- 1992–2006: National Religious Party

Personal details
- Born: 27 September 1947 (age 78) Tel Aviv, Mandatory Palestine

Shaul Yahalom (Hebrew: שאול יהלום; born 27 September 1947) is a former Israeli politician who served as a member of the Knesset between 1992 and 2006 for the National Religious Party.

== Biography ==
He was born in Tel Aviv during the Mandate era. After the discharge from the IDF Yahalom studied education and economics at Bar-Ilan University, gaining a BA, before working as a journalist.

He was also on the first board of the Israeli Volunteer Association.

He eventually became a member of the board of directors at the religious Zionist HaTzofe newspaper.

In 1987 he became the National Religious Party's political secretary, a role he held until 1995. He was first elected to the Knesset in the 1992 elections. In 1998, he was appointed Minister of Transportation. He lost his seat in the 2006 elections when the party was reduced to three seats.

Today, he is a member of the board of the Ariel University Center of Samaria. He also heads the weekly newspaper "Matzav Haruh", where he serves as chief editor and food critic.

He is married and has four children.
