= Chaim I. Waxman =

American sociologist

- Born: February 26, 1941 (age 85)
- Education: Yeshiva University (B.A.), The New School for Social Research (M.A. and Ph.D. in sociology)
- Occupation: Sociologist

Chaim Isaac Waxman (born February 26, 1941) is an American sociologist now living in Israel. He is the Professor Emeritus of Sociology and Jewish Studies at Rutgers University and a Senior Fellow at the Van Leer Jerusalem Institute.

== Academic career ==
Waxman received a B.A. in sociology from Yeshiva University in 1963. He received his M.A. and Ph.D. in sociology from The New School for Social Research. He was a Senior Fellow at the Jewish People Policy Planning Institute in Jerusalem until March 1, 2009. He is a Professor Emeritus of Sociology and Jewish Studies at Rutgers University.

== At the ASSJ ==
Waxman served as the president of the Association for the Social Scientific Study of Jewry (ASSJ) from 1979 to 1981.

== Books ==
- IGGUD: Selected Essays in Jewish Studies, Vol. 2, History of the Jewish People and Contemporary Jewish Society (Co-Ed. with Gershon Bacon, Albert Baumgarten, Jacob Barnai, and Israel J. Yuval). Jerusalem: World Union of Jewish Studies, 2009.
- Religious Zionism Post Disengagement: Future Directions. (Ed.). Orthodox Forum Series. New York & Jersey City, NJ: Yeshiva University Press/Ktav Publishing House, 2008.
- Historical Dictionary of Zionism, Second Edition (Co-Author, with Rafael Medoff). Lanham, MD: Scarecrow Press, 2008. Paperback Edition titled, The A to Z of Zionism, 2009. First Edition, Lanham, MD: Scarecrow Press, 2000.
- Flipping Out? Myth or Fact: The Impact of the “Year in Israel” (Co-Author with Shalom Z. Berger and Daniel Jacobson). New York: Yashar Books, 2007.
- Jews in Israel: Contemporary Social and Cultural Patterns (Co-Ed., with Uzi Rebhun). Hanover & Lehanon, NH: Brandeis University Press/University Press of New England, 2004.
- Jewish Baby Boomers: A Communal Perspective. Albany: State University of New York Press, 2001.
- Jews in America: A Contemporary Reader (Co-Ed., with Roberta Rosenberg Farber). Hanover: Brandeis University Press/University Press of New England, 1999.
- Tikkun Olam: Social Responsibility in Jewish Thought and Law (Co-Ed., with David Shatz and Nathan J. Diament). Northvale, NJ: Jason Aronson, 1997.
- Study Guide to accompany W. E. Thompson and J. V. Hickey, Society in Focus: An Introduction to Sociology, Second Edition. New York: HarperCollins, 1996.
- Israel as a Religious Reality (Ed.). Orthodox Forum Series. Northvale, NJ: Jason Aronson, 1994.
- American Aliya: Portrait of an Innovative Migration Movement. Detroit, Mi, Wayne State University Press, 1989. Reprint by Routledge.
- America’s Jews in Transition. Philadelphia, Temple University Press, 1983.
- Ethnicity, Identity and History (Co-Ed., with Joseph B. Maier). New Brunswick, Transaction Books, 1983.
- The Stigma of Poverty: A Critique of Poverty Theories and Policies, Second Edition. New York, Pergamon Press, 1983. First Edition, New York, Pergamon Press, 1977.
- The Palestinians: People, History, Politics (Co-Ed., with Michael Curtis, Joseph Neyer, and Allen Pollack). New Brunswick, Transaction Books, 1975.
- The End of Ideology Debate (Ed.). New York, Funk and Wagnalls, 1969. Paperback Edition, New York, Simon & Schuster, 1969.
- Poverty: Power and Politics (Ed.). New York, Grosset and Dunlap, 1968. Paperback Edition, Universal Library, 1968.
