= Inside Jewish Day Schools =

2021 book by Alex Pomson and Jack Wertheimer

Inside Jewish Day Schools: Leadership, Learning, and Community
- First edition
- Author: Alex Pomson, Jack Wertheimer
- Language: English
- Genre: Non-fiction
- Publisher: Brandeis University Press
- Publication date: 2021
- Publication place: United States

Inside Jewish Day Schools: Leadership, Learning, and Community is a 2021 book by Alex Pomson and Jack Wertheimer, published by Brandeis University Press. It presents nine case studies of contemporary Jewish day schools and their approaches to learning. The book has been positively reviewed for its broad overview of the trends in 21st Century Jewish education.
