= Alex Pomson =

Jewish education speaker and consultant

Alex Pomson (born 1964) is Principal and Managing Director of Rosov Consulting, a consulting firm for organisations and philanthropists in the Jewish communal sector.

In his teenage years, Pomson went to the Haberdashers' Aske's Boys' School. After spending a year studying at Yeshivat Har Etzion, Pomson studied history at Cambridge University (from where he received his B.A. and M.A.) and at the University of London (where he received his PhD in Religious education). During his time at Cambridge, Pomson served as the head of the Cambridge University Jewish Society and of the Cambridge University Israel Society. Pomson also served as the Secretary-General of Bnei Akiva of the United Kingdom and Ireland.

Pomson was a founder, vice principal and head of Jewish studies at the King Solomon High School in London. Pomson then went on to teach at York University in Toronto where he held the Koschitzky Family Chair of Jewish Teacher Education and was the coordinator of the Jewish Teacher Education Program. During his time at York, Pomson featured on numerous occasions in Maclean's University Ranking Guide as one of York's "Popular Profs". Pomson was also a senior lecturer at the Melton Centre for Jewish Education at the Hebrew University of Jerusalem. In 2021, he co-authored the book Inside Jewish Day Schools: Leadership, Learning, and Community.
