= Belief in God =

Various theistic positions can involve belief in a God or "gods". They include:

- Henotheism, belief in the supremacy of one god without denying the existence of others.
- Monotheism, the doctrine or belief that there is only one deity.
- Panentheism, the belief that a deity is a part of the universe as well as transcending it.
- Pantheism, a doctrine identifying the deity with the universe and its phenomena.
- Polytheism, the worship of or belief in more than one god.
- idolism, the belief in or worship of idols.

These positions are all contrasted by atheism, the non-belief in god.

== See also ==
- Deity
- Existence of God
