= Jack Wertheimer =

Historian

Jack Wertheimer is a Professor of American Jewish History at the Jewish Theological Seminary of America, the flagship educational organization of Conservative Judaism. He is the former Provost of JTS, and was the founding director of the Joseph and Miriam Ratner Center for the Study of Conservative Judaism. Wertheimer has written and edited numerous books and articles on the subjects of modern Jewish history, education, and life.

Wertheimer won the National Jewish Book Award in the category of Contemporary Jewish Life in 1994 for A People Divided: Judaism in Contemporary America. He was a finalist in 2008 in the category of Education and Jewish Identity for his edited volume Family Matters: Jewish Education in an Age of Choice.

== Books Written or Edited ==
- Unwelcome Strangers: East European Jews in Imperial Germany, Oxford University Press, 1987
- The American Synagogue: A Sanctuary Transformed, Cambridge University Press, 1987
- A People Divided: Judaism in Contemporary America, Basic Books, 1993; Brandeis University Press, 1997
- The Uses of Tradition: Jewish Continuity in the Modern Era, JTS Press/Harvard, 1993
- The Modern Jewish Experience: A Reader's Guide, NYU Press, 1993
- Tradition Renewed: A History of the Jewish Theological Seminary, JTS Press, 1997
- Jews in the Center: Conservative Synagogues and Their Members, Rutgers University Press, 2000
- Jewish Religious Leadership: Image and Reality, JTS Press, 2004
- Family Matters: Jewish Education in an Age of Choice, Brandeis University Press, 2007
- Imagining the American Jewish Community, Brandeis University Press, 2007
- Learning and Community: Jewish Supplementary School in the Twenty-first Century, Brandeis University Press, 2009
- The New American Judaism: How Jews Practice Their Religion Today, Princeton University Press, 2018 (Winner of a 2018 National Jewish Book Award)
- Inside Jewish Day Schools: Leadership, Learning, and Community, Brandeis University Press, 2021
