= Jeffrey S. Gurock =

American historian

Jeffrey S. Gurock is Libby M. Klaperman Professor of Jewish History at Yeshiva University in New York City.

== Biography ==
Gurock earned a bachelor's degree from the City College of New York, and master's and doctoral degrees from Columbia University. The title of his 1977 doctoral dissertation was "The History of the Jewish Community of Harlem, 1870-1930." He served as associate editor of American Jewish History from 1982 to 2002.

== Published works ==
He has written over a dozen books in the field of American Jewish history. His work focuses on the American Orthodox community and the variations in Orthodox practice and ritual over the course of American Jewish history. His books include Orthodox Jews in America (Indiana University Press, 2009), a comprehensive social and cultural history of this group and its relations to other Jews and mainstream American society, and Jews in Gotham (New York University Press, 2012), which chronicles New York Jewry from 1920 to 2010.

== Awards and distinctions ==
For its 135th annual gala in 2015, the City College of New York honored Gurock as one of its distinguished alumni

== Books ==
- A Modern Heretic and a Traditional Community: Mordecai M. Kaplan, Orthodoxy, and American Judaism. Coauthor with Jacob J. Schacter, Columbia University Press (1997)
