= The Jewish Catalog =

Publications of the Jewish Publication Society

The Jewish Catalog is a series of books published by the Jewish Publication Society in three volumes (1973, 1976, and 1980), which had a significant cultural impact upon the Chavurah movement of Judaism, and in the broader Jewish world, and were said to be "the most widely read books in the Jewish counter-culture," with total book sales of the series being more than half a million copies.

The series has been described as "a happy mixture of Jewish law and lore, apt quotations, well-chosen photographs, whimsical cartoons, and general irreverence that billed itself as a Jewish 'do-it-yourself kit,' a guide to how to become 'personally involved in aspects of Jewish ritual life, customs, cooking, crafts, and creation,'" that reflected a "personal, voluntaristic spirituality," with an emphasis on there being different expressions of Jewish spirituality.

A key theme throughout the series has been an earnest desire for "cultural authenticity" that rejects both consumeristic values of the dominant gentile culture but also rejects the values of the mainstream mid-century Jewish establishment, with a special focus on the concept of Tikkun Olam (repairing the world).

Despite the counter-cultural message and aesthetic of the book, it was published by the mainstream Jewish Publication Society in large part due to the vision of JPS Editor-in-Chief Chaim Potok, who saw The Jewish Catalog as a way for Judaism (and Jewish publishing) to remain relevant for the growing youth counter-culture.

== The first Jewish Catalog (1973) ==
The book was edited by Richard Siegel (a then 26-year old rabbinical student), Michael Strassfeld and Sharon Strassfeld (then 23-year-old members of Havurat Shalom of Boston). Much of the book reflected the experimental nature of the Chavurah movement.

The book was described by its editors as being about the “Jewish education and Jewish living in the fullest sense” but with an emphasis on the practical and DIY elements of the tradition, modeled in part on the famous Whole Earth Catalog. (Some have also noted similarities in style and approach with the classic book Our Bodies, Ourselves.) The book emphasized a democratic Judaism that was practiced by ordinary Jews, without the essential need for professionals and that was egalitarian in nature (rejecting prohibitions that would limit the role of women in Jewish ritual practice).

Subjects explored in this volume include: spiritual practices for the home, tips for Jewish travel (in Europe, Israel, and the Soviet Union), holidays, life cycle events, crafts, cooking, education and especially ways to reclaim traditional ritual practices, such as ritual purity laws, in non-Orthodox context.

Reception of the book was mixed with some relatively positive reviews, but others not. Most notable of the critics was Marshall Sklare who reviewed the book for Commentary Magazine, who acknowledged that the book was "a best seller with vengeance" in the Jewish publishing world, but criticized the book for its lack of respect for normative Judaism and its excessive deference to youth culture. In response, readers wrote in with a wide range of views, most critical of Sklare's review of the book, but with some in agreement.

== The second Jewish Catalog (1976) ==
The second volume was edited by Sharon and Michael Strassfeld and focused on the themes of Jewish life cycles, controversial issues (including sexuality, divorce and the rights of the disabled), education and Jewish study, and an introduction to synagogues and the arts.

One notable difference in the second volume is that it acknowledges that it has a larger readership than the havurah movement alone, but still calls for many of the innovations and practices of havurot to play a larger role in broader Jewish life.

== The third Jewish Catalog (1980) ==
The third Jewish Catalog, edited by Sharon Strassfeld and Michael Strassfeld, was said to be the final installment of the series and focused on the broad theme of the Jewish community, as well as the related issues of social justice, intermarriage, and conversion, as well as the challenges of living a Jewish life in challenging circumstances such as while serving in the military, doing time in prison or living in a rural area with few local Jews. The book also featured a significant discussion on the topic of Israel and ways that diaspora Jews can make connections with the land, as well as a comprehensive index to the entire series.

== Impact ==
While the book series can be seen as a dated symbol of the zenith of counter-cultural Judaism, some modern commentators have stated that the books are still relevant, particularly for the ethos of the growing DIY community.

The passing of Richard Siegel in 2018 (co-editor of the first volume) resulted in a significant amount of retrospective commentary on the books in the Jewish press, which included descriptions of the series as "the ultimate work of Jewish sociology evolving into practice."

== Other books inspired by The Jewish Catalog ==
- The Jewish Kid's Catalog written and illustrated by Chaya M. Burnstein and published by the Jewish Publication Society in 1983
- Getting good at getting older by Richard Siegel (one of the co-creators of the Jewish Catalog) and his wife Rabbi Laura Geller. The book was published in 2019, a year after Siegel's death.
