= Sagiv Asulin =

Former Israeli intelligence and operations officer

- Born: 15 September 1978 (age 47); Dimona
- Children: 3

Sagiv Asulin (born 15 September 1978) is a former Israeli intelligence and special operations officer, who served in the Mossad in operational and senior command roles. In his youth he served as chairman of the National Union of Israeli Students and chairman of the Students of the Mediterranean States. He leads the Eighth Front organization in Israel, is among the founders of the Jewish and non-Jewish Zionist Congress (JCZC), is a senior researcher at the Jerusalem Center for Foreign Affairs and Security (JCFA), specializes in the Iranian arena and in consciousness and influence domains, and serves as a security commentator and panelist in various media outlets.

== Biography ==
He studied at Ben-Gurion University of the Negev, earning a bachelor’s degree in politics and government and Jewish history, and later completed a master’s degree in public administration. During his academic studies he was a prominent activist in student life and young leadership.

=== Public and political activity ===
During his studies, Asulin served as chairman of the student union at Ben-Gurion University, and was later elected twice as chairman of the National Union of Israeli Students, where he led the student struggle over tuition fees and worked to expand accessibility to higher education in Israel’s periphery.

In 2004, he was elected to head the coordinating committee of the Students’ Union of Mediterranean States, a regional body representing 14 countries, including Arab states, becoming the only Israeli to hold the position.

Asulin served as a member of the tenth Council for Higher Education, during which he initiated the Charter for Students Serving in the Reserves, together with then Deputy Chief of Staff Major General Gabi Ashkenazi, and also promoted an amendment to the Higher Education Council Law allowing the granting of academic credit points for social involvement, together with Prof. Amos Rolider.

Before joining the Mossad, Asulin served as an adviser to Health Minister Danny Naveh, spokesperson for the Federation of Moroccan Jewry, and ran and won in the Likud list primaries for the 17th and 18th Knessets as a representative of the movement’s youth.

=== Security service ===
In 2010, Asulin joined the Mossad and served for 15 years in frontline operational roles and senior command positions.

After October 7, Asulin decided to leave the organization in order to lead the struggle on the “Eighth Front”: The narrative and influence front against the Jewish people, Israel, and the West, which he defined as the most significant existential threat to the future of Zionism from his perspective.

=== Research activity ===
Upon completing his service in the Mossad, Asulin joined the Jerusalem Center for Foreign Affairs and Security (JCFA) as a research fellow. In this role, he focuses on Israel–United States relations, with an emphasis on the evangelical Christian community, the Iranian arena, and the field of the “consciousness arena,” dealing with processes of influence, image, and public perception in the international arena.

His research focuses on strategic aspects of Israeli influence policy and the relationship between global public opinion and national security and foreign policy, examining ways to strengthen Israel’s standing through intercultural, faith-based, and value-oriented dialogue.

Alongside his research work, Asulin is active in the public sphere and promotes initiatives aimed at strengthening Israel’s narrative standing worldwide. He founded the first Jewish and non-Jewish Zionist Congress (JCZC) in February 2026 in Nashville, Tennessee, a congress bringing together primarily non-Jewish Zionists (mostly Christian supporters of Israel from around the world, especially the United States) representing hundreds of millions worldwide. The congress aims to create an international civic and values-based alliance operating in the fields of security, education, culture, academia, sports, social networks, and more against anti-Israeli and anti-Western campaigns seeking to challenge the legitimacy of the State of Israel and harm Jewish communities worldwide.

Asulin founded, together with Marco Moreno, the “Eighth Front” organization in Israel, whose purpose is to place the arena of consciousness and influence at the top of Israel’s security and strategic priorities.
