= Charles Kadushin =

American psychologist and professor (1932–2022)

- Born: June 5, 1932; Madison, Wisconsin, U.S.
- Died: September 21, 2022 (aged 90)
- Spouse: Ghislaine Boulanger
- Relatives: Max Kadushin (father)
- Awards: Marshall Sklare Award (2009)

Academic background
- Education: Columbia University (BA, PhD)

Academic work
- Discipline: Psychology
- Sub-discipline: Social network analysis
- Institutions: Brandeis University; Graduate Center of the City University of New York

Charles Garfiel Kadushin (June 5, 1932 – September 21, 2022) was an American psychologist and emeritus professor of psychology at the City University of New York. He was an expert in the field of social network analysis.

== Biography ==
Kadushin's parents were the Conservative rabbi Max Kadushin and the psychologist Evelyn Garfiel.

Kadushin received his A.B. from Columbia College in 1953 and Ph.D. from Columbia University in 1960. He carried out a number of large survey projects on the American intellectual elite, Vietnam veterans, and Jewish populations, especially those who partake in the Birthright Israel programs.

Kadushin was also a Visiting research professor at the department of sociology of Brandeis University and Distinguished Scholar at the Cohen Center for Modern Jewish Studies at Brandeis.

Kadushin was elected a fellow of the American Association for the Advancement of Science in 1982. He was a recipient of the 2009 Marshall Sklare Award from the Association for the Social Scientific Study of Jewry for his work on social networks.

Kadushin died on September 21, 2022.
