= Steven M. Cohen =

American sociologist

- Born: Steven M. Cohen; April 3, 1950 (age 76); Brooklyn, New York
- Citizenship: United States
- Education: Columbia College, Columbia University
- Occupations: Sociologist, Research professor
- Employer(s): Hebrew Union College - Jewish Institute of Religion; Stanford University Graduate School of Education
- Known for: Research on American Jewish identity
- Notable work: The Jew Within (2000); Sacred Strategies (2010)
- Spouse: Rabbi Marion Lev-Cohen
- Children: Adam Wall; Edeet Cohen
- Awards: Marshall Sklare Award (2010); Jewish Book Council Award (2010)

Steven M. Cohen (born April 3, 1950) is an American sociologist whose work focuses on the American Jewish community. He served as a research professor of Jewish Social Policy at Hebrew Union College-Jewish Institute of Religion and as Director of the Berman Jewish Policy Archive at Stanford University before his July 2018 resignation stemming from allegations of sexual harassment.

== Biography ==
Cohen was born April 3, 1950, in Brooklyn, New York, the son of Toby (Fassman) Cohen and Max Cohen, and the grandchild of four East European-born grandparents. Raised in a home marked by strong Jewish ethnicity and nominally Orthodox affiliation, his family kept kosher in the home only. He attended Erasmus Hall High School and then Columbia College. He made aliyah (immigrated to Israel) in 1992. He is married to Rabbi Marion Lev-Cohen. They live in both Jerusalem and New York City. He has two children.

Cohen's early intellectual influences include Leonard (Liebel) Fein, Calvin Goldscheider and Charles S. Liebman.

== Academic background ==
Cohen received his BA from Columbia College in 1970 and his Ph.D. from Columbia University's Department of Sociology in 1974. His doctoral dissertation was on "Interethnic Marriage and Friendship".

Past professorial and research positions include Queens College CUNY, Brandeis University, Hebrew University, the Jewish Theological Seminary of America, and the Melton Centre for Jewish Education. He has also served as Director of the Synagogue Studies Institute of Synagogue 3000 and Director of the Florence G. Heller-JCCA Research Center.

Cohen's research centers on the North American Jewish Community, with focus on the issues of Jewish continuity, intermarriage, and generational change. He has produced work under the auspices of various academic institutions and Jewish organizations and foundations such as the Andrea and Charles Bronfman Philanthropies, the Florence G. Heller-JCC Association Research Center, the Pew Charitable Trusts, the Jewish Agency for Israel Jewish Education Committee, and the Jewish Federations of North America.

He has been producing studies, articles, and books since he received his Ph.D. in 1974.

== Sexual harassment allegations ==
Allegations of a years-long pattern of sexual improprieties toward and harassment of female colleagues and subordinates have been made against Cohen, based on interviews with a number of sources.

Following the allegations of sexual harassment against Cohen, three scholars of American Jewish history co-authored an article in The Forward, in which they proposed a link between Cohen's alleged sexual pattern of misogynistic behavior and the conclusions of some of his sociological studies focused on the "continuity crisis." Namely, the authors Kate Rosenblatt, Ronit Stahl, and Lila Corwin Berman wrote:

"Most troubling about the data-driven mode of Jewish continuity conversations are its patriarchal, misogynistic, and anachronistic assumptions about what is good for the Jews. We learn that single women, queer people, unwed parents, and childless individuals or couples are all problems. And we learn that the Jewish community, should it want to survive, must step into the role of calling out and regulating those problems. Jewish communal leaders, in turn, learn [from the studies conducted by Cohen] that the continuity crisis — and its prescriptions about how to regulate primarily women, their bodies, and their sexuality — has its own productive energy that can be harnessed to convince donors to open their pocketbooks and support the very research and programs that prove that the crisis exists."

The cultural critic Rokhl Kafrissen has further concluded that "Cohen saw himself as an authority figure and thus entitled to the private lives and bodies of his female colleagues and subordinates, just as he saw himself entitled to dictate policy and control the fertility of American Jewish women. It becomes very hard to disentangle the sexism of an abuser from the patriarchal agenda he spent decades pushing."

Without defending Cohen's behavior, the McGill historian Professor Gil Troy, defended the broad field of continuity studies.

Following an attempt to rehabilitate Cohen's reputation through a series of scholarly gatherings, which included Cohen nearly three years after the allegations of sexual harassment against him, the Association for Jewish Studies Women's Caucus issued a statement condemning such activity on 23 March 2021, as being in conflict with the core values of the Association of Jewish Studies regarding diversity and inclusion, ethical conduct, and good faith.

== Young leadership and generational change ==
In recent years, Cohen has worked on understanding how Jewish leaders in their 20s and 30s are changing Jewish life, practices, and values. His earlier work on the Baby Boomers, served a point of contrast for his analysis in his later work on the younger generation and their approach to religious, institutional, political, and cultural norms. He has also done work on how Israel attachment is changing across generational lines, generally finding that while younger Jews still care, they feel less political connection to Israel than their older peers.

=== Selected research on young leadership and generational change ===
- Interview with Steven M. Cohen - Highly Engaged Young American Jews: Contrasts in Generational Ethos, Jerusalem Center for Public Affairs, September 15, 2010
- Cohen, Steven M.. Kelman, Ari Y.. "Uncoupled: How our Singles are Reshaping Jewish Engagement". Jewish Identity Project of Reboot. 2008
- Cohen, Steven M.. "Changes in American Jewish Identities: From Normative Constructions to Aesthetic Understandings - Interview with Steven M. Cohen". Changing Jewish Communities, No 30. Jerusalem Center for Public Affairs (JCPA). 16 March 2008
- Cohen, Steven M., Landres, J. Shawn, Kaunfer, Elie, & Shain, Michelle. Emergent Jewish communities and their participants: Preliminary findings from the 2007 National Spiritual Communities Study. New York: S3K Synagogue Studies Institute and Mechon Hadar. 2007.
- Cohen, Steven M.. Kelman, Ari Y.. "The Continuity of Discontinuity: How Young Jews Are Connecting, Creating, and Organizing Their Own Jewish Lives". 21/64. 2007
- Benjamin, Mara. Cohen, Steven M.. Wertheimer, Jack. "Peoplehood in the Next Gen". Sh'ma: A Journal of Jewish Responsibility. Jewish Family & Life (JFL Media). October 2006: 2--4.
- Cohen, Steven M.. Kelman, Ari Y.. "Cultural Events and Jewish Identities: Young Adult Jews in New York". UJA-Federation of New York. February 2005
- Cohen, Steven M.. "Changing Conceptions of Jewish Collectivity Among Young Adult Jews and Their Implications for Jewish Education: A Dual Research Project". Jewish Agency for Israel. Department of Jewish-Zionist Education. Research and Development Unit. 25 August 2002
- Cohen, Steven M.. Eisen, Arnold. "The Sovereign Self: Jewish Identity in Post-Modern America". Jerusalem Letter/Viewpoints No. 453. Jerusalem Center for Public Affairs (JCPA). 1 May 2001

=== Selected research on connections to Israel ===
- Cohen, Steven M.. Kelman, Ari Y.. "Beyond Distancing: Young Adult American Jews and Their Alienation from Israel". Jewish Identity Project of Reboot. 2007
- Abrams, Sam. Cohen, Steven M.. "Israel Off Their Minds: The Diminished Place of Israel in the Political Thinking of Young Jews". 27 October 2008
- Chazan, Barry. Cohen, Steven M.. "What We Know About American Jewish Youth and Young Adults: Some Implications for Birthright Israel". Journal of Jewish Communal Service. Jewish Communal Service Association of North America. 2000
- Cohen, Steven M.. "Did American Jews Really Grow More Distant from Israel (1983-1993)? A Re-consideration". Magnes Press (Jerusalem). 1996
- Cohen, Steven M.. Israel in the Private Sphere of Jewish Identity". Charles R. Bronfman Centre for the Israel Experience. January 1996
- Cohen, Steven M.. "Attitudes of American Jews Toward Israel and Israelis: The 1983 National Survey of American Jews and Jewish Communal Leaders". Institute on American Jewish-Israeli Relations. September 1983

== Intermarriage and Jewish continuity ==
Cohen has been a strong proponent of Jewish in-marriage: "Intermarriage does indeed constitute the greatest single threat to Jewish continuity today." His criticisms of intermarriage and its consequences for American Jews have inspired discussion and controversy.

In his 2007 article, "A Tale of Two Jewries: The `Inconvenient Truth' for American Jews," Cohen argued that inmarried and intermarried Jews form two distinct halves of the Jewish community and that the Jewish future, he argues, rests with the inmarried. Based on a 2010 study he produced for the Foundation for Jewish Camp, he challenged the idea that a lack of welcome is what is deterring interfaith households from participating in Jewish life: "There is no longer a stigma attached to walking into a synagogue with a non-Jewish spouse, but what remains a problem is that that husband or wife then does not have access to what is going on once he or she is there.". Consequently, he has challenged the value of investing in outreach to the intermarried and prefers a strategy of encouraging Jewish in-marriage and the conversion of non-Jewish spouses and partners to Judaism.

Some of Cohen's major critics on this issue include Kerry Olitzky of the Jewish Outreach Institute, Ed Case of 18Doors (formerly InterfaithFamily), Len Saxe of Brandeis University's Cohen Center, and Bethamie Horowitz of the Mandel Foundation.

=== Selected research on intermarriage and Jewish continuity ===
- Cohen, Steven M.. "Seeking a Third Way to Respond to the Challenge of Intermarriage". Central Conference of American Rabbis (CCAR). March 2008
- Cohen, Steven M.. "A Tale of Two Jewries: The "Inconvenient Truth" for American Jews". Steinhardt Foundation for Jewish Life. November 2006
- Cohen, Steven M.. "Engaging the Next Generation of American Jews: Distinguishing the In-Married, Inter-Married, and Non-Married". Journal of Jewish Communal Service. Jewish Communal Service Association of North America. 2005
- Cohen, Steven M.. "Non-Jews in Jewish Families". American Jewish Committee (AJC). 2005
- Cohen, Steven M.. "The Conversion Illusion" in Jewish Identity and Religious Commitment: The North American Study of Conservative Synagogues and Their Members, 1995-6. Jewish Theological Seminary of America (JTS) Press. 1997: 29–35
- Cohen, Steven M.. "Intermarriage and the Jewish Future". American Jewish Committee (AJC). 1997: 10–19.
- Cohen, Steven M.. "Why Intermarriage May Not Threaten Jewish Continuity". Moment Magazine. December 1994

=== Selected critiques of Cohen's position ===
- Kafrissen, Rokhl. "How A #MeToo Scandal Proved What We Already Know: ‘Jewish Continuity’ Is Sexist." The Forward. July 20, 2018.
- Rosenblatt, Kate, Lila Corwin Berman, and Ronit Stahl. "How Jewish Academia Created a #MeToo Disaster." The Forward. July 19, 2018.
- Weiner, Julie. "Steven M. Cohen Promotes "Meaningless Jewish Associations"", The New York Jewish Week: In the Mix, December 14, 2010.
- Case, Ed. "What I Would Like To Be Thankful For". InterfaithFamily.com:Network Blog. November 24, 2010.
- Berkenwald, Leah. ""Being welcoming" is an end unto itself". Jewish Women's Archive: Jewesses With Attitude. August 12, 2010
- Golin, Paul. "Continued Confusion About Intermarriage". Jewcy.com, August 5, 2010
- Weiner, Julie. "Steven M. Cohen: The Single Greatest Threat To Intermarried Jews? (Just Kidding, Steve -- Please Don't Sue For Libel!)" The New York Jewish Week: In the Mix, July 28, 2010
- Olitzky, Kerry M. Case, Ed. "There is Still Work to Be Done on Welcoming Intermarried Families." EJewish Philanthropy, August 10, 2010
- Golin, Paul. "Cohen Is Splitting the Jewish Community". The Jerusalem Post (Online Edition). Jewish Outreach Institute, The Jerusalem Post. 7 February 2007

== Other work ==
Cohen's research spans many areas, including the composition of the Jewish professional workforce, issues of gender and sexuality equity in the Jewish workplace, religious communities, and educational institutions, and the impact of various educational programs. His 2010 study, "Profiling the Professionals: Who's Serving Our Communities?", revealed that a twenty thousand dollar wage gap disparity persists between the salaries of men and women working for Jewish organizations.

=== Selected other research ===
- Gerstein, Jim, Cohen, Steven M., and Landres, J. Shawn. Connected to Give: Key Findings from the National Study of American Jewish Giving. Los Angeles: Jumpstart. 2013.
- Cohen, Steven M.. "Profiling the Professionals: Who's Serving Our Communities?". Berman Jewish Policy Archive @ NYU Wagner, Jewish Communal Service Association of North America. Fall 2010
- Aviv, Caryn. Cohen, Steven M.. Veinstein, Judith. "Welcoming Synagogues Project: Preliminary Results from the 2009 Synagogue Survey on Diversity and LGBT Inclusion". Jewish Mosaic: The National Center for Sexual and Gender Diversity, The Institute for Judaism and Sexual Orientation at Hebrew Union College-JIR. 2009
- Abrams, Sam. Cohen, Steven M.. Veinstein, Judith. "American Jews and the 2008 Presidential Election: As Democratic and Liberal as Ever?". Berman Jewish Policy Archive @ NYU Wagner. 20 October 2008
- Cohen, Steven M.. "Gender-Related Distribution of Federation Professional Positions in 2005". United Jewish Communities. Winter 2008
- Cohen, Steven M.. "Gays, Lesbians, and the Conservative Movement: The JTS Survey of Conservative Clergy, Students, Professionals, and Lay Leaders". January 2007
- Cohen, Steven M.. Hradecky, Lauren. "The 2006 Salary Survey of JCC Professionals". November 2006
- Bronznick, Shifra. Cohen, Steven M.. Goldenhar, Didi. Israel, Sherry. Kelner, Shaul. "Creating Gender Equity and Organizational Effectiveness in the Jewish Federation System: A Research-and-Action Project". Advancing Women Professionals and the Jewish Community (AWP), United Jewish Communities. January 2004
- Cohen, Steven M.. Hartman Halbertal, Tova L.. "Gender Variations in Jewish Identity: Practices and Attitudes in Conservative Congregations". Contemporary Jewry. Association for the Social Scientific Study of Jewry. January 2001: 37–64.
- Cohen, Steven M.. "The Coming Generation of Jewish Communal Professionals". The *Cohen Center for Modern Jewish Studies (CMJS). 1995
- Cohen, Steven M.. "Profiles of Leadership: A Survey of the 1994 Jewish Agency Assembly". Jewish Agency for Israel (JAFI). June 1995
- Cohen, Steven M.. "American Jewish Feminism: A Study in Conflicts and Compromises". Sage Publications, inc.. April 1980

== Awards ==
- 2010 Association for the Social Scientific Study of Jewry annual Marshall Sklare Award.
- 2010 Jewish Book Council Award Winner in the "Education and Jewish Identity" category and finalist in the "Contemporary Jewish Life and Practice" category for "Sacred Strategies: Transforming Synagogues from Functional to Visionary."
- 1997 Abraham Cahan Prize in Jewish Journalism, for best article in Jewish journalism in 1996 (with Jack Wertheimer and Charles S. Liebman)
