= Leonard Sax (disambiguation) =

Leonard (or Lenny) Sax (or Saxe, Sachs) may refer to:

- Leonard Saxe (born 1947), American social psychologist, especially concerning the American Jewish community
- Leonard Sax, American psychologist and physician, author of books for parents
- Leonard Sachs (1909–1990), British actor
- Lenny Sachs (1897–1942), American football and basketball player and coach
