= Nate Bloom =

American columnist and genealogist

- Occupations: Genealogist; Columnist

Nate Bloom is an American columnist and genealogist focusing on Jewish genealogy.

Bloom writes a syndicated column on Jewish celebrities that appears in Jewish-oriented newspapers, including American Israelite, Cleveland Jewish News, Detroit Jewish News, New Jersey Jewish Standard, Tampa Jewish Federation News, 18Doors (formerly InterfaithFamily), J. The Jewish News of Northern California, JWeekly, and Jewish World Review. He lives in Oakland, California. He is often cited by major publications and books for his research on Jewish celebrities and public figures. In Bloom's columns, he researches whether a celebrity is of full or partial Jewish descent if they were raised in Judaism or another faith, what faith the practice as an adult, and whether they are converts; those deemed Jewish are indicated in the column by bold type.
