= Havurat Shalom =

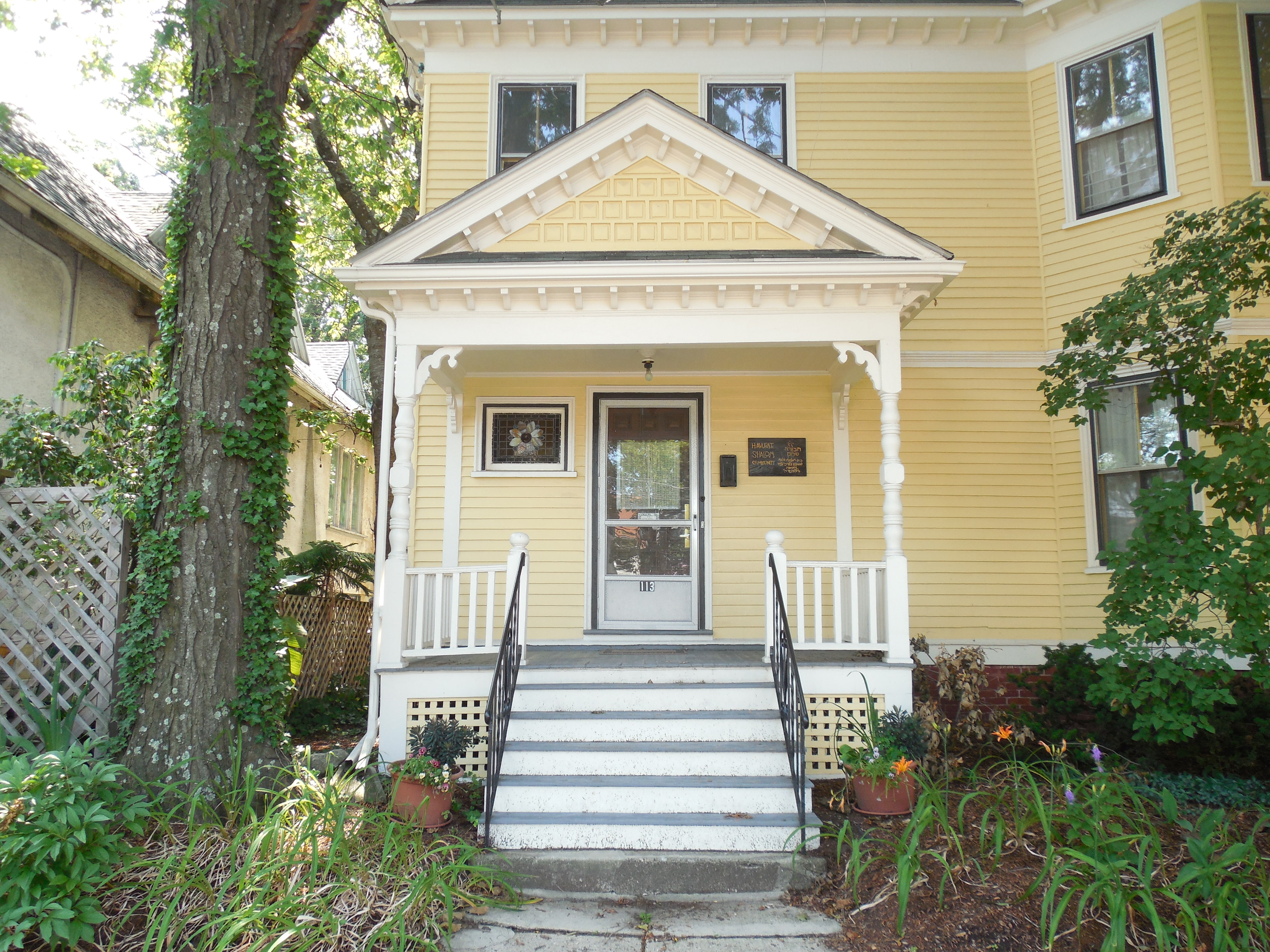
- Founded: 1968; 58 years ago
- Purpose: A lay-led congregation where people come to pray, celebrate, and grapple with Jewish texts and traditions and work for social justice.
- Location: Somerville, Massachusetts, U.S.
- Coordinates: 42°23′59.14″N 71°7′5.20″W
- Website: www.thehav.org

Havurat Shalom is a small egalitarian chavurah in Somerville, Massachusetts. Founded in 1968, it is not affiliated with any of the major Jewish denominations.

Havurat Shalom was the first non-affiliated Jewish religious community and set the precedent for the chavurah movement. Founded in 1968, it was also significant in the development of Jewish Renewal and Jewish feminism. Originally intended to be an "alternative seminary", instead it evolved into a "model havurah".

Founders and members of Havurat Shalom have included Edward Feld, Merle Feld, Michael Fishbane, Everett Gendler, Arthur Green, Barry Holtz, Gershon Hundert, James Kugel, Alfred A. Marcus, Zalman Schachter-Shalomi, Jim Sleeper, Michael Strassfeld, and Arthur Waskow. Historian Jonathan Sarna noted that among these members were "the people who would be leading figures in Jewish life in the second half of the 20th century".
