= Arnold Eisen =

American Judaic scholar

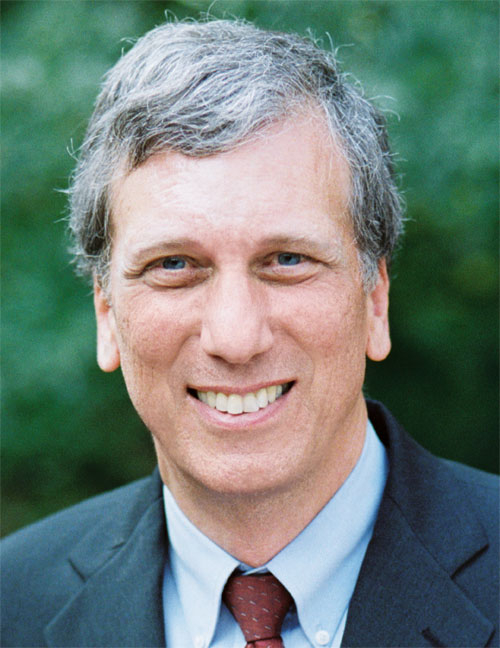
Arnold M. Eisen

Arnold M. Eisen (born 1951) is an American Judaic scholar who was Chancellor of the Jewish Theological Seminary in New York. He stepped down at the end of the 2019-2020 academic year. Prior to this appointment, he served as the Koshland Professor of Jewish Culture and Religion and chair of the Department of Religious Studies at Stanford University. Prior to joining the Stanford faculty in 1986, he taught at Tel Aviv University and Columbia University.

== The Jewish Theological Seminary ==
In 2006, Eisen was appointed as the seventh chancellor of The Jewish Theological Seminary, replacing Ismar Schorsch. Eisen is the second non-rabbi, after Cyrus Adler, to hold this post. He is also the first person with a social science background to serve as chancellor; previous chancellors had backgrounds in Jewish history or Talmud. He took office as chancellor-elect on July 1, 2007, the day after Schorsch stepped down, and assumed the position full-time on July 1, 2008.

Eisen's tenure was marked by growth at JTS, including a new campus, but it was not without controversy or criticism.

== Scholarship and training ==
Eisen served in the Department of Religious Studies at Stanford University, the Department of Jewish Philosophy at Tel Aviv University, and the Department of Religion at Columbia University. Eisen earned a PhD in the History of Jewish Thought from Hebrew University, a BPhil in the Sociology of Religion at Oxford University, and a BA in Religious Thought from the University of Pennsylvania. He was a student of Professor Samuel Tobias Lachs. He previously served as senior lecturer at the Tel Aviv University and assistant professor at Columbia University.

== Religious change ==
He believes that American Jews feel connected to Jewish ritual but maintain autonomy to decide what to practice and thus many do not attend synagogue regularly.

Eisen is a recognized expert in religious change and the modern transformation of Jewish religious belief and practice. He is also one of the world's foremost experts in the sociology of American Judaism. For the past twenty years, he has worked closely with synagogue and federation leadership around the country to analyze and address the issues of Jewish identity, the revitalization of Jewish tradition, and the redefinition of the American Jewish community.

== Personal life ==
Eisen sits on the board of directors of the Tanenbaum Center, the Covenant Foundation, and the Taube Foundation, and chairs the steering committee of the Academic Consortium. He is married to Adriane Leveen, a professor of the Hebrew Bible (Tanakh) at the Reform Judaism movement's Hebrew Union College. They have two children together .

== Works ==
His recent publications include a personal essay, Taking Hold of Torah: Jewish Commitment and Community in America (1997), which addresses the renewal of Jewish community and commitment in America through a series of five essays built around the Five Books of Moses; a historical work about the origins of contemporary dilemmas concerning these issues, entitled Rethinking Modern Judaism: Ritual, Commandment, Community (1998); and The Jew Within: Self, Family and Community in America (2000), co-authored with sociologist Steven M. Cohen (2000), which examines the meanings of Judaism and Jewish belonging to contemporary American Jews.

- Galut: Modern Jewish Reflection on Homelessness and Homecoming, Indiana University Press (Bloomington), 1986
- Rethinking Modern Judaism: Ritual, Commandment, Community, University of Chicago Press (Chicago), 1998. (Koret Jewish Book Award, 1999)
- The Jew Within: Self, Family, and Community in America
- The Chosen People in America: A Study in Jewish Religious Ideology, Indiana University Press (Bloomington), 1983.
- (Author of commentary) Michael Strassfeld, The Jewish Holidays: A Guide and Commentary, Harper & Row (New York City), 1985.
- Taking Hold of Torah: Jewish Commitment and Community in America, Indiana University Press (Bloomington), 1997.
- (With Steven M. Cohen) The Jew Within: Self, Family, and Community in America, Indiana University Press, 2000
- Seeking the Hiding God: A Personal Theological Essay, Ben Yehuda Press (Teaneck, New Jersey), 2024.

== Awards ==
- National Jewish Book Award, 1987, for Galut
- National Jewish Book Award, Koret Foundation, 1998, for Rethinking Modern Judaism
- Koret Prize, 1999, for outstanding contributions to the Jewish community
- Marshall Sklare Award, 2018
