= Amir Segal =

Israeli poet and sociologist

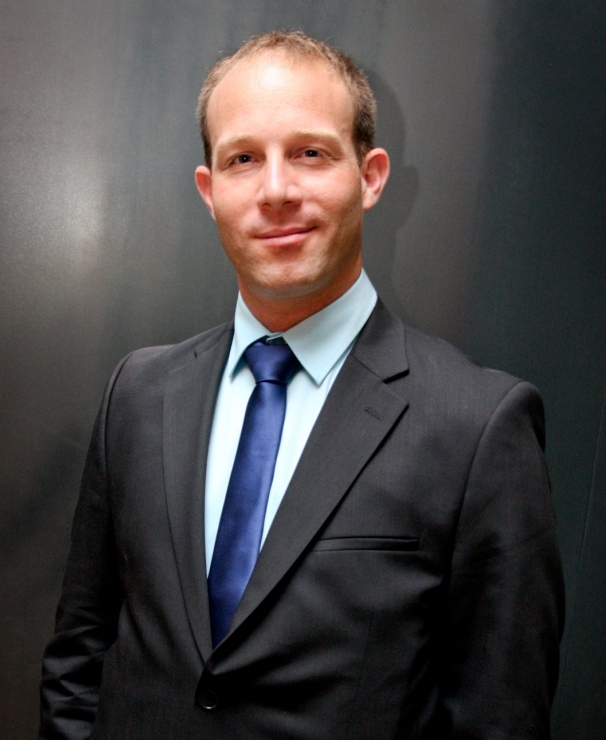

Amir Akiva Segal (Hebrew: עמיר עקיבא סגל; born in 1980 in Tzippori) is an Israeli poet, literary critic, and sociologist.

== Early life and education ==
Segal was born in 1980 in Tzippori, Israel. He studied sociology and completed his doctoral studies at the Hebrew University of Jerusalem. His doctoral research examined transnational migration to Israel, with a particular focus on North American Jewish migrants and their integration into professional and organizational fields.

== Academic career ==
In the middle of 2023, Segal began serving as a research fellow at the Institute for Immigration and Social Integration at the Ruppin Academic Center and as a lecturer at the Israeli branch of the International University of Economics and Business. In the same year, he published two articles based on his doctoral dissertation, one of which dealt with Israeli baseball and the influence of immigrants from the United States on the assimilation of the game in Israel. (Note: Homeland Run: Israeli Baseball and American Transmigrants) The second one dealt with immigrants from the United States and Canada working in Israel as fundraisers . (Note: Transnational Immigrants Encounter the Workplace: North American Jewish Migrants in Israel Who Work in Fundraising Transmigrants) Segal serves as a board member of the Association for Israel Studies and Association for the Social Scientific Study of Jewry.

Segal's academic work focuses on transnational migration, diaspora studies, and the relationship between civil society and political processes. He completed his doctoral studies at the Hebrew University of Jerusalem, where his research examined transnational migrant employment in Israel, with a particular focus on North American Jewish migrants working in fields such as fundraising, politics, and sports.

Since 2025, Segal has been a Minerva Stiftung Postdoctoral Fellow at the Institute of Sociology at Freie Universität Berlin, where he has researched diaspora relations and transnational political engagement, examining how diasporic communities interact with both their countries of origin and their host societies during periods of political upheaval. His current research examines Israeli communities in Europe, focusing on diaspora politics, transnational political engagement, emotional transnationalism, and the organizational dynamics linking diasporic communities, host societies, and Israel.

His broader research interests include Jewish migration, philanthropy, and the transnational circulation of political and cultural ideas. In his academic publications, Segal has explored topics such as the Americanization of Israeli civil society and the role of diaspora networks in shaping political and organizational dynamics.

== Literary activity ==
In addition to his academic work, Segal is active as a poet and literary critic. His poetry engages with themes of identity, politics, and contemporary Israeli culture. He has published several poetry collections and has written essays on political poetry and literary expression in Israel. His literary work has appeared in various journals and cultural platforms, and he has been involved in public debates on literature, politics, and society.

Segal's poems have been published in several journals, including "Iton 77", "Maayan" and "Mita'am", and Shvo.

He produced and presented the radio program "Shirat Mecha'a" at "All for Peace" radio station, dealing with Israeli protest songs and poetry.

He was editor and host of a series of evenings "Song of Pain" that dealt with protest songs at Beit Avi Chai in Jerusalem.

Since 2013, he has published a weekly poetry review column in the Kav LaMoshav. Segal was named "the most important poetry critic in Israel today" by Ilan Berkovich.

After years of writing primarily about Hebrew poetry and literature, Segal expanded his work to include popular culture, with a particular focus on science fiction films and television series. His essays examine these works as platforms for exploring questions of humanity, society, identity, and broader sociological themes. Among other venues, he has published essays in PopMatters and Bright Lights Film Journal, discussing topics such as the Marvel Cinematic Universe, Star Trek: Voyager, and the sociological dimensions of science fiction.

== Writing on popular culture ==
In parallel to his academic research and literary work, Segal writes on popular culture, with a particular focus on film, television, and digital media. His essays have been published in PopMatters, where he analyzes contemporary cultural production through a sociological lens.

His writing often engages with science fiction and speculative media, examining how popular narratives reflect and shape social expectations, political imaginaries, and collective anxieties. Among his essays are analyses of the Marvel Cinematic Universe, Star Trek, and contemporary science fiction television.

This line of work complements his academic research on migration, diaspora studies, and transnational processes, as well as his engagement with interviews and political poetry, extending his sociological analysis into the domain of popular culture.

== Personal life ==
Segal is married to Anya Zhuravel Segal.

== Books ==
- On My Return From the Reserves, Gvanim, 2008, poetry
- The Other Land, Iton 77 Publishers, 2014, poetry
- Song of America, Iton 77, 2017, a novel.
- The End of the Twentieth Century, Iton 77, 2020, Poetry.
- Protest Poetry in Israel - in the Beginning of the Twenty-First Century, November Books, 2023, nonfiction.
- Our Words are Silence, Iton 77, 2025, Poetry.

=== Academic publications ===
- Segal, Amir Akiva (2024). "The Advantages of Online Interviews for Transmigrants and Transnational Migration Studies." American Journal of Qualitative Research. 8 (3): 139–152.
- Segal, Amir Akiva; Greenspan, I. (2024). "The Creation and Americanization of Israeli Conservative Civil Society: Critical Community and Transnational Transference." Israel Studies Review. 29 (2): 144–169.
- Segal, Amir Akiva (2023). "Homeland Run: Israeli Baseball and American Transmigrants." Contemporary Jewry. 43 (1): 97–120.

== Awards ==
- Awarded the Rafi Farbman Young Poets Award in 2011.
- Recipient of the Harry Hershon literature award from the Hebrew University of Jerusalem in 2014.
