= Leonard Saxe =

American social psychologist (born 1947)

- Education: University of Pittsburgh (PhD, 1975)
- Scientific career
- Fields: Psychology, sociology of religion, demography
- Workplaces: Brandeis University

Leonard Saxe (born June 12, 1947) is an American social psychologist whose work focuses on social psychology, sociology of religion, and American Jewry. He is currently the Klutznick Professor of Contemporary Jewish Studies and Social Policy at Brandeis University and the director of the Cohen Center for Modern Jewish Studies and the Steinhardt Social Research Institute at Brandeis.

== Polygraph research and critiques ==
Saxe’s research has been influential in the scientific evaluation of polygraph testing and its validity. In 1985, Saxe co-authored The Validity of Polygraph Testing: Scientific Analysis and Public Controversy, a peer reviewed article assessing the theoretical foundations and empirical evidence for polygraph use. This work concluded that serious problems exist in both the rationale and supporting evidence for polygraph accuracy, particularly for proposed government screening applications, and highlighted limitations in the scientific support for claims of high validity.

Saxe was a principal investigator on broader scientific evaluations of polygraph testing, including a comprehensive review examining the nature and application of polygraph assessments. These evaluations determined that the polygraph instrument itself does not detect deception but instead records physiological responses that must be interpreted by examiners, and that available scientific evidence is insufficient to establish general validity across contexts.

In collaboration with Gershon Ben-Shakhar, Saxe also examined the admissibility of polygraph evidence in legal settings, arguing that traditional standards for scientific evidence (such as those outlined in Daubert v. Merrell Dow Pharmaceuticals, Inc.) reveal a lack of methodological support for polygraph reliability and consistency.

Saxe’s research has been cited in discussions of public policy and legislation related to polygraph use, including debates over the reliability of polygraph evidence in court and its role in employment screening, underscoring the scientific controversy surrounding polygraph testing.

== Sociological research ==
Saxe has conducted a number of studies on the American Jewish community. Saxe's research points to a more positive outlook on concerns of the American Jewish community. His figures show larger than previously reported estimates of the population size of American Jewry.

=== 2010 Census of American Jews ===
In 2010, Saxe, along with sociologists Elizabeth Tighe and Charles Kadushin published their secondary data findings from local Jewish community studies. Their findings were intended to act as a census of American Jews, as the National Jewish Population Survey had been cancelled due to budget constraints.

=== Birthright-Taglit studies ===
Saxe has conducted a number of studies on the effect of the Birthright-Taglit program on young American Jews.

== Awards ==
In 2012, Saxe was the recipient of the ASSJ's Marshall Sklare Award for his contributions to the social scientific study of contemporary Jewry.

== See also ==
- Brandeis University
- Berman Jewish Policy Archive
