= Birthright Israel =

Jewish heritage organization

Taglit-Birthright Israel
- Formation: 1999; 27 years ago
- Purpose: Jewish heritage trip
- Headquarters: United States
- President and CEO: Israel Tapoohi
- Chair: Michael Rashes
- Budget: $92.9 million (2023)
- Website: birthrightisrael.com

Taglit-Birthright Israel (Hebrew: תגלית) is a free ten-day heritage trip to Israel, Jerusalem, and the Golan Heights for young adults of Jewish heritage between the ages of 18 and 26. The program is sponsored by the Birthright Israel Foundation, whose donors subsidize participation.

Taglit is the Hebrew word for 'discovery'. During their trip, participants, most of whom are visiting Israel for the first time, are encouraged to discover new meaning in their personal Jewish identity and connection to Jewish history and culture.

Since the program's first trip in 1999, more than 900,000 young Jews from 68 countries in the Jewish diaspora have participated in Birthright Israel. It is the largest educational tourism organization in the world.

Participation in Birthright Israel has been called a rite of passage for young Jews. Pew Research estimated that by 2020, around 20 percent of American Jews ages 18–46 had participated in Birthright. Israel Hayom has described Birthright as the most influential organization in relations between Israel and the Jewish diaspora.

== History ==
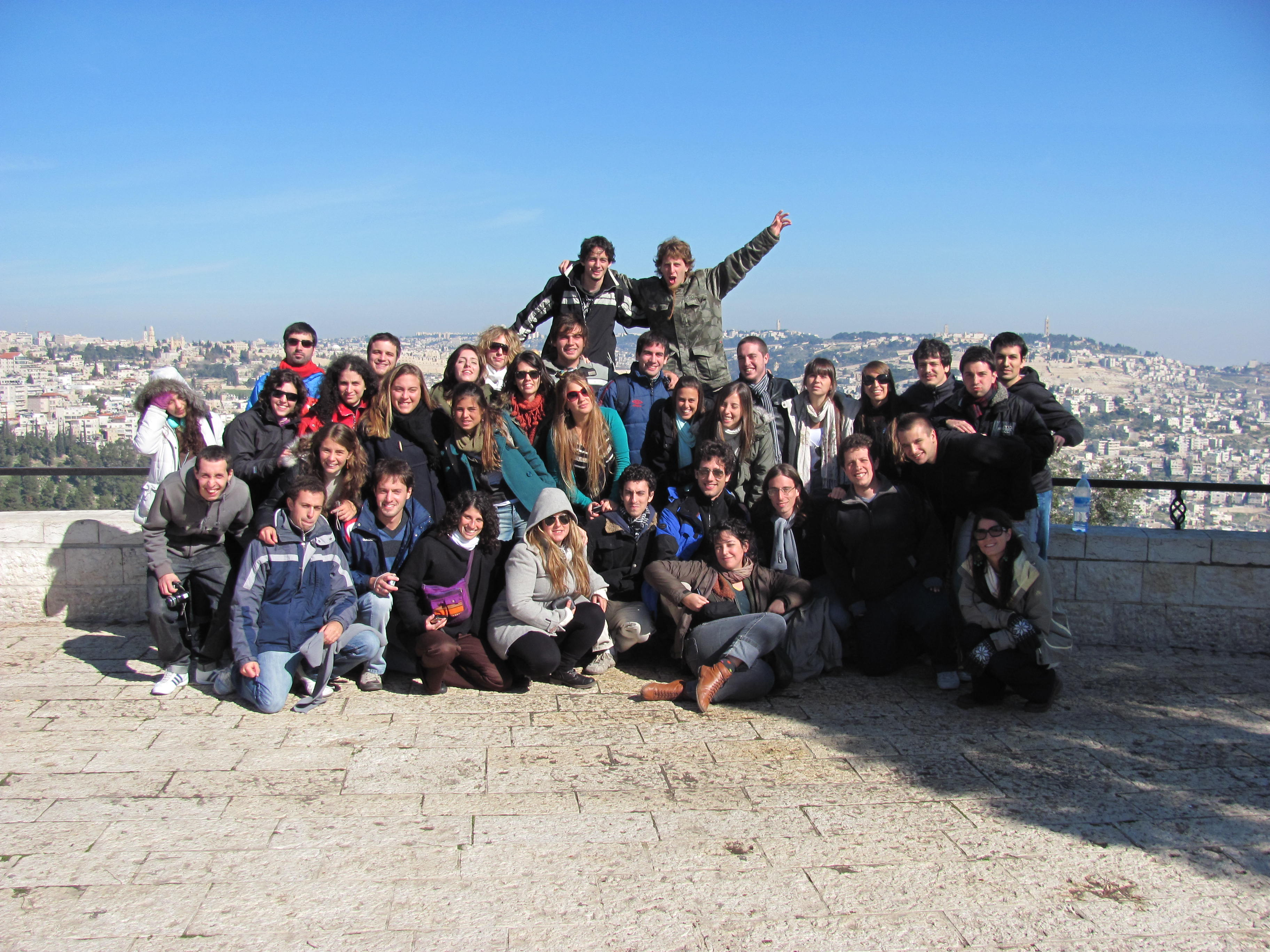
Birthright Israel delegation, winter 2012

The Birthright Israel program was founded in 1994 by philanthropists Charles Bronfman and Michael Steinhardt in cooperation with the Israeli government, the Jewish Agency for Israel, and Jewish diaspora communities, with the first program trip in 1999. The purpose of Birthright was to strengthen diaspora Jews' connection to Israel and increase a sense of Jewish identity, in response to the 1990 National Jewish Population Survey.

By 2007, annual capacity had increased to 20,000 participants a year. That year, the late Sheldon Adelson pledged $25 million to Birthright Israel to take applicants off waiting lists and to increase annual capacity to 37,000 for 2007 and 2008.

Birthright launched Birthright NEXT in 2007 as a post-trip follow-up program. One NEXT initiative was I.D., in which Birthright Israel alumni would perform monologues based on their experiences. Ultimately, a lack of funding for alumni programs in the face of an increased emphasis on youth Israel trips led NEXT to shut down by 2015.

In 2010, Birthright launched an extension program called Birthright Excel. Birthright Excel is a 10-week summer program where students can either create a venture or intern with a business.

The number of participants averaged approximately 45,000 per year, with about 80 percent from the United States and Canada. After peaking at more than 48,000 participants in 2018, only 35,000 participants attended a Birthright Israel trip in 2022. Due to budgetary cuts, only 23,500 participants were anticipated to participate in the program in 2023.

In 2022, Birthright Israel merged with Onward Israel, part of the Jewish Agency, which offers programs for young adults to travel to Israel for 6 to 10 weeks to live, work and study.

In 2023, Birthright had its first second-generation participant.

Since the program's first trip in 1999, more than 900,000 young Jews from 68 countries in the Jewish diaspora have participated in Birthright Israel.

== Eligibility ==
To participate, individuals must have at least one parent of recognized Jewish descent or who have converted to Judaism through a recognized Jewish movement, and who do not actively practice another religion. They must also be between the ages of 18 and 26, have completed high school, have never traveled to Israel on a peer educational trip or study program after the age of 18, and have not lived in Israel for more than three months after the age of 12.

Between 2017 and 2022, Birthright raised the upper age limit for eligibility to 32 to reflect the broader cultural shift of young adults delaying major life decisions like getting married and having children.

== Trip organizers ==
Trips are organized by different organizations and companies accredited by Birthright Israel, which sets the logistical, educational, and security standards. All groups are led by licensed Israeli tour guides and are accompanied by an armed security guard. Tours may vary according to age group and the religious background of the participants. Trips may be geared for graduate students, undergraduates at a particular university, participants from a particular city, participants who identify with a particular stream of Judaism, tours for hiking or music enthusiasts, and a diverse array of other interests, such as trips for the LGBTQ community, campus trips and accessibility trips.

El Al, Israel's largest airline company, is the major operator of the trips' flights.

== Trip details ==
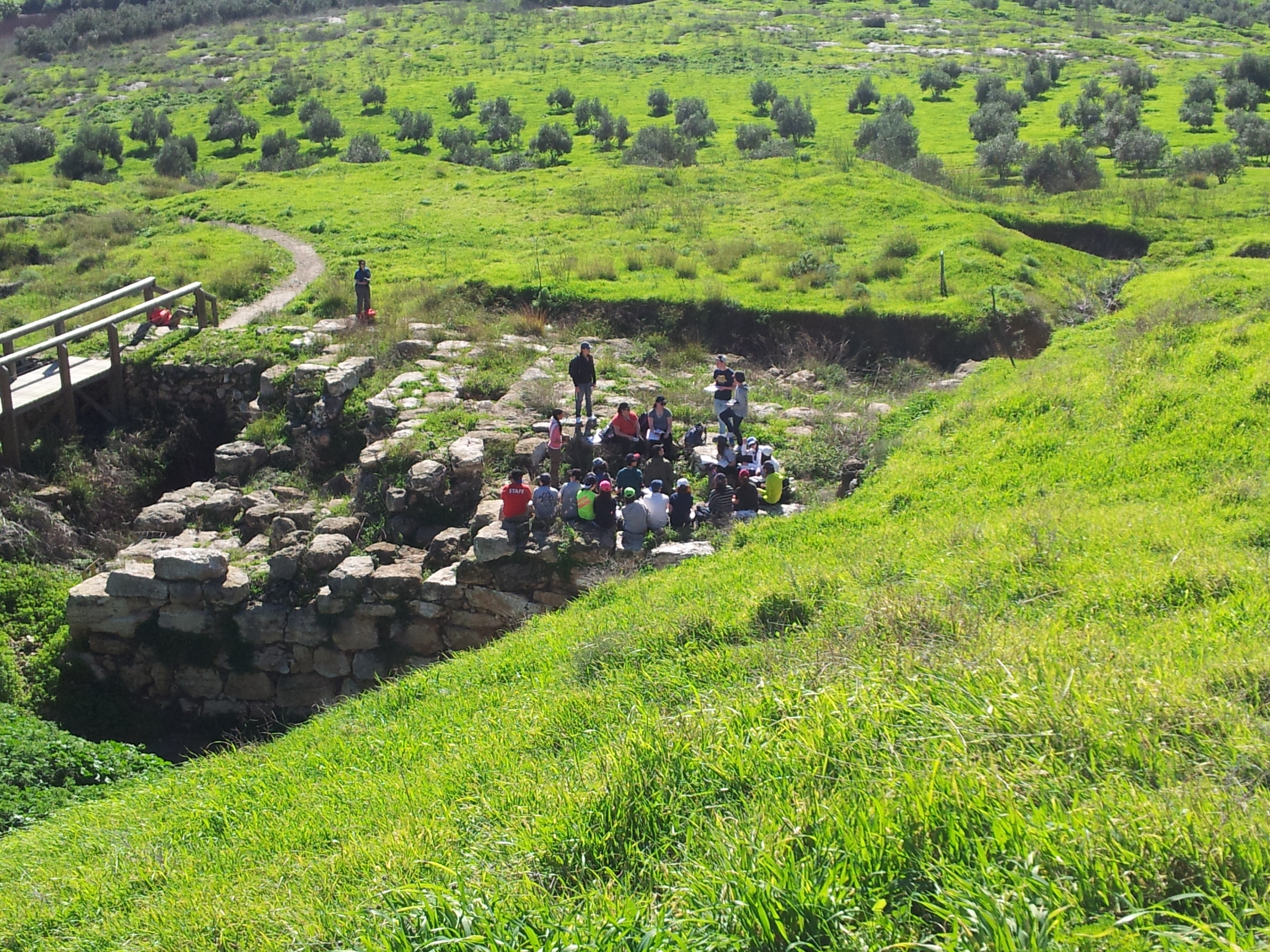
Archaeological site Tel Gezer with Birthright tourists, February 2013

A Birthright Israel trip lasts for 10 days, including travel to and from Israel. Tours travel throughout Israel and Jerusalem to religious and cultural sites, including the Western Wall and the Dead Sea. Trips also often include a Mega Event for all participants featuring speeches by dignitaries, including the Israeli prime minister, and musical performances by popular Israeli artists.

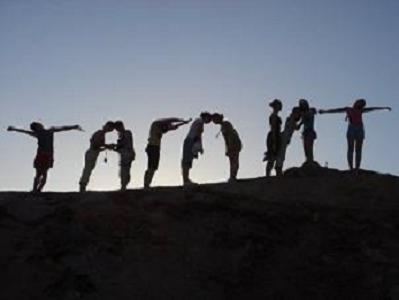
A Russian Taglit group in Israel, 2008 using their bodies to "write" ТАГЛИТ, the Russian transcription of Taglit

The tours also include a 5- to 10-day mifgash (Hebrew for 'encounter') with Israeli peers, usually soldiers serving in the Israel Defense Forces. The stated purpose for the mifgash is for the participants and the soldiers to get to know each other and to better understand each other's worldview and Jewish identity. Guided discussion sessions explore topics such as the Jewish tradition in the modern world, how Jewish life in Israel differs from Jewish life abroad, and how mandatory military service impacts young Israelis' perceptions of service and commitment to their country. More than 115,000 Israelis have participated in the mifgash program since 2000.

== Funding ==
The cost for each participant, approximately $4,500 as of 2020, is covered by a variety of funding sources. According to Birthright Israel, 67 percent of funding comes from individual donors, 27 percent from the Israeli government, 3 percent from Jewish federations, and 3 percent from the Jewish Agency.

The program's largest individual donors have included Sheldon Adelson and Miriam Adelson, who gave more than $250 million to Birthright Israel by 2015. Other major donors include prominent philanthropists Charles Bronfman, Edgar Bronfman Sr., Daniel Och, Marlene Post, Lynn Schusterman, and Michael Steinhardt. The program also receives funding from the German government through the Conference on Jewish Material Claims Against Germany.

== Impact and criticism ==
=== Impact on Jewish identity ===
Participation in Birthright Israel has been called a rite of passage for young Jews. Pew Research estimated that by 2020, around 20 percent of American Jews ages 18–46 had participated in Birthright. Birthright has been called the most influential organization in relations between Israel and the Jewish diaspora.

Leonard Saxe of Brandeis University's Cohen Center for Modern Jewish Studies has evaluated the program's impact since its inception in 1999. As of 2020, findings include:

- Birthright participants were 16 percentage points more likely to have a Jewish partner than similar nonparticipants.
- Birthright increased participants’ likelihood of engagement in Jewish life.
- One out of four Birthright participants marry another Birthright participant.

Sociologist Shaul Kelner of Vanderbilt University described Birthright Israel as a "diaspora-building enterprise" to "ensure the continued existence of vibrant, Israel-oriented Jewish communities abroad".

According to a Pew Research study in 2020, there was an 85 percent increase in American participants who reported attachment to Israel after the trip, a 54 percent increase in feelings of belonging to the Jewish people, and a 58 percent increase in feeling closer to their Israeli counterparts. In addition, there was an 160 percent increase in participants' desire to have a Jewish spouse.

=== Criticism ===
Birthright trips have been described as a form of propaganda. Jewish Currents wrote, "Birthright has served as one of the most effective propaganda campaigns on behalf of the Israeli government and its occupation of the Palestinian territories." The organization has been scrutinized for the large proportion of its funding coming from major Trump and Netanyahu backer Adelson.

In 2006, Salon.com alleged that Birthright Israel screened out applicants for political reasons. Birthright Israel claims it does not ask applicants for their political views.

The pro-Palestinian Jewish Voice for Peace runs a campaign called Return the Birthright, which criticizes the Birthright Israel program and urges young Jews to boycott it, stating: "it's unjust that we get a free Birthright trip, while Palestinian refugees can't return to their homes."

In recent years, Birthright has added optional activities involving Israeli Arabs.

=== Impact on Israeli economy ===
According to a study by Ernst and Young, Birthright Israel had contributed more than $1.1 billion to the Israeli economy by 2016, including $840 million in hotel, tourism, and flights revenue, and $325 million in participant spending. During the two main period when Birthright trips are operating, Birthright participants make up as many as 12 percent of tourists in the country.

The cancellation of Birthright and other heritage trips due to COVID-19 cost the Israeli economy $200 million, according to Calcalist.

=== Inspiration for other heritage trips ===
Birthright Israel has inspired similar heritage programs for other diasporas, including Birthright Armenia for the Armenian diaspora, ReConnect Hungary for young adults of the Hungarian diaspora in the U.S. and Canada, Birthright Greece for the Greek diaspora, and Domovina Birthright Program for Croatians. Birthright also loosely inspired CubaOne Foundation for Cuban-Americans and Birthright Africa for young Americans of African descent, which was founded in 2015.

In 2022, college basketball coach Bruce Pearl launched "Birthright for College Basketball", a 10-day trip bringing American college men's basketball teams to Israel. In 2023, the trip included a stop in the United Arab Emirates.

== Notable participants ==
- Jamie-Lynn Sigler, actress
- Ethan Klein, podcaster
- Jonathan Lipnicki, actor
- Abbi Jacobson, actress
- Max Steinberg, IDF soldier killed during the 2014 Gaza war
- Casey Neistat, YouTuber
- Gianmarco Soresi, comedian
- Montana Tucker, influencer
- Doctor Mike, physician
- Jonah Platt, actor
- Otto Warmbier, student imprisoned by North Korea

== See also ==
- Diaspora politics
- Jewish diaspora
- Jewish education
- The Bronfman Fellowship – Program bringing young Israelis to visit the United States
- Love Boat – Analogous program for the Republic of China and Overseas Chinese youth
- Nefesh B'Nefesh
- Tourism in Israel
  - Heritage tourism
  - Genealogy tourism
- Hakhshara
- Youth village
