= Joy Levitt =

American rabbi

Joy Levitt is an American rabbi, and from 1987 to 1989 was the first female president of the Reconstructionist Rabbinical Association.

== Education ==
In 1975 Levitt received a bachelor's degree from Barnard College; she later received a master's degree from New York University in 1976, and a rabbinical degree from the Reconstructionist Rabbinical College in 1981.

== Career ==
As a pulpit rabbi, Levitt served Congregation B'nei Keshet in Montclair, New Jersey and the Reconstructionist Synagogue of the North Shore in Plandome, New York.

She was an associate executive director, executive director, and CEO of the Manhattan Jewish Community Center from 1998-2021.

In 2024 she became the executive director of the Jerusalem Foundation.

== Editing ==
Levitt and her husband Rabbi Michael Strassfeld are coeditors of A Night of Questions, published by the Reconstructionist Press in 2000.

== Honors ==
In 2010 Levitt was named one of fifty of the most influential rabbis in America by The Sisterhood, The Jewish Daily Forward's women's issues blog.

In 2010 and 2011 she was named by Newsweek as one of the most influential rabbis in America.

== See also ==
- Timeline of women rabbis
