= Israel Tapoohi =

Israeli-Australian businessman

Israel "Izzy" Tapoohi ישראל "איזי" תפוחי
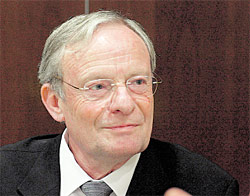
- Citizenship: Israeli & Australian
- Education: Bachelors in Business Administration Accounting and Economics from University of Melbourne Coursework in Computerization of Financial Systems from University of Melbourne Coursework in Tax and Company Law from Royal Melbourne Institute of Technology Coursework in Commercial, Company and Tax Law from Royal Melbourne Institute of Technology
- Occupations: Former president and CEO, Development Corp. for Israel/Israel Bonds (October 2011-October 2016) Chairman of Tel Aviv Centennial Properties Ltd. Former Chairman of Bezeq Israel Telecom Ltd. (BEZQ.TA) Former Chairman of Africa-Israel Investments Ltd. (AFIL.TA) Former Deputy CEO of Pioneer Ltd.

Israel "Izzy" Tapoohi (Hebrew: ישראל "איזי" תפוחי) is the President and Chief Executive Officer of Birthright Israel Foundation, the non-profit organization that raises funds in the US to support Birthright Israel trips.

Tapoohi joined Birthright Israel Foundation after serving as President and CEO of Development Corporation for Israel Bonds from October 2011 - October 2016.

Prior to Israel Bonds, Tapoohi held director positions on the boards of leading Israeli and international companies, including Bezeq, Israel's largest telecommunications provider, and Africa-Israel Investments Ltd., an international holdings and investments group. He has been appointed to top-level advisory positions, including with the first and second Netanyahu governments, and has been involved with real estate and venture capital investments.

Born in Israel and raised in Australia, Tapoohi immigrated to Israel with his family in 1979.

== Australia ==
Tapoohi, a certified accountant by training, began his professional career in 1970 at the Australian branch of Westinghouse Electric Corporation. In 1972, he joined the Australian subsidiary of Dutch company Philips Electronics.

He was eventually appointed group financial controller of Philips Australia in Sydney in 1977, and, concurrently, was a member of the Committee for Current Cost Accounting of the Institute of Chartered Accountants of Australia.

== Israel ==
Following his emigration in 1979, Tapoohi joined the auditing firm Luboshitz-Kasierer & Co. In 1981, Tapoohi was accepted to the Institute of Certified Public Accountants in Israel.

Three years later, he was appointed chief financial officer and company secretary of Pioneer Israel – one of the country's 100 largest companies – operator of concrete plants, quarries, asphalt plants and vehicles to transport raw materials for construction. Tapoohi was also involved in the activities of the parent company, Pioneer International, dealing with international financing, dividend planning, and acquisition of businesses, particularly during the privatization process in Eastern Europe.

In 1996, Tapoohi was named chairman of the board Africa-Israel Investments Ltd. and, in 1997, was appointed executive chairman of the board of Bezeq , a position he retained until July 2000. During his tenure at Bezeq, Israel's largest communications provider, and, at the time, the country's largest corporation, Tapoohi guided the company through increasing competition in the international telecommunications market and began preparations for the telecom giant's privatization, completed in 2005.

In July 2000, Tapoohi founded InQSOFT, which evaluated and recommended investments in early-stage high-tech startups to top-level international investors. Tapoohi was InQSOFT CEO until 2004.

From 2002 to 2008, Tapoohi served on the board of directors and was chairman of the audit committee for Strauss Group Ltd . In the latter capacity, Tapoohi was closely involved in the company's merger with Elite, one of the most complex corporate mergers in Israel of the past decade.

He was director of Israel Electric Corporation from 2004 to 2007 and a member of the board of directors of Tadiran Communications Ltd. in 2005.

Tapoohi also served on the boards and chaired the audit committees of Harel Insurance Investments Ltd., Shikun VeBinui Holdings Ltd., and Menora Mivtachim Holdings Ltd.

He was a member of the boards of Menora Mivtachim Insurance Ltd. , Paz Oil Company Ltd. , and Paz Ashdod Refinery Ltd.

In early 2007, Tapoohi, together with a number of prominent Israeli business leaders, established More Group International Real Estate, which developed real estate in Eastern Europe, primarily Montenegro.

In June 2010, Tapoohi was appointed chairman of Tel Aviv Centennial Properties Ltd., a company investing in and managing retail properties in central Tel Aviv.

== Public service ==
Tapoohi has held a number of key advisory positions, all of which were on a volunteer basis. From 1996 to 1999 he was Benjamin Netanyahu's liaison to foreign investors and coordinated the think-tank that advised the prime minister's office on economic policy.

During this same period, Tapoohi was the Likud Party treasurer, also on a voluntary basis, from May 1993 through April 1997, and, in 1998, co-chaired the 50th Anniversary Jubilee Conference for Business Investment in Israel.

As part of the formation of the second Netanyahu government in March 2009, Tapoohi was appointed to the '100 Days Team.' Together with Finance Minister Yuval Steinitz, Tapoohi developed guidelines and policies to keep Israel's economy resilient in the face of ongoing global recession. From May 2009 to May 2011, Tapoohi was part of a forum of businessmen, economists and academics advising the Finance Ministry on macro-economic policy.

Tapoohi was a member of the Council and Advisory Committee of the Bank of Israel and the Committee of the Association of Publicly Listed Companies on the Tel Aviv Stock Exchange. He also sat on the Weizmann Institute's board of governors.

Tapoohi was a member of the directorate of the Israel-Australia Chamber of Commerce, the Israel-Switzerland Chamber of Commerce, and the Israel-British Business Council. Through December 2010, Tapoohi was a member of the directorate of the Israel-British Chamber of Commerce, and, from 2004 to 2006, was a member of the Israel-America Chamber of Commerce.

== Israel Bonds ==
Following a recommendation from then-Finance Minister Steinitz, the board of directors of Development Corporation for Israel approved Tapoohi's appointment as president and CEO. He officially began his new role October 31, 2011.

During his time with the organization, Tapoohi stressed the strength of Israel's economy. In an interview published November 4, 2014, on Bloomberg.com, Tapoohi said, “It’s an economic narrative that we’re giving today, and not a geopolitical one.”

The Bloomberg article noted Tapoohi's use of technology to assist Bonds registered representatives in increasing annual U.S. sales. In 2013 and ’14, domestic sales exceeded $1.1 billion, with reinvestment rates of approximately 60 percent. U.S. sales again exceeded $1 billion in 2015.

Previously, in an op-ed published in the January 8, 2014, issue of the Jerusalem Post, Tapoohi wrote: “Every day, Israel Bonds emphasizes the message that Israel’s economy is dynamic, full of innovative spirit and groundbreaking entrepreneurship. It is a message that has resonated with Israel Bonds clients from across the spectrum who invest in Israel bonds to become stakeholders in one of the world’s most resilient economies."

Prior to 2012, Tapoohi's first full year with Israel Bonds, annual U.S. sales had remained in the $600 million range for several years. In his first year, sales topped $800 million, followed by three consecutive years (2013-2015) of domestic sales exceeding $1 billion.

He prioritized the organization's digital presence, particularly its e-commerce site, which, since its launch in fall 2011, has resulted in over $125 million in sales to date, encompassing more than 50,000 bondholders.

Together with the utilization of new technologies, Tapoohi ensured that the Bonds organization maintained personal contact with all clients via a national call center that proactively interacts with hundreds of clients each week, as well as through digital communication. He has also focused on enhanced levels of customer service.

Tapoohi also emphasized the need to attract a new generation to Israel Bonds, stating this was "a foremost priority" for the organization.

Additionally, he launched an initiative to counter anti-Israel activism on campus. Entitled "The Alternative BDS - Bonds Donated to Schools," it encouraged the donation of Israeli bonds to universities to counter the Boycott, Divestment and Sanctions (BDS) movement.

== Personal life ==
Tapoohi is married to Regina (formerly Lossak), who was a senior attorney at Israel's Justice Ministry working the field of trans-border criminal law. In September 2013, she was named senior delegate to the UN on behalf of the International Association of Jewish Lawyers and Jurists, and she continues to serve in that capacity on a volunteer basis. She was elected to the association's board of governors in November 2014. They have three daughters and one son.
