= Israel Bonds =

U.S. underwriter of Israeli-issued debt securities

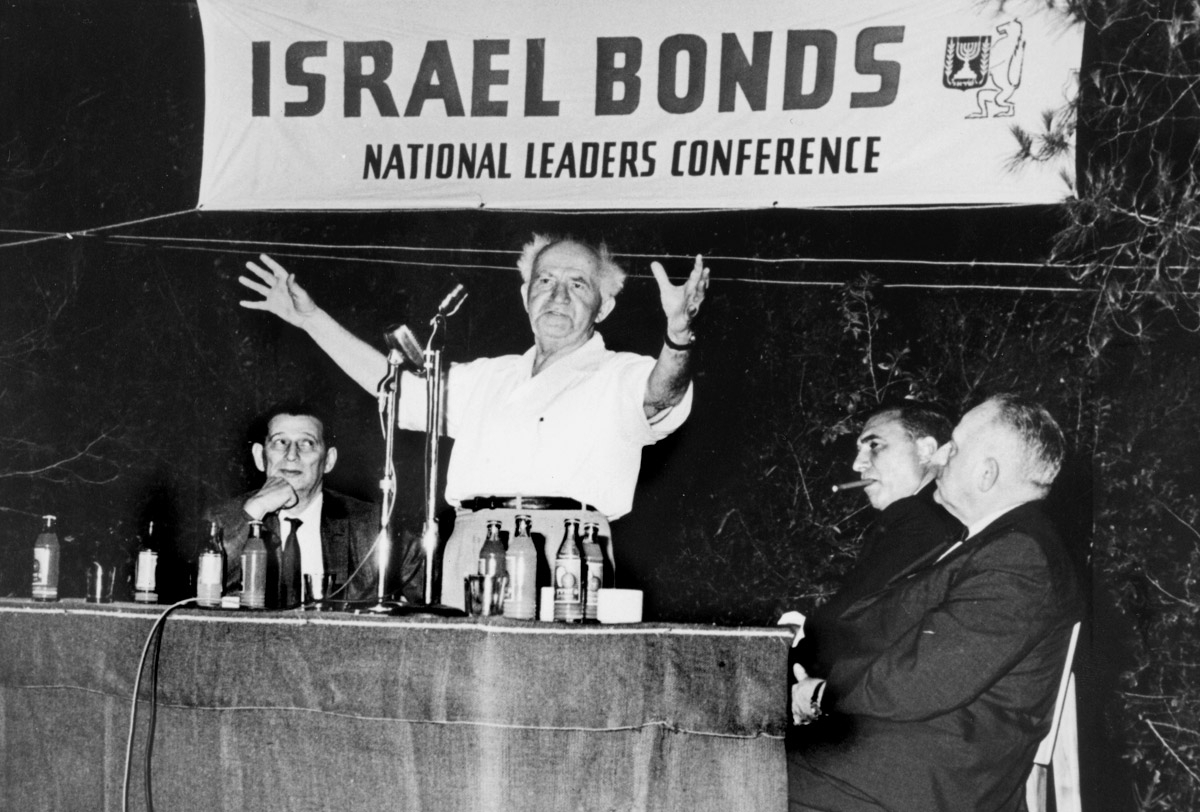
Prime Minister David Ben-Gurion welcomes an Israel Bonds delegation to Jerusalem.

Israel Bonds, the commonly known name of Development Corporation for Israel (DCI), is the U.S. underwriter of debt securities issued by the State of Israel. DCI is headquartered in New York City and is a broker-dealer and member of the Financial Industry Regulatory Authority (FINRA). Dan Naveh is president and CEO.

Bonds are sold in Canada through Canada-Israel Securities, Ltd.; in Europe through Development Company for Israel GmbH; and in the United Kingdom through Development Company for Israel, Ltd. Sales have increased steadily since the initial Independence Issue was offered in 1951, with total worldwide sales exceeding $54 billion.

At first, investors in Israel bonds were largely members of the American Jewish community looking to support the fledgling state's economy. However, throughout subsequent years, private and institutional investors alike viewed Israel bonds as meaningful investments. Over 90 U.S. state and municipal pension and treasury funds have invested more than $3 billion in Israel bonds to date. Other investors in Israel bonds include corporations, insurance companies, associations, unions, banks, financial institutions, universities, foundations, non-profits and synagogues. Israel uses proceeds from the sale of the bonds for general purposes of the state.

== Origins ==
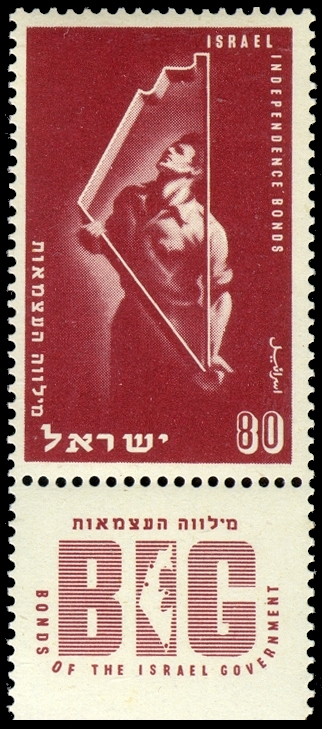
Stamp from 1951

The idea to float bonds issued by Israel's government was conceived by Israel's first prime minister, David Ben-Gurion, in the aftermath of the 1948 Palestine war, when the nation was critically short of economic resources.

Ben-Gurion turned to Diaspora Jewry, with the goal of obtaining millions of dollars in funding by engaging them as active partners in building the new Jewish state. In September 1950, he convened a meeting of American Jewish leaders at Jerusalem's King David Hotel, where Ben-Gurion shared his vision for a bond issue, which the delegates supported. The Knesset voted to launch Israel's first bond issue in February 1951. In May, the prime minister traveled to New York City to help launch the inaugural Independence Issue at a Madison Square Garden ceremony, raising $35 million. Expectations for first-year sales were $25 million. Instead, final results for 1951 more than doubled projections, exceeding $52 million.

== History ==
By 1957, "bond sales alone amount(ed) to an astonishing 35% of Israel's special development budget", with Foreign Minister Golda Meir emphatically stating, "the central role in building our economic strength has been played by Israel bonds."

Over subsequent decades sales continued to increase, particularly in times of crisis. During 1967's Six-Day War, sales exceeded $250 million, and in 1973, the year of the Yom Kippur War, sales exceeded $500 million. In 1991, the year of the Gulf War and Iraqi missile strikes on Israel, sales exceeded $1 billion. In 2020, in response to the COVID-19 pandemic, Israel Bonds approached the Finance Ministry to increase its goal for the year. The Finance Ministry approved the initiative, and the year concluded with record U.S. sales exceeding $1.5 billion. In the first four weeks of the Gaza war, several U.S. states invested $300 million; by November 11, 2023, a record-breaking $1 billion had been purchased by investors large and small.

Israel Bonds became an issue in Pennsylvania's 2024 treasurer race between Republican Stacy Garrity and Democrat Erin McClelland. In October 2023, Garrity's office purchased $20 million in Israel Bonds, bringing Pennsylvania's investment in Israel Bonds to a total of $56 million. Erin McClelland, Garrity's opponent in the November general election, said that she did not believe that the state should invest in foreign bonds, particularly when it meant taking sides in an overseas conflict.

On May 23, 2024, a national campaign was launched in the US to divest from Israel bonds.

In July 2024, the International Consortium of Investigative Journalists (ICIJ) reported that in addition to customers from the Jewish diaspora, Israel Bonds was seeking investments from banks, other institutional investors, and U.S. states and municipalities. After the October 7 attacks, anti-Zionist activists, including members of Jewish Voice for Peace, began to target the bonds in demands that corporations and institutions divest from financial instruments that support the government of Israel. Illinois treasurer Michael Frerichs said "We have been purchasing these Israel bonds for over 20 years. We get a good return, and so we were open to more purchases. But after the Hamas attack on Israel, we figure that they would be issuing more bonds. And we also wanted to show our support for an ally at a time of a terrorist invasion."

Total worldwide sales of the bonds that were first issued in 1951 had exceeded $54 billion by 2025.

On 1 September 2025, the Central Bank of Ireland (CBI), which had been responsible for regulating Israel Bonds within the European Union (EU) since the departure of the United Kingdom in 2020, announced it would no longer issue the bonds' prospectus, transferring regulatory responsibility to fellow EU member Luxembourg. Luxembourg's Commission de Surveillance du Secteur Financier (CSSF) approved the new prospectus the same day.

In November 2025, Michigan's chief investment officer chose not to reinvest $10 million in Israel bonds when they matured. In North Carolina, the $6.7 million in Israel bonds the state pension had held in June 2025 were gone from the portfolio by November.

On 1 September 2026, the CSSF stopped issuing the prospectus, potentially making sales of the bonds within the EU on or after that date illegal if no other EU member immediately volunteered to regulate them. While CSSF leadership said they stopped issuing the prospectus because the regulatory authority transferred by the CBI could not exceed one year, the European Securities and Markets Authority disputed that reasoning, saying that transfers generally could span multiple years.

In October 2026, Mark Levine, the New York City Comptroller, announced that the city's pension would not invest in Israel Bonds.

== Presidents of the Bonds ==
- Michael Arnon: 1974 to 1979 - The first Israeli in the role
- ?–1979: Yitzhak Rager
- 1979–1985: Yehuda Halevi
- 1989–1994: Meir Rosen
- 1994–1997: Nathan Sharoni
- 1997–2002: Gideon Pat
- 2002–2011: Yehoshua Matza
- 2011–2016: Israel Tapoohi
- 2016–2021: Israel Maimon
- 2021–Present: Dan Naveh
