= Celia Stopnicka Heller =

American sociologist (1922–2011)

Celia Stopnicka Heller (20 November 1922 – 15 April 2011) was a Poland-born American sociologist.

After graduating from Brooklyn College, in 1950, Heller entered a graduate program in sociology at Columbia University, earning a Master's in 1952, and a Ph.D. in 1962. Subsequently, she taught at Hunter College, beginning as an assistant professor, in 1964. She became a full professor there in 1972, and retired with emeritus status in 1984. During her career at Hunter College, she also taught at the Graduate Center, CUNY. From 1970 to 1971 she was a visiting professor at Tel Aviv University and Bar Ilan University.

Her first book was Mexican American Youth: Forgotten Youth at the Crossroads (Random House, 1966). This was researched while she was at UCLA and represents the first of three phases of her writing.

The second phase of Heller's writing is represented by Structured social inequality: a reader in comparative social stratification (Macmillan, 1968), which a collection of articles, some of which she wrote.

Her last phase of writing includes On the Edge of Destruction: Jews in Poland Between the Two World Wars (Columbia University Press 1977). The book is dedicated to her grandfather, the Rabbi Shaul ben Yitzhak Yosef ha-Kohen Rosenman. It won a National Jewish Book Award in the Jewish History category.

She served as president of the Association for the Social Scientific Study of Jewry 1977–1979.

According to the late Irving Piliavin, Professor and director emeritus at the University of Wisconsin School of Social Welfare, as Celia Stopnicka Rosenthal did, she wrote a mimeographed manuscript, Toward the Conceptualization of 'Needs', about which there is no further information.

She published twice in the American Journal of Sociology and once in the British Journal of Sociology.
