= Sylvia Barack Fishman =

American feminist sociologist and author

Sylvia Barack Fishman (born December 28, 1942) is an American feminist sociologist and author. She is an Emerita Professor of Contemporary Jewish Life at Brandeis University and is presently co-director of the Hadassah-Brandeis Institute and a board member of the Jewish Orthodox Feminist Alliance. She writes about Jewish life in America.

== Books ==
- The Way into the Varieties of Jewishness (Jewish Lights, 2008)
- Double or Nothing?" Jewish Families and Mixed Marriage (Brandeis, 2004)
- Jewish Life and American Culture (SUNY Press, 2000)
- A Breath of Life: Feminism in the American Jewish Community (Brandeis Series in American Jewish History, Culture, and Life, 1995)
- Relatively speaking: Constructing identity in Jewish and mixed married families (David W. Belin lecture in American Jewish affairs, 2002)

== Awards and honors ==
- Marshall Sklare Award of the Association for the Social Scientific Study of Jewry, 2014 (2014)
- Vice President Association for the Social Scientific Study of Jewry (2008 - 2011)
- Marver and Sheva Bernstein Faculty Fellowship (1995 - 1996)
- National Jewish Book Award Honor Book, contemporary Jewish life category (A Breath of Life: Feminism in the American Jewish Community) (1994)
- Samuel Belkin Award for Distinguished Professional Achievement, Yeshiva University (1991)
- Danforth Graduate Fellowship for Women (1974 - 1978)
