= Michael Strassfeld =

American rabbi

Michael Strassfeld is an American rabbi. From 2001-2015, Strassfeld was rabbi of the Society for the Advancement of Judaism, a Manhattan synagogue. From 1982-2001, he was the rabbi of Manhattan’s Congregation Ansche Chesed.

== Biography ==
Michael Strassfeld is a graduate of the Maimonides School. He started college at Yeshiva University, but transferred to Brandeis University and graduated in 1971. He holds an M.A. from Brandeis in Near Eastern and Judaic Studies, and completed his doctoral coursework in Jewish History at Brandeis but did not submit a thesis. He was ordained by the Reconstructionist Rabbinical College in 1991.

Strassfeld first received wide public attention as one of the authors of The Jewish Catalog. He was a leader of the Chavurah movement and was the founding chairperson of the National Havurah Committee from 1979 to 1982.

The original version of Passover Haggadah: The Feast of Freedom was edited by Strassfeld. After publishing it for members of the Rabbinical Assembly in their rabbinical journal, Rachel Anne Rabinowicz came on board next as editor of the project. She brought the work to its final form.

Strassfeld is married to Rabbi Joy Levitt and he is father to sons Max, Noam, and Benjamin and stepdaughters Sara and Ruthie Friedlander, as well as being grandfather to Micah Strassfeld.

== Publications ==
- The First Jewish Catalog. A Do-It-Yourself Kit. Compiled and edited by Richard Siegel, Michael Strassfeld, and Sharon Strassfeld (1973).
- The Second Jewish Catalog. Comp. and ed. by Michael Strassfeld and Sharon Strassfeld (1976).
- The Third Jewish Catalog. Compiled and ed. by Sharon Strassfeld and Michael Strassfeld (1980).
- Shabbat Haggadah for Celebration and Study (1980).
- The Jewish holidays: a guide and commentary. With Arnold M. Eisen and Betsy Platkin Teutsch (Illustrations) (1985).
- A Night of Questions, a Passover Haggadah ed. with Rabbi Joy Levitt (2000).
- A Book of Life: Embracing Judaism as a Spiritual Practice, Schocken Books (2002).
- Judaism Disrupted: A Spiritual Manifesto for the 21st Century, Ben Yehuda Press (2023)
