= CubaOne Foundation =

Nonprofit organization

- Type: Non-Profit
- Founded: 2016
- Founders: Daniel Jimenez, Giancarlo Sopo, Cherie Cancio, Andrew Jimenez
- Headquarters: Miami, FL
- Services: Sponsors free trips to Cuba for young Cuban Americans

CubaOne Foundation, also known as CubaOne, is a Miami-based not-for-profit organization that sponsors free 7-day trips to Cuba for young Cuban Americans ages 22–35.

It was founded by Daniel Jimenez, Giancarlo Sopo, Cherie Cancio, and Andrew Jimenez.

== History ==
CubaOne Foundation was launched in 2016. It is modeled loosely after Birthright Israel, the Jewish organization that offers young Jews free trips to Israel. The organization was founded by four Cuban Americans from Florida: Daniel Jimenez, Giancarlo Sopo, Cherie Cancio, and Andrew Jimenez.

== Eligibility ==
Eligible applicants must be 22-35 year-old Cuban Americans.

== Funding ==
CubaOne Foundation is funded by its founders.

== Reception ==
Since its launch, CubaOne Foundation has received mainly favorable press coverage. It was called "a groundbreaking organization" by Vivala and "a wonderful initiative" by NBC Miami. An opinion editorial in The New York Times said that the program is an idea that Cuban American politicians "should ponder."
