= Merle Feld =

American poet (born 1947)

- Born: October 18, 1947 (age 78); Brooklyn, New York City, U.S.
- Education: Brooklyn College
- Occupations: Writer; poet; educator; activist
- Spouse: Edward Feld
- Writing career
- Period: 1980s–present
- Genres: memoir, poetry, plays
- Notable works: A Spiritual Life, The Gates Are Closing, "We All Stood Together"
- Website: www.merlefeld.com

Merle Feld (born October 18, 1947) is an American educator, activist, author, playwright, and poet.

== Biography ==
Merle Feld was born on October 18, 1947, in Brooklyn. In 1968, she graduated from Brooklyn College and moved to Boston, where she became involved with the newly founded Havurat Shalom, the community "often considered a flagship of the havurah movement." She began writing her first play, The Opening, in 1981, and in 1983 began work on her second, The Gates Are Closing. This play is often read in synagogues in preparation for the High Holidays. In 1984, she joined B'not Esh, a Jewish feminist community, and early on, during one of their annual retreats, shared her first poems.

In 1989, she went to Israel for a sabbatical, where she facilitated an all-female Israeli-Palestinian dialogue group on the West Bank, and demonstrated with Women in Black. This part of her life was the basis of her third play, Across the Jordan, which was included as part of the first anthology of female Jewish playwrights, Making a Scene (Syracuse University Press, 1997).

In 2000, she was named a "Woman Who Dared" by the Jewish Women's Archive for her peace activism.

In 2005, she became the founding director of the Albin Rabbinic Writing Institute, mentoring rabbinical students and recently ordained rabbis across the denominations.

She is married to Rabbi Edward Feld, and the two have a daughter, Lisa, and a son, Uri.

=== Writing ===
In 1999, she published a memoir, A Spiritual Life: A Jewish Feminist Journey, through SUNY Press, which has been translated into Russian and published in the former Soviet Union. A revised edition was published in 2007 as A Spiritual Life: Exploring the Heart and the Jewish Tradition.

In 2010, she published the poetry collection Finding Words. In 2023, she published Longing: Poems of a Life with CCAR Press.

Feld's poem "Let my people go that we may serve You" was commissioned by the Women's Rabbinic Network in honor of Sally Priesand.
