= Edward Feld =

Edward Feld (born 1943) is a Conservative rabbi and author. He was the senior editor of the Rabbinical Assembly's Maḥzor Lev Shalem (2010), which was the first Conservative Jewish liturgical publication to include passages aimed at the needs of LGBTQ Jews. Feld currently serves as the senior editor of the Rabbinical Assembly's Shabbat and festivals prayer book Siddur Lev Shalem (2016), a follow-up to the machzor preceding it that is similarly dotted with commentaries and contemporary alternative textual options.

Feld's other works include The Spirit of Jewish Renewal: Finding Faith After the Holocaust (Jewish Lights Publishing: 2003), Joy, Despair, and Hope: Reading Psalms (Cascade Books: 2013), and many articles, including "Towards an Aggadic Judaism" (Conservative Judaism Journal: 29, 3; 1975).

Feld is married to educator, activist, playwright, poet, and author Merle Feld, and the two have a daughter, Lisa, and a son, Uri.
