= Jewish identity =

Perceiving oneself as a Jew

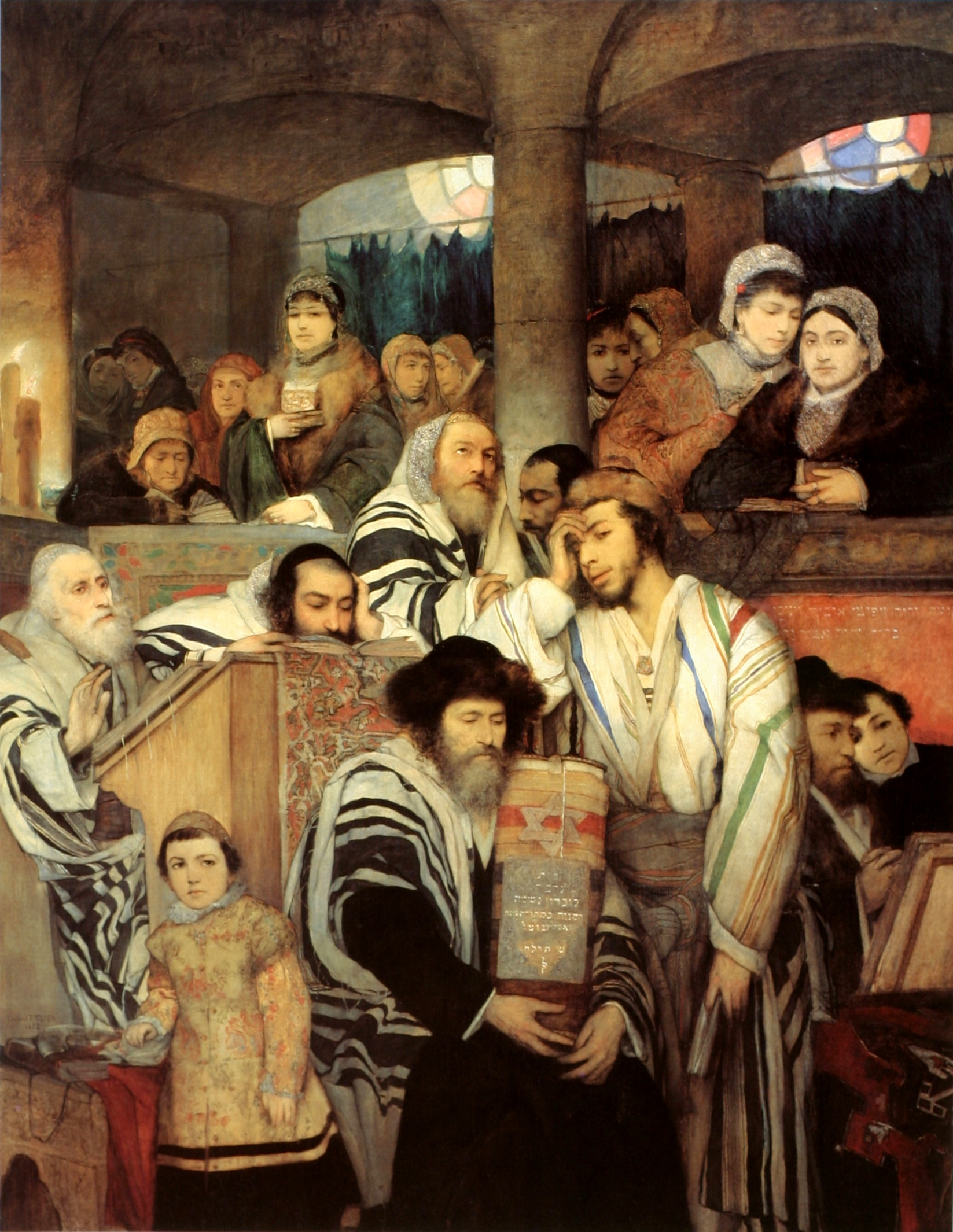
Ashkenazi Jews praying in the synagogue on Yom Kippur, showing traditional Jewish clothing and practice, including tallit, the Torah, and head coverings. (1878 painting by Maurice Gottlieb)

Jewish identity is the objective or subjective sense of perceiving oneself as a Jew and as relating to being Jewish. It encompasses elements of nationality, ethnicity, religion, and culture. Broadly defined, Jewish identity does not rely on whether one is recognized as Jewish by others or by external religious, legal, or sociological standards. Jewish identity does not imply religiosity or Jewish orthodoxy. Accordingly, Jewish identity can be ethnic or cultural in nature. Jewish identity can involve ties to the Jewish community.

Conservative and Orthodox Judaism base Jewishness on matrilineal descent. According to Jewish law (halakha), all those born of a Jewish mother are considered Jewish, regardless of personal beliefs or level of observance of Jewish law. Progressive Judaism and Haymanot Judaism in general base Jewishness on having at least one Jewish parent, while Karaite Judaism bases Jewishness only on paternal lineage. While these differences between the major Jewish streams are a source of the disagreement and debate about who is a Jew, all interpretations of Rabbinic Judaism agree that a valid Jewish identity may also be achieved via conversion.

Jews who are atheists or Jews who follow other religions may have a Jewish identity. While the absolute majority of people with this identity are of Jewish ethnicity, people of a mixed Jewish and non-Jewish background or gentiles of Jewish ancestry may still have a sense of Jewish self-identity.

== Components ==
Jewish identity can be described as consisting of three interconnected parts:

1. Jewish peoplehood, an ethnic identity composed of several subdivisions that evolved in the Diaspora.
2. Jewish religion, observance of spiritual and ritual tenets of Judaism.
3. Jewish culture, celebration of traditions, secular and religious alike.

== History ==
=== Iron Age Judah ===
Anthony D. Smith, an historical sociologist considered one of the founders of the interdisciplinary field of nationalism studies, and the principal theorist of the ethnosymbolist approach to nationalism, describes the kingdom of Judah of the late 8th and 7th centuries BCE as a "named and self-defined human community" bound by shared ancestry myths, historical memory, and a literary culture. He argues that the reforms of Hezekiah and Josiah, along with prophetic calls for religious purification, encouraged among the elites a Judahite ethnic consciousness tied to the ideal of a divine Covenant. He notes, however, that given the persistence of idol worship in the countryside, this consciousness was probably limited to Jerusalem and its vicinity. Smith concurs with sociologist Steven Grosby's description of late-7th-century Judah as a "nationality," though he states his own preference is to call it a "nation", one that was nevertheless "quickly wiped out."

Alongside ancient Egypt, Smith regards Judah as one of only two societies in the ancient Near East where the necessary combination of political structure and unifying religious ideology was sufficiently developed to approximate a nation; he contrasts this with Assyria and Persia, where he argues that imperial rulers tolerated or failed to unite subject peoples around a shared cult, and with ancient Greece, where the primary loyalty to the individual polis and the absence of a single overarching political framework prevented a comparable Hellenic nation from forming.

=== Second Temple period ===
In classical antiquity, Jewish identity was ethnic and based on birth. Ancient sources consistently portray it as a matter of descent and belonging to the ethnic group, with religious practices regarded as integral to their ethnic character and recognized as such by outsiders. Contemporary Greek, Roman, and Jewish sources consistently referred to the Jews as an ethnos, one among the many ethne inhabiting the Greco-Roman world. Van Maaren utilizes the six attributes that co-ethnics share, as identified by Hutchinson and Smith, to show why ancient Jews may be considered an ethnic group in modern terminology. Those include:

1. A common proper name that identifies and conveys the "essence" of its community. In antiquity, three proper names were used to refer to the Jewish ethnos, namely: "Hebrew", "Israel", and "Jews".
2. A myth of common ancestry. In the Jewish case, of descent from eponymous ancestor Jacob/Israel; additionally, the putative descent from Abraham was used to expand definitions of Jewishness by the Hasmoneans and contested by others.
3. Shared memories of the past, including historical events and heroes. Jewish sacred books' accounts of historical events serve as a basic collection of those. Stories and figures narrated in the Hebrew Bible and other writings were further ingrained in the collective Jewish identity by the community reading of these books in synagogues. That includes figures such as the Patriarchs, Moses and David, and events including the Exodus, the covenant at Mount Sinai, the heyday of the united monarchy, the Babylonian captivity, the Antiochene persecutions, and the Maccabean revolt.
4. One or more aspects of common culture, which are not necessitated to be specified, but typically include religion, language, and customs. There were significant overlaps between the religion, languages, customs, and other cultural aspects shared by ancient Jews; moreover, religion cannot be separated from other cultural aspects, especially in ancient times. The worship of the God of Israel, the work of the cult at Jerusalem and other cultic sites, and the following of particular Jewish customs (dietary laws, Sabbath observance, etc.) were major aspects of Jewishness at the period. Despite the fact that not all Jews spoke the same language, because many of the sacred writings were written in Hebrew, it also served as a symbol for Jews who did not speak the language.
5. A connection to a homeland, which need not be physically occupied by the ethnic group in order for it to have symbolic attachment to the place of origin, as is the case for diaspora populations. In the Jewish case, this is the Land of Israel, or Judaea/Palaestina. For both the local Jews and those residing abroad, the land held symbolic value. It endures, despite the Land's borders frequently shifting and occasionally disappearing throughout time.
6. A sense of solidarity among at least some sections of the ethnic population. The strength of this sentiment varies. Josephus reports that when the First Jewish-Roman War broke out, the Jews of Scythopolis joined the city in defending it from Jewish rebels, possibly indicating they had a weaker sense of solidarity for the Jewish ethnos. However, they were later betrayed and killed by their fellow townsmen, a situation Josephus appears to present as a lesson against trusting non-Jews over Jews during times of conflict.

Anthony D. Smith wrote that the Jews of the late Second Temple period provide "a closer approximation to the ideal type of the nation [...] than perhaps anywhere else in the ancient world." He adds that this observation "must make us wary of pronouncing too readily against the possibility of the nation, and even a form of religious nationalism, before the onset of modernity." Smith argues that, even under foreign rule, in the post-exilic period the Jews of Jerusalem built an "autonomous ethnoreligious community" centered on the Temple, harking back to the Mosaic Covenant. He identifies the Maccabean Revolt of 167 BCE as a turning point at which this consciousness found renewed political expression, with leaders such as Simon combining military leadership with the religious office of high priest, legitimized through "ratification of the assembled people." In the following century, Smith points to a renewed emphasis on the extent of the Land of Israel, an "efflorescence of Temple culture" alongside the growing role of synagogues, and wider observance of the Torah. He contends that Roman occupation reinforced these processes, with the Pharisees and the Zealot movement giving voice to "heightened national sentiment" among large numbers of the Jewish population. Smith concludes that this "self-renewing religion", carried forward in later Judaism, Christianity and Islam, "was to exert so powerful an influence on the later development of nations". In another text he argued that while the Jews have been a "nation" since as early as the seventh century BCE, "nationalism" per his definition did not emerge until the Roman period, with the Zealots and during the Bar Kokhba Revolt, whose "religio-political" uprisings aimed to "restore the Hasmonean national state." He distinguishes these from the earlier resistance under Hezekiah and Josiah, which he classifies as "ethnic resistance movements" rather than nationalism proper, since only the Zealots and Bar Kokhba rebels sought to restore "national autonomy, unity and identity" through an independent Jewish state.

Historian David Goodblatt writes that there is a "distinct possibility of finding premodern groups that meet the criteria for a nation (not just for ethnicity), with the Jews providing perhaps the clearest example". Agreeing with Smith, Goodblatt proposes dropping the qualifier "religious" in the definition of Jewish nationalism by Smith, noting that according to Smith himself, a religious component in national memories and culture is common even in the modern era. This view is echoed by political scientist Tom Garvin, who writes that "something strangely like modern nationalism is documented for many peoples in medieval times and in classical times as well," citing the ancient Jews as one of several "obvious examples", alongside the classical Greeks, the Gauls and the British Celts.

Adrian Hastings argued that Jews are the "true proto-nation", that through the model of ancient Israel found in the Hebrew Bible, provided the world with the original concept of nationhood which later influenced Christian nations. However, following Jerusalem's destruction in the first century CE, Jews ceased to be a political entity and did not resemble a traditional nation-state for almost two millennia. Despite this, they maintained their national identity through collective memory, religion and sacred texts, even without land or political power, and remained a nation rather than just an ethnic group, eventually leading to the rise of Zionism and the establishment of Israel.

The writings of Philo, a Jewish philosopher from Alexandria who flourished in the first half of the first century CE, reflect on Jewish identity in the diaspora during the late Second Temple period. At the time Philo lived, Jews had been present in the Diaspora, particularly in Alexandria, for a very long time. Because his fellow nationals had lived there for many generations, Philo appears to have regarded Alexandria as his city. To explain the status of the Jews in terms Greek readers would understand, Philo depicted them as immigrants who established "colonies" (Greek: apoikiai), with Jerusalem serving as their "mother-city" (metropolis). According to Kasher, Alexandria could only be regarded as a homeland in a political sense because it was the site of a Jewish "colony," structured as a distinct ethnic union with a recognized political and legal status (politeuma), with Jerusalem being the colony's mother-city.

=== Late antiquity ===
Jewish identity underwent a significant shift in the centuries that followed the destruction of the Temple in 70 CE. The initial conception of the Jews as an ethnos, albeit one with a distinctive religious culture, gradually shifted to that of a religious community that also identified as a nation.

In the aftermath of the First Jewish–Roman War, the Fiscus Judaicus was imposed on all Jews in the Roman Empire, replacing the annual half-shekel tribute that Jews paid to the Temple in Jerusalem. It appears that the Romans chose to use Jewish religious behavior rather than Jewish ancestry to determine tax liability, and this Roman interference in Jewish tax-collection may have prompted this transformation in Jewish identity. The process was accelerated by the Christianization of the Roman Empire. In Christian theology, ethnic identity held little significance, and Jews were primarily valued for their religious heritage, seen as foundational to the development of the new covenant. This ideological framework further influenced perceptions of Jewish identity, emphasizing religious rather than ethnic or national aspects.

The Jews never lost their standing as a recognized people following the First Jewish Revolt, despite Theodor Mommsen's once-influential suggestion to the contrary. Greek and Latin authors writing in the late first and second centuries CE continued to describe Jews as a gens or ethnos without hesitation: Tacitus applies gens to Jews repeatedly in his Histories, while Suetonius, Arrian, and Appian all reach for the equivalent term people. Origen, the Christian theologian writing in the first half of the third century, when describing the Jewish patriarchate, treats the Jews as an ethnos. The terms natio and ethnos were flexible during this period, applied to both peoples and provincial populations, with cultural and social markers more decisive in such definitions than real or imagined common descent. Within this structure, the Jews formed a exception, since their collective identity rested not on language (with four different languages commonly used by Jews by this period) but on religion and kinship, with the latter discarded by Christianity to ease its spread among the Gentiles.

=== Modernity ===
According to Anthony Smith, modern Zionism built on a national foundation that already existed rather than originating it. He points to the national sentiments present in ancient Judea and centuries of medieval Jewish thought about the Land of Israel as evidence that neither Zionism nor Moses Hess deserve credit for sustaining a "vivid sense of Jewish nationhood among so many Jews before and into modern times."

== A cultural/ancestral concept ==
Jewish identity can be cultural, religious, or through ancestry. There are religious, cultural, and ancestral components to Jewish identity due to its fundamental non-proselytizing nature, as opposed to Christian or Muslim identity which are both "universal" religions in that they ascribe to the notion that their faith is meant to be spread throughout all of humanity, regardless of nationality. However, Jewish identity is firmly intertwined with Jewish ancestry dating back to the historical Kingdom of Israel, which was largely depopulated by the Roman Empire c. first century CE, leading to what is known as today as the Jewish Diaspora.

== In contemporary sociology ==
Jewish identity began to gain the attention of Jewish sociologists in the United States with the publication of Marshall Sklare's "Lakeville studies". Among other topics explored in the studies was Sklare's notion of a "good Jew". The "good Jew" was essentially an idealized form of Jewish identity as expressed by the Lakeville respondents. Today, sociological measurements of Jewish identity have become the concern of the Jewish Federations who have sponsored numerous community studies across the U.S.; policy decisions (in areas such as funding, programming, etc.) have been shaped in part due to studies on Jewish identity.

== Antisemitism and Jewish identity ==
According to social-psychologist Simon Herman, antisemitism contributes to the formation of Jewish identity. This view is echoed by religious leaders such as Rabbi Jonathan Sacks who writes that modern Jewish communities and the modern Jewish identity are deeply influenced by antisemitism.

Right-wing antisemitism, for example, is typically a branch of white supremacy: it traditionally conceives of Jews as a distinct race with intrinsic, undesirable qualities that must be exterminated from the population. Left-wing antisemitism, by contrast, frequently views Jews as members of the white race, an idea that is a precursor to the criticism of Zionism as a racist ideology, as well as the exclusion of Jews from goals of intersectionality.

== See also ==
- Basic Laws of Israel
- Cultural diversity
- Cultural identity
- Ethnic identity development
- Ethnogenesis
- Group identity
- Halakha
- Identity (social science)
- Identity formation
- Identity politics
- Jewish assimilation
- Jewish adjacent
- Jewish atheism
- Jewish diaspora
- Jewish peoplehood
- Jewish population
- Law of Return
- Matrilineality
- National identity
- On Venus, Have We Got a Rabbi!
- Passing (racial identity)
- Politics of Israel
- Secular Jewish culture
- Self-concept
- Social identity
- Who is a Jew?
- Gerim
