= Chavurah =

Autonomous Jewish group

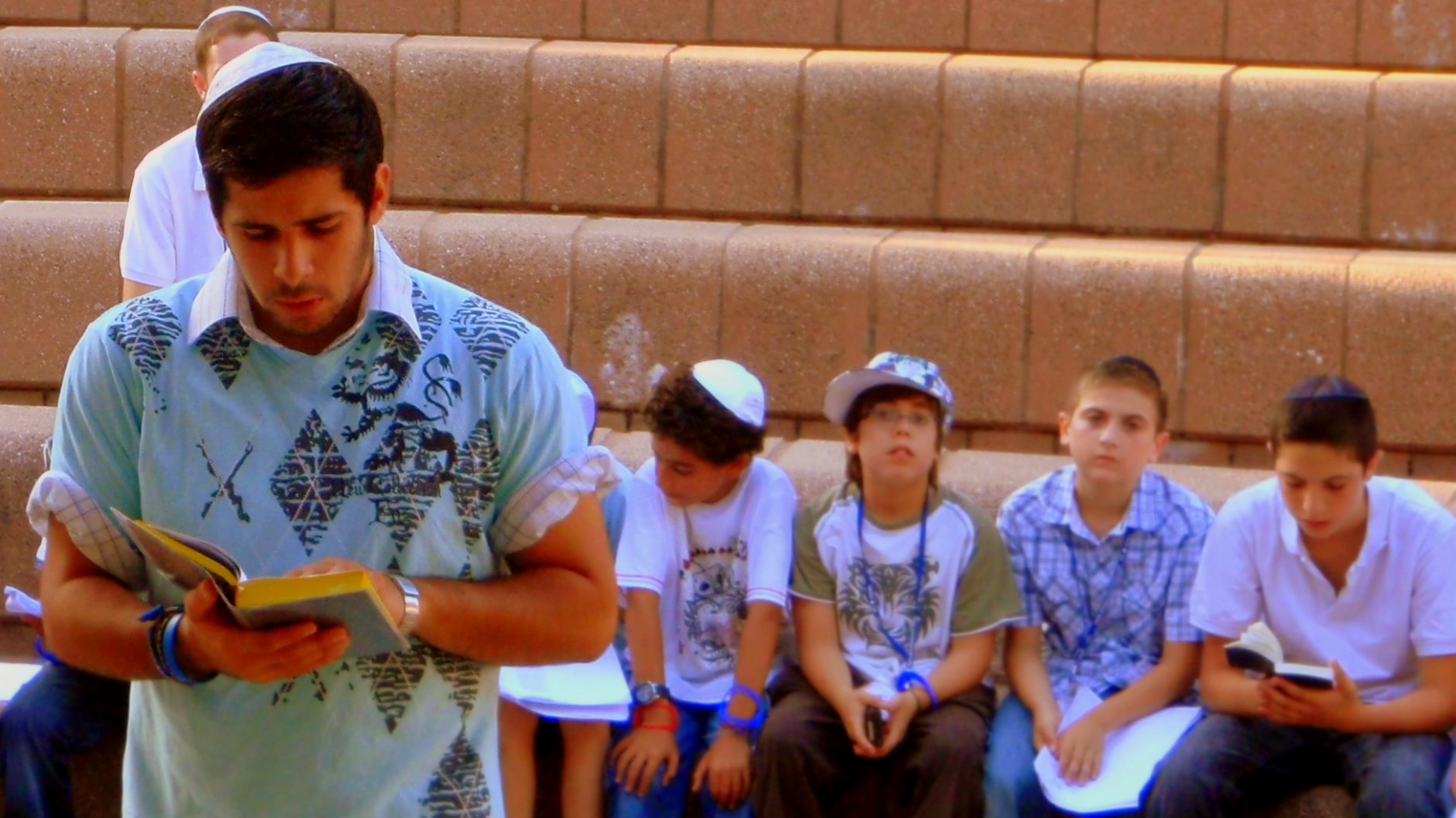
Members of Israeli summer youth programs eCamp celebrating Shabbat.

A chavurah or havurah (Hebrew: חֲבוּרָה, romanized: ḥəḇurā, lit. 'fellowship' pl.: (c)havurahs or (c)havurot or (c)havuroth), is a small group of like-minded Jews who assemble to facilitate Shabbat and holiday prayer services and share communal experiences such as life-cycle events or learning.

Chavurot usually provide autonomous alternatives to established Jewish institutions and Jewish denominations. Many chavurot emphasize egalitarianism in the broad sense (of which gender egalitarianism is one piece), depending on participation by the entire community rather than top-down direction by clergy.

In Orthodox usage, the etymologically related chaburah refers to a Torah focused study group.

== History ==
The first chavurah in the United States was formed in September 1960 in Whittier, California. However, most chavurot in America had their origins in the North American Jewish counter-cultural trends of the late 1960s and early 1970s. During this period, groups of young rabbis, academics, and political activists founded experimental chavurot for prayer and study, in reaction to what they perceived as an over-institutionalized and unspiritual North American Jewish establishment. Initially the main inspiration was the pietistic fellowships of the Pharisees and other ancient Jewish sects.

As the Havurah movement expanded in the 1970s, these groups blended religious rituals with secular activities, meeting outside of traditional temple settings and without the formal guidance of rabbis. Denominational lines were often blurred and emphasis was on community and spirituality over formal synagogue elements. However, some of these groups were welcomed into synagogues with the blessing of the rabbi. Members were often young professionals and families with children.

Initially some of these groups, like the Boston-area Havurat Shalom, attempted to function as full-fledged rural communes after the model of their secular counterparts. Others formed as communities within the urban or suburban Jewish establishment. Although the leadership and ritual privileges were initially men-only, as in Orthodox Jewish practice, second-wave feminism soon led to the full integration of women in these communities. Most Havurah communities today are egalitarian.

Apart from some tentative articles in Response and other Jewish student magazines, the early chavurot attracted little attention in the wider North American Jewish community. Then, in 1973, Michael and Sharon Strassfeld released The Jewish Catalog: A Do-It-Yourself Kit. Patterned after the recently published counter-culture Whole Earth Catalog, the book served both as a basic reference on Judaism and American Jewish life, as well as a playful compendium of Jewish crafts, recipes, meditational practices, and political action ideas, all aimed at disaffected young Jewish adults. The Jewish Catalog became one of the best-selling books in American Jewish history to that date and spawned two sequels. A much more widespread chavurah movement soon emerged, including self-governing chavurot within Reform, Conservative and Reconstructionist synagogues. In 1989, Riv-Ellen Prell published Prayer & Community: The Havurah in American Judaism to unpack why otherwise fully secularized Jews in the 1970s while rejecting their parents' Judaism nonetheless sought a tradition-based prayer experience.

In 1980, a networking organization called The National Havurah Committee (NHC) was founded in North America, to facilitate and promote the activities of havurah communities. The NHC provides resources and support to havurah groups and also organizes a week-long learning and community event called Summer Institute.

== Orthodox Judaism ==
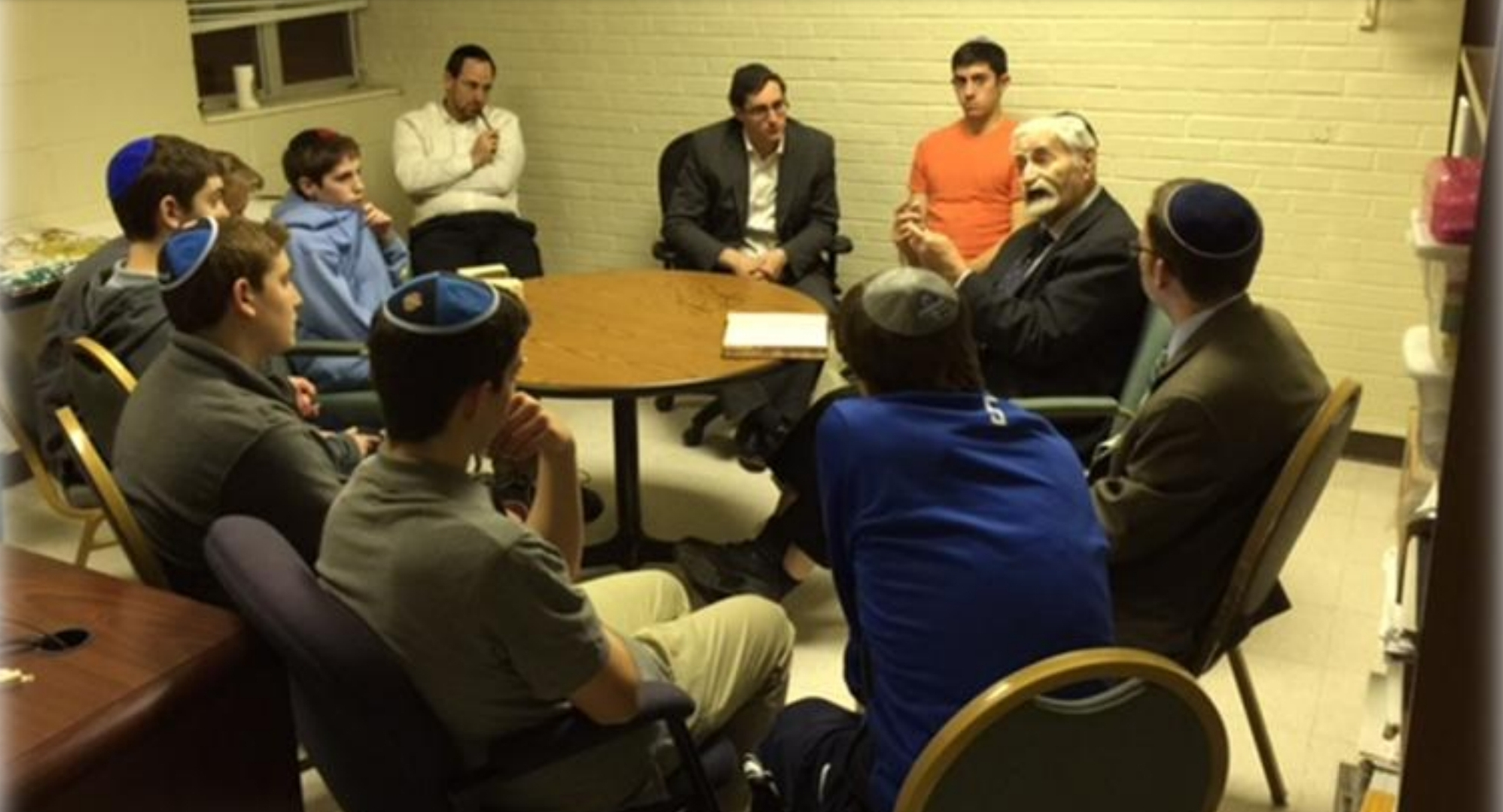
"Mishmar" Chaburah at a Torah High School in Memphis.

Some Orthodox yeshivot – such as Beth Medrash Govoha, Ner Yisroel and Kollel Etz Chaim – organize Torah study at senior levels along lines similar to the above. Here, the members of the "chaburah", as the word is pronounced among Ashkenazim, all focus on the same specific area of Torah study; usually proceeding together through a Talmudic tractate or order of Shulchan Aruch, and often a particular Mussar work, led by a senior member of the Kollel. This is in distinction to the usual shiur format, i.e. a lecture based discursive-review.
