= Egon Mayer (sociologist) =

Egon Mayer (December 23, 1944 – January 30, 2004) was a Swiss-born American sociologist and professor at Brooklyn College. He wrote a number of books on Jewish culture and history, including From Suburb to Shtetl (1979), The Court Jew: A Contribution to the History of Absolutism in Europe (1984), and Love and Tradition: Marriage Between Jews and Christians (1985).

Mayer was born in Caux, Switzerland to Eugen Mayer (born in 1914 in Komárno, Austria-Hungary; now Slovakia), and Hedvig "Hedy" Mayer (also known as Haedviga Mayerová, born in 1925 in Budapest, then Kingdom of Hungary). They held Czechoslovak citizenship at the time, as Komarno was split in 1920 by the Treaty of Trianon. His parents were Jews who were passengers on the Kastner train during the Holocaust. Mayer's mother was pregnant with him at the time. The train left Budapest in June 1944 after Rudolf Kastner, a Hungarian lawyer, negotiated with Adolf Eichmann to allow 1,684 Jews safe passage to Switzerland. The passengers arrived in Switzerland in two stages – one in August 1944, the second in December – the month in which Mayer was born – after a stop at the Bergen-Belsen concentration camp. Mayer created and maintained a website in Kastner's memory. Mayer's family returned to Budapest when the war ended, then immigrated to the United States in 1956. Mayer studied at Brooklyn College (City University of New York) and the New School for Social Research, obtaining his Ph.D. in sociology in 1975 from Rutgers University.

== Death ==
Mayer died on January 30, 2004, aged 59, from cancer of the gall bladder, in Laurel Hollow, New York. He was survived by his mother, his wife and their three daughters.
