= Marshall Sklare =

American sociologist (1921–1992)

- Born: October 21, 1921; Chicago, Illinois
- Died: March 1, 1992 (aged 70); Newton, Massachusetts
- Education: University of Chicago
- Scientific career
- Fields: Sociology
- Workplaces: Brandeis University

Marshall Sklare (1921–1992) was an American sociologist whose work focused on American Jews and the American Jewish Community. Sklare was the Klutznick Family Professor of Contemporary Jewish Studies and Sociology at Brandeis University. Because of his contributions to the social scientific study of Jewry, Sklare is known as the "father of American Jewish sociology".

== Biography ==
Sklare was born in Chicago on October 21, 1921, and died in Newton, Massachusetts, on March 1, 1992. Sklare was a third-generation Jewish American, the grandson of Meyer and Eva Lipman, immigrants from the area of Kovno in Lithuania.

== Academic career ==
Sklare earned his master's degree in Sociology from the University of Chicago and his Ph.D. in Sociology from Columbia University under the guidance of Seymour Martin Lipset.

Sklare joined the Brandeis University faculty as a professor of Jewish sociology in 1969, where as the Klutznick Family Professor of Contemporary Jewish Studies and Sociology he was the driving force behind the creation of the University's Cohen Center for Modern Jewish Studies, the first research center on Jewish life in America. He was Director of the Center from 1980 to 1986 - a period in which it became a focal point for new scholarship on the history and sociology of American Jews - and also chaired the University's Near Eastern and Judaic department in 1982 and 1983. Sklare retired from Brandeis in December 1990.

== Association for the Social Scientific Study ==
Sklare served as the second president for the Association for the Social Scientific Study of Jewry (ASSJ) following Dr. Mervin Verbit. Sklare was president of the ASSJ from 1973 to 1975. To date, twenty two scholars have received the Marshall Sklare Award.

=== The Marshall Sklare Award ===
Starting in 1992, the ASSJ began the Marshall Sklare Award, an annual honor named in Sklare's memory recognizing "a senior scholar who has made a significant scholarly contribution to the social scientific study of Jewry".

== Studies in Jewish identity ==
Sklare caught the attention of the American Jewish community with his studies on Jewish identity. Sklare's "Lakeville studies" was one of the first of its kind exploring the Jewish identities of American Jews in suburbia.

=== The Lakeville studies ===
Among other topics explored in Sklare's "Lakeville studies" was Sklare's notion of a "good Jew". The "good Jew" was essentially an idealized form of Jewish identity as expressed by the Lakeville respondents.

== Works ==
=== Books ===
- Sklare, M. (Ed.). (1983). American Jews, a reader. Behrman House.
- Sklare, M. (1983). Conservative Judaism: An American Religious Movement. Irvington Publishers.
- Sklare, M., & Greenblum, J. (1979). Jewish identity on the suburban frontier: A study of group survival in the open society. Chicago: University of Chicago Press.
- Sklare, M. (1982). Understanding American Jewry. Transaction Publishers.
- Sklare, M. (Ed.). (1974). The Jewish Community in America. Behrman House.
- Sklare, M. (1971). America's Jews. New York: Random House.
- Sklare, M., & Greenblum, J. (1967). Jewish Industry on the Suburban Frontier: A Study of Group Survival in the Open Society. New York: Basic Books
- Sklare, M., Greenblum, J., & Ringer, B. B. (1967). The Lakeville Studies. Under the Dir. of Marshall Sklare. Basic books.
- Stember, C. H., & Sklare, M. (1966). Jews in the Mind of America. New York: Basic Books.
- Sklare, M. (Ed.). (1958). The Jews; social patterns of an American group. Glencoe, IL: Free Press.
- Sklare, M. (1955). Conservative Judaism. Glencoe, IL: Free Press.

=== Articles ===
- Sklare, M. (1993). The Conservative movement: Achievements and problems. The Jewish Community in America, 175–192.
- Sklare, M. (1990). Religion and ethnicity in the American Jewish community. Social foundations of Judaism, 135–145.
- Sklare, M. (1982). On the preparation of a sociology of American Jewry. Understanding American Jewry, edited by M. Sklare. New Brunswick, NJ: Transaction Books and Center for Modern Jewish Studies, Brandeis University, 261–71.
- Sklare, M. (1978). Jewish Acculturation and American Jewish Identity. Jewish Life in America: Historical Perspectives. New York: Institute of Human Relations Press of the American Jewish Committee, 167–187.
- Sklare, M. (1976). American Jewry—The Ever Dying People. Midstream, 22(6), 17–27.
- Sklare, M. (1974). The Greening of Judaism. Commentary, 58(6), 51–57.
- Sklare, M. (1974). The Jew in American Sociological Thought. Ethnicity.
- Marshall, S. (1974). Problems in the Teaching of Contemporary Jewish Studies. American Jewish Historical Quarterly, 63, 361–365.
- Sklare, M., & Waltham, M. (1974). Religion and Ethnicity in the American Jewish Community: Changing Aspects of Reform, Conservative, and Orthodox Judaism. The Role of Religion in Modern Jewish History, edited by Jacob Katz Association for Jewish Studies.
- Sklare, M. (1973). The conversion of the Jews. Commentary, 56(3), 44–53.
- Goldstein, S. Gordis, R., Sklare, M., Pollack, H., Blau, Z., Selig, M., & Lukinsky, J. (1972). Consultation on the Jewish Family and Jewish Identity: Proceedings. American Jewish Committee, April 1972 (AJC). pp. 1–158.
- Sklare, M. (1972). Jews, Ethnics, and the American City. Commentary, 53(4), 70–77.
- Sklare, M. (1970). Intermarriage and Jewish survival. Commentary, 3, 51–58.
- Sklare, M. (1970). The Problem of Contemporary Jewish Studies. Midstream, 16, 27–35.
- Sklare, M. (1969). The Ethnic Church and the Desire for Survival. In Peter I. Rose (ed.), The Ghetto and Beyond. New York: Random House.
- Sklare, M., Greenblum, J., & Ringer, B. (1969). Not Quite at Home: How an American Jewish Community lives with itself and its neighbors. Institute of Human Relations Press-Pamphlet Series. American Jewish Committee (AJC). pp. 1–95.
- Sklare, M. (1968). Lakeville and Israel: The Six-Day War and its Aftermath. American Jewish Committee (AJC). pp. 1–20.
- Sklare, M. (1967). The Image of the Good Jew in Lakeville. Observing America’s Jews.
- Sklare, M. (1965). Assimilation and the Sociologists. Commentary, 39, 63–67.
- Sklare, M. (1965). Intermarriage and the Jewish future. Commentary, 37 (4), 46, 51.
- Sklare, M. (1964). Intermarriage & the Jewish future. American Jewish Committee.
- Sklare, M. (1963). The Development and Utilization of Sociological Research The Case of the American Jewish Community. The Jewish Journal of Sociology, 5, 167–186.
- Sklare, M. (1962). The Future of Jewish Giving. American Jewish Committee.
- Sklare, M., & Vosk, M. (1962). The Riverton Study: How Jews Look at Themselves and Their Neighbors. American Jewish Committee (AJC). Fall 1962: 1--48.
- Sklare, M. (1961). American Jews and American Jewish Life Observations of a Sociologist. In Central Conference of American Rabbis Yearbook (Vol. 71, pp. 229–244).
- Sklare, M. (1960). Church and the Laity among Jews. The Annals of the American Academy of Political and Social Science, 332(1), 60–69.
- Sklare, M. (1956). The Function of Ethnic Churches: Judaism in the United States. JM Yinger, Religion, Society and the Individual (New York: Macmillan, 1957), 459–463.
- Sklare, M., Vosk, M., & Zborowski, M. (1955). Forms and Expressions of Jewish Identification. Jewish Social Studies, 17(3), 205–218.

== See also ==
- Association for the Social Scientific Study of Jewry
- Jewish identity
- BPJA.org author publication page
- American Jewish Committee
