= Dan Naveh =

Israeli former politician

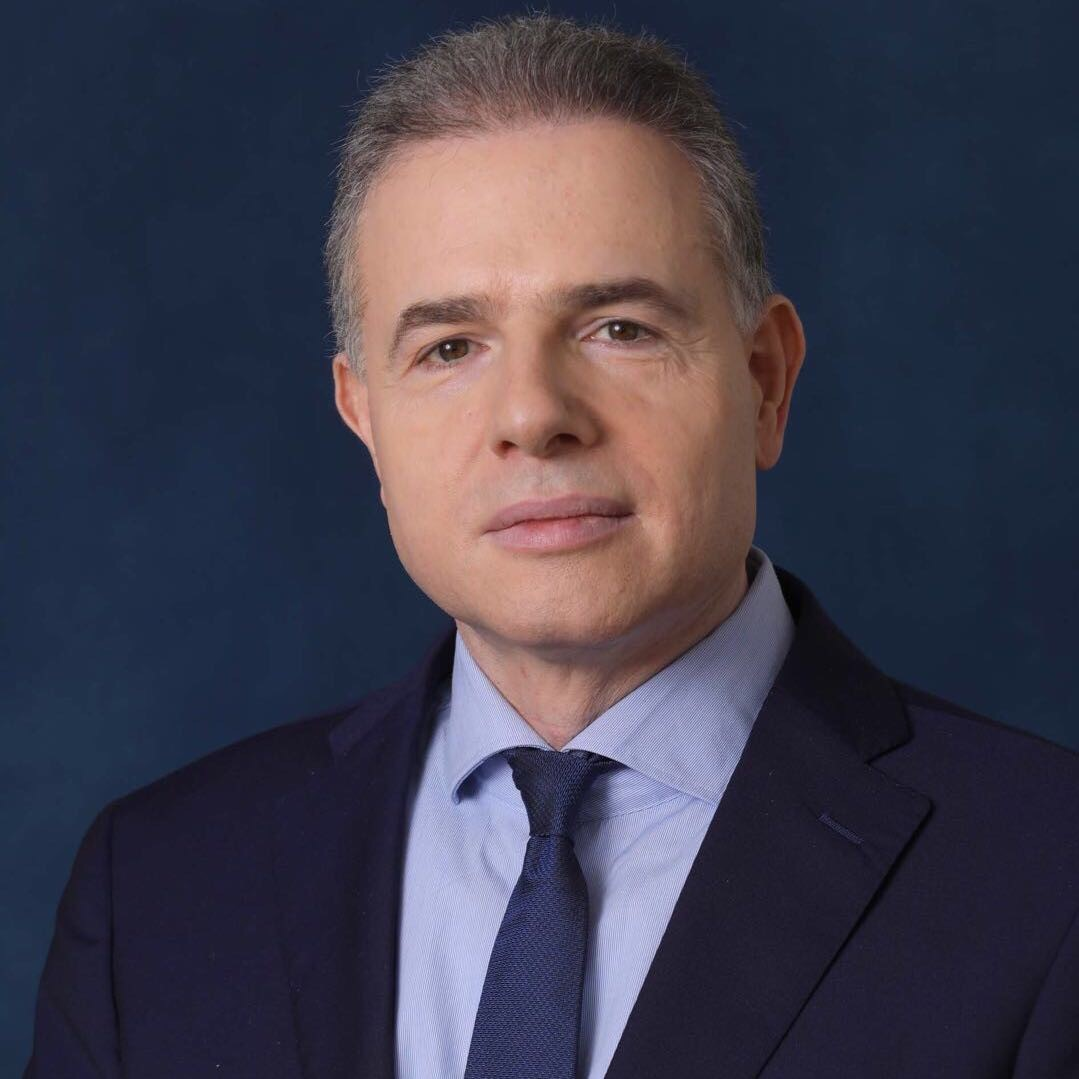
- Naveh in 2021

Ministerial roles
- 2001–2003: Minister without Portfolio
- 2003–2006: Minister of Health

Faction represented in the Knesset
- 1999–2007: Likud

Personal details
- Born: 21 June 1960 (age 66) Bnei Brak, Israel

Dani Naveh (Hebrew: דני נוה; born 21 June 1960) is an Israeli businessman and former politician. He served as a member of the Knesset for Likud between 1999 and 2007 and as a government minister from 2001 until 2006. He is the founder and the managing general partner of Agate Medical Investments, served for seven years as the chairman of Clal insurance, and is currently president and CEO of Israel Bonds.

== Biography ==
Born Dan Mannheim in Bnei Brak, Naveh studied at Yeshivat Netiv Meir in Jerusalem. In 1985 he graduated from the Hebrew University of Jerusalem with an LLB, and was admitted to the bar in 1986.

=== Political and media career ===
Naveh was an adviser to Minister Moshe Arens between 1986 and 1992 while Arens was a Minister without Portfolio (1986–87), Minister of Foreign Affairs (1988–90) and Minister of Defense (1990–92). After working with Arens, he was appointed editor of foreign news at the Haaretz newspaper. He then served as Cabinet Secretary from 1996 until 1999, a role in which he chaired the Israeli Steering Committee for the negotiations with the Palestinians, playing a central role in the Wye River Memorandum and the Hebron Protocol.

Naveh was elected to the Knesset on the Likud list in 1999. In 2001 new Prime Minister Ariel Sharon appointed him Minister in the Prime Minister's Office in the twenty-ninth government, in which capacity he acted as a liaison between the government and the Knesset. After being re-elected in 2003 he was appointed Health Minister in the new government. Naveh resigned from the government on 14 January 2006, along with the rest of the Likud members. He was re-elected in the 2006 elections, but resigned on 25 February 2007 and was replaced by Yuli-Yoel Edelstein. During his time in the Knesset he also served on the Foreign Affairs and Defense Committee, the Constitution, Law and Justice Committee, and Committee on the Rights of Children, as well as heading the Parliamentary Lobby for the Israeli MIAs.

During his term as Health Minister, his ministry failed to properly monitor imported baby formula, leading to the deaths of three infants and severe or potentially severe injury of more than 20 others from malnutrition. Five members of Naveh's ministry were indicted and charged with insufficient supervision.

=== Business career ===
Following his departure from politics, Naveh founded Health Care Venture Capital Group, which included three funds focused on MedTech and health care. In June 2013 he was appointed chairman of directors of Clal Insurance, a role he held until 2020.

As chairman of Clal, Naveh became embroiled in a "power struggle" with the CEO of the company Yoram Naveh, whom he wished to replace. A report by an external examiner determined there was a lack of evidence for Naveh having "illegitimate motives" for wanting to replace the CEO, but it did find that Naveh had circumvented the board because he was aware that a majority of the board members disagreed with his approach. Naveh subsequently resigned, saying this because he was not allowed to discuss replacing the CEO.

In May 2021 he founded Sure-Tech investments, a public partnership with a focus on investing in the fields of Insurtech and Fintech. He also has been involved with various cannabis ventures. In December 2021 he became president and CEO of the Israel Bonds, starting a five-year term.

=== Personal life ===
Naveh is married to Tsili, a former employee of Clal Insurance who served as the head of the Personal Injury Department during Naveh's tenure as the company's chairman. The couple has three children, Itay, Ilay and Yael.

== Published works ==
- Dan Naveh, Government Secrets, Yediot Aharonot publishing (in Hebrew)
