= Association for the Social Scientific Study of Jewry =

Jewish research organization

The Association for the Social Scientific Study of Jewry (ASSJ) is a cross-disciplinary organization of individuals whose research concerns the Jewish people throughout the world, founded in 1971.

== Purpose ==
The ASSJ comprises primarily academics, but also policy analysts, communal professionals, and activists whose research concerns the Jewish people throughout the world. Social scientific disciplines represented include sociology, social psychology, social anthropology, demography, contemporary history, social work, political science, economics, and Jewish education. Members work throughout the world but primarily in North America, Israel, and Europe.

The ASSJ encourages and facilitates contact among researchers, supports the dissemination of research, and assists in the cultivation of younger scholars.

== Past presidents ==
- Mervin F. Verbit (1971-1973)
- Marshall Sklare (1973-1975)
- Samuel Klausner (1975-1977)
- Celia Heller (1977-1979)
- Chaim Waxman (1979-1981)
- Harold Himmelfarb (1981-1983)
- Egon Mayer (1983-1988)
- Rela Mintz Geffen (1988-1990)
- Arnold Dashefsky (1990-1996)
- Allen Glicksman (1996-2000)
- Sherry Israel (2000-2005)
- Harriet Hartman (2005-2012)
- Steven M. Cohen (2012-2016)
- Leonard Saxe (2016-2020)
- Judit Bokser Liwerant (2020-2024)
- Ira Sheskin (2024-)

== Past vice presidents ==
- Harriet Hartman
- Shaul Kelner (2005-2008)
- Sylvia Barack Fishman (2008-2012)
- Sergio DellaPergola (2012-2016)
- Sarah Benor (2016-2018)
- Judit Bokser Liwerant (2018-2020)
- Laurence Kotler-Berkowitz (2020-2023)
- Ariela Keysar (2023-)

== Past treasurers ==
- Carmel Chiswick
- Gail Glicksman
- Bruce Phillips (2012-2015)
- Leonard Saxe (2015-2016)
- Matthew Boxer (2016-2021)
- Laurence Kotler-Berkowitz (2021-2024)
- Nadia Beider (2024-)

== Past secretaries ==
- Uzi Rebhun
- Benjamin Phillips (2008-2010)
- Theodore Sasson (2010-2012)
- Matthew Boxer (2012-2016)
- Jennifer Thompson (2016-2020)
- Bruce Phillips (2020-2023)
- Ilana Horwitz (2023-2024)
- Amir Segal (2024-)

== Past at-large members of the board ==
- Perla Aizencang
- Tobin Belzer
- Lila Corwin Berman
- Mijal Bitton
- Paul Burstein
- Barry Chiswick
- Steven M. Cohen
- Arnold Dashefsky
- Harriet Hartman
- Bethamie Horowitz
- Ilana Horwitz
- Ari Kelman
- Ariela Keysar
- Helen Kim
- Moshe Kornfeld
- Laurence Kotler-Berkowitz
- Dani Kranz
- Shawn Landres
- Lilach Lev Ari
- Laura Limonic
- Keren McGinity
- Bruce Phillips
- Riv-Ellen Prell
- Uzi Rebhun
- Sherry Rosen
- Leonard Saxe
- Randal Schnoor
- Ira Sheskin
- Ephraim Tabory
- Jennifer Thompson
- Dalia Wassner

== Past student representatives to the board ==
- Mijal Bitton
- Matthew Boxer
- Shaul Kelner
- Moshe Kornfeld
- Amir Segal
- Meredith Woocher

== Contemporary Jewry Journal ==
The organization publishes a journal, Contemporary Jewry, several times a year with research articles that draw on a range of social scientific fields and methodologies.

Editor-in-chief: Harriet Hartman
Associate editor: Adina Bankier-Karp
Book Review Editor: Ephraim Tabory
Research Editor: Ira Sheskin

== Book series ==
Studies of Jews in Society Published in concert with Springer Nature, Studies of Jews in Society takes a broad perspective on social science to include anthropology, communications, demography, economics, education, ethnography, geography, history, politics, population, social psychology, and sociology. Books may rely on quantitative methods, qualitative methods, or both.

The series is directed to social scientists and general scholars in Jewish studies as well as those generally interested in religion and ethnicity; academics who teach Jewish studies; undergraduates and graduate students in Jewish studies, sociologists interested in religion and ethnicity; and communal professionals and lay leaders who work in Jewish organizations and individuals. The style, while rigorous scientifically, is accessible to a general audience.

Editor: Chaim Waxman

== Awards ==
The Marshall Sklare Award The Marshall Sklare Award is an annual honor of the Association for the Social Scientific Study of Jewry (ASSJ). The ASSJ seeks to recognize "a senior scholar who has made a significant scholarly contribution to the social scientific study of Jewry." In most cases, the recipient has given a scholarly address. In recent years, the honored scholar has presented the address at the annual meeting of the Association for Jewish Studies. The award is named after sociologist Marshall Sklare.

Past recipients, fields of study, and the titles of their scholarly papers have been:

List of Marshall Sklare Award recipients
Year	Recipient(s)	Fields of study	Scholarly papers
1992	Sidney Goldstein	Demography	"Beyond the 1990 National Jewish Population Survey: A Research Agenda"
1993	Seymour Martin Lipset	Sociology	"Some Thoughts on the Past, Present and Future of American Jewry"
1994	Celia Heller	History	
1995	Daniel Elazar	Political Science	"The Future of American Jewry"
1996	Samuel Klausner	Sociology	"How to Think about Mass Religious Conversion: Toward an Explanation of the Conversion of American Jews to Christianity"
1997	Walter Zenner	Anthropology	"The Ethnography of Diaspora: Studying Syrian Jewry"
1998	Bernard Reisman	Communal Service	"Redefining Jewish Identity in North America"
1999	Sergio DellaPergola	Demography	"Thoughts of a Jewish Demographer in the Year 2000"
2000	Charles Liebman	Political Science	"Some Research Proposals for the Study of American Jews"
2001	Calvin Goldscheider	Sociology and Demography	"Social Science and the Jews: A Research Agenda for the Next Generation"
2002	Jonathan Sarna	History	"From Past to Present: Contemporary Lessons from the Study of American Judaism"
2003	Samuel Heilman	Sociology	"How did Fundamentalism Manage to Infiltrate Contemporary Orthodoxy?"
2004	Egon Mayer	Sociology	
2005	Elihu Katz	Communications	"Two Dilemmas of Religious Identity and Practice among Israeli Jews"
2006	Deborah Dash Moore	History	"On City Streets"
2007	Barry Chiswick	Economics	"The Rise and Fall of the Jewish Ph.D."
2008	Paul Ritterband	Sociology	"Smart Jews"
2009	Charles Kadushin	Sociology and Social Network Analysis	"Social Networks and Jews"
2010	Steven M. Cohen	Sociology	"The Demise of the 'Good Jew'"
2011	Riv-Ellen Prell	Anthropology	"Boundaries, Margins and Norms: The Intellectual Stakes in the Study of American Jewish Culture(s)"
2012	Leonard Saxe	Social Psychology	"Reflections on the Science of the Social Scientific Study of Jewry"
2013	Morton Weinfeld	Sociology	"If Canada and Israel are at War, Who Gets My Support? Challenges of Competing Diaspora Loyalties"
2014	Sylvia Barack Fishman	Sociology	"American Jewishness Today: Identity and Transmissibility in an Open World"
2015	Barbara Kirshenblatt-Gimblett	Performance Studies	"The Ethnographer in the Museum: Creating the Polin Museum of the History of Polish Jews"
2016	Bruce Phillips	Sociology	"Beyond Policy: Reviving Jewish Demography through Local Population Studies"
2017	Judit Bokser Liwerant	Political Science	"Latin American Jews in a Transnational World: Conceptual Paths and Shifting Paradigms"
2018	Arnold Eisen	Religious Studies	"Boomers, Millennials, and the Shape of American Judaism"
2019	Harriet Hartman	Sociology	"How Gender and Family Still Matter for Contemporary Jewry"
2020	Arnold Dashefsky and Chaim Waxman	Sociology	Dashefsky: "A Half-Century (1970–2020) of the Social Scientific Study of Jewry: Reflections and Projections on Past, Present, and Future"; Waxman: "Reflections on 50 Years of the Sociological Study of American Jewry: Statics and Dynamics"
2021	Ariela Keysar and Barry Kosmin	Demography	Keysar: "We Are All Jews"; Kosmin: "Impermanent Boundaries and the Secularization of the Jews"
2022	Debra Kaufman	Sociology and Women's Studies	"Studying the World with Us in It: Jewish Identities in the Twenty-First Century"
2023	Bethamie Horowitz and Ira Sheskin	Social Psychology (Horowitz), Geography (Sheskin)	Horowitz: "Navigating the Contemporary Terrain: Studying Jews and Jewishness in Changing Circumstances"; Sheskin: "'Where' Matters: The Importance of Geographic Factors in Understanding American Jewry"
2024	No award given		
2025	Uzi Rebhun	Demography	"Religion and Health: The Encounter of American Jews, Protestants, and Catholics with the COVID-19 Pandemic"
2026	Robert Brym	Sociology	

Mandell L. Berman Service Award The ASSJ presents the Mandell L. Berman Service Award periodically to communal, civic and business leaders, applied and academic researchers, and philanthropists, for distinguished commitment to the social scientific study of Jews through service or financial support.

List of Mandell L. Berman Service Award recipients
Year	Recipient(s)
2011	Irene and Eddie Kaplan
2012	Arnold Dashefsky (University of Connecticut)
2013	Rela Mintz Geffen (Gratz College)
2015	Barry Shrage (Combined Jewish Philanthropies of Greater Boston)
2017	Ambassador Stuart E. Eizenstat
2021	Joseph Neubauer and Jeanette Lerman-Neubauer (Neubauer Family Foundation) and Alan Cooperman (Pew Research Center)
2025	Harriet Hartman (Rowan University)

Judit Bokser Liwerant Distinguished Early Career Award The ASSJ's Judit Bokser Liwerant Distinguished Early Career Award will be given periodically to a recent PhD (within the past ten years) whose work reflects excellence in the application of social science theories and methods to the study of contemporary Jewry.

List of Judit Bokser Liwerant Distinguished Early Career Award recipients
Year	Recipient(s)	Fields of study
2022	Ilana Horwitz	Sociology
2023	Matthew Boxer	Sociology
2024	Nadia Beider	Jewish Education
2024	Aviad Moreno	Diaspora Studies
2026	Yehonatan Abramson	International Relations
2026	Cara Rock-Singer	Religious Studies

Arnold Dashefsky Graduate Student Paper Award This award recognizes outstanding research on contemporary Jewry by graduate students.

List of Arnold Dashefsky Graduate Student Paper Award recipients
Year	Recipient(s)	Honorable mention
2024	Shvat Eilat, "'Just forget about it and move on': Stillbirth ruptured and repaired narratives beyond expectant futures"	Sari Alfi-Nissan, "The Light within Me: Celebrating the Self through Jewish Holidays in Israeli Public-School Education"
2025	Timea Crofony, "Complexity Carriers and the Burden of Balance" Navigating Identity and Grief among Israeli Jewish Students in Post-October 7"; Tammar Friedman, "Embodying Tradition and Ascribing Meaning: Israeli Jewish Atheists Choosing to Circumcise Their Sons"	
