= 18Doors =

Jewish magazine

- Type: Magazine
- Format: Digital
- Founded: 1998
- Language: English
- Headquarters: Newton Upper Falls, Massachusetts
- Website: https://18doors.org/about-18doors/

18Doors is an American non-profit organization that provides assistance to Jewish interfaith families.

The predecessor to 18Doors was an online magazine founded in 1998 with a focus on helping Jewish interfaith families. In 2001, it was renamed InterfaithFamily and expanded its content to news and resources relevant to the interfaith community. In February 2020, it was renamed 18Doors. In addition to its online magazine, 18Doors has expanded to provide training and clergy to assist interfaith families in connecting Jewish life and Judaism. The organization developed the Rukin Rabbinic Fellowship program to appoint rabbis from the Reform, Conservative, Reconstructionist, and Humanist movements of Judaism to coordinate its interfaith efforts nationwide. As of April 2021, 18Doors had fellows in 22 American cities.
