= Sociology of Jewry =

Sociological theory/method in study of Jewish people/religion

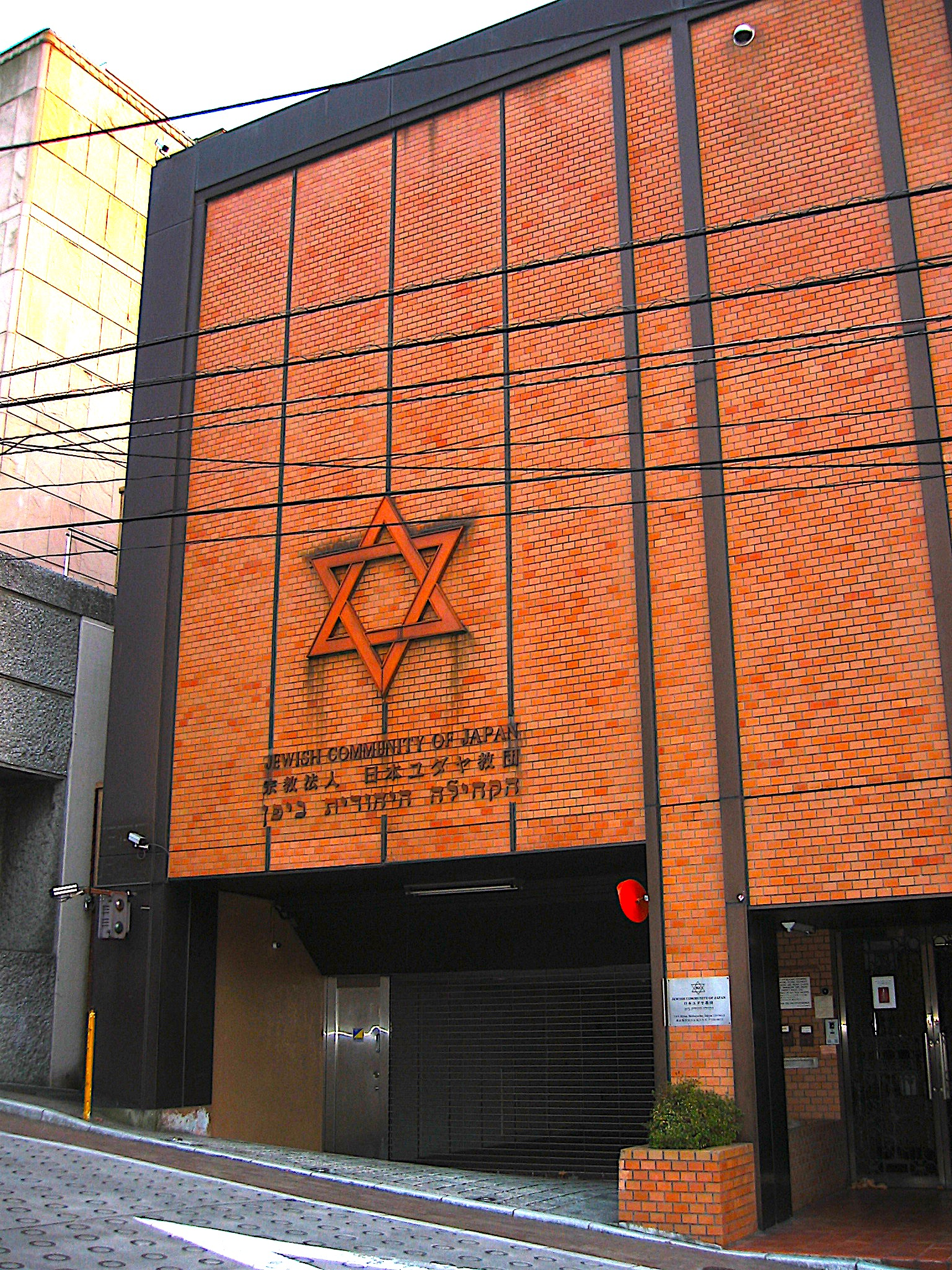
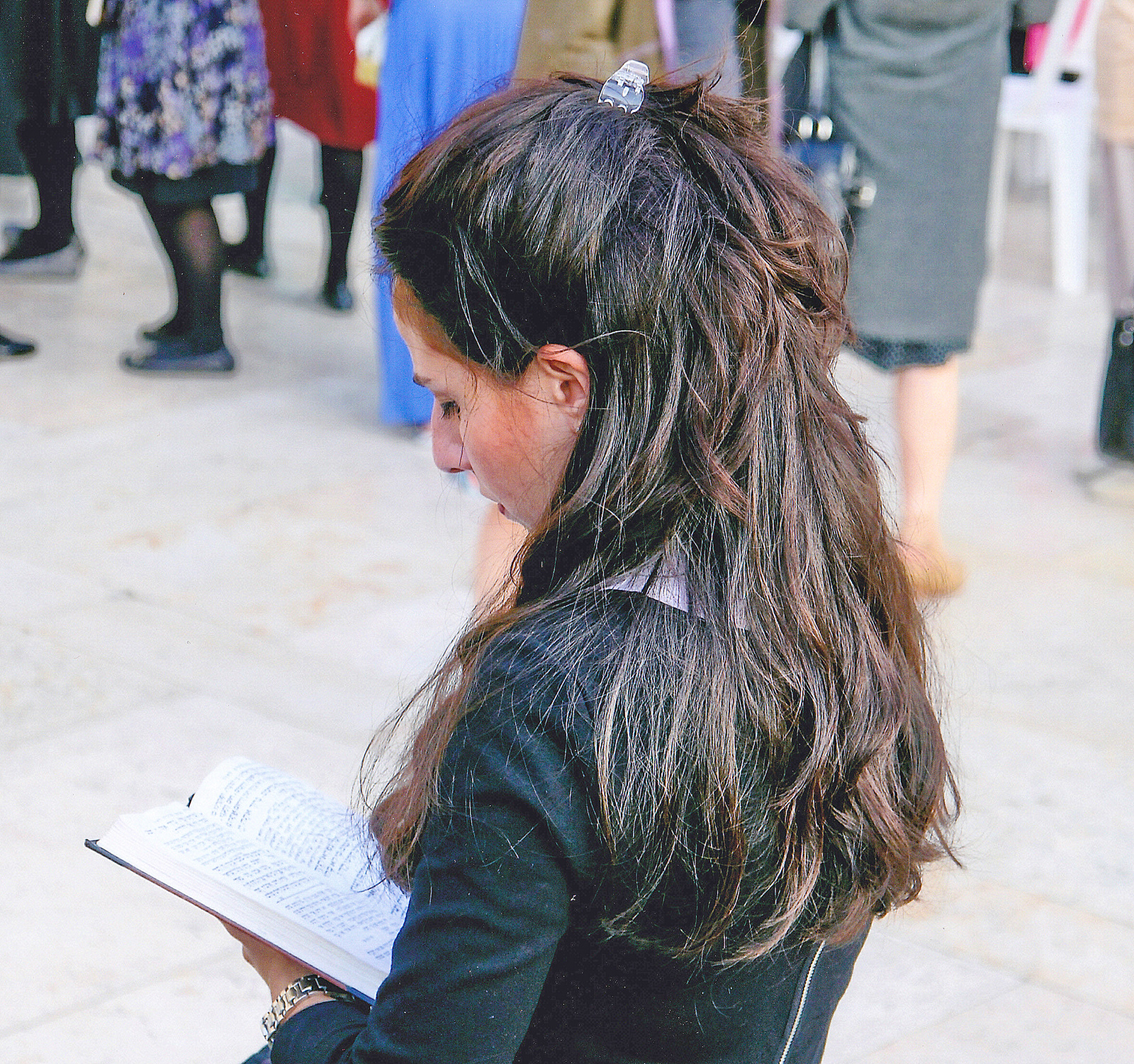
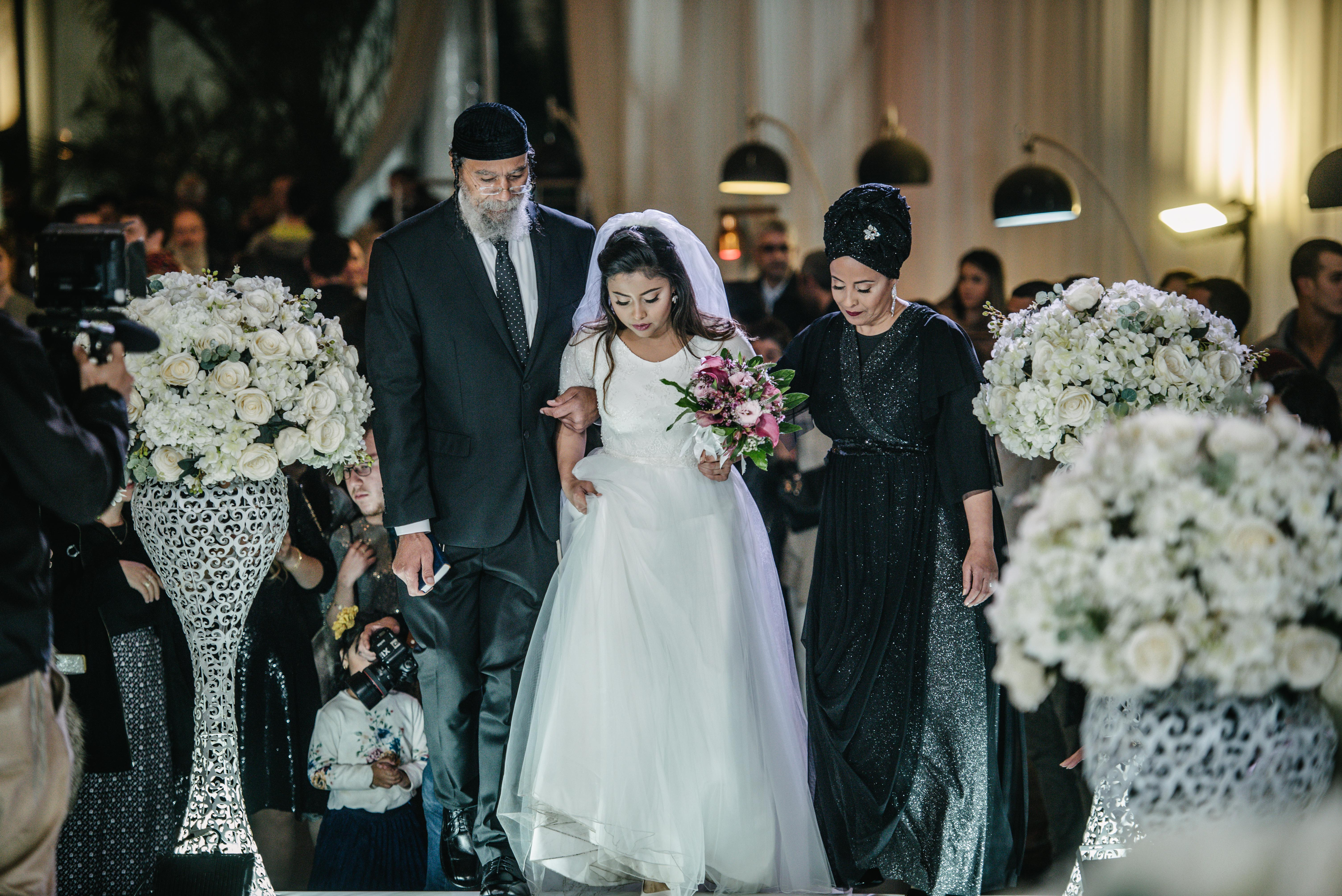
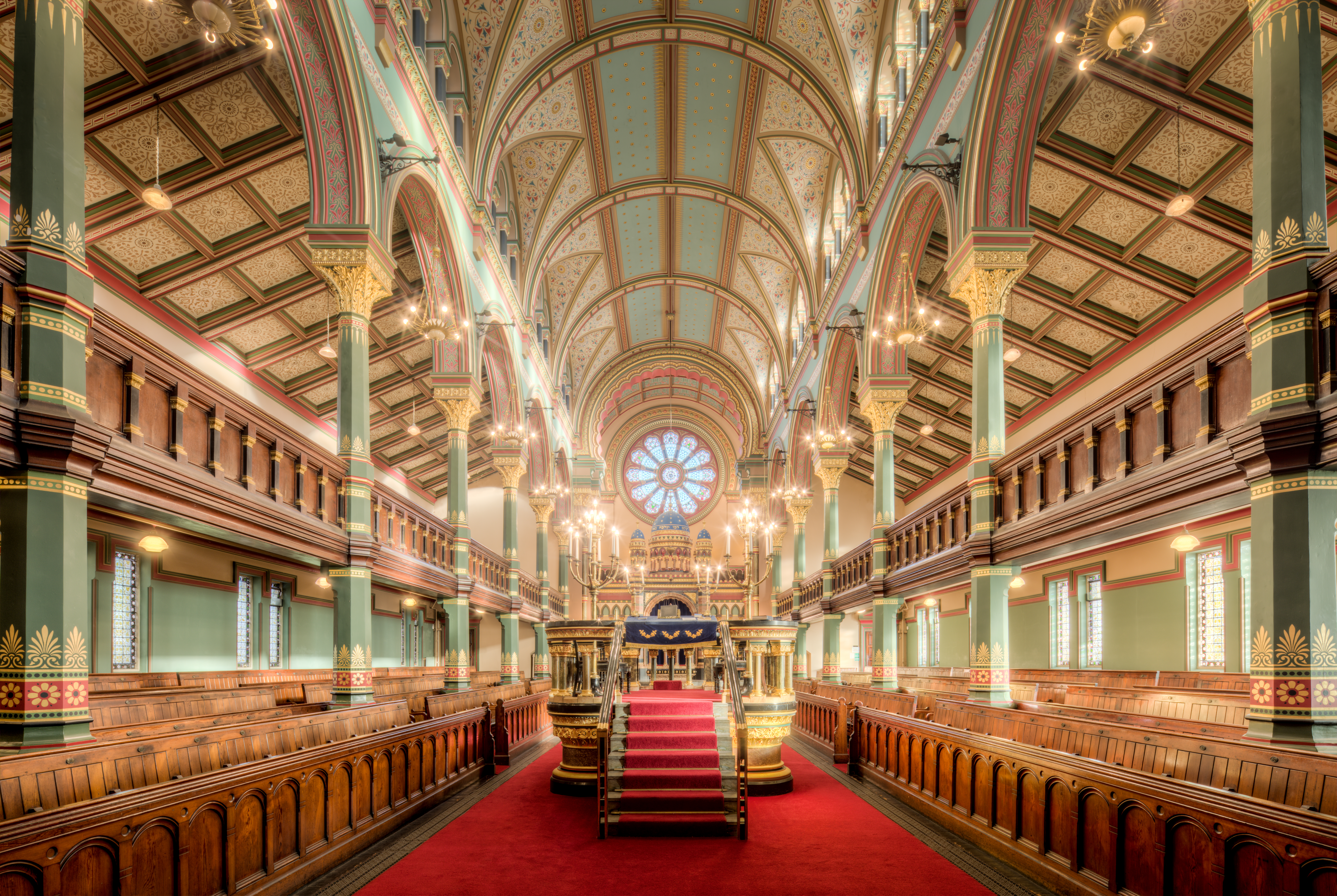
Jewish people and culture in society. Top-left: A picture of the Jewish Community Centre in Japan. Top-right: A woman reading at the Western Wall in East Jerusalem. Bottom-left: A Jewish bride and her family. Bottom-right: Princes Road Synagogue in Liverpool, UK.

The sociology of Jewry involves the application of sociological theory and method to the study of the Jewish people and the Jewish religion. Sociologists are concerned with the social patterns within Jewish groups and communities; American Jewry, Israeli Jews and Jewish life in the diaspora. Sociological studies of the Jewish religion include religious membership, ritual and denominational patterns. Notable journals include Jewish Social Studies, The Jewish Journal of Sociology and Contemporary Jewry.

== Emergence of the discipline ==
=== Beginnings: 1930s-1950s ===
Sociology of Jewry initially emerged in the United States in the 1930s beginning with the 1938 publication of Jewish Social Studies, sponsored by the Conference on Jewish Relations. The Journal's mission was "to promote, by means of scientific research, a better understanding of the position of Jews in the modern world." And the later publication of The Jewish Journal of Sociology in 1958 was due to the "few opportunities... for publishing academic and scientific studies of the sociology of Jews."

=== Growth and development: 1950s-present ===
In 1955, sociologist Seymour Lipset noted that the discipline was underdeveloped, stating that there were far more "Jewish sociologists" than "sociologists of Jews". However, the subfield began to grow in the late 1960s and 1970s. A professional organization was formed, namely the Association for the Social Scientific Study of Jewry (ASSJ). In 1975, a new academic journal was founded as well, Contemporary Jewry.

Contributing to this growth was the work of Marshall Sklare, now considered one of the founding figures in the sociology of Jewry. Marshall Sklare and Joseph Greenblum’s 1967 study of Jewish identity in “Lakeville” is considered one of the most notable works of its kind. The sociological study of intergroup relations and the theories proposed by Nathan Glazer and Daniel P. Moynihan is also thought to have contributed to the growth of the sociology of Jewry.

==== Formation of the ASSJ ====
The idea for the formation of a professional organization for scholars specializing in the sociology of Jewry first surfaced in 1966; the concept was discussed by Werner J. Cahnman and Norman L. Friedman at an American Sociological Association (ASA) conference. The association was informally launched by Norman Friedman and Bernard Lazerwitz in 1970; the event, titled "The Sociological Study of Jewry" took place at the ASA annual conference. Sociologists Solomon Poll, Mervin Verbit and Arnold Dashevsky submitted a motion to establish a formal group; the motion was voted upon and accepted. The new group, the Association for the Social Scientific Study of Jewry (ASSJ or ASSSJ) was launched and formally met the following year. The group has since organized annual conferences, established the academic journal Contemporary Jewry, founded the ASSJ Newsletter and honors exceptional scholars in the field with the Marshall Sklare Award.

While the ASSJ and Contemporary Jewry are dominated by sociologists and sociological studies - all but one of the organization's presidents earned a doctorate in sociology, the other received a doctorate in psychology - the focus has not been restricted to sociology alone. Studies involving other social sciences and history are included as well, and professionals from those disciplines have joined as members, contributors and honorees.

== General theories ==
=== American Jewry ===
According to sociologist Samuel Heilman, there are three major theoretical approaches in studying the sociology of American Jewry in particular:

- Uniqueness of Judaism and Particularism vs. Universalism - a popular theoretical approach towards understanding contemporary American Jewry has been the notion that more than anything else Judaism as a religion accounts for the social situation of U.S. Jews today. The current social and political decisions of the Jewish community are rooted in the response to the inevitable conflict between Jewish religious values on one hand, and secular American life on the other. Others, such as Milton Himmelfarb, focus less on the Jewish religion per se and focus on the tension produced by balancing the particularism of the Jewish tradition vs. the universalism of American modernity.
- Marginal culture - in the 1940s and 1950s, some scholars, such as Milton M. Goldberg, saw Jewish life in America as a successful "marginal culture," following the "marginal man theory" of Robert E. Park and Everett Stonequist popular at the time
- Community and organizations - a third approach stems from the work of political scientist Daniel J. Elazar and focuses and the underlying dynamics behind the decision making within Jewish community organizations.

While other theoretical approaches have been advanced they have not majorly impacted the discipline's research agenda.

- Applied sociology — Samuel Klausner, a former president of the ASSJ, noted that the sociology of Jewry is more an applied social science than a theoretical one. For Klausner, theories developed in sociology may help explain any society, not just a Jewish one. The contribution of the sociology of Jewry therefore is the application of the science, such as its methodology. Others, however, stress that the subfield is a part of general comparative sociology.

== Syllabi collections ==
=== 1946 syllabus ===
In 1946, Kurt H. Wolff, a student of Karl Mannheim, published “An Elementary Syllabus in the Sociology of the Jews” in Social Forces, a notable sociology journal. Wolff's aim was to provide an aid to including material on Jews in courses on race relations, social disorganization, minorities, and/or introductory sociology. Wolff's syllabus focused on three topics:

- Demographic changes following the aftermath of World War II and the Holocaust
- The "ethnic identifiability" of Jews
- Antisemitism

Later scholars have noted that Wolff's syllabus on the Sociology of Jewry sought to study external structures but ignored the internal dynamics of the Jewish community.

=== 1992 ASA syllabi collection ===
In 1992, Rabbi Jack Nusan Porter edited the first syllabus collection and curriculum guide on the Sociology of Jewry. The collection was published by the American Sociological Association (ASA). The collection included individual syllabi on the sociology of Jews from 34 colleges and universities. However, Porter found that many of the syllabi focused exclusively on Jewish life in America. And only 10 out of 34 syllabi were from sociology departments.

=== 2007 ASA syllabi collection ===
Paul Burstein of the University of Washington compiled an updated collection of syllabi on the sociology of Jewry. This collection was published by the American Sociological Association (ASA) in 2007. In his work, Burstein focuses on the following themes:

- Comparative historical approach, examining changing and evolving patterns of Jewish life in the last few hundred years
- Jewish life in North America, though focusing mostly on the United States
- Jewish life in Israel
- The Holocaust

Burstein notes gaps in specific areas. For example, while Black–Jewish relations in the U.S. is covered in the syllabi, relations between Jews and other groups is not. Also, there are few areas covered outside of American and Israeli Jewry.

== See also ==
- Jewish studies
- Wissenschaft des Judentums, the nineteenth-century Jewish studies movement in Germany
