= Stereotypes of multiracial people =

Generalized representations of multiracial people

Stereotypes of multiracial people are a set of generalized beliefs, assumptions, and social narratives, both positive and negative, about individuals who have mixed ancestry of two or more races.

Multiracial individuals are frequently subjected to exoticization, fetishization, narratives of racial ambiguity, and assumptions regarding identity confusion or social advantage. While some stereotypes portray mixed-race people as physically attractive, culturally adaptable, or genetically "advantaged," others depict them as socially unstable, marginalized, prone to violence, or lacking an authentic racial or cultural identity. Stereotypes about mixed-race individuals also vary depending on a person's specific racial background, the racial identities of their parents (e.g., White father–Asian mother versus Asian father–White mother), and broader racial stereotypes or social perceptions.

== Common ==
=== Physical attractiveness and exoticism ===
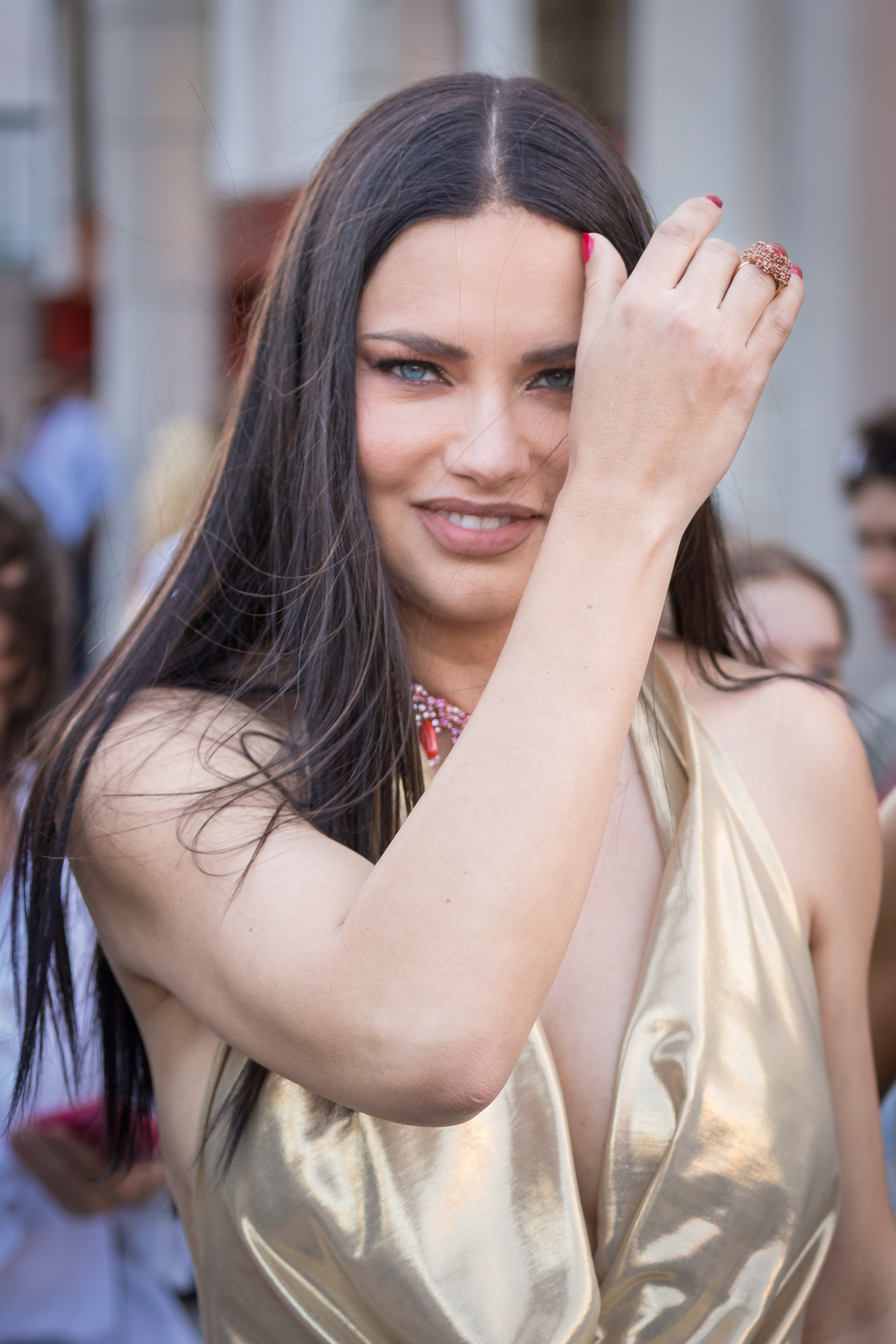
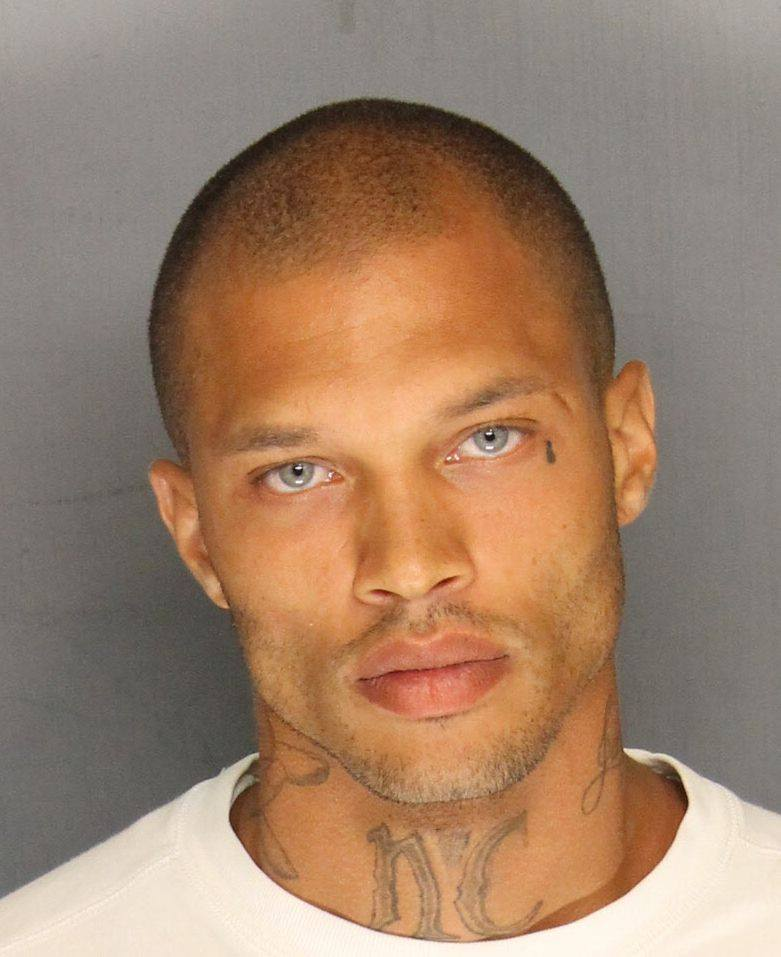
Stereotypes of mixed-race beauty are often exemplified by figures such as Adriana Lima and Jeremy Meeks.

Mixed-race people, especially women, are frequently stereotyped as physically attractive and racially ambiguous. This phenomenon is sometimes referred to as the "biracial beauty" stereotype. A number of studies conducted across various populations have shown that, on average, the faces of individuals with mixed ancestry are rated as more attractive than those of people from a single racial group. For instance, a 2024 study noted that individuals of mixed ancestry (such as Keanu Reeves or Zoë Kravitz) are perceived as more attractive, trustworthy, intelligent, and successful. This is partly attributed to the "averageness" of facial features—a well-known factor in the perception of beauty, where the combination of diverse traits results in a more symmetrical face. Some researchers link this to genetic heterozygosity or the averaging of facial features that occurs as a result of mixed ancestry.

This stereotype is often linked to the notion of "combining the best of both worlds", where multiracial people are perceived as possessing the most attractive traits from various racial groups (e.g., lighter skin tones, a diverse range of eye shapes and colors, or hair textures that differ from the standards associated with any single racial group, yet are perceived as aesthetically pleasing). This is particularly evident in the realms of media and fashion, where models and celebrities of mixed heritage, especially those with an ambiguous or "exotic" appearance, are featured in beauty campaigns with disproportionate frequency. This reinforces the idea of an "innate" aesthetic superiority, which can elicit both admiration and objectification.

In media representations, particularly in works of fiction and animation, mixed heritage is sometimes used to explain or justify unusual, "exotic" physical features that fall outside the bounds of realistic genetic patterns, thereby making a character's appearance more striking.

=== Genetically advantaged ===
In certain discourses, biological concepts such as heterosis (hybrid vigor) are used to argue that individuals of mixed racial ancestry possess genetic advantages. Specifically, it is sometimes claimed that they benefit from greater genetic diversity, which is thought to confer advantages in terms of health or physical appearance, provide a stronger immune system, offer increased resistance to certain diseases, or result in overall "robustness."

=== Social advantages ===
It is often assumed that people of mixed racial heritage possess a certain social flexibility or specific privileges. For instance, light-skinned individuals of mixed race may be able to "pass" as white and thereby gain the associated privileges. There is also a view that being raised within multiple cultures make them more worldly, adaptable, and capable of navigating or overcoming racial barriers.

=== Social rejection and identity crises ===
Throughout history, mixed-race individuals have often been perceived as outcasts, unable to fully "belong" to either of their respective racial groups. They may face questions regarding their identity or origins and encounter accusations of betraying one side of their heritage. Such attitudes can lead to social exclusion or pressure to choose one racial identity over another.

These stereotypes and the status of being an "outcast" can contribute to psychological distress among mixed-race individuals. Many report confusion regarding their self-identity when their racial belonging is called into question, a situation that often results in feelings of isolation, anxiety, or diminished self-esteem. This perception of marginality draws from the "marginal man theory" proposed by sociologists Robert Ezra Park and Everett Stonequist in the late 1920s, which characterized mixed-race individuals as psychologically unstable and culturally detached from their roots. In the U.S., the one-drop rule and the practice of hypodescent further reinforced this marginalization by categorizing individuals of mixed African and other ancestry primarily as Black, a group relegated to a lower social status.

=== Symbol of a "post-racial" future ===
Multiracial individuals are sometimes idealized and portrayed as harbingers of a future free from racism. According to this perspective, the growing number of individuals with a mixed racial background serves as evidence that, over time, racial categories will become increasingly less significant. Some observers suggest that prominent mixed-race figures—in politics, the entertainment industry, and other fields—symbolize the dawn of a new "post-racial" era. However, many researchers caution that such a view is overly optimistic and may obscure the reality that racism and colorism have not disappeared.

== See also ==
- Biracial and multiracial identity development
- Loving Day
- Miscegenation
- Mixed Race Day
- Multiracialism
- One-drop rule
- Passing (racial identity)
- Race of the future
- Stereotypes of groups within the United States
- Stereotype threat
