= Norman L. Friedman =

Norman Lee Friedman
- Education: University of Missouri
- Scientific career
- Fields: Sociology
- Workplaces: California State University, Los Angeles
- Thesis: (1965)

Norman Friedman is an American sociologist and the former chairman of the Department of Sociology at California State University, Los Angeles.

== Academic career ==
Friedman received his doctorate in sociology from University of Missouri in 1965. He served as the chairman of the Department of Sociology at California State University in Los Angeles, California.

=== Autobiographical sociology ===
Friedman coined the term "autobiographical sociology," defined as a "pathway to data and ideas that requires the sociologist introspectively recollect, reconstruct, and interpret the past phenomenon or process he/she was involved in."

== Formation of the ASSJ ==
Norman Friedman contributed to the growth and development of the field of the sociology of Jewry. In 1950s and 1960s, the field was quite underdeveloped; sociologist Seymour Lipset stated at the time that there were far more Jewish sociologists than "sociologists of Jews". One of the key points in the discipline's development was the formation of the a professional organization for sociologists specializing in the sociology of Jewry. The idea for the formation of a professional organization for scholars specializing in the sociology of Jewry first surfaced in 1966; the concept was discussed by Friedman and Werner J. Cahnman and at an American Sociological Association (ASA) conference. The association was informally launched by Friedman and Bernard Lazerwitz in 1970; the event, titled "The Sociological Study of Jewry" took place at the ASA annual conference. Sociologists Solomon Poll, Mervin Verbit and Arnold Dashefsky submitted a motion to establish a formal group; the motion was voted upon and accepted. Friedman served as the organization's secretary. The new organization, the Association for the Social Scientific Study of Jewry (ASSJ), formally met for the first time the following year.

== Publications ==
- Friedman, Norman L. "Point of view in fiction: The development of a critical concept." Publications of the Modern Language Association of America (1955): 1160–1184.
- Friedman, Norman L. "The public junior college teacher in unified public school system junior colleges: a study in the sociology of educational work." (1965).
- Friedman, Norman L. "New orders and old: Historians, educationists, and the dynamics of academic imperialism." American Behavioral Scientist 9, no. 2 (1965): 24–29.
- Friedman, Norman L. "Comprehensiveness and higher education: a sociologist's view of public junior college trends." AAUP Bulletin (1966): 417–423.
- Friedman, Norman L. "Career stages and organizational role decisions of teachers in two public junior colleges." Sociology of Education (1967): 231–245.
- Friedman, Norman L. "Nativism." Phylon (1960) (1967): 408–415.
- Friedman, Norman L. "The Subject Matterist Orientation toward Field of Academic Specialization." The American Sociologist (1967): 12–15.
- Friedman, Norman L. "The Problem of the" Runaway Jewish Intellectuals": Social Definition and Sociological Perspective." Jewish Social Studies (1969): 3-19.
- Friedman, Norman L. "Religion's subsystem: Toward a sociology of Jewish education." Sociology of Education (1969): 104–113.
- Friedman, Norman L. "Task Adaptation Patterns of New Teachers." Improving College and University Teaching 17, no. 2 (1969): 103–107.
- Friedman, Norman L. "American Movies and American Culture 1946–1970*." The Journal of Popular Culture 3, no. 4 (1970): 815–823.
- Friedman, Norman L. "Jewish or Professorial Identity? The Priorization Process in Academic Situations." Sociology of Religion 32, no. 3 (1971): 149–157.
- Friedman, Norman L. "Reflections of a Sociologist in a School of Education." School and Society 99, no. 2330 (1971): 41–3.
- Moles, Elizabeth R., and Norman L. Friedman. "The airline hostess: Realities of an occupation with a popular cultural image." The Journal of Popular Culture 7, no. 2 (1973): 305–313.
- Friedman, Norman L. "Orientations of Jewish professors to the Jewish community." Jewish Social Studies (1973): 264–282.
- Friedman, Norman L., and Frances M. Olson. "Post-Degree Careers of State College Terminal Master's Recipients in Sociology." Teaching Sociology 1, no. 1 (1973): 119–128.
- Friedman, Norman L. "Cookies and Contests: Notes on Ordinary Occupational Deviance and its Neutralization." Sociological Symposium, no. 11, pp. 1–9. VA Polytech University, 1974.
- Friedman, Norman L. "Some Contours." Reader in Media, Technology, and Libraries 18 (1975): 87.
- Friedman, Norman L. "Cultural deprivation: a commentary on the sociology of knowledge." Toward a New Sociology of Education 1, no. 2 (1978): 120.
- Friedman, Norman L. "Responses of blacks and other minorities to television shows of the 1970s about their groups." Journal of Popular Film and Television 7, no. 1 (1978): 85–102.
- Friedman, Norman L. "High School Substituting Task Demands and Adaptations in Educational Work." Urban Education 18, no. 1 (1983): 114–126.
- Friedman, Norman L. "On the “non-effects” of Jewish education on most students: A critique." (1984): 30-48.
- Friedman, Norman L. "Teaching about the Holocaust." Teaching Sociology (1985): 449–461.
- Friedman, Norman L. "Expansively 'Doing' Sociology: Thoughts on the Limits and Linkages of Sociological Practice." ASA Footnotes 15, no. 9 (1987): 11.
- Friedman, Norman L. "Reform Jewish Sunday School Primary Grades Department: An Ethnography." Journal of Jewish Education 55, no. 2 (1987): 18–26.
- Friedman, Norman L. "Books by Hollywood Stars: The Multiple Uses of Published Autobiographies." Journal of Popular Film and Television 17, no. 3 (1989): 113–122.
- Friedman, Norman L. "Autobiographical sociology." The American Sociologist 21, no. 1 (1990): 60–66.
- Friedman, Norman L. "The Hollywood actor: Occupational culture, career, and adaptation in a buyers’ market industry." Current Research on Occupations and the Professions 5 (1990): 73-89.
- Friedman, Norman L. "What do we really teach in introductory sociology textbooks? Three underlying messages and their instructional implications." The American Sociologist 22, no. 2 (1991): 137–145.
- Friedman, Norman L., and Susan Schuller Friedman. "Diversity management: An emerging employment/consulting opportunity for sociological practitioners." Clinical Sociology Review 11, no. 1 (1993): 16.
- Friedman, Norman L. "The Terminator: Changes in critical evaluations of cultural productions." The Journal of Popular Culture 28, no. 1 (1994): 73–80.
- Friedman, Norman L. "The Developing “Middle‐Position Consensus” about Contemporary American Morality and Religion." Journal of American Culture 18, no. 3 (1995): 27–31.
