= Makanuna fi Makan Akhar (Our Place is in Another Place) =

- Author: Mohammed Azeddine Tazi
- Subject: The world of immigration and immigrants
- Genre: Novel
- Publisher: Arab Press Agency
- Publication date: 2022
- Publication place: Egypt
- Pages: 155
- Preceded by: Sirat Salmon (Salmon's Biography)
- Followed by: Zahrat al-Aas (Myrtle Flower)

Makanuna fi Makan Akhar (Arabic: مكاننا في مكان آخر, lit. 'Our Place is in Another Place') is a novel by Moroccan writer Mohammed Azeddine Tazi, winner of the Morocco Book Award in 1977, the Al Owais Cultural Award for Story and Novel in 2013, and the Tayeb Salih International Award for Creative Writing for the novel in 2013. It was published in 2022 by the Arab Press Agency.

== Title analysis ==
In his creative works, Tazi is distinguished by his passion for writing about place, using it as a space to unleash the possibilities of writing. He evokes both Moroccan and foreign settings and features characters from various and multiple religious backgrounds: Islamic, Jewish, and Christian. The novel's title celebrates place and is a sentence spoken by a Tunisian Jewish immigrant who moved to Paris. He addresses the novel's heroine, the Moroccan immigrant Rabia Al-Saadi, suggesting that the natural place for immigrants is their home country, not the country of migration. The novel revolves around this statement, creating its events, settings, and details of daily life and various forms of suffering.

== Synopsis ==
The novel portrays the suffering before, during, and after immigration. It tells the story of Rabia, who was raped by a police officer. She later meets a young Frenchman in Marrakesh who falls in love with her and idolizes her, only to cast her aside after discovering she is cheating on him with an Algerian immigrant. Meanwhile, a character named Boufarah runs a YouTube channel where he details his daily life and his relationship with Rabia. Rabia, in turn, narrates the details of her life in a white room in front of a camera that records both audio and video.

== Themes ==
The novel addresses multiple themes, including identity, belonging, and the search for self. It revolves around the story of characters searching for their place in the world and seeking to define their identity in a changing and diverse context. The novel raises questions about belonging, identity, and the relationship between individuals and societies. It combines elements of realism and fantasy to depict the characters' experiences in their search for their place in the world.

== Characters ==
- Rabia Al-Saadi
- Mohammed Boufarah
