= Menachem Friedman =

Israeli Emeritus Professor (1936–2020)

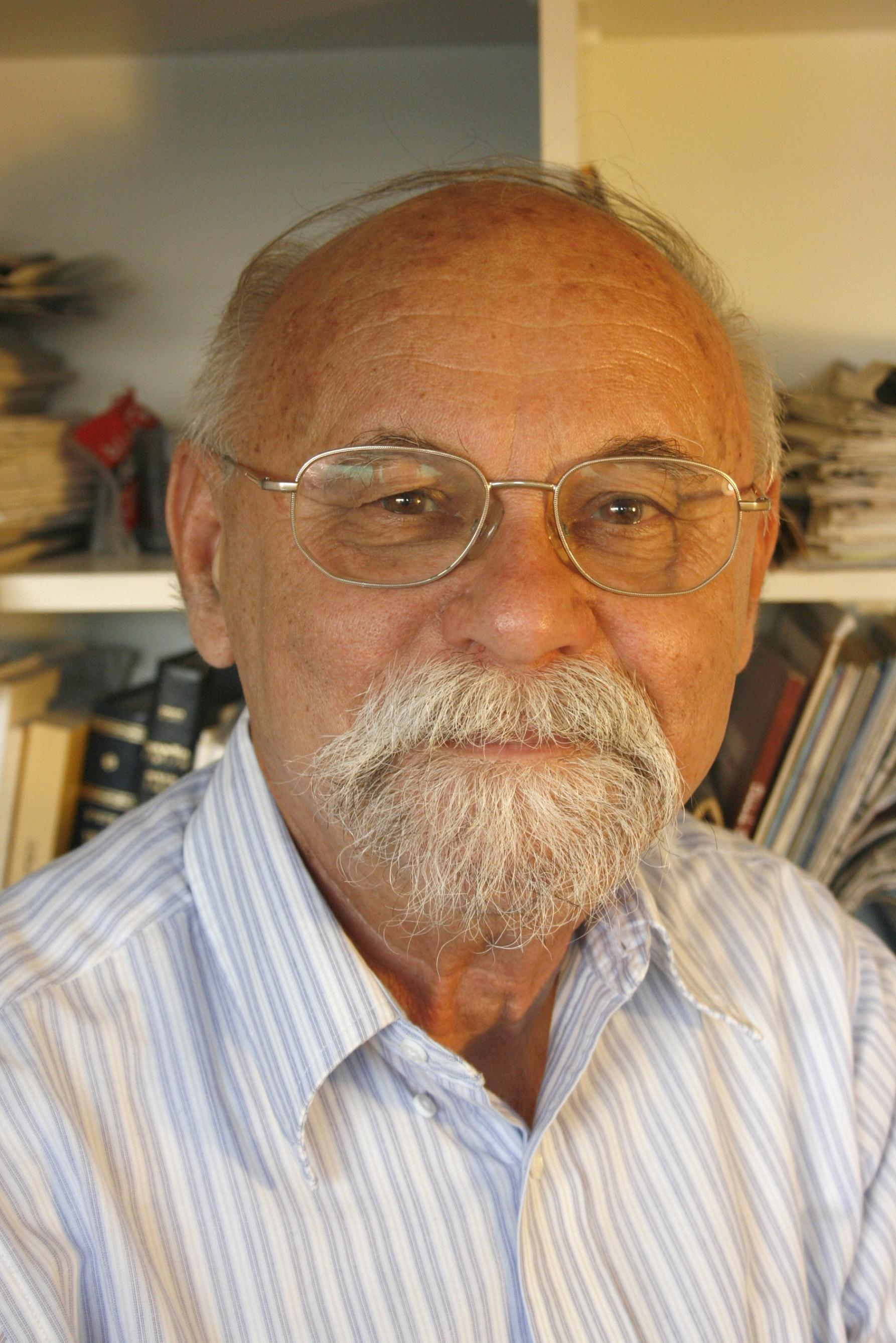
Menachem Friedman

Menachem Friedman (Hebrew: מנחם פרידמן; born 1936 – 16 March 2020) was an Israeli Emeritus Professor of sociology at Bar Ilan University, Ramat-Gan. His expertise was religion and the confrontations between religious and secular Judaism in modern history. He also studied the modern process of Halachic decision making. Friedman was considered one of the leading researchers of Haredi Judaism.

== Biography ==
Friedman was born and raised in Bnei Brak, British Mandate of Palestine to Jewish parents. Before entering the academic world, Menachem Friedman was a student at Yishuv Hehadash yeshiva in Tel Aviv. He studied for about a year at the Hebron Yeshiva in Jerusalem

== Academic career ==
Friedman's interest in the Lubavicher rebbe led to the publication of a book co-authored with Samuel Heilman: "The Rebbe: The Life and Afterlife of Menachem Mendel Schneerson". Many of their conclusions, as well as their methodology and research, were criticized by Chaim Rapoport - - in "The Afterlife of Scholarship – A Critical Review of 'The Rebbe' by Samuel Heilman and Menachem Friedman". Friedman was also criticised for not disclosing that he had served as an expert witness against the rebbe in a lawsuit involving ownership of the Chabad library, which invited suspicion of bias., whereas Rapaport is a rabbi closely associated with the Lubavicher sect.

== Published works ==
- Society and Religion: The Non-Zionist Orthodoxy in Eretz-Israel, 1918–1936. Jerusalem, Yad Ben-Zvi, 1st edition, 1978; 2nd edition, 1982. (Hebrew).
- Growth and Segregation – The Ultra-Orthodox Community of Jerusalem, (with J. Shilhav), The Jerusalem Institute for Israel Studies, Jerusalem 1986 (Hebrew).
- The Haredi Ultra-Orthodox Society: Sources Trends and Processes, The Jerusalem Institute for Israel Studies, Jerusalem 1991 (Hebrew).
- Society in a Crisis of Legitimization – The Ashkenazi Old Yishuv – 1900–1917, Mosad Byalik & The Israeli Academy of Science 2001, (Hebrew).
- Haredi Violence in Contemporary Israeli Society, P. Medding (ed.), Studies in Contemporary Jewry, Vol. 18, 2002, pp. 186–197.
- Haredim and Palestinians in Jerusalem, M.J. Bereger and O. Ahimeir (eds.), Jerusalem, a City and its Future, Syracuse University Press, 2002, pp. 235–254.
- The Rebbe: The Life and Afterlife of Menachem Mendel Schneerson (with S. Heilman), Princeton University Press, Princeton 2010 (English).
