= Best of Both Worlds =

Best of Both Worlds may refer to:

== Albums ==
- Best of Both Worlds (Davina album), 1998
- Best of Both Worlds (Midnight Oil album), 2004
- The Best of Both Worlds (Jay-Z and R. Kelly album), 2002, or the title song
- The Best of Both Worlds (Marillion album), 1997
- The Best of Both Worlds (Van Halen album), 2004

== Songs ==
- "Best of Both Worlds" (Robert Palmer song), 1978
- "Best of Both Worlds" (Van Halen song), 1986
- "The Best of Both Worlds" (song), theme song to the 2006 television series Hannah Montana
- "Best of Both Worlds", a song written by Don Black and Mark London, initially recorded in 1968 by Lulu and Scott Walker
- "Best of Both Worlds", a song from the Midnight Oil album Red Sails in the Sunset

== Tours ==
- Best of Both Worlds Tour (Jay-Z and R. Kelly), 2004 R. Kelly & Jay-Z tour
- Best of Both Worlds Tour (Miley Cyrus), the 2007–2008 concert tour headlining Miley Cyrus and her alter-ego Hannah Montana

== Other ==
- A stereotype of multiracial people reflecting cultural adaptability
- Hannah Montana and Miley Cyrus: Best of Both Worlds Concert, a 2008 American concert film
- "The Best of Both Worlds" (Star Trek: The Next Generation), a 1990 two-part episode of Star Trek: The Next Generation
- The Best of Both Worlds (musical), a 2005 musical
- "The Best of Both Worlds" (Saturday Night Live), a recurring SNL sketch featuring Andy Samberg
