= Samuel Heilman =

American sociologist (born 1946)

Samuel C. Heilman
- Born: May 26, 1946 (age 80); Karlsruhe, West Germany
- Occupations: Sociologist/social anthropologist, professor, writer
- Writing career
- Notable awards: National Jewish Book Awards, Koret Jewish Book Award, Marshall Sklare Memorial Award

Samuel C. Heilman is a professor of sociology at Queens College, City University of New York, who focuses on social ethnography of contemporary Orthodox Jewish movements.

== Personal ==
Heilman was born in May 1946, to Henry and Lucia Heilman, both Polish survivors of the Holocaust who were saved by Oskar Schindler. After World War II, the family went to West Germany with the encouragement of the American occupation forces, who wanted a Jewish presence there. Heilman is married to Ellin Marcia Heilman, a psychologist in private practice. Together, they live in New Rochelle, New York and have four children - Adam, Uriel, Avram, and Jonah.

Heilman identifies as an Orthodox Jew, a member of the same group which he professionally studies.

He received his Ph.D. from the University of Pennsylvania.

== Scholarship ==
Heilman holds the Harold Proshansky Chair in Jewish Studies at the CUNY Graduate Center, and is a Distinguished Professor of Sociology at Queens College, City University of New York. Heilman has been frequently quoted in, and written op-ed pieces for various publications that reflect his standing as a respected voice on issues relating to American Jewish life.

== Honors and awards ==
In 2003, Heilman won the Marshall Sklare Memorial Award for his lifetime of scholarship from the Association for the Social Scientific Study of Jewry. He also was awarded the highest university rank of Distinguished Professor of Sociology by the City University of New York.

Heilman is also the recipient of fellowships from the National Science Foundation, the National Endowment for the Humanities, the American Council of Learned Societies, the Memorial Foundation for Jewish Culture, and the Mellon Foundation. He received a Distinguished Faculty Award from the City University of New York in 1985 and 1987. He has been a member of the board of the Association for Jewish Studies, the YIVO Annual and the Max Weinreich Center.

=== For his books ===
The Rebbe: The Life and Afterlife of Menachem Mendel Schneerson, was declared a 2011 Outstanding Academic Title by Choice Magazine and was winner of a 2010 National Jewish Book Award. The Gate Behind the Wall, was honored with the Present Tense Magazine Literary Award for the best book of 1984 in the "Religious Thought" category. A Walker in Jerusalem received a National Jewish Book Award in the Israel category in 1987 and Defenders of the Faith was a finalist for the National Jewish Book Award for 1992. Portrait of American Jewry: The Last Half of the 20th Century was honored with the 1996 [first] Gratz College Tuttleman Library Centennial Award. When a Jew Dies won both the Koret Award in 2003 and a National Jewish Book Award for Jewish Thought in 2001.

== Criticism ==
As a scholar who writes about different sectors of the Jewish community, Heilman's statements have been a target for both praise and criticism.

In Commentary, Dr. Moshe Krakowski, a researcher in Jewish education, examined Heilman's Sliding to the Right. Krakowski considers it one of the foundational works used by academia to study Haredi judaism. He leveled criticism at its methods and conclusions, claiming that it placed a Haredi community where there was none due to erroneous sampling and erroneous conclusions from the sample data.

Together with Menachem Friedman, Heilman authored "The Rebbe: The Life and Afterlife of Menachem Mendel Schneerson". Aside from the book's selection as a recipient of the 2012 National Jewish Book Award, Publishers Weekly called the book an "outstanding biography", as did the Library Journal. Allan Nadler writing in the Forward called it "lively and provocative" and pointed to its "rich" chapters". In Moment, former poet laureate Robert Pinsky praised the book, as did Jewish Ideas Daily, the Tablet, the Jewish Post and Opinion and many others. The book was also reviewed in the feature story The New York Times.

Despite these accolades, some of the author's conclusions, as well as their methodology and research, were later criticized by some, including Chaim Rapoport, in a book titled The Afterlife of Scholarship - A Critical Review of 'The Rebbe' by Samuel Heilman and Menachem Friedman. (Friedman was also criticized for not disclosing that he had served as an expert witness against the rebbe in a lawsuit involving ownership of the Chabad library, which may invite suspicion of an agenda-driven or biased opinion. Heilman responded that "we have no ax to grind".)

Shortly after publication Orthodox Rabbi Shmuley Boteach criticized the book, writing in The Jerusalem Post that the book's central thesis had a "fatal flaw", though he concluded that the book had "merit" and provided a "humanizing portrait." David Klinghoffer asserted that "there are peculiar omissions and contradictions. ... Readers of this biography may wonder if the authors have failed to grasp their subject", in his review for London's Jewish Chronicle. Jonathan Mark of the New York Jewish Week derided the book in a review, including a section where he referred to a "spitball [rather than] any substantiated academic conclusion, not what you'd expect from a pair of professors who demand to be taken seriously."

== Controversy ==
In 1996, Heilman was quoted in the press as opposing the appointment of Thomas Bird as head of the Jewish Studies program at Queens College. Bird, a Catholic, had taught Yiddish and other subjects at Queens College for over twenty years, and Heilman was quoted as saying that, "Jewish Studies exists to give Jewish students a role model just like any other Ethnic Studies program," and "the person who heads the program is more than just a teacher. He's someone who stands for the group." Leon Wieseltier, literary editor for the New Republic, criticized Heilman for "behaving like a tribalist". Queens College President Allen Sessoms also criticized Heilman, though he subsequently appointed the late Dr. Benny Kraut, an Orthodox Jew, as head of the program.

== Works ==
Heilman is the author of a number of articles and reviews, as well as many books. His books include:

- Synagogue Life 2017
- The People of the Book 2017
- The Gate Behind the Wall 1985
- A Walker in Jerusalem 1986
- Cosmopolitans and Parochials: Modern Orthodox Jews in America 1989 (with Steven M. Cohen)
- Defenders of the Faith: Inside Ultra-Orthodox Jewry 1999
- Portrait of American Jews: The Last Half of the 20th Century 1995
- When a Jew Dies: The Ethnography of a Bereaved Son 2012
- Sliding to the Right: The Contest for the Future of American Jewish Orthodoxy 2006
- The Rebbe: The Life and Afterlife of Menachem Mendel Schneerson 2012 (with Menachem Friedman)
- Death, Bereavement, and Mourning 2017 (editor) (Transaction Books)
- Following similar paths : what American Jews and Muslims can learn from one another 2024 (with Mucahit Bilici)
- Who Will Lead Us: The Story of Five Hasidic Dynasties in America 2019

Heilman is a frequent contributor to a number of magazines and newspapers. For a time, he was a regular columnist for The Jewish Week, and was editor-in-chief of Contemporary Jewry from October 2003 to April 2015.
