= Marginal man theory =

Sociology concept

Marginal man or marginal man theory is a sociological concept first developed by sociologists Robert Ezra Park (1864–1944) and Everett Stonequist (1901–1979) to explain how an individual suspended between two cultural realities may struggle to establish his or her identity.

== Marginal man ==
The term "marginal man" was first coined by sociologist Robert Ezra Park in 1926 to describe an individual influenced by two differing ethnic or racial groups. According to Park:

One of the consequences of migration is to create a situation in which the same individual—who may or may not be a mixed blood-finds himself striving to live in two diverse cultural groups. The effect is to produce an unstable character-a personality type with characteristic forms of behavior. This is the "marginal man."

Sociologist Everett Stonequist elaborated on the theme in his 1937 book The Marginal Man:

The marginal man… is one whom fate has condemned to live in two societies and in two, not merely different but antagonistic cultures…. his mind is the crucible in which two different and refractory cultures may be said to melt and, either wholly or in part, fuse.

== Marginal culture ==
In the 1950s, sociologist Milton M. Goldberg expanded Park and Stonequist's "marginal man" concept labeling it "marginal culture." In the 1940s and 1950s, the "marginal man" and "marginal culture" concepts were used as grand theories for explaining the sociology of American Jewry.

== See also ==
- Bicultural identity
- Double consciousness, a similar term coined by W. E. B. Du Bois
