= Multiracialism =

Existence of multiple racial groups within a single country

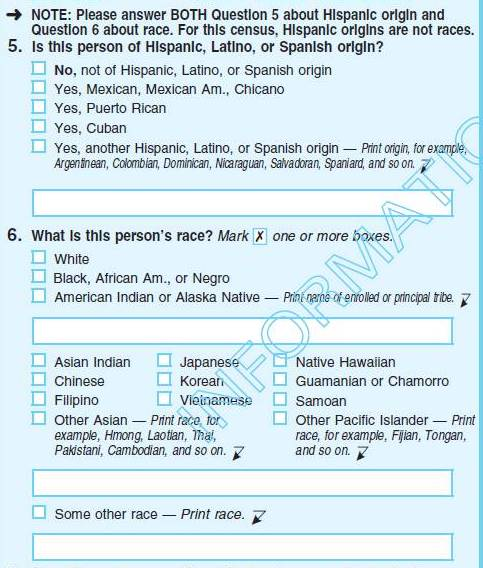
U.S. Census Bureau survey section on race from 2010. This was the second time the United States allowed individuals to indicate more than one race on the census.

Multiracialism is a conceptual framework for theorizing and interpreting identity formation in global multiracial populations. Multiracialism explores the tendency for multiracial individuals to identify with a third category of 'mixed' instead of being a fully accepted member of multiple, or any, racial group(s). As an analytical tool, multiracialism emphasizes that societies are increasingly composed of multiracial individuals, warranting a broader recognition of those who do not fit into a society's clear-cut notions of race. Additionally, multiracialism also focuses on what identity formation means in the context of oppressive histories and cultural erasure.

Multiracial identities have manifested across cultural identities, historical moments, and social norms. What it means to be multiracial changes depending on the society in question. As a result, multiracialism is often used to critique the continuation of race as a means of social categorization, especially given that race is a social and political construct that has served systems of oppression and systematically overlooked large populations that fall between its limited categorizations.

== Conceptual history ==
As argued by King et al. in Global Mixed Race, racial mixing and multiracial identities have existed for centuries. The emergence of multiracial identities in the United States is often attributed to the repeal of anti-miscegenation laws and the subsequent legalization of interracial marriages. However, this has been disproven by documented histories of miscegenation in the United States beginning in the 17th and 18th centuries. Furthermore, anti-miscegenation laws weren't established globally, problematizing the scope of this argument's relevance transnationally. Instead, the emergence and growth of multiracial populations can be more accurately attributed to global and transnational phenomena such as changes in trade patterns and migration flows due to historical events, colonization, and globalization.

Additionally, the application of multiracialism, as well as the size of a nation's multiracial population, will be unique across societies. This can be attributed to the function of race as a social and political construct, which was developed to distribute resources and determine status within societies more easily. The nature of race as a construct leads to racial ideals adopting additional or contrary meanings across different societies. Furthermore, the meaning societies associate with other racial groups evolves over time. Increased opportunities for interracial relationships and interaction are often attributed to what scholars Small and King-O’Riain call tenets of globalization, providing opportunities for racial learning and a less hegemonic understanding of unfamiliar racial groups. Small and King-O’Riain contend that globalization has opened new avenues for increasing hybridity and social acceptance of multiracial identities while recognizing that the nature of race as a construct means that these global conversations on racial ideals will manifest differently across local contexts.

== Regional racial classification ==
=== Brazil ===
The colonial history of Brazil established the framework for the system of racial hierarchy present in the nation today. Colonial ties to Portugal provided the opportunity for European racial ideals to enter Brazil and establish Eurocentric racial projects. One of the most impactful social influences established by Portugal was the incorporation of Brazil into the African slave trade. This industry was extensive, leading Brazil to be considered one of the two largest slaveholding nations in the Americas with records showing that Brazil imported ten times as many slaves as the United States, and estimates holding that approximately 3.6 million Africans were brought to Brazil during the three and a half centuries of Portuguese rule. Not only did these circumstances lead to the circulation of racial ideology, but they also constructed a unique racial distribution within Brazil.

Despite a lack of data during the early colonial period, scholars widely accept that white settlers in Brazil made up a minority of the population throughout this era. In 1600, the white residents in Brazil amounted to merely one-third of the population, and estimates show that by 1798 the population of 3 million was composed of around 1,000,000 white Brazilians, 1,500,000 slaves, 225,000 Freed Coloreds (typically individuals of multiracial heritage), and 250,000 Native Americans.

The increasing number of Africans in Brazil led to this population supplementing and eventually replacing the Native American labor force. These three categories—European, African, and Native American—were placed within a racial hierarchy established around a Eurocentric agenda; the particular system implemented in Brazil was known as the ternary racial project, which anthropologist Gilberto Freyre popularized. This system was established to validate the nation's extensive miscegenation practices, creating three categories of classification: white, multiracial, and black. Brazil never passed anti-miscegenation laws, and instead, viewed miscegenation as a means to whiten the Brazilian population slowly. But focusing on this lack of legalized racial discrimination resulted in the misconception that Brazilian society was also free of racism, a concept known as "racial democracy," wherein Brazil was free of discrimination such as segregation and racial violence. The theory of "racial democracy" was further developed in the 1930s to reconcile nationalist anti-immigration sentiment, the perceived failure of the state initiative to whiten Brazil, and the growing multiracial population. Freyre interpreted Brazil's mixed-race population as being the defining characteristic of Brazil: a country where one could live in a harmonious, multiracial society.

In line with this agenda, social status in Brazil was not exclusively determined by race; instead, it can be argued that an individual's social identity is more impacted by physical appearances combined with class and cultural practices. By creating a third category in the ternary system, multiracial individuals were given more vertical social mobility than Brazilians of African descent. However, multiracial identities were further stratified, with the order of desirability being as follows: mamelincos (European and Native American), mulatto (European with African), and catusos (Native American and African); wherein mamelincos and mulatto identities had more opportunities for mobility than those of catusos heritage.

Further effects of the ternary system are seen in how Brazilian slave holders incorporated the population of Freed Coloreds, typically mulattos, as enforcers of the racial hierarchy. By buying into the enforcement of the status quo, multiracial individuals were emplacing themselves in this system, both as superior to black Brazilians and complacent as second-class citizens to white Brazilians. This is further explained through the “mulatto escape hatch”, wherein individuals who were visibility of mixed heritage would be granted situational permission to identify as white due to their talents and assets such as education level or learned skills. By employing this social strategy in the context of the ternary system, Brazilian elites could keep the most outspoken and skilled multiracial individuals from critiquing the unequal status quo. Due to the operation of this racialized system, it became favorable for Brazilians to present themselves as belonging to Native American or European heritages while simultaneously distancing themselves from African descent.

Although deeply rooted in the nation's colonial past, identity formation in Brazil has and continues to be confronted and changed. Evidence of this is seen in the 1970s through Brazil's Black Movement, and the counter movement in 2001 known as Brazil's Multiracial Movement. These incidents, among other modern developments in Brazilian politics, have shifted racial discourse in the nation.

Interviews conducted by the National Public Radio (NPR) in 2019 consulted Brazilians on their experiences with multiracialism in their nation and how this impacts self-identification. The report focused on the affirmative action mandate established as federal law in Brazil in 2014. This policy enacted a quota wherein 20% of students accepted to federal universities and 20% of all employees working civil service jobs must be black. By establishing benefits in the form of increased quality of education and financial security, NPR substantiated that the government of Brazil had provided the population with an incentive to (re)claim African heritage. And with such an extensive history of multiracial descent, it is difficult to determine whether an applicant is actually of African descent visually. Each individual who indicates black on these applications must be verified by the anti-fraud commission and determined to be black based upon facial features—a process informed by Brazilian society's tendency to prioritize appearance over heritage in terms of identity formulation.

=== United States ===
The colonial history of the United States has provided the basis for the nation's current race relations. As European colonial empires expanded in the late fifteenth and early sixteenth centuries, European constructions of race were spread globally. The concepts of race and racial hierarchies were developed as a means to justify emerging forms of exploitation during the colonial era. These emerging social constructs provided a framework for societies to categorize individuals and subsequently place them within a hierarchy, typically seen with what is defined as ‘white’ at the top and ‘black’ at the bottom. Professor of sociology, G. Reginald Daniel, elaborates that these systems were ultimately constructed and employed as a means by which the practice of enslaving Africans could be defended.

Slavery provided the context for the emergence of multiracial identities in colonial America as African slaves and European indentured servants formed interracial unions. But the multiracial children of these relationships were perceived as a threat to the purity of the white race, and anti-miscegenation laws were promptly passed in the 1660s to preserve distinct racial categories.

Further means of legitimizing the construct of race in the United States emerged in the late nineteenth and early twentieth centuries through what was known as racial science or scientific racism. These ideologies were eventually disproven; however, at the time of their rise, they occupied a critical role in American scholarship's understanding and depiction of human beings. Racial sciences gained additional credibility due to the illustrious reputations of scholars who conceptualized the field, such as Louis Agassiz, a leading American School of Ethnology member from Harvard University.

Eurocentric frameworks brought to the United States through colonial ties led to the emergence of a binary racial project wherein ‘blackness’ and ‘whiteness’ are presented as opposite ends of a racial spectrum with no categories in between. This limitation leads multiracial individuals to be perceived in relation to either extreme of the spectrum, and not as occupying the space between black and white, despite how they personally identify. This phenomenon can be further explained through the history of the one-drop rule, a means of racial categorization which emerged during the Jim Crow era in the American South. In effect, the one-drop rule upheld that Americans with any African heritage would be considered fully black. This policy barred multiracial descendants of black Americans from accessing the higher social statuses of their white family members, while also refusing to acknowledge the existence of multiracial identities. Remnants of the one-drop rule are still evident today as multiracial Americans of African heritage are still often perceived as black instead of multiracial.

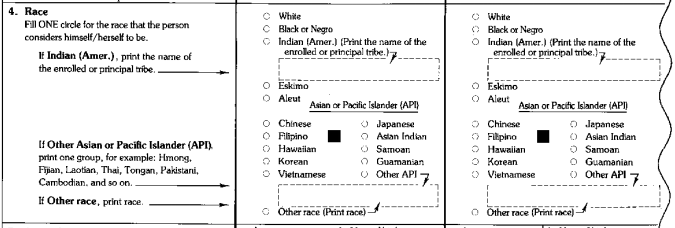
U.S. Census Bureau survey section on race from 1990. Participants were only allowed to indicate one race from a limited set of options.

The Civil Rights Movement in the 1960s inspired discourse, dramatically changing the perception of multiracial identities in the United States. In 1967, the Supreme Court Case Loving v. Virginia repealed all remaining anti-miscegenation laws, deeming these practices unconstitutional. As a result, the 1970s saw a rise in biracial marriages, a trend still evident decades later.

In the 2000 U.S. Census, Americans could self-identify as more than one racial group, marking the first time that the United States legally recognized multiracial identities. Calculations based on the U.S. Census Bureau’s 2005-2015 American Community Surveys and 2000 decennial census show that the number of individuals identifying as more than one race rose by 106 percent between 2000 and 2015. Furthermore, a 2018 report from the U.S. Census Bureau projects that, if trends continue, the multiracial population will triple in size by 2060.

With the rise of multiracial identities in the United States, multiracialism has become an increasingly popular framework. Scholars such as Lauren D. Davenport, a political science professor from Stanford University, are exploring how the increasing number of Americans self-identifying as multiracial has the potential to impact political affiliations and minority solidarity. Davenport stresses how this has raised serious concerns in the African American community, as multiracial individuals with black heritage have been instrumental in promoting the political agendas of the black community. The main concern is that growing solidarity among the multiracial community will lead to other minority groups losing impassioned support from a critical group of allies. In fact, this is one of the reasons why the National Association for the Advancement of Colored People (NAACP) and the National Urban League saw the push for a multiracial category on the U.S. Census in 1990 as a threat to black solidarity.

Additionally, multiracialism has been used to frame the expansion of the multiracial population as evidence of America becoming a post-racial democracy. The merging of races has been interpreted as evidence of incremental steps toward racial equality and social progress; however, mixing these identities has been occurring for centuries, and the social benefits of multiracialism have not been well researched or supported.

== See also ==
- Multiculturalism
- Biracial
- Colorism
- Racism
- Race in America
- Race in Brazil
- Mestizo
- Filipino Mestizo
- Creole
- Hapa
- Zhonghua minzu
