= Benjamin Fain =

Israeli physicist (1930–2013)

Benjamin Fain Вениамин Файн
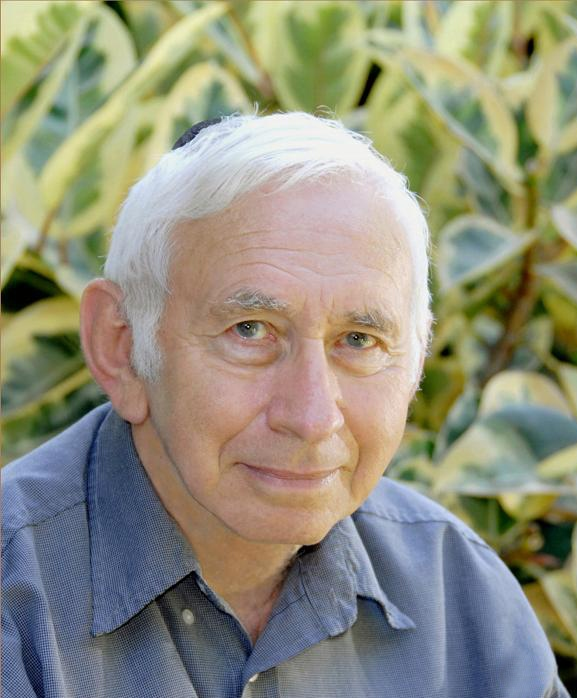
- Born: February 17, 1930; Kyiv, Ukraine, USSR
- Died: April 15, 2013 (aged 83)
- Education: Gorky University
- Occupations: Physicist, dissident, refusenik, author
- Scientific career
- Fields: Physics
- Workplaces: Tel Aviv University

Benjamin Fain (Russian: Вениамин Моисеевич Файн, Hebrew: בנימין פיין; February 17, 1930 – April 15, 2013) was an Israeli physicist, professor-emeritus, and former refusenik.

== Biography ==
Fain was born to a Jewish family in Kyiv. His father was a mathematician. He instilled in the child a love for science as well as a strong national sentiment.

Benjamin Fain was named after his grandfather, who was murdered in the Proskurov pogrom. During the Second World War the family was evacuated and changed location several times. After the end of the war the family stayed in Dushanbe, where Fain graduated from school. He became a student in the Moscow Institute of Energetics. During his first year in Moscow he visited synagogue and attempted to learn the Hebrew and Yiddish languages. Fain was strongly impressed by the historical visit of the first Israeli ambassador to USSR, Golda Meir. Fain managed to transfer in 1950 to the Faculty of physics in Gorky University. He graduated there summa cum laude. His instructor was future Nobel Prize winner Vitaly Ginzburg.

== Academic career ==
Fain successfully started his scientific career, and already in 1965 became a professor in his alma mater. He wrote several scientific books translated into English and German. In 1966 he moved to Moscow and started successful work in the Institute of Solid State Physics in Chernogolovka.

Fain on the right side, Andrei Sakharov — on the left side. Unofficial seminar of scientists-refuseniks, April 1977

Starting from 1972 Fain gradually started to participate in a Zionist movement. He took part in refusenik scientific seminar, and also in Samizdat. He applied for exit visa to Israel in 1974 and became a refusenik. He also became unemployed after dismissal from his work on political grounds.

== Sociological research of Soviet Jewry ==
In 1976 Fain initiated a sociological research on Soviet Jewry. An attempt to organize an international symposium on the subject was foiled by the KGB, which closely watched all his steps from then on. At the same period Fain gradually started practicing Judaism. After several arrests, searches, interrogations and a hunger strike Fain finally arrived in Israel in 1977.

Fain published his study on Jewish identity of Soviet Jews with the American sociologist Mervin Verbit. Fain and Verbit published their findings in 1984 through the Jerusalem Center for Public Affairs.

== In Israel ==
He continued to struggle to improve the life of Soviet Jews and also continued his scientific work in Tel Aviv University in the fields of quantum electronics, lasers and condensed matter.

Starting from 1998 his field of interest moved to the philosophy of science and Judaism and the interrelation between them. After retirement Fain wrote his first philosophic book in Hebrew: "Creation Ex Nihilo", where he analyzes the relationship between religion and science. It was published in Hebrew as well as in English and Russian translations. The Russian version of the book also has an autobiographic part to it.

In 2008 Fain completed another book in Hebrew: "Law and Providence". It was published in 2011 in English by Urim Publications. In January 2011 Fain's third book Hebrew: «דלות הכפירה» («Dalut Ha'kfira» («The Poverty of Secularism») was published by Hebrew: Mosad Ha'rav Kook.

== Children ==
Fain is the father of two sons and one daughter.

== Bibliography ==
- "Creation Ex Nihilo : Thoughts on Science, Divine Providence, Free Will, and Faith in the Perspective of My Own Experiences", Benjamin Fain
- "Laws of Nature and the Providence", Benjamin Fain (in print)
- "Quantum Electronics" by Benjamin Fain and Ya. I. Khanin, The MIT Press (15 September 1969), in English, ISBN 0-262-06030-2, ISBN 978-0-262-06030-1
