= Mervin F. Verbit =

American sociologist (born 1936)

- Born: November 24, 1936 (age 89); Philadelphia, Pennsylvania, U.S.
- Education: University of Pennsylvania; Columbia University
- Scientific career
- Fields: Sociology, sociology of religion
- Workplaces: Brooklyn College, Touro College

Mervin Feldman Verbit (born November 24, 1936) is an American sociologist whose work focuses on sociology of religion, American Jews and the American Jewish community. He is currently the chair of the Sociology Department at Touro College.

== Academic background ==
Verbit was born in Philadelphia in 1936. He graduated from the University of Pennsylvania where he received his B.A. and M.A. Verbit received his Ph.D. from Columbia University. His dissertation studied the religious attitudes of Jewish college students. Verbit was a full-time professor of sociology at Brooklyn College and has been visiting professor at several institutions, among them Bar Ilan University, Hebrew University, Tel Aviv University, Yeshiva University, and Jewish Theological Seminary. Verbit was appointed deputy chair of Touro College's Sociology Department in 2006, and was later appointed as the department chair.

Other areas of academic involvement include serving as Chairman of the Editorial Board of the Contemporary Jewry journal (1977-1980), as a contributing editor for Review of Religious Research (1977-1979), and as a member of the Wilstein Institute for Jewish Policy Studies' Advisory Board (1990-199?).

== Measures of religiosity ==
Verbit was among the sociologists of religion to explore the theoretical analysis of the sociological dimensions of religiosity. His contribution includes measuring religiosity through six different "components" (similar to Charles Glock's five-dimensional approach (Glock, 1972: 39)), and the individual's behaviour vis-à-vis each one of these components has a number of "dimensions", making it a twenty-four-dimensional measure of religiosity.

=== The twenty-four-dimensional religiosity measure ===
Verbit's six components of religiosity are:

- ritual
- doctrine
- emotion
- knowledge
- ethics
- community

Verbit's four dimensions for measuring the above six components are:

- content, the elements of one's religious repertoire.
- frequency, the 'amount' of involvement of a person in religious behaviors and practices.
- intensity, the degree of determination or consistency in relation to one’s position towards religion.
- centrality, the importance that a person attributes to religious tenets, rituals and sentiments.

Verbit theorized that each of the six components could be measured along the four dimensions (e.g. ritual is measured by ritual content, ritual frequency, ritual intensity, ritual centrality).

24 Measure scale of religiosity		Dimensions of religiosity			
24 Measure scale of religiosity		Content	Frequency	Intensity	Centrality
Components of religiosity	Ritual	Ritual content	Ritual frequency	Ritual intensity	Ritual centrality
Components of religiosity	Doctrine	Doctrine content	Doctrine frequency	Doctrine intensity	Doctrine centrality
Components of religiosity	Emotion	Emotion content	Emotion frequency	Emotion intensity	Emotion centrality
Components of religiosity	Knowledge	Knowledge content	Knowledge frequency	Knowledge intensity	Knowledge centrality
Components of religiosity	Ethics	Ethics content	Ethics frequency	Ethics intensity	Ethics centrality
Components of religiosity	Community	Community content	Community frequency	Community intensity	Community centrality

== Involvement in Jewish academic organizations ==
Mervin Verbit served as the first president of the Association for the Social Scientific Study of Jewry (ASSJ), a cross-disciplinary organization of individuals whose research concerns the Jewish people throughout the world. He was president of the ASSJ from 1971 to 1973.

Verbit is currently a fellow at the Jerusalem Center for Public Affairs, a Jerusalem-based institute for Jewish policy research.

Verbit served on Technical Advisory Committee for the National Jewish Population Study (NJPS) 2000-2001 national survey of American Jews.

Verbit has organized two academic conferences for university faculty to familiarize themselves with topics relating to Israel.

== Sociological research on Soviet Jewry ==
In 1976, Benjamin Fain initiated a sociological study on Soviet Jewry. After emigrating to Israel in 1977, Fain and Verbit published the study on the Jewish identity of Soviet Jews. The study was published in 1984, through the Jerusalem Center for Public Affairs. The report recounts the extraordinary faithfulness of Soviet Jews to the surviving remnants of Judaism under the rule of the Soviet Union.

=== Study findings ===
The study used data gathered from a 1976 survey organized by Fain. The respondents were some 1,200 Soviet Jews who had not taken any steps to try to leave the country. Fifty three percent of the respondents reported to respect religion though they did not believe, compared with thirty five percent who entertained various negative positions on religion. Eleven percent had more positive attitudes towards religion.

== Family ==
Verbit's daughter, Shira Richman, is a behavior therapy consultant, and the author of two books on autism in children; Raising a Child with Autism and Encouraging Appropriate Behavior for Children on the Autism Spectrum.

== Publications ==
- Verbit, M. F. (2012). "American Jews: More right than left on the peace process". Jewish Political Studies Review, 24(1), 45-58.
- Verbit, M. F. (2002). "A research agenda for American Jewry". Contemporary Jewry, 23(1), 1-13.
- Verbit, M. F. (1996). [Review of the book A Jewish quest for religious meaning, by N. E. Frimer]. Tradition, 30(3), 86-92.
- Ernest Krausz, & Verbit, M. F. (1995). "Interuniversity Fellowship Program (with the Overseas Program of the Council for Higher Education)". In M. Davis (Ed.), Teaching Jewish civilization: A global approach to higher education. NYU Press.
- Verbit, M. F. (1994). "Intermarriage in the United States". In G. Wigoder (Ed.), Encyclopaedia Judaica Decennial Book (1983-1992, pp. 57–65). Jerusalem: Keter Publishing House.
- Verbit, M. F. (1992). "Content and company". In M. Mor (Ed.), Jewish assimilation, acculturation, and accommodation (pp. 246–261). Omaha, NE: Creighton University Press.
- Verbit, M. F. (1992). "Images of the movements: Perceptions of American Jewish university students". In M. Mor (Ed.), Jewish Sects, Religious Movements, and Political Parties (pp. 287–300). Omaha, NE: Creighton University Press.
- Verbit, M. F. (1992). "Judaism in the 21st century". In M. Mor (Ed.), Jewish assimilation, acculturation, and accommodation (pp. 304–312). Omaha, NE: Creighton University Press.
- Verbit, M. F. (1990). "Is the morality of political communities the same as the morality of individuals: Yes or no". In D. J. Elazar (Ed.), Morality and power: Contemporary Jewish views (pp. 129–133). Lanham, MD: University Press of America.
- Verbit, M. F. (1989). "Children of the movement". In U. O. Schmelz & S. D. Pergola, Papers in Jewish demography, 1985 (pp. 345–356). Jerusalem, Israel: Hebrew University of Jerusalem.
- Verbit, M. F. (1987). Dor L'dor: Continuity Through Commitment and Knowledge. Council of Jewish Federations.
- Verbit, M. (1985). "Children of the movements: Differences among American Jewish university students raised in Orthodox, Conservative and Reform Homes". Papers in Jewish demography. Jerusalem.
- Verbit, M. F. (1985). Sociology of the American Jewish Community. Contemporary Jewish Civilization: Selected Syllabi, 227.
- Verbit, M. F. (ed.) (1985). World register of university studies in Jewish civilization: inventory of holdings (Vol. 1). Markus Wiener Publishers.
- Fain, B., & Verbit, M. F. (1984). Jewishness in the Soviet Union. Israel: Jerusalem Center for Public Affairs.
- Fain, B., & Verbit, M. F. (1984). Jewishness in the Soviet Union: Report of an empirical survey. Jerusalem, Israel: Jerusalem Center for Public Affairs.
- Verbit, M. R. (1983). "Intermarriage in the United States". Encyclopaedia Judaica Decennial Book, 1992, 56-64.
- Verbit, M. (1983). "Jewish Identity and the Israel‐Diaspora Dialogue". In Forum (Vol. 48, pp. 63–74).
- Verbit, M. F. (1983). "Which Jews Want Children? Correlates of Desired Fertility Among American Jewish University Students". In Papers in Jewish demography, 1981: proceedings of the demographic sessions held at the 8th World Congress of Jewish Studies, Jerusalem, August 1981 (No. 16, p. 269). Institute of Contemporary Jewry, Hebrew University of Jerusalem.
- Verbit, M. F. (1981). "The political character of Judaism and Islam: Some comparisons". In M. Curtis, Religion and politics in the Middle East (pp. 69–76). Boulder, CO: Westview Press.
- Nisan, M., Aviad, J. O. D., & Verbit, M. F. (1980). Gush Emunim, Shalom Achshav, and Israel's Future. Jerusalem Center for Public Affairs.
- Verbit, M. F. (1978). "Intermarriage and the needs of a viable Jewish community". In S. Zimmerman & B. S. Trainin, The threat of mixed marriage: A response. New York, NY: Federation of Jewish Philanthropies of New York.
- Verbit, M. F. (1972). "The Jew on the American Scene". NCJW Journal. Volume 34, Issue 2. National Council of Jewish Women.
- Verbit, M. F. (1971). Characteristics of a Jewish Community: The Demographic and Judaic Profiles of the Jews in the Area Served by the Jewish Federation of North Jersey. Jewish Federation of North Jersey.
- Verbit, M. F. (1971). "Structural Conditions of Jewish Continuity in America". Journal of Jewish Communal Service. Jewish Communal Service Association of North America (JCSA), National Conference of Jewish Communal Service. pp. 10–22.
- Verbit, M. F. (1970). "The components and dimensions of religious behavior: Toward a reconceptualization of religiosity". American mosaic, 24, 39.
- Verbit, M. F. (1968). Referents for religion among Jewish college students (Doctoral dissertation, Columbia University.).
