= Chaim Rapoport =

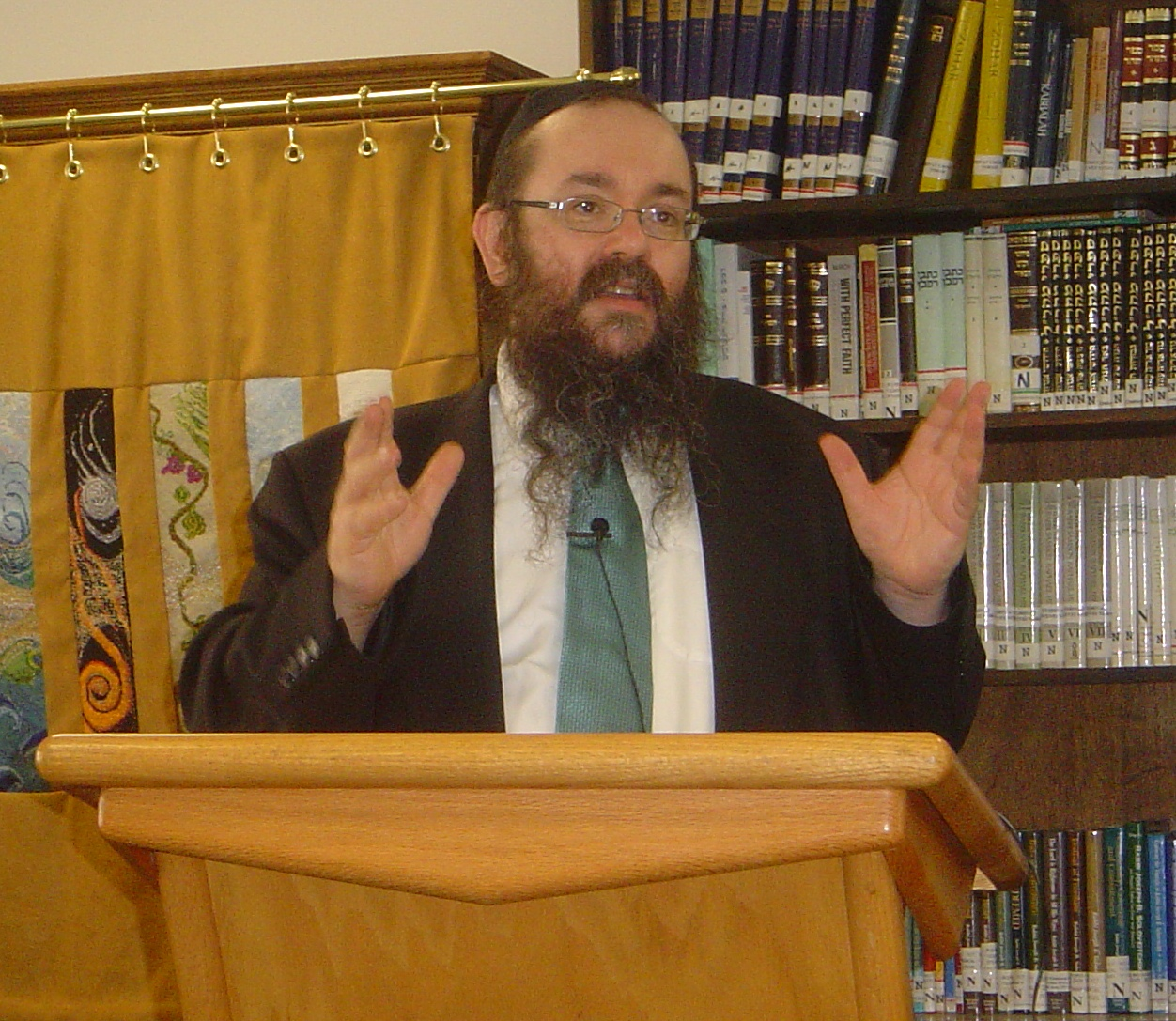
Rabbi Rapoport speaking

Rabbi Chaim Rapoport (b. Manchester, England, 1963) is an author, educator, lecturer and Judaic scholar. He lectures in London and around the world on topics pertaining to Jewish life and law and is the author of several books and articles.

== Early life and education ==
Rapoport was born and raised in Manchester, England. After his schooling, Rapoport attended the Yeshivot of Manchester, Gateshead, Torat Emet in Jerusalem and the central Lubavitch Yeshivah in New York. After receiving his Rabbinic diplomas (semichah) and his marriage to Rachel Clara (née Elyovics) from Antwerp, Belgium, in 1984 he continued his studies in the United States.

In 1987 Rapoport and his wife joined the community Kollel in Melbourne, Australia, where, in addition to his post graduate studies, he officiated and lectured in several communities, including Launceston in Tasmania.

== Career ==
In 1989, Rapoport took up position as head of the Lubavitch Kollel in Leeds UK, a position which he occupied until the end of 1994. In the years 1994 – 1997 Rapoport served as the Rabbi of the Birmingham Central Synagogue and the Head of the Birmingham Rabbinic Board.

In September 1997 Rapoport was appointed as Rabbi to the Ilford Synagogue, Beehive Lane. In February 2005, Rapoport and the synagogue's full-time Chazan Avrom Levin were dismissed, amid controversy about the United Synagogue withdrawing funding from its smaller Jewish communities. In a statement made by the United Synagogue, they explained that the reason behind the decision was "the dire financial position of the community".

In 1998 Rapoport was appointed as a member of the Chief Rabbi's Cabinet and Advisor to the Chief Rabbi, Jonathan Sacks, on matters of Jewish Medical Ethics and served in this position until the retirement of Rabbi Sacks in 2013. In this capacity, he served as the Chief Rabbi's spokesperson to the media and as an intermediary between himself and the British medical establishment and several other prominent organisations. During this period Rapoport gave a regular lecture to the United Synagogue Rabbinate at the London School of Jewish Studies.

In 2012 the Jewish Chronicle reported that Rapoport visits Yeshivat Chovevei Torah for a week every year to give classes there.

Rapoport was a 2015 presenter at Limmud New York, where he spoke on a Friday night on the topic of: 'Halacha: Science or Art?'

== Writings on homosexuality ==
Rapoport has written about homosexuality from an Orthodox perspective. His book, Judaism and Homosexuality: An Authentic Orthodox View (Vallentine Mitchell, 2004), was prefaced by Dayan Berel Berkowitz, a senior Judge of the Beth Din of the Federation of Synagogues, where he describes it as "the first meaningful attempt to articulate a strictly orthodox perspective on the question of Homosexuality". The book's foreword was written by the then Chief Rabbi, Jonathan Sacks who described Rapoport as "a courageous figure who has written on a difficult subject that many would rather avoid". The book stakes out a position on Homosexuality and Judaism designed "to mitigate the painful consequences of Orthodoxy's uncompromising rejection of homosexuality.", exploring the intersection between halakhah and homosexuality.

An article by Rapoport in which he further elaborated his views on this topic, was published by Hakira- The Flatbush Journal of Jewish Law & Thought, in 2012.

== Controversies ==
In 2007 Rapoport wrote an open letter to the Yated Ne'eman newspaper calling on the editor to condemn Yeshiva University as a heretical institution. However, in a lecture at Yeshiva University on 2 December 2016, Rapoport claimed that his article was in fact meant as satire.

In 2013, Rapoport gave a positive character reference for building businessman Menachem Mendel Levy during Levy's trial for sex offences that culminated in the latter's 2013 conviction and jailing on two counts of indecently assaulting a young girl. Specifically, he called him the "embodiment of repentance". Regarding Rapoport's comments to the court, victim Yehudis Goldsobel said: "I was mortified. I was embarrassed to be Jewish. It was the last straw for me."

== Works ==
- Dinei U'Minhagei Rosh Chodesh (Kehot Publication Society, 1993)
- Kappei Chayim on Birkas Kohanim (privately published, 1994)
- The Messiah Problem: Berger, the Angel and the Scandal of Reckless Indiscrimination (Ilford 2002)
- Judaism and Homosexuality: An Authentic Orthodox View (Vallentine Mitchell, 2004)
- Birkat HaChamah (Kehot Publication Society, 2008)
- The Afterlife of Scholarship: A Critical Review of 'The Rebbe' by Samuel Heilman and Menachem Friedman (Oporto Press, 2011) ISBN 978-0-615-53897-6
