= Arnold Dashefsky =

American sociologist (born 1942)

- Born: 1942 (age 83–84)
- Scientific career
- Fields: Sociology
- Workplaces: University of Connecticut

Arnold Dashefsky, is a professor at the University of Connecticut who has written several books on topics relating to Jewish Studies. Dashefsky is an ex-officio member of the oversight committee at the North American Jewish Data Bank. He was previously a director.
