= Contemporary Jewry =

- Discipline: Sociology, social sciences
- Language: English
- Edited by: Harriet Hartman

Publication details
- Former names: Jewish Sociology and Social Research
- History: 1977-present
- Publisher: Springer, Association for the Social Scientific Study of Jewry (United States)
- Frequency: Triannual

Standard abbreviations
- ISO 4: Contemp. Jew.

Indexing
- ISSN: 0147-1694
- OCLC no.: 61124234

Contemporary Jewry is a peer-reviewed academic journal published by the Association for the Social Scientific Study of Jewry since 1977.

The journal mostly publishes articles on the subject of the sociology of Jewry, however, articles on Jews and Judaism based on other social sciences as well as history are published as well.

== History ==
Contemporary Jewry was initially published semiannually from 1977 to 1985. From 1986 to 2008, the journal published annually. Since 2009, the journal has published three issues per year. The publication was originally titled Jewish Sociology and Social Research.
