= Werner J. Cahnman =

Werner Jacob Cahnman
- Born: September 30, 1902; Munich, Germany
- Died: September 27, 1980 (aged 77); Forest Hills, Queens, New York, U.S.
- Education: Friedrich Wilhelm University of Berlin; Ludwig-Maximilians-Universität München
- Spouse: Gisella Levi (m. 19??) (1910–2003)
- Scientific career
- Fields: Sociology
- Workplaces: Rutgers University
- Doctoral advisor: Otto von Zwiedineck-Südenhorst

Werner Jacob Cahnman (also Cahnmann; September 30, 1902 – September 27, 1980) was a German Jewish refugee and sociologist known for his work on the sociology of Jews and for his involvement with Jewish cultural organizations and community affairs.

== Biography ==
Werner Cahnman was born in Munich, Germany, the first son of Sigwart Cahnmann, a chemical manufacturer and president of the B'nai B'rith lodge in Munich, and Hedwig Schülein. His father's family was from the rural village of Rheinbischofsheim, while his maternal family belonged to the haute bourgeoisie of Munich and Nuremberg. He was one of six children with three sisters and two brothers. Growing up in Munich, the family home became a gathering place for notables of various political and religious viewpoints. Cahnman studied law and political science at the Ludwig-Maximilians-Universität München and the Friedrich Wilhelm University of Berlin, receiving his doctorate in sociology in 1927 under Otto von Zwiedineck-Südenhorst.

Cahnman published many papers, journal articles, and book reviews in the decade following his graduation. During this time, he was a research associate at Association of German Chambers of Industry and Commerce in Berlin and at the Kiel Institute for the World Economy, became a lecturer at the Jewish Adult Education Center (Jüdisches Lehrhaus) in Munich. From 1930 to 1934, he served as Syndikus, or legal counsel, for the Bavarian regional Centralverein deutscher Staatsbuerger juedischen Glaubens (Central Association of German Citizens of Jewish Faith).

In 1938, Cahnman went to his parents' home and encountered SS officers who had arrived to arrest his father. He volunteered to take his father's place and was sent to the Dachau concentration camp. He later wrote of his experience and observations during his time in Dachau. Through the intervention of his academic mentor Karl Haushofer, he was released on the condition that he emigrate from Germany. He emigrated in 1939 via England to the United States, arriving in 1940. His mother was deported to Piaski in 1942, where she became a victim of the Holocaust. His sisters and brothers were able to emigrate.

During World War II, he was involved in overseas broadcasting for the Voice of America. He later served as the U.S. chair for the International Dachau Committee and was active in fundraising initiatives to establish an international memorial at the former concentration camp site. Cahnman also chaired the Rashi Association, which was dedicated to the preservation of Jewish cultural monuments in Europe, worked as a consultant to the Federation of Jewish Philanthropies and was a leader in initiatives aimed at fostering understanding among racial minorities.

== Career ==
Cahnman produced numerous studies in the field of social prejudice. His work was influenced by Ferdinand Tönnies, Max Weber—whose typological approach he adopted—and George Herbert Mead. His principal areas of research were the sociology of Jews, historical sociology, geopolitics, and the history of the social sciences. He played a key role in founding the Historical Sociology Section of the American Sociological Association and served as its chair.

After immigrating to the United States, Cahnman was initially affiliated with the University of Chicago as a visiting doctoral scholar and later held teaching positions in sociology at Fisk University in Nashville, Atlanta University, and other institutions. From 1961 until his retirement, he was a professor of sociology at Rutgers University. After the Second World War he also served as a visiting professor at the Ludwig-Maximilians-Universität München, where he was emerited in 1968, returning again in 1973. He served on the editorial board of the journal The Reconstructionist for many years, contributing articles till the end of his life. He was also employed for a period as a scientific analyst by the U.S. Department of State.

== Selected publications ==
- 1931: Der ökonomische Pessimismus und das Ricardosche System
- 1943: "The Mediterranean and Caribbean Regions", in Social Forces
- 1943: "Concepts of Geopolitics", American Sociological Review, Vol. 8, No. 1 (Feb., 1943), pp. 55–59.
- 1952: "The Cultural Consciousness of Jewish Youth", in Jewish Social Studies
- 1959: How Cities Grew: The Historical Sociology of Cities. with Jean Louis Leopold Comhaire.
- 1963: "The Life of Clementine Kraemer", New York 1963 & LBI Year Book 9 London 1964 (267–292)
- 1963: (Ed.) Intermarriage and Jewish Life
- 1964 (with Alvin Boskoff): Sociology and History: Theory and Research
- 1969: "The Three Regions of German-Jewish History", in Jubilee. Volume dedicated to Curt C. Silberman
- 1971 (with Rudolf Heberle): Ferdinand Toennies on Sociology: Pure, Applied and Empirical
- 1973: Ferdinand Toennies: A New Evaluation
- 1974: "Pariahs, Strangers and Court Jews", in American Sociological Review
- 1974: "Friedrich Wilhelm Schelling über die Judenemanzipation", in: Zeitschrift für Bayerische Landesgeschichte
- 1981: "Tönnies und die Theorie des sozialen Wandels. Eine Rekonstruktion", in: L. Clausen/F. U. Pappi (Ed.), Ankunft bei Tönnies, Kiel: Mühlau
- 1988: (posthum) German Jewry Its History and Sociology: Selected Essays of Werner J. Cahnman, Eds. Joseph B. Maier, Judith Marcus and Zoltan Tarr Transaction Publ., New Brunswick & Oxford 1989, ISBN 0-88738-253-3
- 1994: (posthum) "Weber and Toennies: Comparative Sociology in Historical Perspective". Eds. Joseph B. Maier, Zoltan Tarr and Judith T. Marcus
- 2004: (posthum) Jews and Gentiles: A Historical Sociology of Their Relations, Eds. Judith T. Marcus and Zoltan Tarr, Routledge, New Brunswick, USA
- 2007 (posthum): Social Issues, Geopolitics, and Judaica, Eds. Judith T. Marcus and Zoltan Tarr, Routledge, New Brunswick, USA & London

== Sources ==
- Alvin Boskoff: Cahnman, Werner J. In: Michael Berenbaum, Fred Skolnik (Ed.): Encyclopaedia Judaica. Band 4, 2. Auflage, Macmillan Reference, Detroit 2007, S. 338–339.
- Rudolf Heberle: Werner J. Cahnman †. In: Zeitschrift für Soziologie 10 (1981) 1, S. 109–110.
- J. Maier: Cahnmann, Werner Jacob. In: Wilhelm Bernsdorf / Horst Knospe (Ed.): Internationales Soziologenlexikon, Bd. 2, Enke, Stuttgart ² 1984, S. 116 f.
- Werner Röder; Herbert A. Strauss (Ed.): International Biographical Dictionary of Central European Emigrés 1933–1945. Band 2,1. München : Saur, 1983, ISBN 3-598-10089-2, S. 178
- Cahnman, Werner Jacob. In: Lexikon deutsch-jüdischer Autoren. Band 4: Brech–Carle. Ed. vom Archiv Bibliographia Judaica. Saur, München 1996, ISBN 3-598-22684-5, S. 394–398.
