= Bicultural identity =

Condition of being oneself

Bicultural identity is the condition of being oneself regarding the combination of two cultures. The term can also be defined as biculturalism, which is the presence of two different cultures in the same country or region. As a general term, culture involves the behaviors and belief characteristics of a particular social, ethnic, or age group. Within culture, we have cultural effects, which are the shared behaviors and customs we learn from the institutions around us. An example of a cultural effect would be how an individual's personality is strongly influenced by the biological and social norms he is exposed to. Another cultural effect would be that in some societies it would be more acceptable to dress or act in a certain way.

In regards to bicultural identity, an individual may face conflict assimilating into both cultures or finding a balance between both. An individual may face challenges assimilating into the whole, collective culture. Similarly, an individual may face difficulty balancing their identity within themselves due to the influence of both of their cultures. Being an individual with identity plurality can be hard mentally and emotionally. The different levels of biculturalism can be defined through the way people are able to simultaneously manage their two selves. The more they alternate between them, the more cognitive complexity they face, since they avoid cultural duality and do not practice handling both cultures at the same time. It is through identity integration that they will be able to solve the problem and alleviate the tolls that come with identity plurality. Bicultural identity also may have positive effects on the individual, in terms of the additional knowledge they acquire from belonging to more than one culture. Furthermore, with the growing number of racial minorities in American society, individuals that identify with more than one culture may have more linguistic ability.

== Biculturalism and personality ==
Culture affects the personality of an individual because the individual may react in a way that is reflective of the knowledge one acquires from one or more culture(s). Problems may arise when ideals in one culture are not connected to another culture, which may cause generalizations about personality. Personality is shaped by both cultures and thus generalizations should not be made based on one single culture. One's culture also influences one's hormonal changes, one's interaction with violence and one's family values. For example, Hispanic culture often requires older children to take care and/or help raise younger siblings, while mainstream American culture interprets parents as the sole caregivers. Another example of this difference would be religious preference and or practice. Cultures other than the American culture may often identify more with certain religions and are often more in tune with their religious beliefs.

== Measuring bicultural identity ==
=== Bicultural Identity Integration ===
One construct to measure bicultural identity is the Bicultural Identity Integration (BII) construct. It is a relatively new construct and was proposed in 2002 by Benet-Martínez, Leu, Lee & Morris. The BII looks at how the bicultural individual perceives his bicultural identities and whether they are compatible or oppositional. It also seeks to identify the big five aspects of an individual's personality, including aspects such as sociability, activity and emotionality. The BII seeks to find whether an individual has a cultural distance or conflict within one's cultures, which in turn helps indicate how biculturally competent we are.

Low BII bicultural individuals have difficulties in incorporating both cultures into a cohesive identity and tend to see both cultures as highly dissimilar. Bicultural individuals with high BII on the other hand, see their identities as complementary and themselves as part of a “third” culture, which integrates elements from both their cultures. According to Margaret Mead, a cultural anthropologist, individuals respond in a more stable fashion when their cultural contexts are understood. Researchers wanted to examine how these differences could relate to other factors and the results are insightful. BII is significantly associated with the psychological and social adjustments of the bicultural. Low BII bicultural individuals are found to have inferior bilingual proficiency, experience more anxiety, depression and are more neurotic and less open than bicultural individuals with high BII. More importantly, low BII bicultural individuals are not chameleon-like. They resist the frame switching and are more likely to respond in ways inconsistent with the cultural cues. In other words, when low BII Chinese-Americans are presented with American cues, unlike high BII bicultural individuals, they would not behave like Americans but instead, more like a Chinese. However, the identity struggle for bicultural individuals can be made less arduous. Like other personality traits, BII is malleable to contextual factors. BII can be increased by asking bicultural individuals to recall positive cross-cultural exchanges or like in another study, make high-level construals. These findings can be useful in for example, helping immigrants to cope with their new environment.

== Bicultural identity and language ==
Language is an essential aspect of any culture. Individuals are able to maintain key aspects of their culture by maintaining their culture's language. Language is important because it is an oral form of how people interact with other people within a society. Language reinforces the ties among the people who speak the same language, and thus encourages cultural bonding. Thus, by preserving the language within both of one's cultures, one can maintain one's integration within each culture. However, this can result in a difficulty in integrating one's cultures if each has a distinct, different language as it can prevent outsiders from understanding that particular culture.

=== Cultural frame switching ===
The concept of cultural frame switching (CFS) or double consciousness made popular by W.E.B. Du Bois addresses how an individual switches between cultural frames or systems in response to their environment. The presence of culture-specific peers can elicit culture-specific values. CFS can be used to describe the switching of different language use depending on the context. Thus, CFS can be connected to cultural accommodation, which is seen when bilinguals respond to situations with the language that applies best to the situation present.

It is evident that language can have an effect on an individual's thinking process. This is because the language itself primes the individual's cultural values, cognitive style, attitudes and memory, which in turn affect behavior. For example, researchers randomly assigned participants in India to complete a work task in English or Hindi. Participants received either extra pay for working harder or a social norm message about how hard other people tended to work. The extra pay was more motivating in English than in Hindi, which mirrors results from when the researchers tested people in the US and UK.

== Cultural perspectives ==
=== African American culture ===
African American culture is also known as black culture in the United States and the identity of African American culture is rooted in the historical experience of the African American people. It is rooted in Africa, and is a blend of sub-Saharan African and Sahelean cultures. Due to aspects of African American culture that were accentuated by the slavery period, African American culture is dynamic. Within the African American culture, race or physical differences led to mass murder, and violence against racial groups. These occurrences may affect an individual's perception of their African American culture. In America, Black and White differences are the most significant groupings largely because of American history. The US was founded on the principle of “all men are equal” and yet slavery existed. This is what resulted in the American Dilemma. Thus, due to historical reasons, and because they are often stereotyped, African Americans have difficulty assimilating with their culture and American culture.

=== Asian culture ===
Individuals having origins within the Far East, Southeast Asia or the Indian subcontinent are referred to as Asian under the U.S. Census Bureau. Asians complete 4.8% of the U.S. population alone. Asians have had the highest educational attainment level and median household income of any racial demographic in the USA and attain the highest median personal income overall, as of 2008. Thus, Asian culture is often depicted as the most similar culture to American Culture. Asians often communicate non-verbally and/or indirectly, and often are not as frank or upfront as other cultures in terms of their communication. Asian culture is typically much more group-oriented or holistic and thus the way in which they interpret the world is systematically different from the more individualistic American Culture in terms of thought process and lifestyle. This may make it difficult for Asians in the USA to assimilate easily into American culture.

=== Hispanic culture ===
Hispanics and Latinos have origins in the countries of Latin America and the Iberian Peninsula consisting of Spain and Portugal. Hispanics are very racially diverse. Hispanics often are very religiously oriented and focus on family values and the importance of intergenerational connections. This may cause difficulty in integration with American culture, as the Hispanic community often emphasizes the importance of helping one's family and advancing as a family rather than simply individual success, which is more prominent within American Culture. Similarly, Hispanics may have difficulty associating with American Culture because of the language culture, as most Hispanics can speak Spanish. The ability to speak Spanish is valued greatly within Hispanic culture, as it is greatly used during social gatherings and amongst extended family. The Spanish language is a significant part of Hispanic culture, and because of the vast amount of racial differences within Hispanics, the way in which Spanish is spoken within the different racial groups is often different. This makes it not only difficult to assimilate into American culture but to often assimilate with the different races in Hispanic communities.

=== European culture ===
Europeans in the United States have a different culture from American culture. For example, Irish culture is different from American culture.

== Immigrant experience ==
Immigrants particularly find it difficult to assimilate both their cultural contexts. Immigrants need to reconcile both their current host cultures and their culture of origin, which is where they grew up. Immigrants culturally evolve through a process of adaptation and assimilation. Immigrants are usually influenced by more dominant values that they have learned in their native cultures. Immigrants encounter a major upheaval by moving far away from home and sometimes may never find themselves connected to either culture. Immigrants face many stresses, which can raise their risk for substance abuse and other psychological stressors. Developing a bicultural identity involves blending two cultures together and learning to be competent within their two cultures. Immigrants and children of these individuals may be more at risk for victimization, poverty, and the need for assistance from the government. Immigrant parents for example may struggle to find a balance in their new lives and may be so busy keeping up with the demands that may be less involved in the community and in turn less involved with their child's education.

With immigrants, language barriers may also bring hardship in terms of communication with natives of their less dominant culture. Immigrants may not adapt fully because of the language barriers holding them back from even simple conversation. Acculturation is the process in which a bicultural individual or immigrant adopts the social norms of the mainstream society. The cultural gap between immigrant parents and their children may widen due to acculturation because younger generations find it easier to adapt to the new culture. Family relations may be strained due to this issue. Children of immigrant parents may enjoy more mainstream culture, but may also want to stick to their families’ roots in order to please their caregivers. Immigrants and bicultural families do have more positive roles as well. They have strong commitments to family and have a dream for a better life. This in turns gives families a sense of purpose and connection and makes the family unit stronger. Native customs such as holidays and religious affiliations may also support the family unit and promote unity all around.

== Integration ==
=== Social and workplace interactions ===
Individuals with bicultural identity face issues around stereotype threat. Others may be perceived negatively, or their judgments may in turn alter the way that one behaves in certain situations. For example, with standardized testing, African American students in low-income areas often do worse on a given test due to the expectations for them to do worse. Stereotype threat is so powerful that it may extend on to different areas of life, such as the workplace. It is a multidimensional concept that may affect an individual on many levels. Stereotype threat makes it harder for individuals to integrate successfully with their peers if they feel judged or feel pressures to exceed in certain ways especially if their dual cultural roles may be in conflict with one another. These scenarios are contingent on an individual's success with acculturation strategies.

A bicultural individual's integration into a workplace also depends on the cultural makeup of his or her team. A team can be categorized as culturally homogenous, culturally diverse, or possessing a cultural faultline. A bicultural is more likely to integrate with a team, possessing the skills to form a cultural attachment with homogenous or heterogenous teams by traversing cultural barriers.

=== Family dynamics and integration ===
Caregivers also face a dilemma with their children who have bicultural identities; they want to instill pride in their children, but also must prepare their children for prejudice without making them feel inferior to other cultural groups. For example, African-American parents must socialize their children in such a manner where they will be prepared to face discrimination in society, but they also must preserve their culture in such a way that makes them feel prideful. This dilemma that parents face makes it harder for individuals to feel comfortable within social groups and may minimize the different cultures that individuals surround themselves with. Some individuals can develop a more multicultural outlook and feel confident being around many kinds of people, whereas others may have an issue with this and may stick to their own cultural group.

== Academics and attitudes towards education ==
Academics within individuals with bicultural identity may also be adversely affected in terms of stereotype threat. An individual may lose motivation in a scholastic setting due to the negative expectations placed on them. Attitudes may change within academics if a student feels as though he cannot do well due to societal constraints on his particular culture. Although this may discourage some, specific tests have been made in order to integrate culture within standardized testing.

A system created by Jane Mercer, assumes that test results cannot be distanced from the culture and it focuses on comparisons among people within particular culture groups rather than between culture groups. This system has been applied to intelligence and ability examinations in order to combat the concern of disadvantaged minorities doing poorly due to their incapacity to do as well as their counterparts.

== See also ==
- Culture
  - Cultural assimilation
  - Multiculturalism
  - Cultural psychology
  - Cultural identity
- Identity
  - Identity politics
- Language
  - Bilingualism
  - Plurilingualism
