= Everett Stonequist =

Everett Verner Stonequist (October 5, 1901 – March 26, 1979) was an American sociologist perhaps best known for his 1937 book, The Marginal Man:

"The marginal person is poised in the psychological uncertainty between two (or more) social worlds; reflecting in his soul the discords and harmonies, repulsions and attractions of these worlds...within which membership is implicitly if not explicitly based upon birth or ancestry...and where exclusion removes the individual from a system of group relations." (Stonequist, 1937, p.8)

== Life and work ==
Stonequist was born in Worcester, Mass. and received his A.B. degree in History and Sociology at Clark University. He later studied at Cornell University, Columbia University, and the University of Paris. He received his doctorate in Sociology at the University of Chicago in 1930.

Stonequist taught and conducted research at the University of Hawaii, Duke University, and the University of Missouri. In 1970 Stonequist was honored by Union College in Schenectady for his contributions to the area of race relations. His expertise extended into many areas of research, including the problems of Jews living in primarily Gentile areas, and conditions in Ethiopia, Cyprus, Egypt, Kenya, Jordan, and Israel. In these respects he was clearly as much an anthropologist by inclination as a sociologist.

Stonequist spent most of his academic life teaching at Skidmore College, Saratoga Springs, NY, where he was a well-known figure as a leader on the city's planning commission and housing authority. His work led to the construction of low-cost housing to local residents, and the Stonequist Apartments senior citizen complex. He chaired the Saratoga Springs Housing Authority for almost 30 years and was a technical consultant and planner for the city planning board for 19 years. He was a popular speaker who was widely sought by high school groups and civic, social, and religious organizations.

"He chaired the Skidmore College Department of Sociology from 1930 to 1970. His book, The Marginal Man, called attention to the problems experienced by people making transitions between different cultures, and specifically to pressures felt by minority and ethnic group members in American society. The book is generally credited with laying groundwork for later studies of "marginal" ethnic and occupational groups."

Stonequist's sociological work on marginality builds on that of his chief mentor at Chicago, Robert E. Park. "R. E. Park...[was] Stonequist's teacher and the originator of the term marginal man"

Park's notion that an individual suspended between two cultural realities is marginal results in difficulties in establishing an identity. This work was continued and developed further by Howard S. Becker and others most notably J M Billson, L H Bowker, F M Cox, A F Buono, J B Kamm, J Golden, Mark A Grey, and R A Stebbins.

"One of Park's students [at Chicago], Everett Stonequist, was writing The Marginal Man--A Study in Personality and Culture Conflict (1937). He described the marginal man as "one who is poised in psychological uncertainty between two or more social worlds, reflecting in his soul the discords and harmonies, repulsions and attractions of these worlds." Stonequist's study examines representative types of marginal persons."

In 1980, Dr. Stonequist's family and friends established the Everett V. Stonequist Award, given annually to a graduating senior who has shown outstanding interest and achievement in the study of sociology at Skidmore. The recipient, whose interest and grades in sociology are among the award criteria, is selected by the faculty of the Department of Sociology, Anthropology, and Social Work.

== See also ==
- Chicago school (sociology)
- Marginalization
- Robert L. Park

== Bibliography ==
- The Marginal Man: A Study in Personality and Culture Conflict by Everett V. Stonequist. (New York: Charles Scribner's Sons, 1937; reprint edition: Russell & Russell, 1961)
