= Jewish anti-racism =

Significant numbers of Jewish anti-racism activists have participated in a variety of anti-racist movements, including the American civil rights movement and the South African anti-apartheid movement.

== By country ==
=== France ===
The International League Against Racism and Anti-Semitism was founded in 1927, mostly with the intent to combat antisemitism. The organization has since expanded its mission to include opposition to racism and Islamophobia.

The Jewish collective Tsedek! (Hebrew for "Justice!") describes itself as an anti-racist, anti-Zionist, and decolonial organization.

=== Israel ===
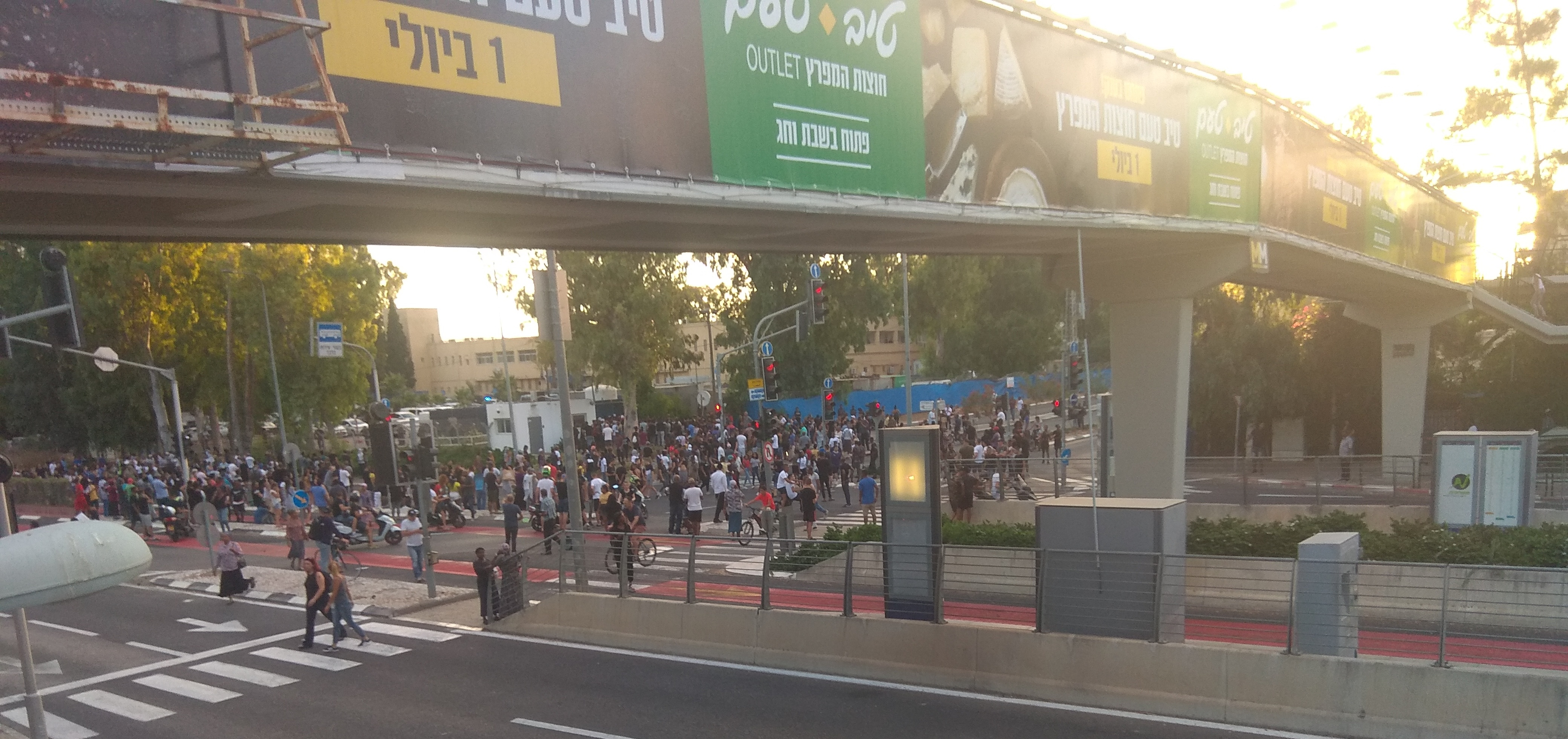
Ethiopian Jews protest in Israel, July 2019.

In 1971, the Black Panthers were founded by Sephardic/Mizrahi Jews in Israel who faced economic dislocation and had been closed off from opportunities by the discriminatory, Ashkenormative leadership of the Alignment. The Black Panthers in Israel would protest police brutality (which had been a major problem during the Wadi Salib riots of 1959), poverty, and would collaborate with the Black Panther Party in the United States. The party would eventually split, however, on the issue of Zionism versus anti-Zionism, with the majority sticking to their Zionist ideals. While some of the Black Panthers, notably Charlie Biton, would join with the Israeli Communist Party to form Hadash, most would move to the right. During the 1973 and 1977 Israeli elections, Menachem Begin and his then newly formed Likud would appeal to a sense of Jewish unity and denounce the left-wing Alignment for their inter-Jewish bigotry and elitism. Begin would win in 1977, mostly riding on the votes of disaffected Sephardic/Mizrahi Jews voters, who have since proven to be a core constituency of Likud, with especially secular Ashkenazi Jews still mostly voting for the center and left. In 1984, Shas would be formed as another Sephardic/Mizrahi party that, while religious in overtone, would appeal to Sephardic/Mizrahi Jews of all stripes, reflecting the right-ward shift of the community.

Ethiopian Jews in Israel have played a central role in opposition to anti-Black racism, as Ethiopian Jews and other Black Jews experience anti-Black racism within Israeli society. The July 2019 Ethiopian Jews protest in Israel was led by Ethiopian Jews and their allies, reacting to anti-Black police brutality in Israel.

=== South Africa ===
South African Jews played a notable role in the anti-apartheid movement in South Africa. A substantial number of white South Africans who were actively involved in the anti-apartheid movement were Jewish. Although the majority of South African Jews and the Jewish establishment in South Africa initially did not condemn the apartheid government, those Jews who participated in the anti-apartheid movement were disproportionately represented in light of the fact that Jews were only 0.3% of the South African population and they were only 2.5% of the white population. More than half of the white South Africans who were charged during the Rivonia Trial were Jewish.

=== United Kingdom ===
In 2021, the Scottish Council of Jewish Communities released their "Jewish Manifesto for Scotland", which advocated for anti-racist education and the provision of culturally sensitive public services, among other policies.

=== United States ===
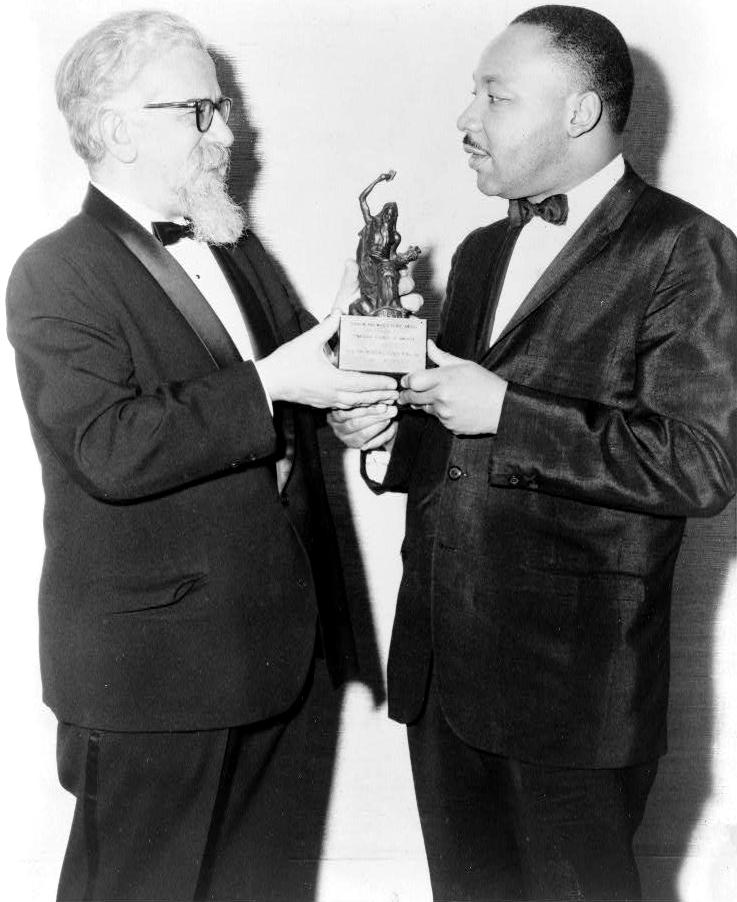
Heschel, left, presenting the Judaism and World Peace Award to Martin Luther King Jr., December 7, 1965

==== Abolitionist movement ====
While some American Jews who lived during the Antebellum Period were in favor of or took no action against slavery, others were actively involved in the abolitionist movement. Jews were noted as members of abolitionist organizations during the early 1830s. An 1853 report by the American and Foreign Anti-Slavery Society noted that some Southern Jews had "refused to have any right of property in man, or even to have any slaves about them" and that the history of antisemitic persecution was a motivating factor for those Jews to support abolitionism.

==== 2020s anti-racist organizing ====
Many American Jews have participated in anti-racist movements during the 2020s, including the George Floyd protests and the Black Lives Matter movement. In 2020, over 600 Jewish organizations representing the majority of American Jews signed onto a letter published in The New York Times on the anniversary of the 1963 March on Washington endorsing the Black Lives Matter movement.

== Jewish pro-Palestinian activism ==
During the 1930s, Jewish Communists in the United States accused the Zionist movement in Mandatory Palestine of perpetuating "Jim-Crowism".

== Jewish Zionist anti-racism ==
Zionist leaders, especially across the United States and in South Africa, were active in the civil rights movement and anti-apartheid movement respectively. These leaders often connected the history of Jewish persecution and segregation to that of the persecution and segregation of African-Americans and Black South Africans.

=== United States ===
Stephen Samuel Wise was a major Reform Jewish rabbi, Zionist activist, and advocate for liberal and progressive causes, most notably the Armenian genocide awareness, the New Deal, anti-fascism, and civil rights. Wise and his American Jewish Congress gained notoriety for their anti-Nazi boycott and their rally in Madison Square Garden in opposition to Adolf Hitler's rise to power in 1933. Wise was also known for his Holocaust awareness activism, being one of the first major figures to be made aware of the genocide after receiving the Riegner telegram. Though he did not live long enough to see civil rights become a major issue in the United States, dying in 1949, Wise was a founding member of the NAACP. Wise was a crucial figure in changing the Reform movement from a mostly non- or anti-Zionist religious movement, denying Jewish peoplehood in favor of Jewish assimilation, into one which embraced Reform Zionism. In particular, Wise's synagogue where he preached, the New York Free Synagogue, became an influential center of Reform Judaism in the United States. With the growing threat of Nazism in Europe, the Reform movement came to view a Jewish refuge from Hitler's persecution to be a necessity for European Jewry, with the Central Conference of American Rabbis overturning the anti-Zionist Pittsburgh Platform in favor of the Columbus Platform in 1937.

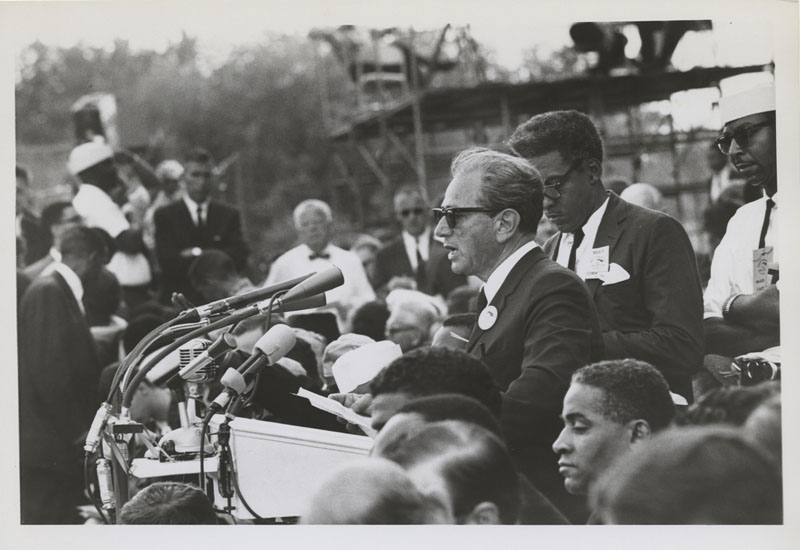
Joachim Prinz, leader of the American Jewish Congress, giving his speech, "The Problem of Silence," immediately before Martin Luther King Jr.'s "I Have a Dream" speech.

One of Wise's successors of the American Jewish Congress would be Joachim Prinz, a German-Jewish refugee, Holocaust survivor, civil rights activist, and avid Zionist. Prinz had become active in the Zionist youth movement Blau-Weiss (Blue and White) during his childhood in 1920s Weimar Germany, to the chagrin of his anti-Zionist, hyper-assimilationist father. As a rabbi, he found that the highly-assimilated Jewish community were incapable of recognizing the existential threat posed by the Nazis. He attempted to counter this as a rabbi in Berlin by encouraging Jewish pride among Germany's Jewish community; later, during his time in America in the 1960s and 70s, when the phrase "Black is beautiful" became more prevalent as a statement of Black pride, Prinz would remark that that was the essence of what he had been trying to teach German Jews back in 1920s Berlin. Prince had also tried to actively counter the scientific racism of the Nazis, which, though influential on Prinz's immediate circle, were unable to convince a broader audience. After arriving to the United States, Prinz spoke up against racial segregation, as well as racism within the Jewish community, as he viewed Jewish assimilation in the United States, especially assimilation into accepting anti-Black racism, to be immoral in its own right, a betrayal of Jewish values, and a strategic error no less grave than the hyper-assimilation of the Jews of Germany. During the March on Washington for Jobs and Freedom, Prinz would be the only Jewish speaker and the speaker immediately before Martin Luther King Jr. Prinz warned in his speech not merely of bigotry, but of silence, and how such silence had allowed the Holocaust to happen in his home country of Germany.

==== Martin Luther King Jr. and Zionism ====
In part due to his connections with Jewish figures in the civil rights movement, Martin Luther King Jr. was a adamant believer in Israel's right to exist and was a Zionist.

During the leadup to the Six-Day War, King spoke on behalf of a coalition of Christian theologians to support Israel and warning that the closing of the Suez Canal and Tiran Straits could lead to war, something King hoped would be avoided. Following the start of the Six-Day War, the New Politics Conference, a Black Power and New Left organization inspired by the Black Panther Party, opposed support for Israel, calling Israel's defensive actions an "imperialist Zionist war." In reaction to this, King, who had participated in the New Politics Conference of 1967 and offered some brief remarks, came out in opposition to antisemitism in a letter to Morris B. Abram, head of the American Jewish Committee, lambasting the New Politics Conference for its flattening of the Israeli-Arab conflict, arguing that this statement only worked to create a rift in Jewish-African American relations, noting that African Americans and Jews "'have collectively collaborated in the struggle for justice.'" He also sent a letter to the head of the Jewish Labor Committee, making it clear his participation in the conference was most limited and added that “I would have made it crystal clear that I could not have supported any resolution calling for Black separatism or calling for a condemnation of Israel and an unqualified endorsement of the policy of the Arab powers...Israel’s right to exist as a state is incontestable." King further added that many of the leaders of the more conservative Arab forces (like Saudi Arabia) were being backed by American oil businesses in opposition to the then socialistic Israel, and thus peace would only be possible between progressive Arab partners in the region.

== See also ==
- African-American Jews
- Black Panthers (Israel)
- Reform Zionism
- Jewish anti-Zionism
- Jewish left
- Jews of color
- Jews of Color Initiative
- Native American–Jewish relations
- Opposition to antisemitism
- Racial antisemitism
- Racism in Jewish communities
