= Jewish visibility =

Jewish visibility (or visibly Jewish) is a term referring to Jews who are visibly identifiable as Jewish. The term can also refer to visible representations of Jews in media and public life. A person may become visibly Jewish by publicly identifying as Jewish, by participation in Jewish communal life (such as synagogue attendance), by publicly wearing Jewish religious clothing, and by having names or physical features stereotyped as Jewish. People who are visibly Jewish may be at a higher risk of experiencing antisemitism. Those who are stereotyped according to their physical features may experience racial antisemitism. In addition to people, buildings and other physical properties can be visibly Jewish, particularly synagogues and Jewish cemeteries. Jewish visibility/invisibility can also be used to refer to marginalized populations within Jewish communities, such as Jews of color and poor Jews.

== Examples ==
People who publicly wear Jewish religious clothing or Jewish cultural signifiers, including many, but not all, Orthodox Jews, may be visibly identifiable as Jewish. Religious or cultural clothing and styles that can cause a person to become visibly Jewish include yarmulkes, sheitels, tichels, shtreimels, kashkets, gartels, kittels, tallit, tzitzit, tefillin, and payot. Jewelry, necklaces, and clothing including a Magen David, mezuzah, hamsa, Chai, or other Jewish symbol or style may also mark a person as visibly Jewish. Speaking Yiddish, Ladino, Hebrew, or another Jewish language can cause a person to become visibly Jewish. Jewish names and ethnic physical features stereotyped as Jewish may also cause a person to be visibly Jewish. Physical features commonly stereotyped as Jewish may include body shape, height, facial features, dark hair or curly hair, and dark eye color, as well as nose size and shape. People with stereotypical Jewish features are often described as "looking Jewish". At times, some Jews have altered their features to more closely resemble non-Jewish people, such as by dyeing or straightening their hair. Some converts to Judaism may not be viewed as Jewish under certain circumstances due to lacking Jewish names or physical features stereotyped as Jewish. Some white converts may be assumed to be Christian in mainstream non-Jewish spaces. Jews who have Jewish ancestry may also be perceived as non-Jewish if they lack stereotypical features. The assumption that a person "looks Jewish" in Western countries is often based around European stereotypes of the appearance of Jewish people, a phenomenon which can be rooted in Ashkenormativity as well as racial antisemitism. Jews of color, particularly Black Jews, may be viewed as people of color rather than or before being viewed as Jews.

Jews of color may suffer from invisibility within Jewish communities. Contributing factors to the lack of visibility for Jews of color include surveys that underestimate the population of Jews of color, lack of research on Jews of color, as well as Jews of color being less likely to participate in Jewish communal life, often due to racism. However, Jews of color may be more likely to participate in Jewish surveys in an attempt to improve visibility for Jews of color.

Jews of all denominations may be visibly Jewish, including Reform, Conservative and Reconstructionist Jews, as well as secular Jews who have no religion. Orthodox Jews are often more visibly Jewish than non-Orthodox Jews because many Orthodox Jews publicly wear religious clothing. The term "visibly Jewish" is often used to refer to Orthodox Jews; however, not all Orthodox Jews are visibly Jewish, and many non-Orthodox Jews are. On average, American Orthodox Jews report feeling less safe due to antisemitism, compared to American non-Orthodox Jews.

The UJA-Federation of New York has written that "Visibly Jewish individuals are attacked in Brooklyn with alarming frequency".

In societies where circumcision is rare, such as many European countries, a Jewish man being circumcised may cause him to be visibly Jewish. Because male circumcision was rare in Germany, Nazi and Nazi collaborationist forces often performed genital inspections on men who were apprehended to ascertain whether a man was Jewish or not.

Due to the systematic destruction of Polish-Jewish society during the Holocaust, many people of Jewish descent in Poland hid their heritage. During the 21st century, there has been an increase of Jewish visibility in Polish society, as many Polish people have rediscovered and embraced their previously hidden or unknown Jewish heritage.

In 2021, the German-Jewish writer Levi Israel Ufferfilge published Nicht ohne meine Kippa! ("Not Without My Kippah!"), a book detailing his experience of antisemitism in Germany as a visibly Jewish man.

In 2021, New York Governor Andrew Cuomo condemned a series of antisemitic attacks against "visibly Jewish New Yorkers".

Writing for the Columbus Jewish News, Ben Cohen has argued that there is prejudice against visibly Orthodox Jews within Jewish communities, claiming that "raw prejudice among Jews against those who are visibly Jewish – that they are loud, rude, unwashed, contemptuous towards outsiders, and all the rest of that baggage – is our community's dirty secret".

== See also ==
- Antisemitism
- Ashkenormativity
- Circumcision
- Crypto-Judaism
- Ethnic plastic surgery
  - The Operated Jew
- Jewish assimilation
- Jews of color
- Passing (racial identity)
- Racial antisemitism
- Social invisibility
- Visible minority
- Yellow badge
