= The Operated Jew =

1893 antisemitic book by Oskar Panizza

- Author: Oskar Panizza
- Original title: Der operirte Jud'
- Language: German
- Published: 1893

The Operated Jew (German: Der operirte Jud’) is a satirical antisemitic book published by German physician Oskar Panizza in 1893. Written from a supposedly medical perspective, it exemplified the scientific racism characteristic of the era.

== Plot summary ==
A young Jewish medical student, Itzig Faitel Stern, has stereotypical Jewish features: curly black sidelocks, oily yellowish skin, thick lips, a large hooked nose, a nasal voice full of Yiddishisms, poor posture, and bow legs; as well as a habit of arguing Talmudically with himself and a phobia of toilets. Stern seeks to erase his Jewishness and acquire a "German soul," which he attempts by submitting himself to exaggerated ethnic plastic surgery. He buys surgery to straighten his bones, a spiked belt to correct his posture, and speech therapy to disguise his voice; his hair is straightened and dyed blonde; he even buys a blood transfusion of Christian blood. Finally, having paid for a Christian birth certificate under the name "Siegfried Freudenstern," Stern marries the blonde daughter of a Hannoverian civil servant. However, at his wedding feast "Freudenstern" indulges in too much champagne. The more he drinks, the more his previous Jewish features resurface — his chin sinks, his hair darkens, his lips thicken, his Yiddish interjections and argumentative habits re-emerge — horrifying his would-be bride, until finally he soils himself and collapses into a pile of gelatinous goo.

== Analysis ==
The book incorporates the elements of racial antisemitism of the era: the expression of desire on the part of the Jew to escape his cultural identity, the lengths to which he will go to transform himself, the pornographic quality of the attempted transformation, and the impossibility of it all. The author sought to illustrate the idea that Jews cannot escape their race. The image of Stern's Jewishness atavistically reasserting itself at his wedding signifies that Jewishness cannot be overcome by attempts at cultural assimilation.

== See also ==
- "Coon, Coon, Coon"
- Ethnic plastic surgery
- Jewish DNA
- Passing (racial identity)
- Racial antisemitism
- Self-hating Jew
- Visibly Jewish
