= Black Judaism =

Judaism that is predominantly practiced by African communities

Black Judaism is variation of Judaism that is practiced by communities of African descent, both within Africa and within the African diaspora, including North America, Europe, Israel, and elsewhere. Significant examples of Black Judaism include Judaism as it is practiced by Ethiopian Jews and African-American Jews. Jews who may be considered Black have existed for millennia, with Zipporah sometimes considered to be one of the first Black Jews who was mentioned within Jewish history.

Judaism has been present in sub-Saharan Africa for centuries. Beginning in the fifteenth century, Jews who were fleeing persecution in Spain and Portugal founded small mixed communities along the coast of West Africa. There was also an identifiable Black Jewish community which was probably of Spanish origin in the west African Kingdom of Loango until the end of the nineteenth century. Moreover, throughout Africa Jewish communities were generated as part of the interaction between colonialism, Christianity and African societies. The connection between colonialism and the development of Jewish identities in South Africa was first shown by the South African Religious Studies scholar David Chidester in 1996. In 2002, Tudor Parfitt, a British historian, argued that the production of Judaic communities was part of the complex symbiosis between African societies, colonialism and Christianity and moreover, it was a product of western colonialism throughout the world, from New Zealand to the Americas. He produced many examples of Judaic manifestations which existed throughout sub-Saharan Africa both during and after the colonial period. His argument was that such manifestations of Judaism were often constructed as part of an Othering process by Europeans, and they were often internalized by African communities.

Black Hebrew Israelites are religious groups whose members claim descent from the Tribes of Israel, but these claims are rejected by Jewish communities and these groups are not recognized as Jewish by any Jewish community. According to the Black Orthodox Jewish writer and activist Shais Rishon, the Black Hebrew Israelite movement is not part of "the mainstream normative Black Jewish community" that practices Rabbinic Judaism.

== Black communities of the Jewish diaspora ==
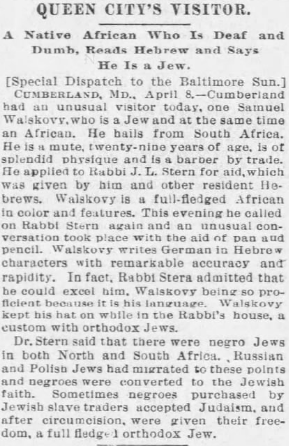
An 1897 article in the Baltimore Sun about Samuel Walskovy, a Black South African Jew.

=== Ugandan Jews ===
The Abayudaya are a group of Bagwere and Busoga people who collectively converted to Judaism in the early 20th century, under the leadership of Semei Kakungulu. Persecuted under the regime of Idi Amin, the community has since revitalized, with a current population of around 2,000 to 3,000 people. Kulanu, an organization which is dedicated to Jewish outreach, has sent emissaries from Israel to help the Abayudaya practice mainstream Judaism and work to be recognized by the Chief Rabbinate of Israel.

=== North American Black Jews ===
Black Judaism in North America is an umbrella of religious movements that developed in North America, particularly the American South by Black slaves prior to and following the American Civil War. Most commonly associated with this group are the Hebrew Israelites, who claim to be descended from the tribes of Israel, but otherwise are varied in their beliefs. Due to this wide variation in the religious beliefs within the Hebrew Israelites and the complex development of these beliefs, scholars have disagreed on how to characterize this religion, arguing the extent to which the origin is a Jewish religious movement and to what extent it is a Black religious movement. Both politically and socially, members of this group are usually not considered part of the larger Jewish group, their practices and interpretation often being seen as outside the realm of traditional Judaism.

== See also ==
- History of the Jews in Africa
- Jewish views on slavery
- Jews of color
- Racism in Jewish communities
