= Oskar Panizza =

German psychiatrist and writer

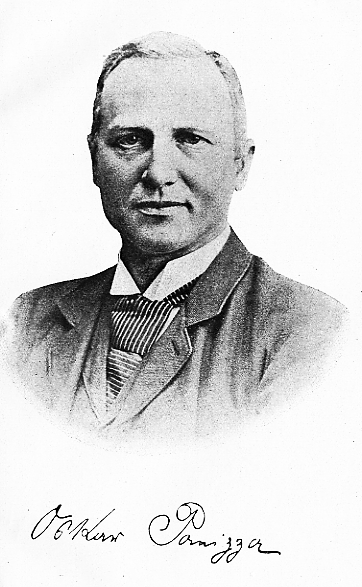
- Oskar Panizza
- Born: 12 November 1853; Bad Kissingen, Kingdom of Bavaria
- Died: 28 September 1921 (aged 67); Bayreuth, Bavaria, Germany
- Scientific career
- Fields: Psychiatrist

Leopold Hermann Oskar Panizza (12 November 1853 – 28 September 1921) was a German psychiatrist and avant-garde playwright, novelist, poet, essayist, publisher and literary journal editor. He is best known for his provocative tragicomedy, Das Liebeskonzil (The Love Council, 1894), for which he served a one-year prison sentence after being convicted in Munich in 1895 on 93 counts of blasphemy. Upon his release from prison, he lived for eight years in exile, first in Zürich and later in Paris.

His deteriorating mental health forced him to return to Germany, where he spent his last sixteen years in an asylum in Bayreuth. The scandal-ridden Panizza suffered more than any other German author under the repressive censorship imposed during the reign of Kaiser Wilhelm II.

== Biography ==
=== Early years ===
Panizza was born in Bad Kissingen, northern Bavaria (Lower Franconia), to Karl (1808–1855) and Mathilde Panizza, née Speeth (1821–1915). Karl was descended from a family of Italian fishermen on Lake Como. Mathilde, herself a prolific writer under the pseudonym Siona, was descended from an aristocratic Huguenot family by the name of de Meslère. Oskar's four siblings were Maria (1846–1925), Felix (1848–1908), Karl (1852–1916) and Ida (1855–1922).

Religious friction between Oskar's parents began even before their marriage. When Oskar was two years old, his Catholic father died of typhoid. On his deathbed, Karl granted Mathilde permission to raise their five children in the Protestant faith, despite the fact that they had all been baptized Catholic at his insistence. It was only after years of struggling and several lost trials that King Maximilian II of Bavaria finally granted Mathilde permission to educate her children in the Protestant faith.

Mathilde Panizza was the proprietor of the Hotel Russischer Hof, purchased in 1850, a renowned establishment that catered to Russian nobility and other distinguished guests in the popular spa town. By his own and his mother's accounts, Oskar was a rebellious and difficult child. In 1863, the nine-year-old was enrolled in the Pietistic boarding school in Kornthal, Württemberg. In 1869 he transferred to the humanistic Gymnasium (school) in Schweinfurt. Two years later, Mathilde reluctantly agreed to allow her seventeen-year-old son to continue his studies in Munich, where he had to repeat the first year before he dropped out of school altogether to pursue a short-lived singing career.

=== From psychiatrist to poet ===
After fulfilling his military service as a conscript in the Bavarian army, followed by a grave bout of cholera, Panizza returned to his old Gymnasium in Schweinfurt. There he finally received his Abitur degree at the advanced age of 24. Later in 1877, he enrolled at the Ludwig-Maximilians-Universität München, where he completed his medical studies in 1880 with a dissertation on microorganisms in sputum. After some months in Paris pursuing his twin interests of psychiatry and poetry, he returned to Munich to become an assistant to Dr. Bernhard von Gudden, one of Germany's leading psychiatrists. During the two years that Panizza worked for Gudden, he was colleagues with Emil Kraepelin, who would later also become a renowned psychiatrist.

A turning point in Panizza's life came in 1883, when the thirty-year-old convinced his mother, who had profitably sold her hotel, to establish a trust that would provide him with an annual allowance of six thousands marks. With this financial backing, he abandoned medicine in 1884 and devoted himself exclusively to literary pursuits. While suffering a major depression that year, Panizza had discovered the curative and therapeutic value of writing. His first three volumes of poetry were rather crude constructions in jagged tetrameter, consciously inspired by Heinrich Heine: Düstre Lieder (1886), Londoner Lieder (1887) and Legendäres und Fabelhaftes (1889).

=== The Munich Moderns ===
Panizza's first collection of fiction, Dämmrungsstücke, appeared in 1890, received a modest amount of critical acclaim in the press and brought him to the attention of Germany's leading literary figures. By the end of 1890, the obscure psychiatrist had got to know most of the Munich "Moderns," as the young naturalists called themselves, including Frank Wedekind, Otto Julius Bierbaum and Max Halbe. The most significant of these was Michael Georg Conrad, editor of the influential journal Die Gesellschaft since 1885. The two Franconians became close friends, and from 1890 to 1896 Panizza published over forty articles in Die Gesellschaft on widely varied topics, ranging from theater reviews to theoretical considerations of prostitution.

Panizza became an avid member of the Gesellschaft für modernes Leben (Society for Modern Life), which Conrad founded in 1890 together with Detlev von Liliencron, Otto Julius Bierbaum, Julius Schaumberger, Hanns von Gumppenberger and Georg Schaumberg. One of Panizza's notable presentations was a lecture in 1891 titled Genie und Wahnsinn (Genius and Madness), which drew heavily on the work of Cesare Lombroso. Of particular interest even today are Panizza's discussions of hallucinations and model psychosis, hashish and the hallucinatory basis of religion.

With the publication in 1893 of Die unbefleckte Empfängnis der Päpste (The Immaculate Conception of the Popes), Panizza embarked on a path of militant anti-Catholicism. This work and a subsequent polemic, Der teutsche Michel und der römische Papst (The German Fool and the Roman Pope, 1894), were confiscated by the district attorney and banned from the German Empire.

Another 1893 book by Panizza, The Operated Jew, is an antisemitic satire written from a medical perspective. The book describes the efforts of a grotesquely caricatured German Jewish academic, the fictional Itzig Faitel Stern, to integrate into bourgeois German society and pass as ethnically German. Stern undergoes plastic surgery, changes his name, converts to Protestantism, and becomes engaged to a Christian woman. At his wedding ceremony, his Jewish characteristics resurface, he returns to speaking in an exaggerated Yiddish-influenced German vernacular, and he eventually melts into a puddle on the floor. The story exemplifies the racial antisemitism of the time.

=== Das Liebeskonzil ===
The work that was to unalterably change his life was Das Liebeskonzil (The Love Council), which was published in Zürich in October 1894. Subtitled "A Heavenly Tragedy in Five Acts," it is set in 1495, the first historically documented outbreak of syphilis. In scenes alternating between heaven, hell and the Vatican, Das Liebeskonzil portrays the dreaded venereal disease as God's vengeance on his sexually hyperactive human creatures, especially those surrounding Pope Alexander VI (Rodrigo Borgia). The play was produced as Le Concil D'Amour in Paris in 1969 by The Théâtre de Paris. With 'scandalous' costumes by Leonor Fini the play won numerous awards, including the prestigious "Le Prix des Critiques" for Fini's costumes and sets.

Most shocking of all was Panizza's naturalistic depiction of the entities worshipped by Catholics: God appears as a senile old fool, Christ is dimwitted and weak, while a sexually promiscuous Mary is the one firmly in control of negotiations with the devil. Satan's assignment is to develop a suitable punishment that will devastate sinners' bodies but still leave their souls capable of salvation. Together with Salome, the devil fathers a beautiful woman, who will spread the poison (originally a "virus" in Panizza's manuscript) among unsuspecting humans.

Even though the work appeared in Switzerland, the district attorney in Munich charged Panizza with 93 counts of blasphemy in violation of §166 of the Imperial Strafgesetzbuch (Criminal Code). As a result, Panizza became an instant literary celebrity, with authors ranging from a teenaged Thomas Mann to Theodor Fontane, the 76-year-old dean of German letters, weighing in on one side or the other of the raging debate. In April 1895, Panizza was convicted after a one-day trial, for which had written an extensive literary defense. After several failed appeals, Panizza served his full 12-month sentence at the prison in Amberg, where he was released in August 1896.

=== Swiss Sojourn ===
After serving his prison sentence, Panizza moved to Zurich, where he founded the journal Zürcher Diskussionen, which dealt with all aspects of "modern life." Between 1897 and 1902, he published 32 issues of the journal, which contained mostly his own articles, often appearing under such pseudonyms as Hans Kirstemaecker, Louis Andrée, Hans Detmar and Sven Heidenstamm. Some of the more intriguing articles range from "A Psychopathological Discussion of Christ" to "The Pig in its Poetical, Mythological and Cultural-Historical Aspects."

Among the literary works published during his Swiss exile in 1898 were the political satire Psichopatia Criminalis and the historical drama Nero. Throughout his Swiss sojourn, Panizza's mental health gradually began to deteriorate. His orthography also became more deviant, as his spelling grew progressively more phonetic.

At the end of 1898, Panizza was abruptly expelled from Switzerland after being declared an undesirable alien. The reasoning behind this expulsion remains unclear. Although there was a complaint against the author by a fifteen-year-old prostitute, Olga, who served Panizza as a photographic model, there were no charges filed. It may have been a heightened fear of foreign anarchists that led to his expulsion. At any rate, he once more packed up his belongings, including his extensive library of ten thousand books, and moved to Paris.

=== Parisjana ===
The six years Panizza spent in Paris were not nearly as productive as the preceding ones. By the end of 1899, he had completed 97 poems in tetrameter, which may be the most vitriolic anti-German verse written by a German poet in the nineteenth century. These poems appeared in the collection Parisjana (1899), the last book to be published by Panizza. He characterized this volume as a work "in which the author's personal opponent, Wilhelm II, is portrayed as the public enemy of mankind and culture." As a result of his libelous poetry directed against the Kaiser, Panizza was charged with lèse-majesté and his entire trust fund was impounded. When he could no longer pay the rent, he returned to Munich in April 1901 and turned himself in to the authorities.

After several months of incarceration, including extensive psychiatric examinations at the same institution where twenty years previously he had worked as a young doctor, Panizza was diagnosed with systematic paranoia. All criminal charges were dropped due to insanity, and he was free to return to Paris, where he lived for three more years.

=== Demise ===
Panizza's progressive paranoia and auditory hallucinations propelled him back to Munich in 1904. After a suicide attempt, his failure to be admitted to the psychiatric clinic, and the refusal of his 84-year-old mother to even see him, in October 1904 he provoked his own arrest by striding down the bustling Leopoldstraße wearing only a shirt.

In 1905 Panizza was admitted to Herzogshöhe, an asylum for wealthy heart and circulatory patients on the outskirts of Bayreuth. After being declared mentally incompetent, he was placed under the tutelage of a brother and later Deacon Friedrich Lippert, who had befriended him during his imprisonment at Amberg. He spent the last sixteen years of his life in this institution, where he died of a stroke in 1921. He is buried in an unmarked grave in the Bayreuth municipal cemetery.

== Selected works ==
- 1881 Über Myelin, Pigment, Epithelien und Micrococcen im Sputum (Med. Dissertation), Leipzig: J.B. Hirschfeld, 1881.
- Düstre Lieder. Leipzig: Unflad, 1886.
- Londoner Lieder. Leipzig: Unflad, 1887.
- Legendäres und Fabelhaftes. Unflad, 1889.
- Dämmrungsstücke. Leipzig: Wilhelm Friedrich, 1890.
- Aus dem Tagebuch eines Hundes. Leipzig: Wilhelm Friedrich, 1892.
- Die unbefleckte Empfängnis der Päpste. Zürich: Verlagsmagazin J. Schabelitz, 1893.
- Der teutsche Michel und der römische Papst. Leipzig: Wilhelm Friedrich, 1894.
- Das Liebeskonzil. Eine Himmels-Tragödie in fünf Aufzügen. Zürich: Verlags-Magazin J. Schabelitz, 1895 (October 1894).
- Der Illusionismus und die Rettung der Persönlichkeit. Leipzig: Wilhelm Friedrich, 1895.
- Meine Verteidigung in Sachen "Das Liebeskonzil". Zürich: Verlagsmagazin J. Schabelitz, 1895.
- Abschied von München. Ein Handschlag. Zürich: Verlagsmagazin J. Schabelitz, 1896.
- Dialoge im Geiste Hutten's. Zürich: Verlag der Zürcher Diskußjonen, 1897.
- Die Haberfeldtreiben im bairischen Gebirge. Eine sittengeschichtliche Studie. Berlin: S. Fischer, 1897.
- Psichopatia criminalis. Anleitung um die vom Gericht für notwendig erkanten Geisteskrankheiten psichjatrisch zu eruïren und wissenschaftlich festzustellen. Für Ärzte, Laien, Juristen, Vormünder, Verwaltungsbeamte, Minister etc. Zürich: Verlag der Zürcher Diskußjonen, 1898.
- Nero. Tragödie in fünf Aufzügen. Zürich: Verlag Zürcher Diskußionen, 1898.
- Parisjana. Deutsche Verse aus Paris. Zürich: Verlag Zürcher Diskußionen, 1899.
- Das Schwein in poetischer, mitologischer und sittengeschichtlicher Beziehung. Zürich: Verlag Zürcher Diskußionen, 1900.

Posthumous Manuscripts

- Imperjalja. Manuskript Germ. Qu. 1838 der Handschriftenabteilung der Staatlichen Museen Preußischer Kulturbesitz zu Berlin. Pressler, Hürtgenwald 1993 (= Schriften zu Psychopathologie, Kunst und Literatur. Band 5), ISBN 3-87646-077-8
- "Selbstbiographie". In: Der Fall Oskar Panizza. Ed. Hentrich, Berlin 1989. S. 8–14.
- Pour Gambetta. Sämtliche in der Prinzhorn-Sammlung der Psychiatrischen Universitätsklinik Heidelberg und im Landeskirchlichen Archiv Nürnberg aufbewahrten Zeichnungen. Edition Belleville, München 1989, ISBN 3-923646-30-5
- Mama Venus. Texte zu Religion, Sexus und Wahn Luchterhand-Literaturverlag, Hamburg/Zürich 1992, Sammlung Luchterhand 1025. ISBN 3-630-71025-5.

English Translations

- The Pig: In Poetic, Mythological, and Moral-Historical Perspective (translation by Erik Butler; Wakefield Press, 2016). ISBN 978-1-939663-15-3
