= Judeo-Romani =

Judeo-Romani may refer to:

== Ethnicities ==
- Zhutane Roma, a group of Bulgarian Judeo-Roma who arose in Sofia, Bulgaria during World War II
- Baltic Romani Jews, a group of Judeo-Roma who live in and around the Baltic Areas.
- Judeo-Kale, a Sephardic Romani subgroup that can be found across Latin America, Spain, France, and Portugal

== Languages ==
- Judeo-Domari, or the Southern Dialect of the Domari language as it is spoken by Jewish Domaris in Israel.
