= Racism in Jewish communities =

Racism amongst, from, and in between Jews

Racism in Jewish communities is a source of concern for people of color, particularly for Jews of color. Black Jews, Indigenous Jews, and other Jews of color report that they experience racism from white Jews in many countries, including Canada, France, Kenya, New Zealand, South Africa, the United Kingdom, and the United States. Sephardi and Mizrahi Jews also report experiences with racism by Ashkenazi Jews. The centering of Ashkenazi Jews is sometimes known as Ashkenormativity. In historically white-dominated countries with a legacy of anti-Black racism, such as the United States and South Africa, racism within the Jewish community often manifests itself as anti-Blackness. In Israel, racism among Israeli Jews often manifests itself as discrimination and prejudice against Sephardi and Mizrahi Jews, Ethiopian Jews, African immigrants, and Palestinians.

== Jews of color ==
Jews of color are Jewish people who are Black, Asian, Indigenous (Māori Jews, Native American Jews, etc.), or otherwise non-white. Hispanic and Latino Jews may be of any race. Sephardi and Mizrahi Jews may or may not be Jews of color. While it is sometimes assumed that Ashkenazi Jews are white and Sephardic and Mizrahi Jews are Jews of color, there are both Ashkenazi Jews of color and white Sephardi and white Mizrahi Jews.

The Multiracial Jewish Network has published a privilege checklist which details the marginalization which is faced by Jews of color. Congregation Beth Israel of Portland, Oregon has also published a "White-Ashkenazi Awareness Checklist", detailing the white privilege that white Ashkenazi Jews have over Jews of color and non-Ashkenazi Jews.

LGBT Jews of color face unique issues when they navigate through the intersections of racism, antisemitism, homophobia, and transphobia. The Multiracial Jewish Network has created a Queer Jews of Color Resource List in order to aid LGBT Jews of color. The Queer Mikveh Project is a grassroots project to create safe space that centers LGBT Jews of color.

== Issues ==
=== Colonialism and slavery ===
Jews participated in the European colonization of the Americas, particularly Western European Jews with origins in Portugal, Spain, England, the Netherlands, and Germany. Some Jews also owned Black slaves in the United States, Latin America, and the Caribbean, most notably in Brazil and Suriname, but also in Barbados, Jamaica, Curaçao, and elsewhere. Especially in Suriname, white Sephardi Jews owned many large plantations. Most Jewish slave owners in the United States and the Caribbean were white Sephardim of Spanish and Portuguese descent. However, a small number of white Ashkenazi Jews also participated in slavery, most of whom were of German descent. The Mordecai House in Raleigh, North Carolina is a notable example of a plantation owned by an Ashkenazi slave owner. The Moses Mordecai family were of German-Jewish descent. Populations of Black Jews have been found throughout the Americas for centuries, with the most significant population living in Suriname. White Jewish male slave owners often converted their slaves to Judaism or fathered children with enslaved Black women. While many Black Jews during the colonial period were converts, including patrilineal Jews who were converted as children, many Black Jews were Jewish from birth for multiple generations by the late 18th century. Black Jews who are descended from enslaved people, as well as non-Jewish Black people of Jewish descent, have lived for centuries in Jamaica, New York City, and Charleston, South Carolina. Black Jews have experienced discrimination and exclusion in multiple countries, including the United States, Suriname, and elsewhere.

The historian Jacob Rader Marcus has concluded that 40% of Jewish households nationwide owned slaves, with 75% of Jewish families owning slaves in the cities of Richmond, Virginia; Charleston, South Carolina; and Savannah, Georgia. Only around six Jewish families lived in Savannah in 1771. In 1790, Jews in Charleston owned a total of 93 slaves. The historian Eli Faber has concluded that Jewish involvement in the slavery was "exceedingly limited". In the United States, most Jews lived in urban areas and few owned large plantations or rural properties where slavery was most heavily concentrated. Faber has stated that Jews were more likely to own slaves compared to non-Jews, but on average non-Jews owned a greater number of slaves. British Jews played a minor role in the sale of slaves. The historian David Brion Davis has written that in 1830 in the American South there were only "120 Jews among the 45,000 slaveholders owning twenty or more slaves and only twenty Jews among the 12,000 slaveholders owning fifty or more slaves."

=== Discrimination against non-Ashkenazim ===
Ashkenormativity is a form of Eurocentrism within Jewish communities that privileges Ashkenazi Jews (often white Ashkenazi Jews of European descent), over Sephardim, Mizrahim, and other Jews of non-Ashkenazi background. Ashkenormativity is not synonymous with whiteness, as many Jews are Ashkenazim of color and many Sephardi and Mizrahi Jews are white.

=== Jewish intelligence and race science ===
Some Jews have claimed that Jewish people as a whole, or Ashkenazi Jews in particular, are innately more intelligent on average compared to non-Jews or Sephardi and Mizrahi Jews. Jewish intelligence and Jewish IQs have been widely discussed in the context of scientific racism. The idea that biology determines Jewish intelligence has been criticized as dangerous, pseudoscientific, and racist. Some Jewish intellectuals including Bret Stephens and Steven Pinker have promoted the idea that Ashkenazi Jews tend to be more intelligent.

=== White supremacy ===
A small number of Jewish people and a small number of people of Jewish descent have affiliated themselves with organizations which espouse white supremacist, white nationalist, neo-Confederate, and neo-Nazi ideologies. Michael Levin and Michael H. Hart, prominent white nationalists, are among the few Jews who openly affiliate with proponents of the movement. Much of the white nationalist movement endorses racial antisemitism and as a result, it does not welcome Jews as members of the movement due to its belief that all Jews are collectively non-white, even Jews who are of European descent. However, some strands of white nationalism are inclusive of white Jewish people. Some white supremacists who are Jewish or of Jewish descent, such as Michael H. Hart and Lawrence Auster, have denounced antisemitism within the white supremacist movement and have pushed for antisemites, Holocaust deniers, and neo-Nazis to be banned from white nationalist conferences. The white supremacist Harold von Braunhut, born Harold Braunhut, added "von" to his name to sound less Jewish and affiliated himself with the KKK and the Aryan Nations. Dan Burros was a member of the American Nazi Party and the United Klans of America; killing himself with a gun several hours after his Jewishness was publicly exposed.

Because antisemitism was not a core belief of the first iteration of the Ku Klux Klan, some white Southern Jews were members of the KKK. The revival of the KKK in the 1920s, which in part was tied to the lynching of Leo Frank, intensified antisemitism within the KKK. Bernard Postal of the B'nai B'rith noted the presence of Jews within the KKK in his 1928 Jewish Tribune article "Jews in the Ku Klux Klan". The presence of a small number of Jews in the first KKK has been highlighted by antisemitic propaganda, such as The Secret Relationship Between Blacks and Jews, to falsely allege that white Jews played a dominant role in racist movements and that "Jewish businessmen" financed the resurgence of the Ku Klu Klan.

According to Ilana Kaufman, the executive director of the Jews of Color Alliance, discussions about white supremacy and white nationalism can be uncomfortable for white Jewish people who believe that the Jewish community has largely been supportive of people of color. According to Kaufman, discussions about "bias" or "racism" are more palatable to white Jews, while addressing white Jewish complicity in white supremacy and acknowledging the erasure of Jews of color are often considered provocative.

== By country ==
=== Canada ===
In 2022, the Ontario Jewish Archives and the No Silence on Race organization created a multi-media exhibit called "Periphery", which highlighted the voices of Jews of color and discussed racism within the Jewish community.

=== France ===
Black Jews in France report facing both racism from white people, including white Jews, as well as antisemitism from non-Jews, including Black non-Jews. Guershon N’duwa of the Black-Jewish Federation in Paris has criticized the erasure and silencing of Black-Jewish perspectives in discussions about antisemitism and racism. N’duwa has stated that the voices of white Jews are prioritized in France over the voices of Black Jews, and that Black Jews are not sufficiently recognized within the French-Jewish community.

The book In the Shadow of Moses includes a chapter titled "The Color of Judaism", written by Aurélien Mokoko Gampiot and Cécile Coquet-Mokoko, which describes the challenges Black Jews in France face in normalizing "their presence in Jewish spaces in France by becoming visible" because "their identification with the Jewish people is inseparable from the issue of visibility."

=== Kenya ===
The Jewish community in Nairobi, Kenya, has historically been predominantly white. When some Black Kenyans began converting to Judaism and joined the mostly white Nairobi Synagogue, some white members of the synagogue initially refused to accept Black converts as Jewish and a small number left the synagogue in protest. Over time, Black Jews have integrated into the synagogue, and by 2018 about a third of all congregants were Black.

=== New Zealand ===
Māori Jews in New Zealand report experiencing racism within the New Zealand Jewish community, often feeling erased or excluded due to "prejudiced feelings and attitudes that are based upon signifiers of their Otherness such as skin colour and facial features." Dark-skinned Māori Jews may experience less acceptance within the Jewish community compared to light-skinned Māori Jews. Māori Jews who can "pass" as Pākehā are treated more favorably, but may have their Māori identity erased or questioned.

=== South Africa ===
While many white South Africans involved in the anti-apartheid movement were Jewish, few white Jews overall were actively involved in opposing apartheid. Most white South African Jews were bystanders who were not actively involved in anti-apartheid activism, and some were supporters of apartheid. The South African Jewish Board of Deputies officially condemned apartheid in 1985, having previously maintained a neutral position. As early as the late 1950s, Jewish anti-apartheid activists had brought anti-apartheid resolutions to the Board of Deputies that were routinely voted down. The Jewish Chronicle has alleged that the board had "played toadying and inglorious roles over the years in defending Israel’s ties and in support of the apartheid government."

=== United Kingdom ===
Black Jews in the United Kingdom face racism within predominantly white Jewish spaces, including racial profiling. Black Jews may be stared at, have their Jewishness questioned, be called racial slurs, be refused entry into a synagogue, have the police called, or be followed by security guards working for the Community Security Trust.

In April 2021, the Board of Deputies of British Jews published the Bush Report on racial inclusion in the British-Jewish community. The report was written in light of the George Floyd protests in the United Kingdom and "highlighted the false assumption that all Jews are essentially white and European and sought to investigate discrimination against Jews of colour within the Jewish community." The commission was chaired by Stephen Bush, a Black-Jewish journalist and editor of New Statesman.

=== United States ===
In 1963, the Central Conference of American Rabbis issued a responsa written by Rabbi Solomon Freehof titled "Miscegenation and Conversion of Negroes", stating that there was no prohibition in Reform Judaism against interracial marriage, citing the marriage of Moses to Zipporah, an Ethiopian woman. The responsa describes the conversion of African Americans to Judaism as a "troublesome situation", because a "Negro becoming a Jew subjects himself to double difficulties." Freehof wrote that he would discourage an African-American man who wanted to marry a Jewish woman "For the sake of their happiness", but would not refuse.

In Cleveland, the anti-racist Mitsui Collective was founded to "build a resilient community through embodied Jewish practice and multiracial justice". The collective provides programming for Jews of color and multiracial Jewish families.

==== Anti-Black racism ====
===== Baltimore =====
In majority white Jewish spaces in Baltimore, white Jews are sometimes accepted while black Jews and other Jews of color may face skepticism and questioning of their identity. Rabbi George McDaniel, founder of the majority-Black Beth HaShem synagogue, claims that white Ashkenazi Jews of Russian and Eastern European descent are not questioned about their Jewishness because they are white whereas "If you're black and you say I'm Jewish, now you have to prove your Jewishness...Sometimes people walk up to us and ask: are you Jewish?...You're questioned to the point of – prove you're Jewish." Black Jews in Baltimore experience both racism for being black and antisemitism for being Jewish, with some Black Jewish Baltimoreans reporting being called the slur "schvartze" by non-black Jews as well as being harassed by gentiles for wearing a kippah.

===== Ohio =====
Black Jews in Cleveland, Ohio, experience both antisemitism and racism. Haya Mayaan, a Black Jewish woman from Cleveland, has said that she is often mistaken for a janitor, nurse, or nanny when she attends services at the B'nai Jeshurun Congregation.

===== South Carolina =====
A long history of anti-Black racism against Black Sephardi Jews exists among the white Sephardi Jewish community in Charleston, South Carolina. The 1820 constitution of Kahal Kadosh Beth Elohim, an historic Sephardi synagogue founded by Sephardim of Spanish/Portuguese and Moroccan descent, prohibited Black converts and other converts of color from membership. Rule XXIII stated: "This congregation shall not encourage or interfere with making proselytes under any pretense whatever, nor shall any such be admitted under the jurisdiction of their congregation, until he or she or they produce legal and satisfactory credentials, from some other congregation where a regular Chief [Rabbi] or Rabbi and Hebrew Consistory is established; and, provided, he, she or they are not people of color." There is historical evidence of at least one Black Jew who was respected by the community and allowed to attended the synagogue, Billy Simmons, one of the few well-known Black Jews in Southern Jewish history. The synagogue was built by enslaved Black people. Rabbi Burton Padoll, who served as the synagogue's rabbi during the 1960s, was an outspoken activist for the rights of African Americans. Rabbi Padoll was forced to resign as rabbi after prominent members of the congregation objected to his support for the civil rights movement. Inside the synagogue, there is a mural which includes a Jewish Confederate soldier sitting with a broken sword, an artistic depiction of the Lost Cause of the Confederacy.

Like other white people in Charleston, most white Jews owned slaves. According to one study, 83% of Jewish households in Charleston owned slaves, compared to 87% of white households overall. Following the South Carolina Declaration of Secession in 1860, the white Jewish community of Charleston rallied to the support of the Confederacy. 180 Charleston Jews fought for the Confederacy.

===== Washington, D.C. =====
Racial covenants were used in real estate in Washington, D.C., between the 1920s and the 1960s to exclude Black people, Asians, Jews, and other racial and ethnic minorities from white Christian neighborhoods. White Christian neighborhoods that excluded Black and Jewish people included Chevy Chase in both Maryland and Washington, D.C. (developed by the avowed white supremacist and antisemite Francis G. Newlands) and Rock Creek Hills in Kensington. White Jewish real estate developers in D.C. began developing thriving Jewish neighborhoods in the Maryland suburbs of Montgomery County and Prince George's County, where they could be free from the antisemitic discrimination they had experienced in the city. These white Jewish real estate developers - including Sam Eig, Morris Cafritz, Jack and Abraham S. Kay, Harold Greenberg, Albert H. Small, and others - removed antisemitic language from the racial covenants but retained racist language that excluded Black people and other people of color, including Jews of color. Historically Jewish communities in Montgomery County developed in full or in part by white Jewish real estate developers include Indian Spring (Abraham S. Kay) and Franklin Knolls (Morris Cafritz) in Silver Spring, Rock Creek Forest in Chevy Chase (Sam Eig), Greenwich Forest in Bethesda (Cafritz), and Kemp Mill in Wheaton (Jack Kay and Harold Greenberg). In 1966, anti-racist Jewish socialist activists in Washington, D.C., founded Jews for Urban Justice to protest against anti-Black racism within the D.C. Jewish community.

==== Anti-Palestinianism ====
In her 1990 essay "Israel: Whose Country Is It Anyway?", the Jewish American writer Andrea Dworkin wrote that American Jews are raised with anti-Palestinian sentiment, which she describes as "a deep and real prejudice against Palestinians that amounts to race-hate."

According to a 2021 survey published by the Jewish Electorate Institute, 34% of Jewish American voters believe that "Israel's treatment of Palestinians is similar to racism in the United States", 25% believe that "Israel is an apartheid state", and 22% believe that "Israel is committing genocide against the Palestinians." 9% of Jewish American voters believed that "Israel doesn't have a right to exist", with 20% under the age of 40 agreeing. Young Jewish Americans are more likely to agree with these sentiments than older Jewish Americans.

In 2021, a group of rabbinical and cantorial students published an open letter titled "Rabbinical and Cantorial Students Appeal to the Heart of the Jewish Community". The letter compared the plight of Palestinians to that of African Americans, called for a "racial reckoning" in the Jewish American community, and denounced "racist violence" in Israel and Palestine.

==== Asian-American Jews ====
Asian-American Jews are frequently perceived as not "looking Jewish" and as a result, they may face skepticism and otherization in white Jewish spaces. Ava Rigelhaupt, a Chinese-American Jew, has written that while she "never felt unwelcome or purposefully ostracized", she never felt like she "naturally belonged" either. Yoshi Silverstein, an Asian-American Jew who founded the Mitsui Collective, had said that Asian Jews are often "forgotten about".

==== Sephardim and Mizrahim ====
When Syrian Jews first began to arrive in New York City during the late 1800s and early 1900s, Eastern European Ashkenazi Jews who lived on the Lower East Side sometimes expressed their disdain for their Syrian co-coreligionists by referring to them as Arabische Yidden, Arab Jews. Some Ashkenazim did not believe that Sephardi/Mizrahi Jews from the Middle East were really Jewish. In response, some Syrian Jews who were deeply proud of their ancient Jewish heritage, derogatorily dubbed Ashkenazi Jews "J-Dubs", a reference to the first and third letters of the English word "Jew".

== See also ==
- African American–Jewish relations
- Anti–Middle Eastern sentiment
- Anti-Palestinian racism
- Armenian genocide and the Holocaust
- Black Hebrew Israelites
- Black-Palestinian solidarity
- Far-right politics in Israel
- Groups claiming affiliation with Israelites
- The Holocaust and the Nakba
- Holocaust uniqueness debate
- Interminority racism in the United States
- Jewish anti-racism
- Jewish diaspora
- Jewish ethnic divisions
- Jewish Indian theory
- Jews as the chosen people
- Judaism and Mormonism
- Khazar hypothesis of Ashkenazi ancestry
- Nation of Islam and antisemitism
- Native American–Jewish relations
- Palestinian genocide accusation
- Racial conceptions of Jewish identity in Zionism
- Racism in Israel
- Racism in Muslim communities
- Schvartze
