= Liebeskonzil =

- Directed by: Werner Schroeter
- Release date: 1982

Liebeskonzil is a 1982 film by Werner Schroeter, based on an 1894 play by Oskar Panizza. It was banned by the Austrian government in 1985, on the grounds that it insulted the Christian religion. In 1994, in the case of Otto-Preminger-Institut v. Austria, the European Court of Human Rights held by 6 votes to 3 that the banning of the film was a justifiable limitation on the freedom of expression, because the film would offend Austrian Roman Catholics. Panzizzi's original work had also led its author to face blasphemy charges in the nineteenth century.

== Synopsis ==
As with Panizza's original play, the film depicts God as senile, Christ as intellectually disabled and the Virgin Mary as both promiscuous and firmly in charge of negotiations with Satan over the development of a new sexually transmitted infection (syphilis) to plague the non-monogamous orthodoxy of the Vatican under Pope Alexander VI (Rodrigo Borgia). Satan and Salome produce a daughter who will infect the rest of humanity.
