= Ashkenormativity =

Form of Eurocentrism in Ashkenazi Jewish culture

Ashkenormativity or Ashkecentrism refers to a form of bias and discrimination regarding Ashkenazi Jews, including the assumption that Ashkenazi religious and cultural practices are the default; in contrast to Jews of Sephardi, Mizrahi, Ethiopian, and other non-Ashkenazi backgrounds.

== Demographics ==
In 2021, Ashkenazi Jews were the majority of American Jews, with Ashkenazi Jews making up 66% of the Jewish population, with another 6% having a mixed Ashkenazi/non-Ashkenazi background (such as Sephardi or Mizrahi). 63% of all American Jews identified as non-Hispanic white Ashkenazi Jews. 1% of American Ashkenazi Jews were non-Hispanic Black, 1% were Hispanic, and 2% were mixed or of some other race (such as Asian). According to Ilana Kaufman, executive director of the Jews of Color Initiative, the "dominance of Ashkenazi heritage (associated with Central and Eastern Europe) in American Judaism can make Jews who don't share that background feel out of place in synagogues and other Jewish settings."

=== Ashkenazi Jews of color ===
According to "Understanding Antisemitism", a document produced by Jews for Racial and Economic Justice, Ashkenazi Jews of color "benefit from the normalization of Ashkenazi culture within the Jewish community." However, racism prevents Ashkenazi Jews of color from "access to the institutional power that tends to come with cultural dominance." Jewish Voice for Peace believes that many Jewish-American organizations "focus on white Ashkenazi history when discussing antisemitism" and thus erase the "existence of Ashkenazi Jews of Color" and their experiences of antisemitism. Ashkenormativity may overlap with white privilege, as many Ashkenazi Jews are white, but the terms are not synonymous as Ashkenazi Jews of color cannot benefit from white privilege and some non-Ashkenazi Jews, such as white Sephardi or white Mizrahi Jews, may benefit from white privilege.

== Definition ==
The Jewish English Lexicon dictionary defines the term as assuming Ashkenazi Jews as the default, excluding Sephardi, Mizrahi, Ethiopian, and other practices and histories from Jewish communal life. It is often contrasted with Ashkefardic, representing both Ashkenazi and Sephardi cultures.

The Newish Jewish Encyclopedia defines Ashkenormativity as the assumption that "Jewish life and culture is limited primarily to the experiences and customs of Ashkenazi Jews." The encyclopedia asserts that most American Jews, both Ashkenazi and non-Ashkenazi, have internalized Ashkenormative views due to the historical prominence of Ashkenazim within American Jewish life.

The Oxford Handbook of Jewishness and Dance defines Ashkenormativity as "an Ashkenazi, or European Jewish, centricity in relation to dominant formulations of Jewish culture".

== History ==
The term arose in Jewish discourse around 2014. According to linguist Sarah Bunin Benor, Jews discuss the term to counter the power imbalance from a time when Jewish life was Ashkenormative. The word was included in the Newish Jewish Encyclopedia in 2019.

== Examples ==
Norman Stillman, an academic in Oriental studies, wrote about the "Ashkenazification" of Sephardi religious life in Israel. Daniel J. Elazar said that "Ashkenazified" Sephardi yeshivot in Israel emulate Eastern European Ashkenazi forms of Judaism at the expense of their own Sephardi heritage, with Sephardi rabbis experiencing pressure to adapt to Ashkenazi norms.

The Jewish environmental advocacy organization Hazon, whose staff is predominantly Ashkenazi, described terms such as "Jewish looking" or "a Jewish dance" as "Yiddish-centric/Ashkenormative".

Common stereotypes about Jews, such as having pale skin or wearing black hats, are often stereotypes about Ashkenazi Jews specifically rather than Jews as a whole. These stereotypes apply to white Ashkenazim rather than Sephardi, Mizrahi, and other non-Ashkenazi Jews. Another example of Ashkenormativity is assuming that iconic aspects of Ashkenazi culture, such the Yiddish language, media such as Fiddler on the Roof or Indecent, or staples of Ashkenazi Jewish cuisine such as bagels and gefilte fish, are representative of all Jews.

Many kibbutzim in Israel are or were historically majority Ashkenazi. Lihi Yona, writing for +972 Magazine, said that the Ashkenazi-dominated kibbutz movement "contributed to the vast socio-economic gaps that characterize Israel today" because "Ashkenazim enjoy near-unadulterated privilege and access to land and natural resources, which in turn yield significant economic opportunities. Meanwhile, Mizrahi “development towns” that sprang up around them house tens of thousands of people in small, cramped geographic areas that offer little opportunities for economic advancement."

== Criticism ==
Given the dominant focus on the Hebrew language and Israeli culture within American-Jewish cultural institutions, and the de-emphasizing of Yiddish culture, Jordan Kutzik questioned the extent to which Ashkenazi Jews are culturally Ashkenazi and what Ashkenormative refers to in the American context. He further argued that the near-exclusive focus on Israeli culture was a greater threat to the maintenance of Sephardic and Mizrahi cultural traditions in America than Ashkenazi Jews choosing to study Yiddish.

Rokhl Kaffrissen has argued that the term is a misnomer when Ashkenazi culture is widely denigrated within an American Jewish society which has embraced Sephardic Hebrew pronunciation and other elements of Sephardi culture as a result of alleged self-hatred among 19th century German Jews and 20th century Zionists.

== See also ==
- Racism in Israel
- Racism in Jewish communities
- Jewish visibility
- Whiteness studies
- Anti-Yiddish sentiment
