= Jews of color =

Term for a Jew considered to be non-white

Jews of color (or Jews of colour) is a neologism, primarily used in North America, that describes Jews from non-white racial and ethnic backgrounds, whether mixed-race, adopted, Jews by conversion, or part of national or geographic populations (or a combination of these) that are non-white. It is often used to identify Jews who are racially non-white, whose family origins are originally in African, Asian or Latin American countries, and to acknowledge a common experience for Jews who belong to racial, national, or geographic groups beyond white and Ashkenazi.

The term has been used in discourse about Ashkenormativity, white Jews, and by extension white privilege, as well as racism in Jewish communities, Jewish visibility, Judaism as an ethnicity, and the question of who is a Jew. While there is consensus that this demographic group exists, there is debate over the exact definition or the use of this specific term.

== Origin of the term ==
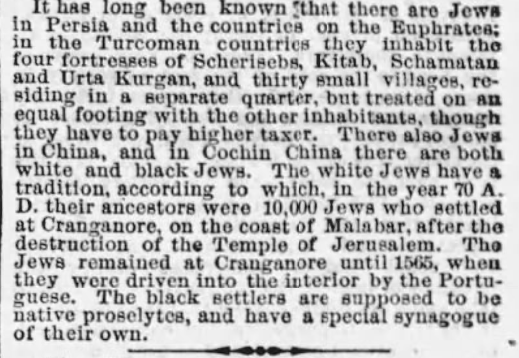
1872 article in the Baltimore Sun that mentions white Jews, Black Jews, and other non-white Jews in Iran and India.

Jews who are also people of color have existed for a long time, but the concept of a Jew of color as an identity came about in recent history. The term comes from a melding of the terms Jew and person of color, and it refers to people who identify as both (sometimes in addition to other identities). The related term "JOCISM" is occasionally used, standing for Jews of Color, Indigenous, and Mizrahim.

The Jewish diaspora contains Jews of a wide range of ethnicities, and it branches out into groups like Sephardim and Mizrahi. However, according to Jews of Color: Experiences of Inclusion and Exclusion, "Jewish identity has largely been dominated and defined by Ashkenazi Jews and their heritage, whose lineage can be traced back to Eastern and Central Europe". Sephardi and Mizrahi Jews are not always considered Jews of color, and may or may not self-identify as Jews of color. Jews of Middle Eastern and North African descent are classified as "white" by the United States census. Syrian-American Jews are classified as white by the US census and most self-identify as white, Middle Eastern, and/or otherwise non-white, but rarely identify as Jews of color. Hispanic and Latino American Jews, particularly Hispanic and Latino Ashkenazim, often identify as white rather than as Jews of color, and some Jews with roots in Latin America may not identify as "Hispanic" or "Latino" at all. Sephardi Jews of European descent, such as the Spanish and Portuguese Jews, are not considered Jews of color. Many Ashkenazi Jews in the United States are Jews of color. The majority of African-American Jews are Ashkenazi. Many Asian-American Jews are also Ashkenazi.

Due to antisemitic persecution, many Jewish people throughout history have tried to be perceived as non-Jewish members of the dominant culture of their diaspora homeland while privately performing their traditions, and may often assimilate or intermarry, in order to assure their safety. On census forms it was easier to write white than highlight an ethno-religious variation. In a post-Holocaust context where in living memory the census was used to round up Jews, it became unfavourable to highlight this if they were able to pass as non-Jews. Peers Institute asserts "as some Jews became ‘white’ in the twentieth century, large groups of non-white Jews simply disappeared, or at least disappeared as Jews".

Shahanna McKinney-Baldon is responsible for arguably the first in-print advocacy for use of the term. She introduced a 2001 issue by Bridges: A Journal for Jewish Feminists and Our Friends titled “Writing and Art by and for Jewish Women of Color”: “Using the term Jews of color can be a way to give people a chance to tell their stories, to have conversations about things like the personal and political significance of labeling oneself and being labeled, and to think critically with other people about white identity among Jews in the United States and in other places. In these ways, mindful use of the term Jews of color can be a political act. It can give people a chance to do some healing around how racism can make people of color and non-people of color feel separate from each other.".

== JoC identification ==
In recent years, journalists, scholars and Jewish community leaders have wondered about the percentage of U.S. Jews who are Jews of color. This term has not been included in Pew Research Center surveys so it is difficult to ascertain this data. The Jews of Color Field Building Initiative reported, "Jews of color in the U.S. are a growing population but have been systematically undercounted in decades of American Jewish population studies". For many years, the majority of U.S. Jews have identified as white. However, a 2020 estimate from Reformjudaism.org stated that 12% of American Jews are Jews of color. In 2021, the Jews of Color Initiative underwent the most comprehensive survey of Jews of color ever carried out entitled Beyond the Count: Perspectives and Lived Experiences of Jews. In this paper, Jews of color expressed multiple ways that their identities overlap with, intersect with, and infuse each other. In The Colors of Jews: Racial Politics and Radical Diasporism, Melanie Kaye/Kantrowitz writes that the voices of Jews of color, particularly Jews who have background or ancestry in places other than Europe "challenge common assumptions about Jewishness, whiteness, and the perennial question of who gets to decide who is Jewish".

== Intra-community relations ==
The relationship between Jews of color and white/non-POC Jews has been mixed over history. Moment Mag argues the term is evolving, "reflecting the Jewish community’s reckoning with race and its own racial blind spots". Responses from 1,100 people in the Jews of color Initiative study revealed a deep engagement with Jewish identity that has often come with experiences of discrimination in communal settings. Jewish News UK wrote "Jews of colour are made to feel unwelcome in an Ashkenormative community’". The Associated Press wrote that skin colour sometimes elicits questioning glances, suspicions and hurtful assumptions. Jews of Color: Experiences of Inclusion and Exclusion suggests "the battle of recognition and representation between Jews of Color and the dominating assumption of Jewish whiteness in the United States often produces an environment of racism and exclusion for Jewish community members of color".

Of Juneteenth 2022, Josh Maxey, head of the Jews of color group at Washington Hebrew Congregation, said the festival was "a chance for other Jews of color to come together to celebrate each other and to be themselves and not feel like we have to hide aspects of our identity". A piece from Jewish Community Relations Council on intersectionality writes "for many Jews of color, Jewish LGBTQI and Jews who are of multiple identities (including diverse political perspectives)...without the Jewish community operating in intersectional ways there is no space for them to engage as whole people". White Jews: An Intersectional Approach argues "what Whiteness “does” to Jewishness is act as an accelerant for certain forms of antisemitic marginalization even as it ratifies a racialized hierarchy within the Jewish community".

White converts to Judaism may experience white privilege that Jews of color, including converts of color, do not experience. Black converts and other converts of color may have their Jewishness questioned in majority-white Jewish spaces, while white converts are more likely to be accepted as Jewish without question. Despite the fact that the majority of Jews of color were born Jewish and have an ancestral connection to Jewishness, Jews of color, particularly black Jews, are often automatically assumed or suspected to be converts. White Jews are often assumed to have been born Jewish with Jewish ancestry; this is true even of white converts, many of whom have no ancestral connection to Jewishness. In majority-white Jewish spaces, Jews of color may face intrusive questions asking them how they are Jewish or if they are really Jewish at all. Jews of color in majority-white Jewish spaces may be assumed to be janitorial staff or experience harassment from security.

In June 2020, the Board of Deputies of British Jews established a Commission on Racial Inclusivity in light of the George Floyd protests in the United Kingdom. The Commission declared "a need for the Jewish community to become an unequivocally anti-racist environment that is more welcoming and inclusive to black Jews, and non-black Jews of color."

== Criticism of the use of the term ==
In their article Navigating Nuance: Using the Term "Jews of Color", the Jews of Color Initiative notes that thought leaders and research participants who are Jews of color have expressed limitations for employing this term. The research term behind the Beyond the Count paper described it as "an imperfect but useful umbrella term."

For instance, those who participated in the Beyond the Count research and self-identified as JoC used the term in a multiplicity of ways:

- As a racial grouping (e.g. Black, Asian, and multiracial Jews)
- To indicate national heritage (e.g. Egyptian, Iranian, and Ethiopian Jews)
- To describe regional and geographic connections (e.g. Latino, Mizrahi, Sephardic Jews)
- To specify sub-categories (e.g. transracially adopted Jews and Jewish women of color)

eJewish Philanthropy criticized the use of the term "Jews of color", arguing that it doesn’t accurately describe the people to whom it refers.

== See also ==
- Abayudaya, Jewish community that lives in the East African nation of Uganda
- African American–Jewish relations
- African-American Jews
- Beta Israel, also known as Ethiopian Jews
- Black Judaism
- Cochin Jews or Malabar Jews, community of Indian Jews
- East Asian Jews
- Eastern Sephardim — see "Neo-Western Sephardim"
- Groups claiming affiliation with Israelites
- History of the Jews in Africa
- House of Israel (Ghana), Jewish community that lives in Ghana
- Igbo Jews, Jewish community that lives in the West African nation of Nigeria
- Jewish anti-racism
- Jewish–Romani relations
- Lemba people, community possibly of Jewish descent, some members of it have formally converted to Judaism, that lives in Western and Southern Africa
- Native American–Jewish relations
- Racism in Israel
- Racism in Jewish communities
