= Native American–Jewish relations =

Native Americans and Jewish Americans have interacted throughout much of the history of the United States, beginning with the arrival of European Jews in North America in the 17th century. As the Naturalization Act of 1790 limited naturalization to "free white persons", European Jews were allowed to settle in the United States and become citizens due to being legally classified as white. A small number of American Jews acquired ownership of Indigenous land during the 1800s and early 1900s, following the passage of the Homestead Acts. While early Jewish immigrants often behaved like other settlers in their relationship to Native Americans, later generations of American Jews felt a greater level of sympathy for Native American rights. A small but significant number of scholars and lawyers between the 1930s and 1950s who defended the rights of Native Americans were Jewish, most notably Felix S. Cohen and Lucy Kramer Cohen, Department of the Interior officials who drew parallels between the suffering of Native Americans and that of German Jews and who were among the primary legal architects of the Indian Reorganization Act of 1934. The Religious Action Center of Reform Judaism has stated that "Jews and American Indians have much in common", citing similar concerns and challenges regarding assimilation, religious rights, and preserving cultural heritage.

== History ==
Key books detailing the history of Jewish-Native relations in the United States include Jews Among the Indians: Tales of Adventure and Conflict in the Old West by M.L. Marks, Members of the Tribe: Native America in the Jewish Imagination by Rachel Rubinstein, and The Jews’ Indian: Colonialism, Pluralism, and Belonging in America by David S. Koffman.

In 1683, William Penn described the physical appearance of Native Americans by saying that they have similar eyes to Jewish people, writing that "Their Eye is little and black, not unlike a straighy-look't Jew."

=== 17th to 19th centuries ===
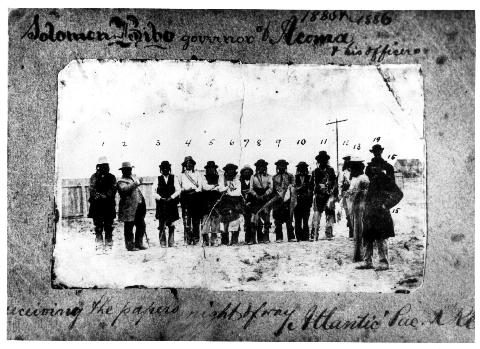
This 1885 photo is listed as "Solomon Bibo governor of Acoma & his officers 1885 - 1886". Solomon is marked as #15.

According to University of Toronto professor David S. Koffman, writer of The Jews' Indian, American Jewish history is "part of the process of colonialism" and the emigration of European, North African, and Middle Eastern Jews to newly founded settler-colonial states such as the United States is "the story of modern Jewish life". Koffman claims that European Jews have been both victims of colonialism in Europe and perpetrators of colonialism in North America.

The United States Constitution of 1789 and the Naturalization Act of 1790 do not mention Jews. European Jews, like other Europeans, were classified as "free white citizens" under the law. Under law, white Jews were understood to be different from white Christians primarily due to religious belief and religious practice.

In 1822, the Moroccan-born Sephardic Jewish businessman and social reformer Moses Elias Levy established a Jewish settlement called Pilgrimage Plantation near what is now Micanopy, Florida. The intent of the settlement was to provide a safe haven for Jewish refugees from Europe. The settlement was damaged by fire in December 1835 by the Seminole during the Second Seminole War. The Seminole burned a sugar house on the plantation and its contents. The plantation was then abandoned and some of the property was moved to another location, which the Seminole threatened to destroy, so the property was destroyed to prevent the Seminole from claiming it. Levy later filed a claim with the government for its value, but the government decided against compensating him.

A small number of Jews, mostly from Germany, participated in the settlement of the American frontier. The 2022 documentary "Jews of the Wild West", chronicles the history of Jewish pioneers and was made in consultation with Jewish and Native advisors to ensure historical accuracy and sensitivity.

The Prussian-born Jewish trader Solomon Bibo, who became a colonial governor of the Acoma Pueblo, married the Acoma Pueblo woman Juana Valle and she converted to Judaism. Descendants of Solomon and Juana live in New Mexico.

=== 20th and 21st centuries ===
As early as the 1890s, some American Jews were active in supporting the rights and equal status of Native Americans. However, instances were few and isolated. During the New Deal era, Jewish support for Native American rights became more organized and visible. Jewish civil servants, lawyers, educators, social scientists, and anthropologists advocated for Native Americans, including a handful of influential Jewish legal scholars who helped shape the Indian New Deal. In 1973, when citizens of the Oglala Sioux Tribe were jailed following the Wounded Knee Occupation, the majority of the lawyers representing the Oglala prisoners were Jewish. During the Dakota Access Pipeline protests in 2016, nine rabbis, rabbinical students and Jewish community members were arrested as an act of civil disobedience during a rally put on by Jewish Voice for Peace in Philadelphia. Rabbi Alissa Wise, Jewish Voice for Peace deputy director, who was arrested during the protests, said, "As Jews who have experienced displacement in our own histories and who are dedicated to justice for the Palestinian people who have been displaced and erased due to the policies of the Israeli state, it is important for us to be here today to honor indigenous sovereignty, and to confront what it means to live on stolen land".

The Coushatta Tribe of Louisiana maintains close ties with the State of Israel and celebrates Israel's Independence Day. The Coushatta Tribe has stated a sense of solidarity with Jews due to similar histories of prejudice, discrimination, ethnic cleansing, and persecution.

Kevin Gover (Pawnee Nation), the director of the National Museum of the American Indian, has discussed the relationship between Native and Jewish Americans. Gover has mentioned witnessing antisemitism while growing up in Oklahoma and notes "shared goals and challenges" face by Jewish and Indigenous communities. Gover believes that "what happened to Indians very closely resembles Jews in Europe during World War II. Everything from systematic killing—the hunting of them and their murder—to the use of propaganda to fire up the public to engage in that sort of conduct" and therefore studying the Holocaust is important to understanding Indigenous genocide. Gover has also noted that many of the lawyers representing Native American tribes between the 1930s and 1950 were Jewish Americans at a time "when it wasn't a popular thing to do". However, Gover has also recommended caution in conflating the Holocaust with the Native American experience, claiming that Native American genocide was not "mechanized, systematic killing" in the same way as the Holocaust and that the "greatest killer of Indians" was depopulation due to disease.

== Antisemitism ==
Elwood Towner (Hupa) was a mixed-race Native American lawyer from Oregon. He was also an antisemitic and pro-Nazi speaker during the 1930s in the Northwestern United States with ties to the German American Bund.

David Ahenakew was a Canadian First Nations (Cree) politician, and former National Chief of the Assembly of First Nations who was the subject of numerous court cases in 2002 after making a number of antisemitic remarks to reporters, including accusing Jews of starting World War II. His Order of Canada membership was revoked and he was charged with promoting hatred after repeating his remarks to a reporter; his initial conviction was later overturned in a second trial. In an interview in the July/August 2003 edition of This Magazine, Ahenakew expressed to reporter Alex Roslin his dissatisfaction with what he called "racial control" of the media, saying that "when a group of people, a race of people, control the world media, something has to be done about it." The article also quotes claims that Ahenakew had long held racist beliefs against Jews, Black people and other ethnic groups, and that those beliefs had been hidden from the public.

== Indian Jewish theory ==
From the fifteenth to the nineteenth century, Jewish Indian theory was the erroneous idea that some or all of the lost tribes of Israel had travelled to the Americas and that all or some of the Indigenous peoples of the Americas are of Israelite descent or were influenced by still-lost Jewish populations.

== Views of Jewish denominations ==
=== Conservative Judaism ===
The Rabbinical Assembly of the Conservative Jewish movement referred to the persecution of American Jews as well as the "brutally oppressive treatment of Native Americans" as among the "lowest moments" in American history in a statement demanding that the Trump administration fire Stephen Miller for allegedly supporting "white supremacist ideology".

=== Reconstructionist Judaism ===
The Reconstructionist movement has created a Tisha B'Av curriculum based around reparations for Native Americans and African Americans.

The Reconstructionist rabbis Jessica Rosenberg and Mackenzie (Max) Reynolds have said that the American ideal of religious freedom "gave European Jews space to settle in the Americas alongside other white European settlers...as white citizens." They further state that white Jewish people were never treated as equal to white Christians due to antisemitism, but "were certainly not considered black or Native Americans on this land" and thus had access to a relative level of white privilege.

=== Reform Judaism ===
The Union for Reform Judaism, the largest Jewish denomination in the United States, has issued two resolutions concerning the Indigenous peoples of North America, and the Reform movement's Central Conference of American Rabbis (CCAR) has issued three. A 1977 resolution from the Union for Reform Judaism says that "As Jews, with our own history as victims of discrimination, we should be particularly sensitive to the plight of the American Indians." The resolution also encouraged Canadian Jews and Jews in other settler-colonial countries to reckon with First Nations and Indigenous issues. A 2013 resolution addressed First Nations issues.

In 1990, the CCAR issued a resolution calling for the protection and repatriation of Native American remains. The resolution states that American Jews should be especially sensitive to these issues given the importance of respect for the dead and proper burial of the dead within Jewish tradition and Jewish law.

== Native American Jews ==
According to a 2020 Pew Survey, less than 1% of non-Hispanic American Jews are Native American and less than 1% are mixed Native American and white. Many Americans may not be aware that Native American Jews exist. Native American Jews experience both anti-Indigenous racism and antisemitism, including racism from white and non-Native Jews as well as antisemitism from non-Jewish Native Americans.

During the 1930s, the Jewish population of Alaska was small with only around 100 people. A number of Jewish men in Alaska were married to Inuit women.

=== Notable Native American Jews ===
- Winona LaDuke (White Earth Band), economist, environmentalist, and writer
- Raquel Montoya-Lewis (Pueblo of Isleta), attorney and jurist
- Sandy Cohen (Oneida Nation of Wisconsin) professional basketball player
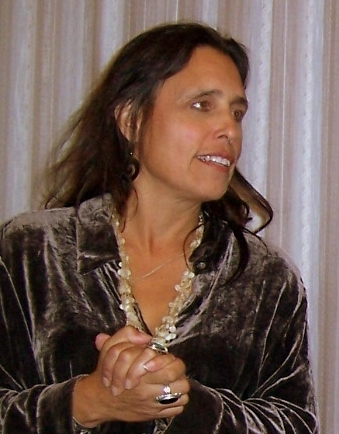
Winona LaDuke in 2009.

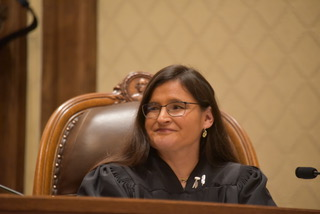
Raquel Montoya-Lewis in 2020.

== See also ==
- African American–Jewish relations
- Black Indians in the United States
- Indigeneity in the Israeli-Palestinian conflict
- Jewish anti-racism
- Jewish–Romani relations
- Jews and Thanksgiving
- Jews of color
- Morris Edward Opler
- Native American and Irish interactions
- Northern Cherokee Nation of the Old Louisiana Territory
