= July 2019 Ethiopian Jews protest in Israel =

Anti-police brutality protest

July 2019 Ethiopian Jews protest
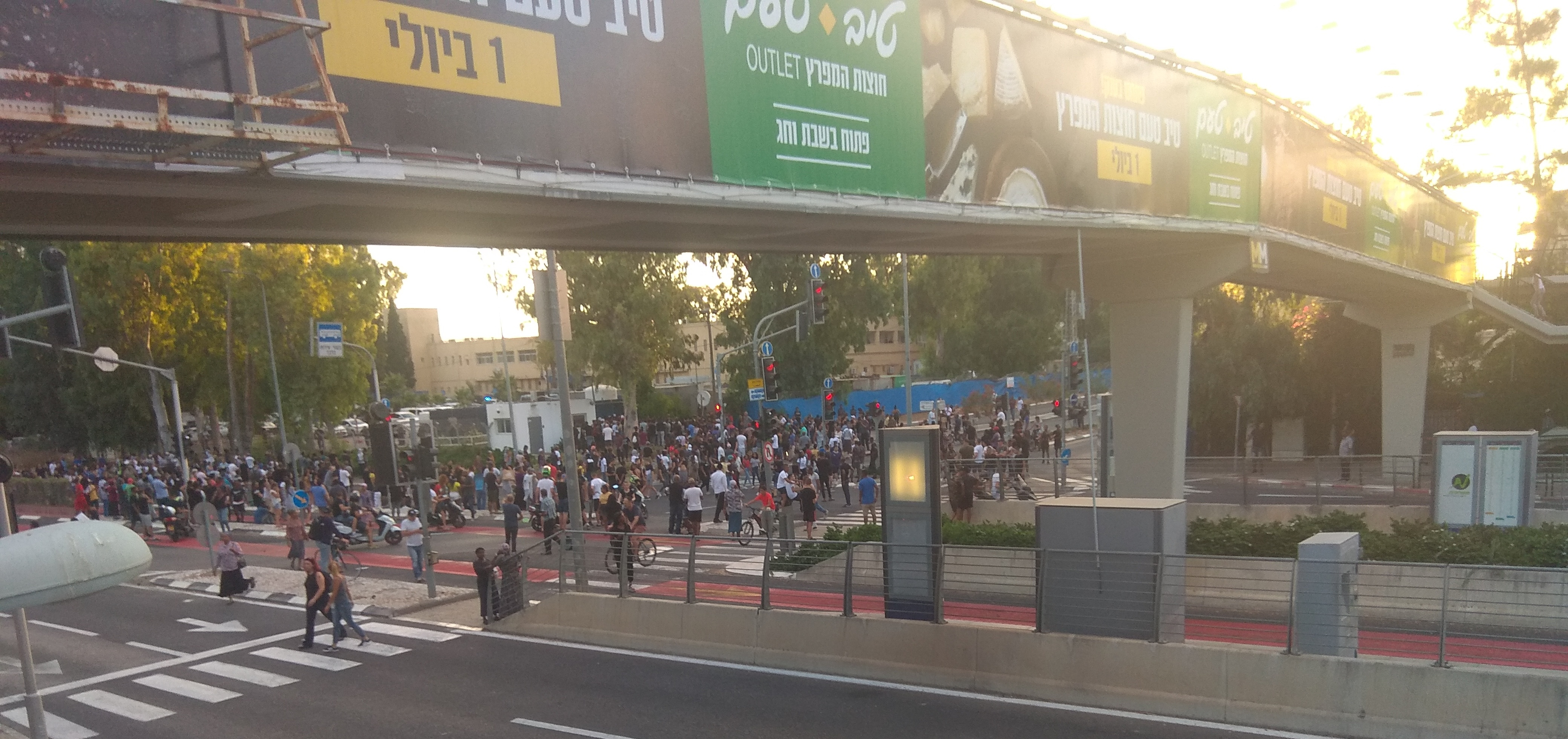
- Protest of Ethiopian Israelis on 3 July 2019
- Date: July 2019
- Location: Israel
- Caused by: Killing of a young Ethiopian-Israeli by police officer
- Goals: To stop police brutality against the Ethiopian Israeli community
- Methods: Demonstrations, civil disobedience, civil resistance, sit-ins, self-immolations
- Status: Ended

Casualties and losses
26 injured, 130 arrested	111 police officers injured

The July 2019 Ethiopian Jews protest in Israel was a period of unrest initiated by Ethiopian Jews in response to the shooting death of 18-year-old Solomon Teka at the hands of an Israeli police officer in Kiryat Haim, Haifa.

Tens of thousands of Ethiopian Jewish protesters clashed with Israeli police and blocked at least 15 intersections across Israel, while thousands of people were stuck in traffic congestion. According to police, the clashes between protesters and police caused a total of at least 110 officers and 26 rioters getting injured, and at least 130 demonstrators getting arrested.

At first the police did not act firmly against the protesters. A few hours later, after recognizing that events were spiraling out of control, they began to employ riot dispersal methods, including the use of tear gas and stun grenades. Teka's family made a request to the demonstrators to stop protesting out of respect to the shiva (mourning period), which began immediately after their son's funeral on 3 July, and the protests were put on hold. However, three days later, Ethiopian community leaders decided to restart nationwide demonstrations.

== Background ==
Israel's Ethiopian Jewish community numbers around 140,000 people out of Israel's 9 million citizens, with more than 50,000 being born in the country. Although the community had been cut off from the Jewish world for centuries, they were recognized as Jews by Israeli religious authorities. The government worked to move 80,000 Ethiopians to Israel in the 1980s and 1990s.

While many Ethiopians have integrated well into Israeli society, with many serving in the Israel Defense Forces (IDF) and police, and others in sports, politics or entertainment, there is still widespread poverty, lack of opportunity and routine police harassment. Many have expressed feelings of being subjected to systemic bias, being considered second-class citizens, or having to constantly worry about police harassment due to their skin colour. According to Israeli media reports, 11 Ethiopians have been killed by police since 1997. Many African migrants and refugees living in Israel have stated that they too have felt anger against the state.

In 2015, a video clip showing Ethiopian-Israeli soldier Damas Pakada being beaten by policemen set off protests that lasted for ten days. The protests turned into violent demonstrations, with the Israeli police using tear gas against the demonstrators, resulting in 7 protesters and at least 50 officers getting injured. One protester told the BBC, "We are not prepared to wait any longer to be recognized as equal citizens. It may take a few months but it will happen." Although Pakada, an IDF soldier working in a cyber unit, believed the incident to have been motivated by racism, the court case closed without significant punishment being leveled against the defendants.

In another case, on 18 January 2019, a 24-year-old Ethiopian-Israeli named Yehuda Biadga was killed by police officers, who said that he was holding a knife. His family stated that he was suffering from mental illness, and had not taken his medications when he was shot by police. Thousands of protesters took to the streets of Tel Aviv after Biadga's killing. Incidents of Ethiopian community members rising up in protest against police brutality and racism had happened before, but the killing of an 18-year-old Ethiopian in a park would soon reignite tensions.

== Incident ==
On the evening of 30 June 2019, an off-duty police officer in Kiryat Haim, a neighborhood in the northern part of the city of Haifa, had gone on an outing with his wife and three small children to a playground. While there, he noticed some teens beating up a younger boy. The officer entered the fight scene and tried to break it up. Among the youths was Solomon Teka, an Ethiopian-Israeli who was born and grew up in Gondar, Ethiopia and moved with his family to Israel around 2013, when he was 12. The officer identified himself, and the youths began to throw stones at him. According to the police statement, the officer felt his life was in danger, prompting him to use his gun against the attackers, firing a warning shot that he said was fired at the ground, but instead ricocheted and hit Teka, who was killed. The other youths and a local witness later claimed that the policeman was not being attacked, and that he just started shooting at the youths who had gathered at the playground.

Teka's funeral took place on 3 July.

On 17 July, Channel 12 reported that medical examiners had found a quantity of alcohol in Teka's body "at twice the level of a drunk person", along with traces of hashish. "An expert in the field" who was consulted stated that "the combination of the two can lead to recklessness and trigger violent behaviour." The family's attorney dismissed the report as another attempt to smear Teka's name and justify his killing—in effect killing him twice.

On 4 February 2020, the police officer, whose name remained under gag order, was indicted by state prosecutors for negligent homicide. Prosecutors said the officer had been in danger - but not life-threatening danger. Therefore, firing a warning shot near Teka's feet instead of into the air violated regulations and negligently caused Teka's death.

On 2 April 2024, the police officer was found not guilty. The judge explained that 4 of the stones had both Teka's and the officer's blood on them, and that the medical expert had ruled the stone that hit the officer on the back of his neck could have killed him. The judge stated that his life was endangered by Teka, that the warning shot he fired was a reasonable action, and that he acted in self-defense.

== Protests ==
At least 130 demonstrators arrested during the Ethiopian Jews protest in Israel

Tens of thousands of angry Ethiopian protesters clashed with Israeli police and blocked at least 15 highways across Israel

In the wake of the killing, thousands of Ethiopian Jews rioted and staged protests in several Israeli cities beginning on 2 July. Dozens of protesters blocked traffic at main highways in Haifa. Video footage showed numerous cars on fire, and other footage showed protesters jumping on a car and trying to break its windows. While many protesters were calm, others were violent, with some destroying what appeared to be police cars. In one video, many people are seen joining together to flip a car over and to set fires in the street as they are screaming "End the killing, and end the racism." Approximately 200 demonstrators took to the streets of Afula, where they blocked traffic at a main intersection. Meanwhile, demonstrators created makeshift roadblocks in important intersections in several major Israeli cities, including Tel Aviv and Haifa, by burning tires in them. Some 50,000 people were stuck in traffic across Israel as the result of the blocking of 15 of these major intersections by protesters.

Teka's family asked the demonstrators to stop protesting and wait till the end of the seven-day shiva (mourning period), and on 3 July the protests were placed on hold. But three days later, Ethiopian community leaders held a Saturday meeting and decided to restart the demonstrations. Israel police commissioner Moti Cohen, while calling the protesters "lawbreakers", sent a message to all Israeli police officers asking them to exercise restraint ahead of any new wave of protests. The police initially allowed protesters to block some roads, and tried to avoid any direct confrontations with them. But when updated information about the number of injured officers reached supervisors, it was announced that they would start clamping down on the protesters. Eventually, the police started using force to clear the blocked roads, while simultaneously employing a tactic of negotiations with leaders of the community. Utilising a variety of riot dispersal methods at their disposal, including tear gas and stun grenades, police began to overpower the rioters. Nonetheless, in the Haifa suburb of Kiryat Ata a mass of over one thousand people converged on a police station, where some of the protesters managed to hurl smoke grenades into the building.

Police said they arrested a total of more than 130 protesters, and that more than 110 officers were injured in the clashes. Among the hundreds of marchers many chanted, "There's no difference from blood to blood. We're all human beings." Some referenced slogans of the U.S. Black Lives Matter movement, chanting, "I can't breathe." One 26 year old protester told Agence France-Presse (AFP):

We'll do whatever we can to make sure police will stop killing people because of their skin colour...We don't know if this is going to happen again or not, but we need confidence that the state or police give us guarantees it won't.

Israel's emergency medical corps Magen David Adom (MDA) reported that some of the people who were stuck in traffic due to the roads blocked by protesters needed help and medicine. During the operations, six MDA ambulances were damaged by stone-throwing rioters, as were four MDA motorcycles and a mobile intensive care unit. Emergency services said that they treated 50 people with injuries, including protesters, police officers and even random drivers caught in the traffic jams created by the blockades. Police spokesman Micky Rosenfeld stated that the protesters were attacking both police officers and civilians. He added that the police officer in question was placed under house arrest, and that an investigation by the Justice Ministry had commenced. An Israeli judge proposed a seven-day investigation into the Teka case.

== Reactions ==
Amir Peretz, winner of the primary for the leadership of the Israeli Labor Party on 2 July, postponed his victory celebration due to the protests. He said, "I've decided not to hold my victory celebration in light of the deep rift [in Israeli society] that is being intensified in front of our very eyes and the protest of the Ethiopian community. This outburst expresses the sense of discrimination they have been carrying for many years. Tomorrow we'll do everything that is required to reunite the party and make it a political home for every Israeli."

In a video statement, Prime Minister Benjamin Netanyahu said, "We're all mourning the tragic death of the youth Solomon Teka... I know that there are problems that need to be solved. We have worked hard and need to work more to solve them. But I ask of you one thing: Stop blocking the roads. We are a nation of law, we will not tolerate the blocking of roads... I ask you, let's solve the problems together while upholding the law."

Minister Gilad Erdan, the Israeli Public Security minister, expressed his sorrow at Teka's killing and reiterated the Ethiopians' right to demonstrate non-violently, saying "We will fight for the rights of people to protest...but we will not tolerate anarchy and we will not tolerate a major hit to the public order." He stressed that there had been a 21% drop in the arrest rate of Ethiopians, adding "The terrible incident in Kiryat Haim does not represent the processes that the Israeli police has undergone...The protest of the community is legitimate, but every democratic protest has limits that must not be crossed and that the police cannot ignore".

Reuven Rivlin, Israel's President, appealed to the protesters for calm, saying "I ask all of us to act responsibly and with moderation. I know that you are doing everything in your power to convey the voice of your protest and to lead a change that is all about righting wrongs and creating a better future. No one wants revenge... We must all be partners in this process. We have no other choice. We have no other home... This is not a civil war."

Israeli Police Commissioner, Moti Cohen, called the protesters "lawbreakers" and said, "There is the law and there is a way to protest. Along with the rights of the demonstrators, there is an obligation to uphold the rights of the public and the citizens. There is no place for attacks on representatives of the government, on institutions, or against property, and there is certainly no place for unchecked rampaging.

Solomon's father, Workah (David) Teka supported the protests but appealed for calm, saying "I want to thank the Israeli people for their support of us. I'm asking the demonstrators not to use violence, and I am calling on the police to behave with restraint and tolerance. I can't have my son back, but we want there to be a fair trial and a just legal system. Let my son be the last, and no more children be killed."

Solomon's cousin, Amir Teka stated his opinion that his cousin was murdered, not killed. He pointed out that Solomon had not been hit by a car or killed in a work accident, but rather had been shot to death.

== See also ==
- 2011 Israeli social justice protests
- Protest Against Conscription of Yeshiva Students
