= Ethnic plastic surgery =

Plastic surgery to change ethnic appearance

Ethnic plastic surgery, or ethnic modification, refers to the types of plastic surgery performed frequently due to certain racial or ethnic traits, or with the intention of making one's appearance more similar or less similar to people of a particular race or ethnicity.

== Psychosocial aspects ==
Michael Jackson's plastic surgery has been discussed in the context of ethnic plastic surgery. In her book, Venus Envy: A History of Cosmetic Surgery, Elizabeth Haiken devotes a chapter to "The Michael Jackson Factor" presenting "Black, Asian, and Jewish women who seek WASP noses and Playboy breasts. They are caught in the vexed immigrants' dilemma of struggling not only to keep up with the Joneses but to look like them, too."

== Common forms ==
=== East Asian blepharoplasty ===
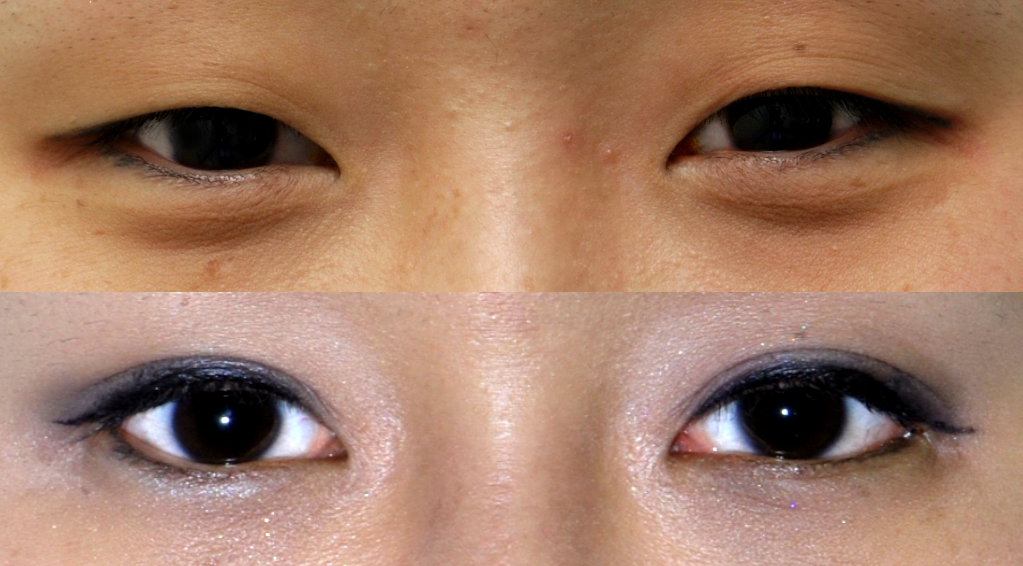
A South Korean woman, before (above) and after (below) undergoing East Asian blepharoplasty

Blepharoplasty is very commonly performed on people of Asian or Pacific island descent living in the United States representing over 11% of all blepharoplasties performed in the United States in 2020. East Asian blepharoplasty is commonly referred to 'double-eyelid surgery'. It is the most commonly performed surgery in both Japan and Taiwan. People reported as having higher levels of media exposure, lower self-esteem, and negative stereotypes related to eye shape have been shown to have lower rates of post-operative satisfaction.

=== Rhinoplasty ===
Rhinoplasty is commonly performed on African, Asian and Hispanic-descendant individuals in the United States and may be motivated or influenced by western standards of beauty however, there has been a recent focus on ethnic-conscious rhinoplasties designed to provide desired outcomes while preserving perceived ethnic characteristics, which has been demonstrated to provide increased patient satisfaction in non-white individuals and a lower rate of surgical complications graft-associated techniques are commonly instrumented for African or Hispanic descendant individuals.

== Trends ==
Cosmetic and aesthetic procedures by ethnic minority and non-White people living in the United States have been increasing at an average rate of 10% per year compared to their population growth of 2% per year.

== See also ==
- Allophilia
- Good hair
- Health and appearance of Michael Jackson
- Oli London
- The Operated Jew
- Passing (racial identity)
- Skin whitening
