= Jews of Color Initiative =

American non-profit organization

- Founded: 2017; 9 years ago
- Type: Nonprofit
- Headquarters: Berkeley, California
- Chief Executive Officer: Ilana Kaufman

Jews of Color Initiative (JOCI) is an American non-profit organization supporting the United States based multiracial, multiethnic Jewish community. Based in Berkeley, California, the organization focuses primarily on grant-making, capacity building, research and convening.

== History ==
The Jews of Color Initiative was founded by Ilana Kaufman in 2017 in Berkeley, California. JOCI was originally named the Jews of Color Field Building Initiative.

In 2021, Steven Spielberg donated $200,000 to JOCI. Spielberg's donation came from his Genesis Prize earnings.

In 2022, the Jews of Color Initiative helped launch a New York City chapter of Kamochah, an organization for Black Orthodox Jews.

== See also ==
- African-American Jews
- Jews of color
- Racism in Jewish communities
