= David Chidester =

American-born South African scholar of religion (born 1952)

- Born: David Shane Chidester; October 31, 1952 (age 73)
- Occupations: Scholar of religion; academic
- Years active: Late 20th–early 21st century
- Title: Emeritus Professor of Religious Studies, University of Cape Town
- Awards: American Academy of Religion Award for Excellence in Religious Studies; Alan J. Pifer Award; National Research Foundation A-rating; UCT Book Award

Academic background
- Education: University of California, Santa Barbara
- Thesis: Word and Light: Perception and Symbolic Forms in the Augustinian Tradition (1981)

Academic work
- Discipline: Religious studies
- Sub-discipline: Comparative religion; religion in South Africa; religion and popular culture
- Institutions: University of Cape Town
- Main interests: Comparative religion; colonialism and religion; African indigenous religion
- Notable works: Salvation and Suicide; Savage Systems; Authentic Fakes; Wild Religion; Empire of Religion; Religion: Material Dynamics

David Chidester (born 31 October 1952) is an American-born South African scholar of religion and emeritus professor of religious studies at the University of Cape Town (UCT). He is known for his work on comparative religion, African indigenous religions, American popular culture, and the history and theory of religious studies, often from postcolonial and materialist perspectives. He has authored or edited more than twenty books, including Salvation and Suicide, Patterns of Transcendence, Religions of South Africa, Savage Systems, Authentic Fakes, Wild Religion, Empire of Religion, and Religion: Material Dynamics.

Chidester has twice received the American Academy of Religion's Award for Excellence in the Study of Religion, has been rated an "A"-rated researcher by South Africa's National Research Foundation, and has won UCT's Alan J. Pifer Award for social research and the UCT Book Award on more than one occasion.

== Early life and education ==
Chidester was born on 31 October 1952. He grew up in the United States and has described himself as a "Californian" whose opposition to the Vietnam War led him to reconsider his options and turn to higher education. An introductory course in religious studies at a community college sparked his interest in the academic study of religion.

He went on to study religious studies at the University of California, Santa Barbara (UCSB), where he completed his master's degree and doctorate in the history and comparative study of religion in the 1970s. During this time he developed interests in the phenomenology of religion, religion and politics in the United States, and theories of religious language and discourse.

== Academic career ==
After teaching at UCSB, Chidester relocated to South Africa in the mid-1980s, where he began teaching comparative religious studies at the University of Cape Town. He became professor of religious studies and director of the Institute for Comparative Religion in Southern Africa (ICRSA) at UCT, positions he held for many years. Under his direction, ICRSA fostered comparative, postcolonial, and interdisciplinary work on religion in southern Africa.

Beyond the university, Chidester has served as special adviser to the South African Minister of Education, as a visiting fellow with the Human Sciences Research Council, and as a director of the Africa Genome Education Institute. He contributed to policy debates about religion in public education and helped frame options for religion education in post-apartheid South Africa.

On his retirement from UCT, the Journal for the Study of Religion published a Festschrift titled Materializing Religion: Essays in Honor of David Chidester (2018), highlighting his influence on religious studies in South Africa and internationally.

== Research and contributions ==
=== Jonestown, violence, and death ===
Chidester's early work examined the intersections of religion, ethics, and politics in contemporary societies. Patterns of Action: Religion and Ethics in a Comparative Perspective (1987) and Patterns of Power: Religion and Politics in American Culture (1988) explored religious dimensions of ethical decision-making and political conflict in the United States.

His book Salvation and Suicide: An Interpretation of Jim Jones, the Peoples Temple, and Jonestown (1988; rev. ed. 2003) offered a comparative analysis of Jonestown and the Peoples Temple movement, situating the 1978 mass murder-suicide within broader patterns of American religious history and utopianism. The book received the American Academy of Religion Award for Excellence in Religious Studies and has been widely cited in scholarship on new religious movements and violence.

In Patterns of Transcendence: Religion, Death, and Dying (1990), Chidester surveyed religious attitudes to death and dying across traditions, developing a typology of "patterns of transcendence" (ancestral, experiential, cultural, and mythic) that has been used in comparative work on death rituals.

Shots in the Streets: Violence and Religion in South Africa (1991) analysed apartheid-era violence and state ideology as forms of "political religion", examining how myths, symbols, and rituals legitimised and contested the apartheid order. The book received a UCT Book Award.

=== Religion in South Africa ===
After moving to South Africa, Chidester became a central figure in the study of religion in the region. Religions of South Africa (1992) provided a comparative overview of Christian, African indigenous, and other religious traditions in South Africa, placing them within the country's social and political history.

With colleagues, he produced a series of annotated bibliographies on Christianity and other religious traditions in South Africa, helping to map the field for future research. He also co-edited volumes on religion, politics, and social cohesion in post-apartheid South Africa, including Religion, Politics, and Identity in a Changing South Africa and What Holds Us Together: Social Cohesion in South Africa.

=== Colonialism, comparative religion, and empire ===
In Savage Systems: Colonialism and Comparative Religion in Southern Africa (1996), Chidester offered a critical history of how European travellers, missionaries, and scholars constructed African religions as "savage" in the nineteenth and early twentieth centuries, arguing that the comparative study of religion was deeply entangled with colonial power. The book received an AAR Award for Excellence in Religious Studies and has been influential in postcolonial critiques of religious studies.

His later work Empire of Religion: Imperialism and Comparative Religion (2014) extended this analysis by tracing how modern comparative religion emerged in nineteenth-century Britain in connection with imperial expansion, particularly in southern Africa. The book argues that race, rather than theology, was central to the formation of the field. Empire of Religion won the UCT Book Award and was discussed as a significant contribution to the decolonisation of religious studies.

=== Religion, popular culture, and materiality ===
Chidester has been a prominent voice in the "material turn" in religious studies, arguing that religion should be approached through material practices, bodies, spaces, and objects rather than only through beliefs. His essay "Material Terms for the Study of Religion" (2000) and later work developed key concepts for a materialist analysis of religion.

Authentic Fakes: Religion and American Popular Culture (2005) examined how baseball, Coca-Cola, Tupperware, Ronald Reagan, Jim Jones, McDonald's, Disney, and other elements of American popular culture function as "authentic fakes" that do real religious work.

In Wild Religion: Tracking the Sacred in South Africa (2012), Chidester analysed religious creativity in post-apartheid South Africa, from heritage and reconciliation rituals to prison gangs, neo-shamans, Zulu cultural performances, and the 2010 FIFA World Cup in South Africa. The book has been used as a case study in discussions of indigenous religion, media, and public religion in South Africa.

Religion: Material Dynamics (2018) collects and reworks a series of essays around key "material" concepts in the study of religion (categories, formations, and circulations) offering a synthesis of Chidester's approach to religion as a material and political practice.

== Honours and recognition ==
In 2005 Chidester was rated an "A"-rated researcher by South Africa's National Research Foundation. He has received the American Academy of Religion's Award for Excellence in Religious Studies twice, for Salvation and Suicide and Savage Systems.

At UCT he received the Alan J. Pifer Award in 2004 for outstanding welfare-related research and has been awarded the UCT Book Award at least twice, for Shots in the Streets and Empire of Religion. In 2018 the Journal for the Study of Religion devoted a special issue, Materializing Religion: Essays in Honor of David Chidester, to his work.

== Selected works ==
=== Monographs ===
- Salvation and Suicide: An Interpretation of Jim Jones, the Peoples Temple, and Jonestown (Indiana University Press, 1988; rev. ed. 2003).
- Patterns of Transcendence: Religion, Death, and Dying (Wadsworth, 1990).
- Shots in the Streets: Violence and Religion in South Africa (Beacon Press, 1991).
- Religions of South Africa (Routledge, 1992).
- Savage Systems: Colonialism and Comparative Religion in Southern Africa (University Press of Virginia, 1996).
- Christianity: A Global History (HarperSanFrancisco, 2000).
- Authentic Fakes: Religion and American Popular Culture (University of California Press, 2005).
- Wild Religion: Tracking the Sacred in South Africa (University of California Press, 2012).
- Empire of Religion: Imperialism and Comparative Religion (University of Chicago Press, 2014).
- Religion: Material Dynamics (University of California Press, 2018).

=== Edited volumes ===
- American Sacred Space (co-edited with Edward T. Linenthal, Indiana University Press, 1995).
- Nelson Mandela: From Freedom to the Future – Tributes and Speeches (co-edited with Kader Asmal and Wilmot James, Jonathan Ball, 2003).
- South Africa's Nobel Laureates: Peace, Literature and Science (co-edited with Kader Asmal and Wilmot James, Jonathan Ball, 2004).
- Religion, Politics, and Identity in a Changing South Africa (co-edited with Abdulkader Tayob and Wolfram Weisse, Waxmann, 2004).
- What Holds Us Together: Social Cohesion in South Africa (co-edited with Phillip Dexter and Wilmot James, Human Sciences Research Council, 2004).

== See also ==
- Comparative religion
- Religious studies
- Religion in South Africa
