= Jewish nose =

Ethnic stereotype

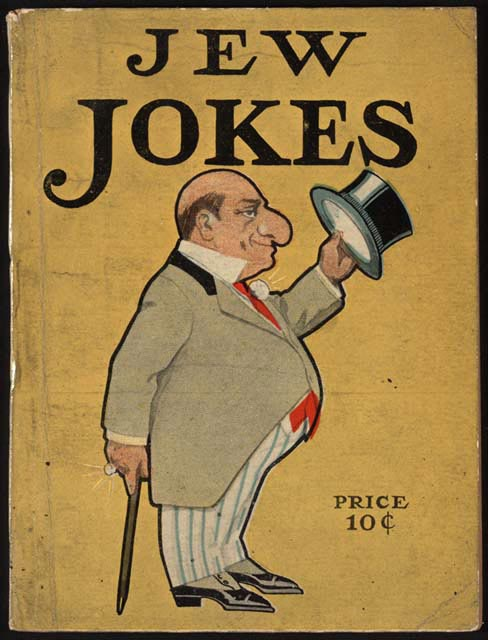
A man with an exaggerated "Jewish nose" depicted on the cover of an American joke book, 1908

The Jewish nose, also known as the Jew's nose and the Middle Eastern nose, is an antisemitic ethnic stereotype referring to a nose with a prominent convex bridge, downward nasal tip and relatively broad nostrils. It was singled out as a hostile caricature of Jews in mid-13th century Europe and has since become a defining and persisting element of the overall Jewish stereotype globally. In modern times, it has also been adopted by Jews as a part of their identity to spite historical antisemitism.

Research has found that the nose design outlined by this ethnic stereotype is most prevalent among humans living in the Mediterranean Basin, and that this nose is far less prevalent among Jews than popularly supposed.

Among some Jewish communities, such as those in the United States, the so-called "Jewish nose" has come to be effectively "reclaimed" by some Jews as a defining characteristic of their Jewish identity, with general Jewish attitudes toward the trait having changed from mostly negative to mostly positive since the 1950s.

== Perceptions ==
Robert Knox, an 18th-century anatomist, described the supposed Jewish nose as "a large, massive, club-shaped, hooked nose." Another anatomist, Jerome Webster, described it in 1914 as having "a very slight hump, somewhat broad near the tip and the tip bends down."

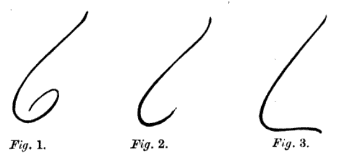
A 1886 sketch by Joseph Jacobs that illustrates the degrees of "Jewishness" of a nose

In the 19th century, Jewish folklorist Joseph Jacobs wrote: "A curious experiment illustrates this importance of the nostril toward making the Jewish expression. Artists tell us that the best way to make a caricature of the Jewish nose is to write a figure 6 with a long tail (Fig. 1); now remove the turn of the twist as in Figure 2, and much of the Jewishness disappears; it vanishes entirely when we draw the continuation horizontally as in Figure 3. We may conclude, then, as regards the Jewish nose, that it is more the Jewish nostril than the nose itself which goes to form the characteristic Jewish expression."

The statistics cited in the chapter "Nose" of the Jewish Encyclopedia (1901–1905) by Joseph Jacobs and Maurice Fishberg demonstrate that, contrary to the stereotype, the "Jewish", or hooked, nose is found with the same frequency among people of Jewish descent as it is among non-Jewish people from the Mediterranean region generally. The data collected by Jacobs and Fishberg showed that this type of nose is found in the minority of Jews (20–30%) and that the vast majority have a straight nose. In 1914, Fishberg examined the noses of 4,000 Jews in New York and found that only 14% could be described as either aquiline or hooked. In 1906, Felix von Luschan suggested that the arched nose in Jews is not a "Semitic" trait, but is a consequence of the intermixture with the "Hittites" in Asia Minor, noting that other races with Hittite blood, such as the Armenians, have similar noses. The same theory was held in 1910 by Houston Stewart Chamberlain, a racialist writer whose ideas on the racial inferiority of Jews influenced the development of Nazism.

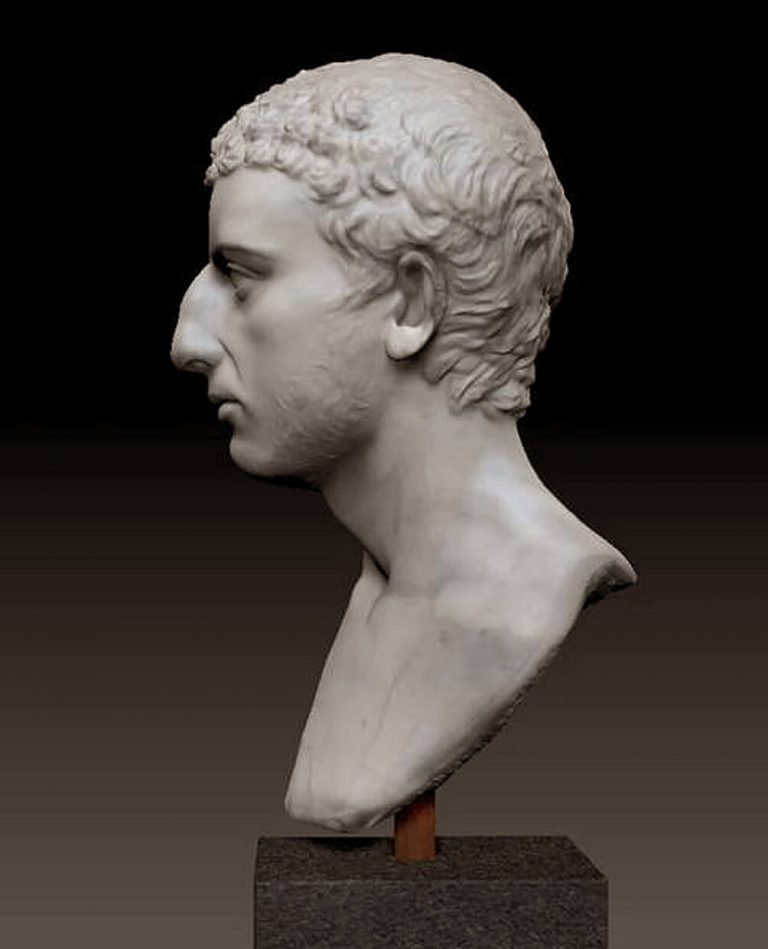
A Roman bust incorrectly identified in the early 20th century as representing the Roman-Jewish historian and military leader Josephus, based solely on stereotypes about the Jewish nose. Current scholarship definitively rejects this identification.

A Roman statue depicting a hawk-nosed figure in the collection of the Ny Carlsberg Glyptotek in Copenhagen, and acquired in 1891 from Princess Piombino, lacked an inscription in Latin identifying the subject but was presented by the museum in 1925 as Josephus, an identification defended by Robert Eisler. The grounds for Eisler's inference were simply that a notice in Eusebius stated that Josephus, the most famous Jew of his time, had a statue erected in his honour, and this bust, he thought, corresponded to a "crooked", "broken" "Jewish nose" as distinct from the classic aquiline Roman nose. The identification is still widely used online despite the fact that modern scholarship definitively rejects the claim. In addition, ancient Semitic peoples like Hebrews and Canaanites were depicted with straight protruding noses in artworks.

== History ==
Art historian Sarah Lipton traces the association of a hooked nose with Jews to the 13th century. Prior to that time, representations of Jews in art and iconography showed no specific facial features. "By the later thirteenth century, however, a move toward realism in art and an increased interest in physiognomy spurred artists to devise visual signs of ethnicity. The range of features assigned to Jews consolidated into one fairly narrowly construed, simultaneously grotesque and naturalistic face, and the hook-nosed, pointy-bearded Jewish caricature was born."

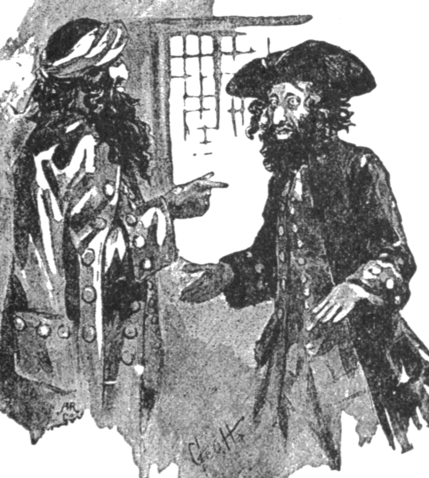
Two shnorrers: a Sephardi and an Ashkenazi (1894)

While the hooked nose became associated with Jews in the 13th century, the Jewish nose stereotype only became firmly established in the European imagination some centuries later. One early literary use of it is Francisco de Quevedo's A un hombre de gran nariz (To a man with a big nose) written against his rival in poetry, Luis de Góngora. The point of his sonnet was to mock his rival by suggesting his large nose was proof he was, not a 'pure blooded Spaniard', but the descendant of conversos, Jews who had converted to Catholicism to avoid expulsion. In particular, the reference to una nariz sayón y escriba (Spanish for 'a nose of a hangman and scribe') associates such a nose maliciously with the Pharisees and the Scribes responsible for Christ's death according to the New Testament. In his History of the Indies, (1653), Francisco López de Gómara argued for the thesis that the native population of the Americas must have descended from the Israelites, whom, a decade earlier, Antonio de Montezinos/Aharon Levi had claimed were the lost tribes of Israel, by citing the size of their noses.

George Mosse, describing negative stereotypes about various parts of a Jewish body, wrote: "The so-called Jewish nose, bent at the top, jutting hawk-like from the face, existed already as a caricature in the sixteenth century [...] It became firmly established as a so-called Jewish trademark only by the mid-eighteenth century, however, and soon became a foil for the straight nose of Greek beauty."

In the late 1800s, German anthropologists remarked that Pacific Islanders, like Palauans and Papuans, possessed similar noses to Jews.

The hooked nose became a key feature in antisemitic Nazi propaganda. "One can most easily tell a Jew by his nose," wrote Nazi propagandist Julius Streicher in a children's story. "The Jewish nose is bent at its point. It looks like the number six. We call it the 'Jewish six.' Many Gentiles also have bent noses. But their noses bend upwards, not downwards. Such a nose is a hook nose or an eagle nose. It is not at all like a Jewish nose."

According to writer Naomi Zeveloff, "in prewar Berlin, where the modern nose job was first developed, Jews sought the procedure to hide their ethnic identity." The inventor of rhinoplasty, Jacques Joseph, had "a large Jewish clientele seeking nose jobs that would allow them to pass as gentiles in Berlin", wrote Zeveloff.

But this negative view of the Jewish nose was not shared by all Jews; Jewish Kabbalistic texts consider a large nose as a sign of character. In his book The Secrets of the Face (Hebrew: חכמת הפרצוף), Kabbalistic Rabbi Aharon Leib Biska wrote in 1888 that Jews have "the eagle's nose". "A nose that is curved down [...] with a small hump in the middle attests to a character that seeks to discover the secrets of wisdom, who shall govern fairly, be merciful by nature, joyful, wise and insightful."

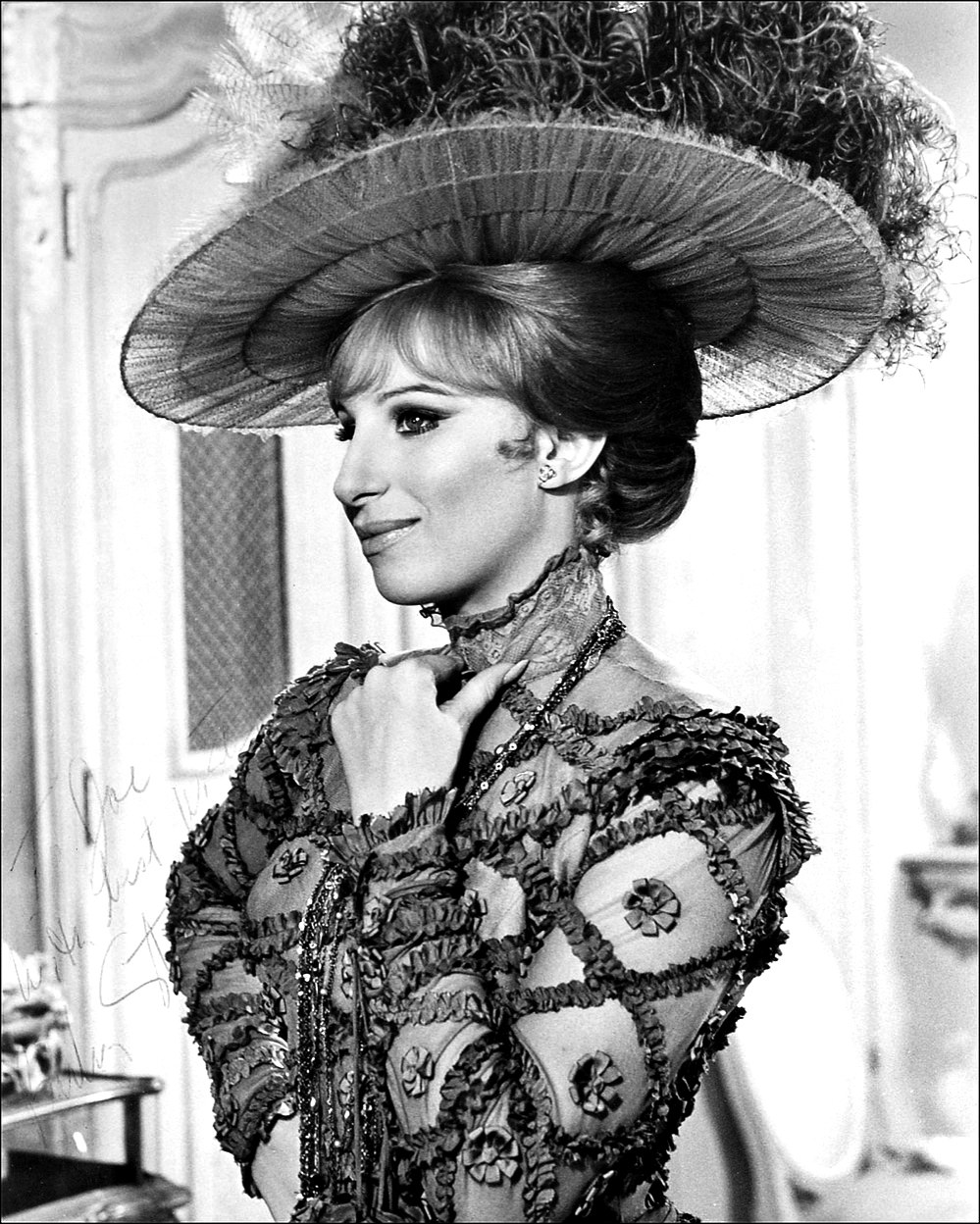
American-Jewish singer and actress Barbra Streisand in a publicity photoshoot for Hello, Dolly! (1969)

Among those seeking surgery to make their noses smaller were many American Jewish film actresses of the 1920s to 1950s. "Changing one's name is to Jewish males what fixing one's nose is to Jewish females, a way of passing," writes film historian Patricia Erens. One of the actresses to undergo surgery was Fanny Brice, inspiring commentator Dorothy Parker to comment that she "cut off her nose to spite her race." According to Erens, this fashion ended with Barbra Streisand, whose nose is a signature feature. Streisand told Playboy magazine in 1977, "When I was young, everyone would say, 'You gonna have your nose done?' It was like a fad, all the Jewish girls having their noses done every week at Erasmus Hall High School, taking perfectly good noses and whittling them down to nothing. The first thing someone would have done would be to cut my bump off. But I love my bump, I wouldn't cut my bump off."

"As Jews assimilated into the American mainstream in the 1950s and '60s, nose jobs became a rite of passage for Jewish teens who wanted a more Aryan look," wrote Zeveloff. By 2014, the number of rhinoplasty operations had declined by 44 percent, and "in many cases the procedure has little bearing on [...] religious identity."

== In non-Jewish literature and cinema ==
In The American Scene (1905), Henry James alluded to the stereotype in a description of the Jewish slums in New York City's Lower East Side by comparing Jews to a "sallow aquarium [with] innumerable fish, of over-developed proboscis".

The Jewish nose stereotype was a common motif in the work of Thomas Mann, who described it as "too flat, fleshy, down-pressed". In his 1909 novel Royal Highness, for example, Mann invents a Jewish doctor, Sammet, whose nose is described as giving away his origins, being "too broad at the bottom". In The Great Gatsby (1925), F. Scott Fitzgerald's portrayal of the gangster Meyer Wolfsheim (also Wolfshiem) focused on his "expressive nose", a reference Fitzgerald later denied was antisemitic, despite privately expressing "bias toward Jews and ethnic others ... into the 1930s".

In Ernest Hemingway's The Sun Also Rises (1926), Robert Cohn breaks his nose while boxing at Princeton University and thereby "certainly improve[s]" it. Princeton, a place with a predominantly White Anglo-Saxon Protestant student body at the time, is also the first place where Cohn feels inferior and "race-conscious" for his Judaism, despite having attended and played football at a predominantly Christian military school prior. In the 1942 The Adventures of Tintin story The Shooting Star, the main antagonist is Blumenstein, a hook-nosed Jewish-American. In post-war editions the character's nose was smaller and his name changed to Bohlwinkel.

In his 1970 treatise on Malay identity, The Malay Dilemma, Malaysian Prime Minister Mahathir Mohamad characterized Jews as being "hook-nosed". In 2018, when questioned about his characterization of Jews during a BBC HARDtalk interview, Mahathir stated, "They are hook-nosed. Many people called the Malays fat-nosed. We didn't object, we didn't go to war for that."

In the 2022 film Everything Everywhere All at Once, the character of "Debbie the Dog Mom", portrayed by Jewish actress Jenny Slate, was originally credited as "Big Nose". The name was changed for the film's digital release after criticism because of its association with Jewish stereotypes and antisemitism.

== In Jewish literature and cinema ==
Heinrich Heine in his The Baths of Lucca creates a satiric portrait of the Jewish upstart figure Gumpel trying, under false aristocratic pretenses, to ingratiate his way into high society, while waiting for God to restore the Jews to their ancestral homeland. The problem is his nose, which is so long it almost pokes out the narrator's eyes when they meet. God must eventually make good on his promise of a return to Israel, the narrator reflects:

a promise which has been leading them by the nose for two thousand years. Is this being led by the nose the reason, perhaps, why their noses have grown so long? Or are these long noses a kind of uniform, by which the divine old king Jehovah recognizes his palace guards even when they have deserted?

In American Jewish literature and cinema, the Jewish nose has been a defining characteristic – for better or for worse – of the American Jewish identity. "The nose is [...] a physical symbol of otherness, definitely for Jews," as Philip Roth and other artists note, writes literary critic Roy Goldblatt. Big noses for Jews, small noses for non-Jews, and the frequent appearance of rhinoplasty "as an instrument of (attempted) Americanization" all appear in Jewish literature as showing "the special significance attached to the nose as a factor marking the otherness of Jews – historically, in print, on stage, and on the screen," writes Goldblatt.

Goldblatt cites numerous examples of Jewish writers discussing the Jewish nose. As Philip Roth writes in Portnoy's Complaint, "Goyim are the people for whom Nat 'King' Cole sings every Christmastime, 'Chestnuts roasting on an open fire, Jack Frost nipping at your nose' [...] 'No, no, theirs are the noses whereof he speaks. Not his flat black one or my long bumpy one, but those tiny bridgeless wonders whose nostrils point northward automatically at birth."

Joshua Louis Moss cites Woody Allen's movie Sleeper as another example of the Jewish nose as an element of the American Jewish identity. "The historical and ethnoreligious connections are made palpable in the film's main structuring comedy motif, one of the central tropes of twentieth-century anti-Semitism: the contested landscape of the Jewish nose [...] Nose jokes recur throughout the film in both dialogue and sight gags." For example, in one scene two robots with outlandishly large noses speak with heavy Yiddish accents. In another scene, Allen assassinates the dictator in the movie by throwing the tyrant's distinctly non-Jewish-looking nose under a steamroller.

While large noses are taken as a sign of Jewishness, Jewish authors take small noses as a sign of the Gentile. "Neither Sarah's way of speaking nor her manner was that of a daughter of Israel. Suddenly they remembered she didn't look Jewish, that she had a snub nose, high cheekbones, teeth that were strangely white [...] unlike those found among the Jews," writes Isaac Bashevis Singer in his novel The Slave. "'Don't you know what that girl is who is asleep beside you? Just look at that nose.' 'What nose?' 'That's the point – it's hardly even there [...] Schmuck, this is the real McCoy. A Shikse! (non-Jewish woman)'" writes Philip Roth in Portnoy's Complaint. "We started out with short beards and straight noses – you can look at the wall paintings – and who knows? With a slightly different genetic break in our wanderings and couplings, we might all be as blond and gorgeous today as Danish Schoolchildren," writes Joseph Heller in God Knows.

Bernice Schrank notes that Jewish attitudes toward the Jewish nose have changed from negative in the 1950s to positive today. "The change from unacceptability to acceptability is based on an increasingly successful challenge to the American myth of melting pot sameness by the politics of ethnic difference."

== See also ==
- Anatomy of the human nose
- Aquiline nose
- Jewish DNA
- Mediterranean race
- Visibly Jewish
