= Jewish–Romani relations =

Jews and Romani people have interacted for centuries, particularly since the arrival of Romani people in Europe in the 9th century. Both communities have histories of living in diaspora communities, and both have experienced persecution in Europe since the medieval period. While antisemitism and anti-Romani bigotry manifest differently, there are overlapping prejudices, such as the use of blood libel; the false accusation that Jewish or Romani people kidnap and kill children for ritualistic purposes or the removal of organs. The systematic murder of both Jews and Romani people during the Holocaust has strengthened Jewish-Romani relations during the post-WWII era.

== History ==
Jews and Romani people are among the oldest ethnic minority groups in Europe. Jews have had some presence in Europe for over two thousand years, with some Jewish communities existing in the Mediterranean region, mainly Italy, prior to the Common Era. Scholars believe that the ancestors of Romani people left the Punjab region of what is now India and Pakistan 1,500 years ago. Romani people are believed to have begun arriving in Europe in the 9th century.

=== 17th century ===
While not Jewish himself, the Elizabethan playwright Thomas Dekker (1572-1632) was one of the first people in England to provide a written comparison between the Romani people and Jewish people. Dekker described Romani as "a people more scattered than Jews: beggerly in apparell, barbarous in condition, beastly in behaviour..."

=== 20th century ===
Many Jews who lived among or close by to Romani communities or went to the same concentration camps as them showed antipathetic behavior towards the Romani victims while those who lived farther, or not knowing what the Roma were going through tended to be more sympathetic.

=== 21st century ===
In 2017, a round table was held involving both Jewish and Romani activists, religious leaders, and lay people in the United Kingdom, organized by CCJO René Cassin and the Board of Deputies of British Jews. The Board of Deputies states that "Jews, Gypsies, Roma and Travellers have a great deal in common", including a shared history of persecution and contemporary concerns about rising hate crimes.

In 2018, a proposal by the Italian Interior Minister Matteo Salvini to create a government registry listing all Romani people in Italy was widely condemned by Italian Jews. The Union of Italian Jewish Communities issued a statement comparing the proposal to historic antisemitic legislation passed by the Italian fascist government in the 1930s.

Observers have noted an increase in both antisemitic and anti-Romani bigotry in Hungary during the 21st century. World Jewish Congress president Ronald S. Lauder has said that the persecution of Jews and Romani people are linked, highlighting the persecution of both groups during the Holocaust.

== Ottoman Empire ==
Jews in the Ottoman Empire had close relationships with the Muslim Roma around them. Muslim Roma worked for wealthy Jews and played music at their weddings. The Ottoman historian Evliya Celebi told: The Muslim Gypsies celebrated Easter with the Greeks, the Festival of Sacrifice with the Turks, and Passover with the Jews.

== Jewish law and Romani law ==
Cornell University professor Calum Carmichael has discussed the similarities and differences between Jewish religious law (halakha) and Romani law (marime). He notes ritualistic similarities regarding avoidance of blood from animals or menstruating women and detailed standards regarding ritual hygiene and food consumption but notes that Jewish law and Romani law do not share common origins. Marquette University professor Alison Barnes has stated that comparing and contrasting Jewish law and Romani law can provide "insight regarding the effects of ritual behavior on the observant", despite the major differences between the two approaches. Muslim Roma do not eat pork; they circumcise their sons age 3-7 years, bury the foreskin like Jews, and have a Kirvo like a Sandak in Jewish faith.

== Romani Jews ==
The majority of Romani people are Christians or Muslims. The number of Romani Jews is small. Jewish Romani people have been noted in Belarus and in Sofia, Bulgaria. According to Ian Hancock, there are Romani Jews, but every documented case he was aware of had been of conversion by the Romani person through marriage to a Jewish spouse that occurred during World War II in a "marriage camp" near the Serbian border, but the fate and religious beliefs of any survivors remain unknown.

=== Zhutane Roma ===
A small group of people referred to as the Zhutane Roma emerged in Sofia, Bulgaria, during World War II. They were the mixed descendants of poor Jewish women who married Romani men. This group of Bulgarian Romani Jews lived in the neighborhood of Faculteta on Sredna Gora Street. There were over 100 Romani-Jewish families in Sofia. Following the Holocaust, most left for Israel, but several families stayed in Bulgaria.

== See also ==
- Doms in Israel
- Romani crucifixion nails legend
