= Racial antisemitism =

Prejudice against Jews based on race

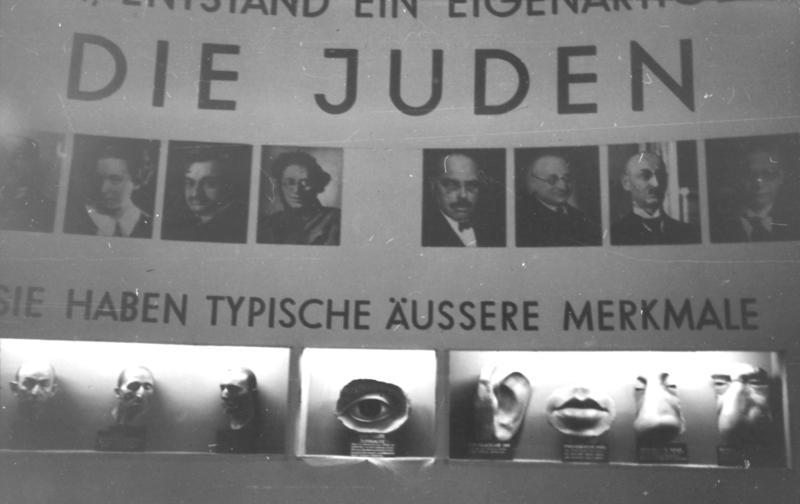
A fragment of the Nazi antisemitic propaganda film Der ewige Jude ("The Eternal Jew") which demonstrates purportedly typical physical features of the Jews

Racial antisemitism is prejudice against Jews based on a belief that Jews constitute a distinct race with inherent traits that are perceived as abhorrent, inferior, or otherwise different from the rest of a society. This abhorrence may find expression in the form of discrimination, stereotypes, or caricatures. Racial antisemitism may present Jews, as a group, as a threat to the values or safety of a society.

Because racial antisemitism was rooted in pre-Holocaust scientific theories, it appealed to educated European elites before World War II. It was more radical than religious antisemitism: to religious antisemites, a Jew is no longer Jewish once converted, but racial antisemitism posits that since Jews cannot get rid of their Jewishness, they must be physically removed from gentile society or isolated.

== Premise ==
Judaism is an ethnic religion, which means that the religion is integral to the Jews as a people or ethnicity. The premise of racial antisemitism is that the Jews form a distinct race that negatively impacts gentiles. Racial antisemitism differs from religious antisemitism, which involves prejudice against Jews and Judaism on the basis of their religion. According to William Nichols, one can distinguish historical religious antisemitism from "the new secular antisemitism" based on racial or ethnic grounds: "The dividing line was the possibility of effective conversion ... a Jew ceased to be a Jew upon baptism." However, with racial antisemitism:

Now the assimilated Jew was still a Jew, even after baptism ... From the Enlightenment onward, it is no longer possible to draw clear lines of distinction between religious and racial forms of hostility towards Jews... Once Jews have been emancipated and secular thinking makes its appearance, without leaving behind the old Christian hostility towards Jews, the new term antisemitism becomes almost unavoidable, even before explicitly racist doctrines appear.

== History ==
In the context of the Industrial Revolution, with the emancipation of the Jews (1790s onwards) and the Haskalah (the Jewish Enlightenment of the 18th and 19th centuries), many Jews rapidly urbanized and experienced a period of greater social mobility. With the decreasing role of religion in public life and the simultaneous tempering of religious antisemitism, a combination of growing nationalism, the rise of eugenics, resentment of the perceived socio-economic success of Jews, and the influx of Ashkenazi Jews from Eastern Europe to Western Europe and then to North America, soon led to the newer, and often more virulent, racist antisemitism.

Scientific racism, the ideology that genetics played a role in group behavior and characteristics, was highly respected and accepted as factual between 1870 and 1940. Historian Walter Lacquer lists numerous influential figures such as economist Eugen Duehring, composer Richard Wagner, Biblical scholar Paul de Lagarde, and historian-philosophers like Houston Stewart Chamberlain as important figures in the rise of racial antisemitism. This acceptance of race science made it possible for the Nazis to clothe their hatred of Jews in "scientific theory" and propose grand, sweeping political solutions in coming decades, from relocation to Madagascar to compulsory sterilization to mass extermination.

In the Third Reich (1933–1945), Nazis extended the logic of racial antisemitism, enshrining racial antisemitic ideas into laws which assessed the "blood" or ethnicity of people (rather than their current religious affiliations), and prescribing—purely on that basis—the subsequent fate of those so assessed. When added to its views on Jewish racial traits which Nazi pseudoscience devised, the logic of racial antisemitism led to the Holocaust of 1941–1945 as an attempt to eradicate conjured-up "Jewish traits" from the world.

=== Rise ===
Modern European antisemitism originated in 19th century pseudoscience which was used to justify the belief that the Semitic peoples, including the Jews, were entirely different from the Aryan, or Indo-European populations, inherently inferior, and thus deserving social segregation. These theories extend at least as far back as Martin Luther's 1543 treatise, On the Jews and Their Lies, in which he wrote that Jews are a "base, whoring people, that is, no people of God, and their boast of lineage, circumcision, and law must be accounted as filth".

Though many argue that Luther expressed prejudice against Judaism as a religion, not Jews as a race, Franklin Sherman, editor of the American Edition of Luther's Works, writes that "Luther's writings against the Jews … are not ‘merely a set of cool, calm and collected theological judgments. His writings are full of rage, and indeed hatred, against an identifiable human group, not just against a religious point of view." On the Jews and Their Lies was popular among supporters of the Nazi party during the early 20th century.

Hannah Arendt explained that before the 1870s, the Jewish population was a defined and detached group amongst western society. They were given rights and civil liberties as long as they served the states they lived in. However, due to their apolitical standing, they became an easy scapegoat and were visible to the public eye due to their position in state finance.

Those who espouse racial antisemitism do not necessarily oppose Jews because of their religion; instead, they ascribe hereditary racial stereotypes to them, such as having an undue facility with money, being lazy, unfriendly to outsiders, and lacking social graces or loyalty to their host country. Nazi propaganda also dwelt on supposed phenotypical differences, such as the shape of the "Jewish nose".

== Limpieza de sangre ==
Throughout the history of antisemitism, racial antisemitism has existed alongside religious antisemitism since at least the Middle Ages, if not before.

All people of Jewish ancestry were barred from public office, universities and many professions, a policy enforced for centuries after their expulsion from Spain. But even before the Edict of Expulsion of 1492, Spanish Jews who converted to Catholicism (conversos in Spanish), and their descendants, were called New Christians. They were frequently accused of lapsing back into their former religious practices (labeled "crypto-Jews").

To isolate the conversos in society, the Spanish nobility developed an ideology which it called "cleanliness of blood", calling them "New Christians" in order to indicate their inferior status within society. This produced a new form of racism: there had been no such gradation of Christianity before this point, for converts had been given equal standing with life-long Christians. "Cleanliness of blood" was an issue of ancestry and ethnicity, not an issue of personal religion. The first statute of purity of blood appeared in Toledo in 1449, where an anti-converso riot lead to conversos being banned from most official positions. Initially these statutes were condemned by both the monarchy and the Church. However, "New Christians" were later persecuted by the Spanish Inquisition after 1478, the Portuguese Inquisition after 1536, the Peruvian Inquisition after 1570 and the Mexican Inquisition after 1571, as well as the Inquisition in Colombia after 1610.

== Concept of a "Semitic race" ==
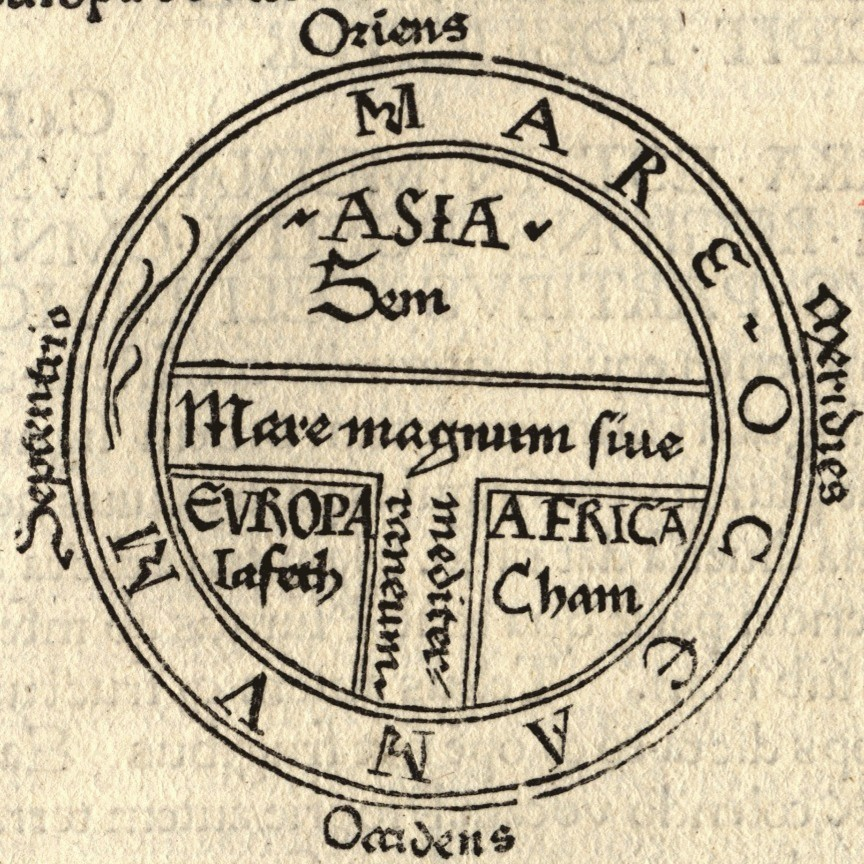
A stylised T and O map, depicting Asia as the home of the descendants of Shem (Sem). Africa is ascribed to Ham and Europe to Japheth.

In Medieval Europe, all Asian peoples were thought of as being the descendants of Shem. By the 19th century, the term "Semitic" was confined to the ethnic groups which speak Semitic languages or had origins in the Fertile Crescent, as the Jews in Europe did. These peoples were often considered to be a distinct race.

Arthur de Gobineau's pseudoscience theorized that the Semitic peoples arose from the blurring of distinctions between previously separate races. Gobineau did not necessarily consider the Semites (descendants of Shem) to be a lesser race, but essentialised humanity into three races: white, black, and yellow. When these races mixed, they underwent "degeneration". Gobineau believed that Aryans were the most "pure" white race, and that miscegenation would lead to mankind's downfall. Since the place where these three supposed races first met each other was located in the Middle East, Gobineau believed that Semitic peoples embodied the "confused" racial identity. This idea of racial "confusion" was taken up by the Nazi ideologue Alfred Rosenberg. It was used by the Nazis to perpetuate the idea that the Jews were going to destroy Germany.

This concept suited the interests of antisemites, as it used scientific racism to rationalize racial antisemitism. Variations of this theory were espoused in the writings of many antisemites in the late 19th century. The Nazi ideologue Alfred Rosenberg developed a variant of this theory in his writings, arguing that Jewish people were not a "real" race. According to Rosenberg, their evolution resulted from the mixing of pre-existing races rather than natural selection. The theory of "semiticization" was typically associated with other longstanding racist fears about the dilution of racial differences through miscegenation, which manifested in stereotypical images of mulattos and members of other mixed groups.

== Racial antisemitic legislation ==
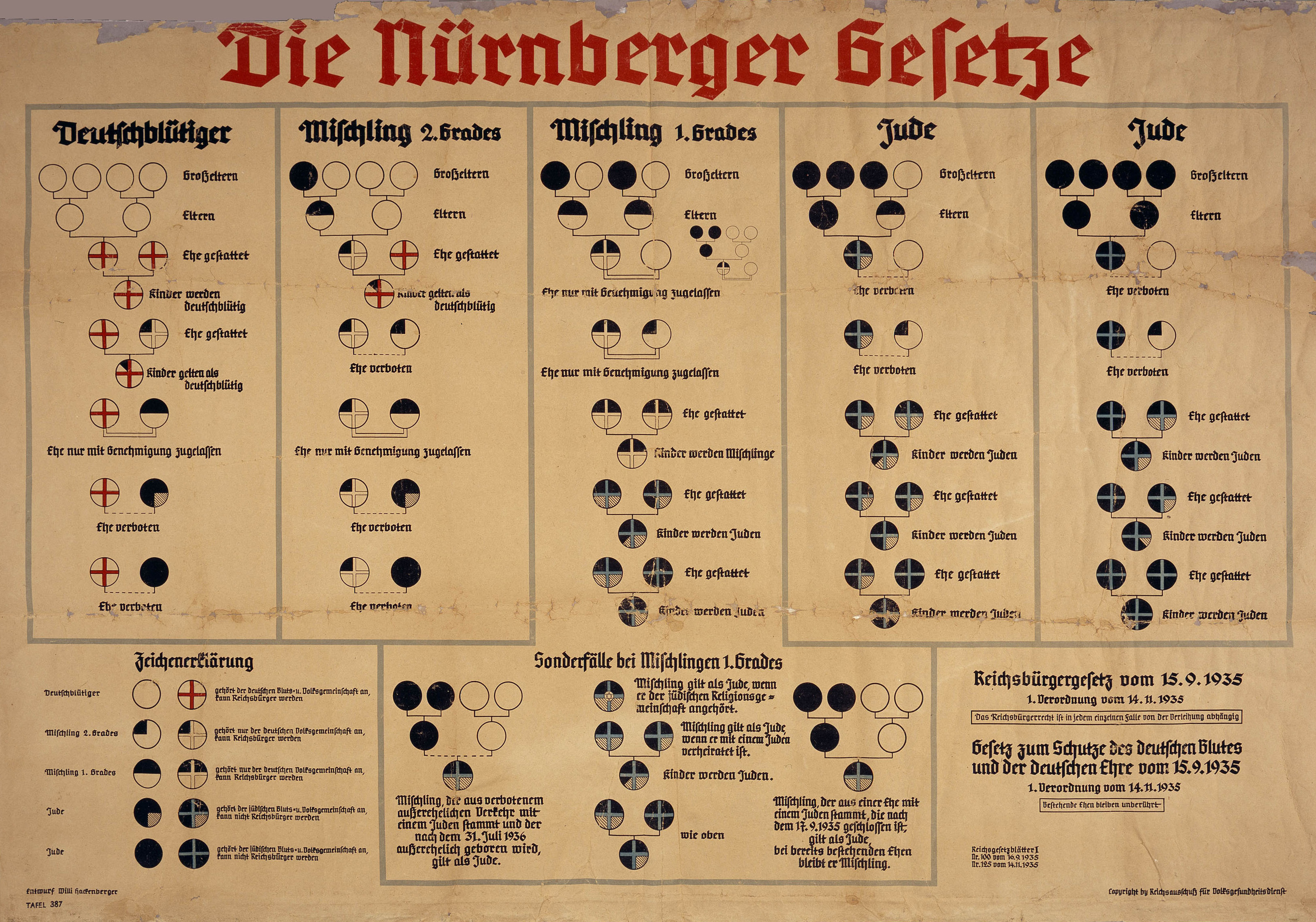
A chart use to explain the Nuremberg Laws of 1935, which used a pseudo-scientific racial basis for discrimination against Jews

In Nazi Germany, the Nuremberg Race Laws of 1935 imposed severe restrictions on "aliens" such as Jews or anyone of Jewish heritage. These laws deprived Jews of citizenship rights and they also prohibited sexual relations and marriages between Aryans and Jews (according to Nazi ideology and according to the race laws, such relations were crimes and as a result, they were punishable as Rassenschande or "racial pollution"). These laws stated that on the basis of their race, all Jews were no longer citizens of their own country (their official title became "subject of the state"). This meant that they had no basic citizens' rights, e.g., to vote. In 1936, Jews were banned from all professional jobs, effectively preventing them from having any influence in politics, higher education and industry. On 15 November 1938, Jewish children were banned from going to normal schools. By April 1939, nearly all Jewish companies had either been confiscated, collapsed under financial pressure and declining profits, or their owners had been persuaded to sell them out to the Nazi government. This law further reduced their human rights; they were legally reduced to the status of second-class citizens compared to the status of the non-Jewish populace. These laws were a major contributing factor to the Holocaust against the Jews and other groups from 1941 to 1945.

Racial antisemitic laws were also passed elsewhere. In the 19th century, King Frederick II of Prussia enacted multiple laws which were harmful to the Jewish people of the time such as laws which restricted marriages between them. In Austria, laws also limited the number of children which Jewish families were allowed to have, to prevent the rise of the Jewish population, the law only allowed a Jewish family to have one child.

== See also ==
- Genetic studies of Jews
- Jewish ethnic divisions
- Visibly Jewish
