= The Secret Relationship Between Blacks and Jews =

1991 book by the Nation of Islam

The Secret Relationship Between Blacks and Jews Volume One
- Author: Historical Research Department of NOI
- Language: English
- Publisher: Nation of Islam
- Publication date: 1991
- Publication place: United States
- Media type: Print (hardback & paperback)
- Pages: 334 pp
- ISBN: 0-9636877-0-0
- LC Class: E185

The Secret Relationship Between Blacks and Jews is a three-volume work of pseudo-scholarship, published by the Nation of Islam. The first volume, which was released in 1991, asserts that Jews dominated the Atlantic slave trade. The Secret Relationship has been widely criticized for being antisemitic and for failing to provide an objective analysis of the role of Jews in the slave trade. The American Historical Association issued a statement condemning claims that Jews played a disproportionate role in the Atlantic slave trade, and other historians such as Wim Klooster and Seymour Drescher concluded that the role of Jews in the overall Atlantic slave trade was in fact minimal.

The book uses selective citations in order to exaggerate the role of Jews.

== Reception ==
The book's thesis has been labeled an antisemitic canard by historians, including Saul S. Friedman, who contends that Jews had a minimal role in the New World slave trade. Henry Louis Gates Jr., head of the department of Afro-American studies at Harvard University, called the book "the Bible of new antisemitism" and added that "the book massively misinterprets the historical record, largely through a process of cunningly selective quotations of often reputable sources". Other black academics came forward to condemn the book. Eugene Genovese, an American historian and expert on slavery, wrote that the book "rivals The Protocols of the Elders of Zion in fantasy and gross distortion. The absurdity of its pretenses to scholarship are outweighed by its sheer viciousness. It must be taken with deadly seriousness as a transparent attempt to foment antisemitism, irrationality, and hatred, and to subvert intellectual discourse and common decency on our campuses."

Wim Klooster noted that in "no period did Jews play a leading role as financiers, shipowners, or factors in the Transatlantic or Caribbean slave trades. They possessed far fewer slaves than non-Jews in every British and Spanish territory in North America, South America and the Caribbean. Even when Jews in a handful of places owned slaves in proportions slightly above their representation among a town's families, such cases do not come close to corroborating the assertions of The Secret Relationship."

The book was criticized for being antisemitic and for failing to provide an objective analysis of the role of Jews in the slave trade. Common criticisms were that the book used selective quotes, made "crude use of statistics," and was purposefully trying to exaggerate the role of Jews. Historian Ralph A. Austen criticized the book, saying that the "distortions are produced almost entirely by selective citation rather than explicit falsehood ... more frequently there are innuendos imbedded in the accounts of Jewish involvement in the slave trade," and "[w]hile we should not ignore the antisemitism of The Secret Relationship..., we must recognize the legitimacy of the stated aim of examining fully and directly even the most uncomfortable elements in our [Black and Jewish] common past."

In 1995, the American Historical Association (AHA) issued a statement condemning "any statement alleging that Jews played a disproportionate role in the Atlantic slave trade."

The publication of The Secret Relationship spurred retorts published specifically to refute the thesis of The Secret Relationship:

- 1992 – Harold Brackman, Jew on the Brain: A Public Refutation of the Nation of Islam's The Secret Relationship Between Blacks and Jews. The booklet was edited and published independently by Bill Adler, the former director of publicity for Def Jam Recordings, after learning that the rapper Ice Cube had endorsed The Secret Relationship. In his foreword, Adler wrote, "I care way too much about black-Jewish relations – and particularly about black-Jewish relations in the rap community – to allow 'The Secret Relationship' to go unchallenged." The booklet's afterword was written by Cornel West. It was republished that same year, minus its original foreword and afterword, as "Farrakhan's Reign of Historical Error: The Secret Relationship Between Blacks & Jews" by the Simon Wiesenthal Center. In 1994, it was republished for a second time under the title "Ministry of Lies: the Truth Behind 'The Secret Relationship Between Blacks and Jews'" by Four Walls Eight Windows.
- 1992 – David Brion Davis, "Jews in the Slave Trade," in Culturefront (Fall 1992) pp. 42–45.
- 1993 – Seymour Drescher, "The Role of Jews in the Atlantic Slave Trade," Immigrants and Minorities, 12 (1993), pp. 113–125.
- 1993 – Marc Caplan, Jew-Hatred As History: An Analysis of the Nation of Islam's "The Secret Relationship" (Published by the Anti Defamation League).
- 1998 – Eli Faber, Jews, Slaves, and the Slave Trade: Setting the Record Straight, New York University Press.
- 1999 – Saul S. Friedman, Jews and the American Slave Trade, Transaction. Friedman's work has been described as a successful rebuke of The Secret Relationship. In his work, Friedman referred to The Secret Relationship as the "Handbook of Hate", and described it as "one part fact and nine parts fable".

Holocaust historian Deborah Lipstadt called the book the "African American-oriented version" of The Protocols of the Elders of Zion.

Legal historian Paul Finkelman states that the central thesis of the book is "ludicrous and considered absurd by all serious scholars."

Historian Glenn C. Altschuler and Robert Summers called The Secret Relationship a "compendium of conspiracy theories."

Classics scholar Mary Lefkowitz called the book "hate literature" and wrote: "The authors of The Secret Relationship continually misquote Jewish sources, taking quotations out of context, or citing as support works that actually say the opposite of what they are claiming. They make a number of claims that are impossible to substantiate, such as that Jews (rather than Arabs) dominated the transatlantic slave trade; that they were the dominant slave traders and holders in the South; that they raped black women; that they infected Native Americans with smallpox...The known facts about the slave trade give a completely different picture of the level of Jewish participation."

Seymour Drescher who analyzed the role of Jews in the overall Atlantic slave trade concluded that it was "minimal," and only identified certain regions (such as Brazil and the Caribbean) where the participation was "significant."

== Authorship ==
Although the book does not name its authors (only the research department of the Nation of Islam), in 2019, Gilles Karmasyn, head of the French anti-negationist website Pratique de l'Histoire et Dévoiements Négationnistes, published research indicating that the real authors of The Secret Relationship were a group of Afrocentric activists including Molefi Kete Asante, Jacob Carruthers, Asa Hilliard, Charshee McIntyre, and Rosalind Jeffries, led by Leonard Jeffries, and that Tony Martin participated too. Karmasyn alleges that The Secret Relationship borrows heavily (but is not limited to) from a 1968 pamphlet, Who Brought the Slaves to America?, authored by black nationalist Robert Brock and published by white supremacist Walter White.

== Subsequent volumes ==
Volume Two of The Secret Relationship Between Blacks and Jews was published in 2010, with the subtitle "How Jews Gained Control of the Black American Economy". According to the Anti-Defamation League, Volume Two blames Jews for "promoting a myth of black racial inferiority and makes a range of conspiratorial accusations about Jewish involvement in the slave trade and in the cotton, textiles, and banking industries".

Titled simply The Secret Relationship Between Blacks and Jews Volume 3, the third installment was published in 2016. As summarized by the ADL, the work claims the resurgence of the Ku Klux Klan and the subjugation of Black people during the early 20th century not only enriched but also was orchestrated by Jewish businessmen of the time. Further, the responsibility of the lynching of Leo Frank was also the work of Jews.

== See also ==
- African American–Jewish relations
- The American Mercury
- Louis Farrakhan
- Jewish views on slavery
- Tony Martin (professor)
- Nation of Islam and antisemitism
- Slavery in the United States
