= Jewish views on slavery =

Jewish views on slavery are varied both religiously and historically. Judaism's ancient and medieval religious texts contain numerous laws governing the ownership and treatment of slaves. Texts that contain such regulations include the Hebrew Bible, the Talmud, the 12th-century Mishneh Torah, and the 16th-century Shulchan Aruch.

The Hebrew Bible contained two sets of laws, one for non-Israelite slaves (known in later writings by the term "Canaanite slaves"), and a more lenient set of laws for Israelite slaves. The Talmud's slavery laws, which were established in the second through the fifth centuries CE, contain a single set of rules for all slaves, although there are a few exceptions where Hebrew slaves are treated differently from non-Hebrew slaves. The laws include punishment for slave owners that mistreat their slaves. In the modern era, when the abolitionist movement sought to outlaw slavery, some supporters of slavery used the laws to provide religious justification for the practice of slavery.

Broadly, the Biblical and Talmudic laws tended to consider slavery a form of contract between persons, theoretically reducible to voluntary slavery, unlike chattel slavery, where the enslaved person is legally rendered the personal property (chattel) of the slave owner. Hebrew slavery was prohibited during the Rabbinic era for as long as the Temple in Jerusalem is defunct (i.e., since 70 CE). Although not prohibited, Jewish ownership of non-Jewish slaves was constrained by Rabbinic authorities since non-Jewish slaves were to be offered conversion to Judaism during their first 12-months term as slaves. If accepted, the slaves were to become Jews, hence redeemed immediately. If rejected, the slaves were to be sold to non-Jewish owners. Accordingly, the Jewish law produced a constant stream of Jewish converts with previous slave experience. Additionally, Jews were required to redeem Jewish slaves from non-Jewish owners, making them a privileged enslavement item, albeit temporary.

Historically, some Jewish people owned and traded slaves. They participated in the medieval slave trade in Europe up to about the 12th century. Several scholarly works have been published to rebut the antisemitic canard of Jewish domination of the Atlantic slave trade during the early modern period, and to show that Jews had no major or continuing impact on the history of New World slavery. They possessed far fewer slaves than non-Jews in every British colony in the Americas, and according to modern Jewish historians, "in no period did they play a leading role as financiers, shipowners, or factors in the transatlantic or Caribbean slave trades" (Wim Klooster quoted by Eli Faber).

American mainland colonial Jews imported slaves from Africa at a rate proportionate to the general population. As slave sellers, their role was more marginal, although their involvement in the Brazilian and Caribbean trade is believed to be considerably more significant. Jason H. Silverman, a historian of slavery, describes the part of Jews in slave trading in the southern United States as "minuscule", and writes that the historical rise and fall of slavery in the United States would not have been affected at all had there been no Jews living in the American South. Though every fourth Jew owned a slave, they accounted for only 1.25% of all Southern slave owners, and were not significantly different from other slave owners in their treatment of slaves.

== Biblical era ==
Ancient Israelite society allowed slavery; however, total domination of one human being by another was not permitted. Rather, slavery in antiquity among the Israelites was closer to what would later be called indentured servitude. In fact, there were cases in which, from a slave's point of view, the stability of servitude under a family in which the slave was well-treated would have been preferable to economic freedom.

The Hebrew Bible contains two sets of rules governing slaves: one set for Hebrew slaves (Lev 25:39–43) and a second set for non-Hebrew slaves (Lev 25:44–46). Hebrews could become slaves either because of extreme poverty (in which case they could sell themselves to an Israelite owner) or as punishment for a crime. Hebrew slaves were freed after six years of service, or when the Jubilee year arrived. They were treated as servants or hired workers, and the master was forbidden to make them do harsh labor.

The laws governing non-Hebrew slaves were harsher: non-Hebrew slaves could be owned permanently, and bequeathed to the owner's children. They were acquired from the surrounding nations (Lev 25:44) or from "strangers who live among [Israelites]". Despite this, the book of Deuteronomy required rest for non-Hebrew slaves on Shabbat and their participation in Temple and holiday celebrations. Participation in holidays like Passover also ensured the acquisition of Hebrew status for non-Hebrew slaves since they were banned from celebrating Passover unless they circumcised, which made them equivalent to the native-born Israelite (Exodus 12:48). Deuteronomy further describes all non-Israelite laborers as being parties to God's covenant as members of the Israelite community although this contentious (Deuteronomy 29:9). Saul Olyan argued that non-Israelites, regardless of background, automatically became Israelite if they lived in their territory (Ezekiel 47:21–23), reflecting early Israelite practices.

In English translations of the Bible, the ethnic distinction is sometimes emphasized by translating the word ebed (עבד) as "slave" in the context of non-Hebrew slaves, and "servant" or "bondman" for Hebrew slaves. Throughout the Hebrew Bible, ebed is also used to denote government officials who serve the king, sometimes high-ranking (for example, Pharaoh's advisors, or Nathan-melech, whose seal bearing the title ebed was discovered in archeological excavations).

Proposed explanations for the differential treatment include all non-Hebrew slaves being subject to the curse of Canaan and God not wanting Hebrews to be enslaved again after freeing them from Egyptian enslavement. In Leviticus 25:42 the difference is justified by God's stating that "[Israelites] are My slaves, in that I took them out of the land of Egypt; they shall not be sold into [human] slavery", in contrast to non-Israelites who do not have this history. Isaac S.D. Sassoon argued that it was the result of a bargain struck between commoners and landowners. Commoners protested the widespread practice of Israelites enslaving each other whilst landowners defended slavery as being indispensable to agriculture. However, he notes that this was anomalous since other biblical literature approved of slavery being heavily regulated and even abolished, regardless of form. Rashi similarly proposed that it answered the question on who would serve the Israelite as a slave.

Talmudic commentators likewise encouraged non-Hebrew slaves to convert to Judaism, which helped them bypass the harsh treatment.

Exodus 21:16 establishes a death sentence for any man who steals, or kidnaps, another man.

It is impossible for scholars to quantify the number of slaves that were owned by ancient Israelites, or what percentage of households owned slaves, but it is possible to analyze social, legal, and economic impacts of slavery. Most slaves owned by Israelites were non-Hebrew, and scholars are not certain what percentage of slaves were Hebrew: Ephraim Urbach, a distinguished scholar of Judaism, maintains that Israelites rarely owned Hebrew slaves after the Maccabean era, although it is certain that Israelites owned Hebrew slaves during the time of the Babylonian exile. After the destruction of the Temple in Jerusalem in 70 CE, nearly all rabbis agreed that Jews were no longer allowed to own Jewish slaves, and some rabbis and communities ruled that non-Jewish slaves could not be held either, though others permitted it.

The Torah forbids the return of runaway slaves who escape from their foreign land and their bondage and arrive in the Land of Israel. Furthermore, the Torah demands these runaway slaves be treated equally to any other resident alien. This law is unique in the Ancient Near East.

== Talmudic era ==
The rabbis of the Talmudic era "were unable to fully nullify the institution of slavery, but there is a prominent trend among them to limit its incidence as much as possible by means of [Biblical] interpretation." While Jews did take slavery as a given, just as in other ancient societies, slaves in Jewish households could expect more compassionate treatment.

Early rabbinic literature contains an extensive set of laws governing slavery, much more detailed than the laws found in the Torah. This included an expanded set of obligations the owner incurred toward the slave, codifying the process for manumission (the freeing from slavery), and described a large set of conditions in which manumission was allowed or required. These restrictions were based on the Biblical injunction to treat slaves well with the reinforcement of the memory of Egyptian slavery which Jews were urged to remember by their scriptural texts. Historian Josephus wrote Israelites enslaved as punishment for a crime were automatically released in the Jubilee year. In addition, the notion of Canaanite slaves from the Jewish Bible is expanded to all non-Jewish slaves.

The major change found in the Talmud's slavery laws was that a single set of rules, with a few exceptions, governs both Jewish slaves and non-Jewish slaves.

Significant effort is given in the Talmud to address the property rights of slaves. While the Torah only refers to a slave's specific ability to collect gleanings, Talmudic sources interpret this commandment to include the right to own property more generally, and even "purchase" a portion of their own labor from the master. At the same time, lost objects (if non-returnable) found by the slave were considered to belong to the master, as for this purpose their actions were seen as an extension of the master's.

If a slave were to perform a tort, the master was not required to pay damages to the victim, on the theory that otherwise the slave would intentionally do so to get revenge against the master.

=== Methods of acquisition ===
Jewish slaves could be acquired by money or contract, being sold by a Jewish court of law due to having engaged in thefts and not having that which to pay. In such cases, the slave does not work beyond six years. A Jewish bondmaid is sold by her father into servitude, usually because of severe poverty, but the girl's master, as a first resort, is required to betroth her in marriage after using her as his bondmaid. Jewish slavery may only be practiced when the entire nation of Israel is settled in their land and the laws of the Jubilee have been re-instated, and therefore has been forbidden by nearly all rabbis since the destruction of the Temple in 70 CE.

Non-Jewish slaves could be acquired in three ways: by money, by contract, or by hazakah (usucaption). Hazakah of slaves can be performed "by making use of them, just as one would do with slaves before their master. How? Had he unlaced his shoe, or shod him with a shoe, or had he carried his items [of clothing] to the bath house, or helped him to get undressed, or rubbed him down with [medicinal] oil, scratched [his back] for him, or helped him to get dressed, or had he lifted-up his master, in such [ways] he has acquired him [as a slave]. [...] Had he forcibly attacked him and brought him along with him, he has acquired thereby a slave, since slaves are acquired by having them drawn-along in such a manner. [...] A slave who is but a child is acquired by drawing him along, without the necessity of having to attack him."

The Jerusalem Talmud states that an abandoned baby may be acquired as follows: if found in the marketplace and its parents cannot be found, nor two witnesses who are able to claim that the child is the son of so-and-so, and the baby is too small to move on its own, then the person who has taken them in acquires them by hazakah.

=== Freeing a slave ===
The Talmud affirmed that self-redemption of slaves (Jewish or not) was always permitted. Some sources discuss a person who was "half slave and half free" (working half the time for his master and half the time for himself), a measure apparently intended to allow him to earn money and redeem himself in installments.

Talmudic opinion was divided regarding the master's ability to voluntarily free a non-Jewish slave. The Bible had written "You may take [non-Jewish slaves] forever" (Lev 25:46), but the rabbis disagreed whether this verse permitted such slaves to be kept indefinitely, or else required it (i.e. forbidding manumission). The former opinion was more common in the Second Temple period, when freeing slaves was encouraged. One Talmudic rabbi even recommended that if a man's daughter had reached adulthood, he should free his non-Jewish slave in order to marry her. However, in time the more restrictive opinion became normative, and voluntary manumission of non-Jewish slaves was seen as generally forbidden, perhaps because in this period the Roman Empire persecuted Jews, and a non-Jewish slave who was only temporarily part of a Jewish household would be more likely to betray the Jewish community. Nevertheless, the prohibition on freeing non-Jewish slaves was not always followed in practice, and the Talmud also included a varied list of circumstances and conditions that overrode this principle and mandated manumission. They could be freed without their master's consent if:

- If their master permanently disabled the slave in an 'apparent' way. Exodus 21:26 requires freedom in the case of losing a tooth or eye, but this requirement was understood by the rabbis to apply to loss of any of the 24 irreplaceable chief limbs in a man's body as well. (Note: According to Maimonides, freedom due to disability was limited to slaves who had been immersed and circumcised as required at the beginning of their service, and required the verdict of a properly constituted court to formalize it.)
- If their master sold them to a non-Jew.
- If the slave came from a foreign land and found refuge in Israel.
- If their master abandoned them.
- If the slave was treated in a way that is only appropriate for a free man. E.g. if marriage to a free woman is arranged, wearing tefillin, being asked to read Torah verses etc.
- Oral promise
- Escape
- Desire to visit the Holy Land

In such circumstances, the master was required to provide the slave with a deed of manumission (sheṭar shiḥrūr) by the rabbinic court, presented to him with witnesses. Failure to comply would result in excommunication of the master. Freeing a non-Jewish slave was seen as a religious conversion, and must also be followed by a second immersion in a mikveh.

According to Maimonides, non-Jewish slaves could also be freed if someone bribed the master to free the slave. However, if the briber gave the money to the slave, the master could reject the bribe. Alternatively, the master could sign a deed of manumission in the presence of two witnesses. If the slave wished to be treated as Hebrew slaves, they must pre-empt their master to undergo ritual immersion (mikveh) before the latter announces their status as a slave.

=== Treatment of slaves ===
The Talmud insisted that Jewish slaves should be granted similar food, drink, lodging, and bedding, to that which their master would grant to himself. The rights granted to Jewish slaves were so exacting that the Talmud remarked that "One who purchases a Jewish slave has really purchased a master for himself." (Note: Furthermore, the Talmud instructed that servants were not to be unreasonably penalised for being absent from work due to sickness. The biblical seventh-year manumission was still to occur after the slave had been enslaved for six years; extra enslavement could not be tacked on to make up for the absence, unless the slave had been absent for more than a total of four years, and if the illness did not prevent light work (such as needlework), the slave could be ill for all six years without having to repay the time.) It was forbidden to make Jewish slaves perform harsh labor. While it was permitted to make non-Jewish slaves do harsh labor, masters were encouraged not to require this, on moral grounds. Rather, the master was encouraged to treat a non-Jewish slave mercifully, avoid causing them distress, feed them before the master fed himself, and not shout at them or embarrass them. Masters who killed their slaves received capital punishment like other murderers.

Scholars are unsure to what extent the laws encouraging humane treatment were followed. In the 19th century, Jewish scholars such as Moses Mielziner and Samuel Krauss generally concluded that Jewish slaves were treated as merely temporary bondsman, and that Jewish owners treated slaves with special compassion. These scholars may have "emphasiz[ed] the humanitarian aspects and moral values of ancient Judaism ... [to argue] that the Jewish tradition was not inferior to early Christian teachings on slaves and slavery." Later critical scholars such as Solomon Zeitlin and Ephraim Urbach reached similar conclusions, asserting that while slavery was an unavoidable part of the Hellenistic and Roman economic systems in which Jews lived, for ethical reasons Jews avoided the harsh treatment of slaves which was common among other contemporary nations. Some accounts indicate that Jewish slave-owners were affectionate, and would not sell slaves to a harsh master and that Jewish slaves were treated as members of the slave-owner's family.

=== Converting or circumcising non-Jewish slaves ===
The Talmudic laws required Jewish slave owners to try to convert non-Jewish slaves to Judaism. Other laws required slaves, if not converted, to be circumcised and undergo mikveh. Such slaves were not counted towards the minyan for public worship. A 4th century Roman law prevented the circumcision of non-Jewish slaves, so the practice may have declined at that time, but increased again after the 10th century. Jewish slave owners were not permitted to drink wine that had been touched by an uncircumcised man so there was always a practical need, in addition to the legal requirement, to circumcise slaves.

Although conversion to Judaism was a possibility for slaves, rabbinic authorities Maimonides and Karo discouraged it on the basis that Jews were not permitted (in their time) to proselytize; slaveowners could enter into special contracts by which they agree not to convert their slaves. Furthermore, to convert a slave into Judaism without the owner's permission was seen as causing harm to the owner, on the basis that it would rob the owner of the slave's ability to work during the Sabbath, and it would prevent them from selling the slave to non-Jews. Arguments for conversion include non-Jewish slaves having the tendency to spread compromising information to enemy nations. However, rabbis debate on whether they should be treated as native-born Jewish slaves after conversion.

One exceptional issue, codified by Maimonides, was the requirement allocating a 12-month period when a Jewish owner of non-Jewish would propose conversion to the slave. If accepted, the slave would transition from being a Canaanite to a Hebrew, triggering a set of rights associated with the latter, including an early release. As noted above, Maimonides did not see Hebrew slavery as being permissible until Israel is reestablished with full religious rigor. Consequently, the release of a slave was to be immediate upon conversion. If unaccepted, the Jewish slave owner was required to sell the slave to non-Jews by the end of the 12-month period (Mishneh Torah, Sefer Kinyan 5:8:14). Prior to enslavement, if the non-Jewish individual decides to become a permanent slave by refusing to convert, the 12-month period does not apply. Instead, the slave might elect to convert at any time, with the consequences described (Ibid). It is unclear to what extent Maimonides's prescription was actually followed, but some scholars believe it played a role in the formation of Ashkenazi Jews, partially formed from converted slaves freed according to Maimonides' procedure. Applications of this protocol were also proposed concerning the early formation of communities of African-American Jews.

The Maharashdam states that converted non-Jewish slaves should be freed even if they lack official evidence for conversion. Living a moral life was sufficient because "heathen slaves do not behave in this way".

=== Female slaves ===
The classical rabbis instructed that masters could never marry female slaves; rather, they would have to be manumitted first. Similarly, male slaves could not be allowed to marry Jewish women. Unlike the biblical instruction to sell thieves into slavery (if they were caught during daylight and could not repay the theft), the rabbis ordered that female Israelites could never be sold into slavery for this reason. Sexual relations between a slave owner and engaged slaves are prohibited in the Torah (Lev. 19:20–22).

=== Jewish views on non-Jewish ownership of slaves ===
According to Rashi and the Talmud, non-Jews are forbidden to own slaves, based on an exegesis of Leviticus 25:44.

=== Curse of Ham as a justification for slavery ===
Some scholars have asserted that the Curse of Ham which is described in Judaism's religious texts was used as a justification for slavery—citing the Tanakh (Jewish Bible) verses Genesis 9:20–27 and the Talmud. Scholars such as David M. Goldenberg have analyzed the religious texts, and as a result of their analyses, they have concluded that those conclusions are based on faulty interpretations of Rabbinical sources: Goldenberg concludes that the Judaic texts do not advocate any explicit anti-black precepts, instead, later race-based interpretations were applied to the texts by later, non-Jewish analysts.

While a slave of non-Jewish origin is known by the term "Canaanite slave in Jewish law", in fact this status should be applied to any person of non-Jewish origin who is held in bondage by an Israelite. According to Jewish law, such a slave should undergo a form of conversion to Judaism, after which they are obligated to perform all mitzvot except positive time-dependent mitzvot (just as Jewish women do), making him of a higher rank than ordinary gentiles when there is a question on whose life should be saved first. Moreover, whenever a Canaanite slave is set free he becomes a free Israelite with the same status as any other Jew, including permission to marry a Jewish woman.

== From the post-Talmudic era to the 1800s ==
=== Jewish slaves and masters ===
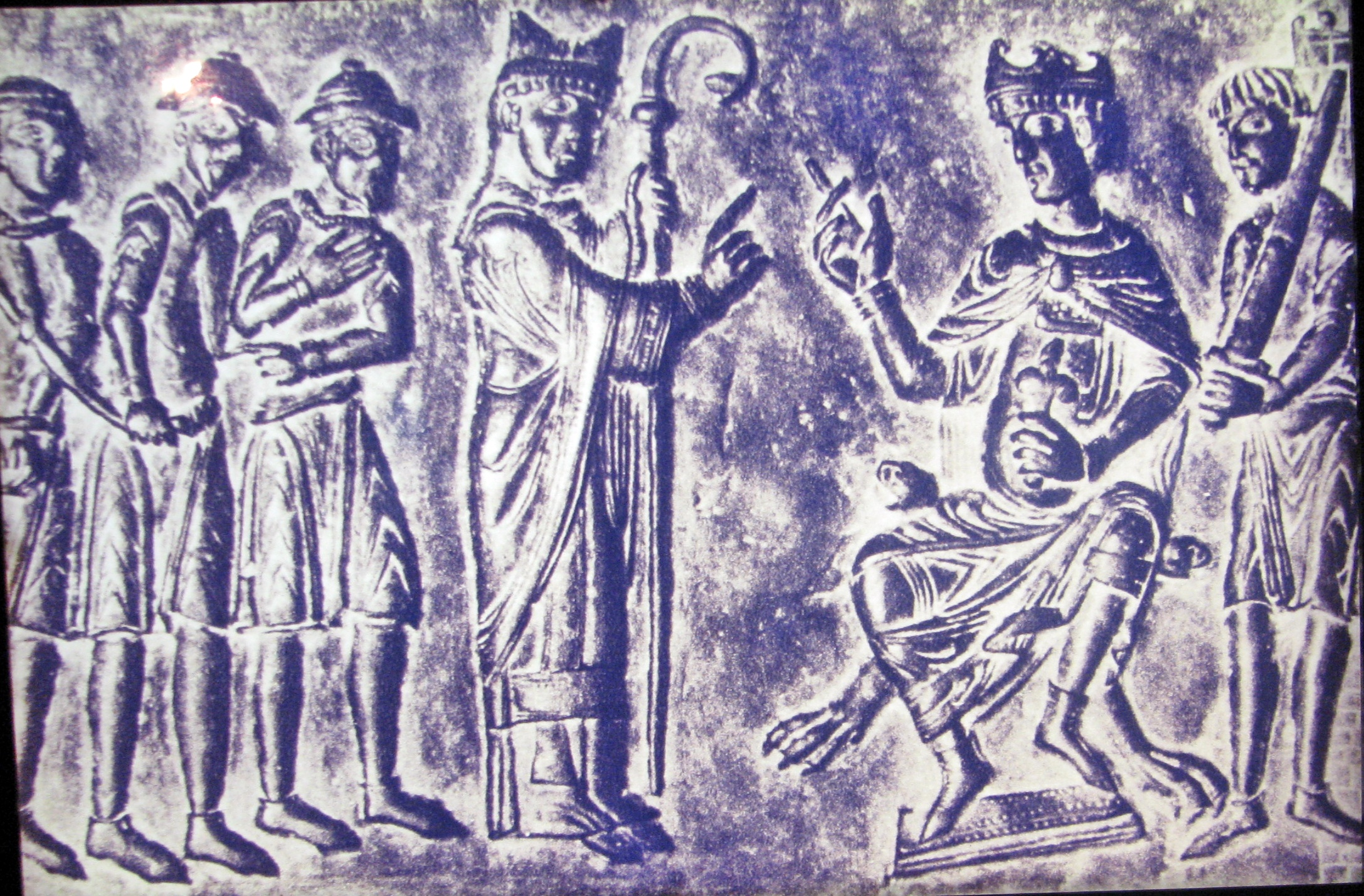
A Jewish slave trader being presented to Boleslas of Bohemia

The role of Jewish merchants in the early medieval slave trade has been subject to much misinterpretation and distortion. Although medieval records demonstrate that there were Jews who owned slaves in medieval Europe, Toch (2013) notes that the claim repeated in older sources, such as those by Charles Verlinden, that Jewish merchants where the primary dealers in European slaves is based on misreadings of primary documents from that era. Contemporary Jewish sources do not attest any a large-scale slave trade or ownership of slaves which may be distinguished from the wider phenomenon of early medieval European slavery. The trope of the Jewish dealer of Christian slaves was additionally a prominent image in medieval European anti-Semitic propaganda.

=== Halachic developments ===
Jewish laws governing slaves were restated in the 12th century by noted rabbi Maimonides in his book Mishneh Torah, and again in the 16th century by Rabbi Yosef Karo in his book Shulchan Aruch. Ownership of Jewish slaves was forbidden in this period, and a minority of rabbis prohibited the ownership of non-Jewish slaves as well, though most permitted it.

The legal prohibition against Jews owning Jewish slaves was emphasized in the Middle Ages yet some Jews continued to own Jewish slaves, and owners were able to bequeath Jewish slaves to the owner's children.

==== Redeeming Jewish slaves ====
The Hebrew Bible contains instructions to redeem (purchase the freedom of) Jewish slaves owned by non-Jews (Lev. 25:47–51), and this practice was formalized as the mitzvah of pidyon shvuyim. Following the suppression of the First Jewish–Roman War by the Roman army (66–70 CE), many Jews were taken to Rome as prisoners of war. In response, the Talmud contained guidance to ransom Jewish slaves, but cautioned the redeemer against paying excessive prices since that may encourage Roman captors to enslave more Jews. Josephus, himself a former 1st century slave, remarks that the faithfulness of Jewish slaves was appreciated by their owners; this may have been one of the main reasons for freeing them.

In the Middle Ages, redeeming Jewish slaves gained importance again and—up until the 19th century—Jewish congregations around the Mediterranean Sea formed societies dedicated to that purpose. Paul Johnson wrote, "Jews were particularly valued as captives since it was believed, usually correctly, that even if they themselves poor, a Jewish community somewhere could be persuaded to ransom them. ... In Venice, the Jewish Levantine and Portuguese congregations set up a special organization for redeeming Jewish captives taken by Christians from Turkish ships, Jewish merchants paid a special tax on all goods to support it, which acted as a form of insurance since they were likely victims."

== Modern era ==
=== Latin America and the Caribbean ===
Jews participated in the European colonization of the Americas, owning and trading black slaves in Latin America and the Caribbean, most notably in Brazil and Suriname, but also in Barbados and Jamaica. In Suriname, Jews owned many large plantations. This included an area known as “Jodensavanne” (Jewish Savannah), where roughly 40 sugarcane plantations housed a Jewish community numbering several hundred and up to 9000 slaves, until its destruction during an 1832 slave revolt.

Jewish participation in the trans-Atlantic slave trade was particularly pronounced in Dutch colonies, where “Jews can be said to have had tangible significance”, at one point controlling as much as 17% of Dutch Caribbean trade, according to historian Seymour Drescher. Professor of Judaic Studies, Marc Lee Raphael, has stated “[the] economic life of the Jewish community of Curaçao revolved around ownership of sugar plantations and the marketing of sugar, the importing of manufactured goods, and heavy involvement in the slave trade, within a decade of their arrival, Jews owned 80 percent of the Curaçao plantations”. This influence was significant enough that slave auctions scheduled on Jewish holidays would often be postponed.

=== Mediterranean slave trade ===
The Jews of Algiers were frequent purchasers of Christian slaves from Barbary corsairs. Meanwhile, Jewish brokers in Livorno, Italy, were instrumental in arranging the ransom of Christian slaves from Algiers to their home countries and freedom. Although one slave accused Livorno's Jewish brokers of holding the ransom until the captives died, this allegation is uncorroborated, and other reports indicate Jews as being very active in assisting the release of English Christian captives. In 1637, an exceptionally poor year for ransoming captives, the few slaves freed were ransomed largely by Jewish factors in Algiers working with Henry Draper.

=== Atlantic slave trade ===
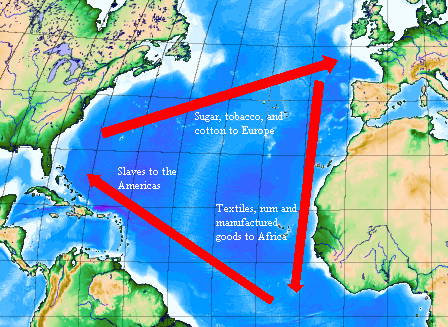
Triangular slave trade

The Atlantic slave trade transferred African slaves from Africa to colonies in the New World. Much of the slave trade followed a triangular route: slaves were transported from Africa to the Caribbean, sugar from there to North America or Europe, and manufactured goods from there to Africa. Jews and descendants of Jews participated in the slave trade on both sides of the Atlantic, in the Netherlands, Spain, and Portugal on the eastern side, and in Brazil, Caribbean, and North America on the west side.

After Spain and Portugal expelled many of their Jewish residents in the 1490s, many Jews from Spain and Portugal migrated to the Americas and to the Netherlands. Jewish participation in the Atlantic slave trade increased through the 17th century because Spain and Portugal maintained a dominant role in the Atlantic trade and peaked in the early 18th century, but started to decline after the British "emerged with the asiento [permission to sell slaves in Spanish possessions] at the Peace of Utrecht in 1713", and Spain and Portugal soon became superseded by Northern European merchants in participation in the slave trade. By the height of the Atlantic slave trade in the 18th century (spurred on in part due to increasing European demands for sugar), Jewish participation was minimised as the Northern European nations which held colonies in the Americas often refused to allow Jews among their number. Despite this, some Jewish immigrants to the Thirteen Colonies owned slaves on plantations in the Southern colonies.

==== Brazil ====
Slave ship used in Brazilian trade

The role of Jewish converts to Christianity (New Christians) and of Jewish traders was momentarily significant in Brazil and the Christian inhabitants of Brazil were envious because the Jews owned some of the best plantations in the river valley of Pernambuco, and some Jews were among the leading slave traders in the colony. Jews of Portuguese Brazilian origin did play a significant (but by no means dominant) role in the eighteenth-century slave trade of Rhode Island, but this sector accounted for only a very tiny portion of the total human exports from Africa.

==== Caribbean and Suriname ====
The New World location where Jews played the largest role in the slave-trade was in the Caribbean and Suriname, most notably in possessions of the Netherlands, that were serviced by the Dutch West India Company. The slave trade was one of the most important occupations of Jews living in Suriname and the Caribbean. The Jews of Suriname were the largest slave-holders in the region.

According to Austen, "the only places where Jews came close to dominating the New World plantation systems were Curaçao and Suriname." Slave auctions in the Dutch colonies were postponed if they fell on a Jewish holiday. Jewish merchants in the Dutch colonies acted as middlemen, buying slaves from the Dutch West India Company, and reselling them to plantation owners. The majority of buyers at slave auctions in the Brazil and the Dutch colonies were Jews. Jews allegedly played a "major role" in the slave trade in Barbados and Jamaica, and Jewish plantation owners in Suriname helped suppress several slave revolts between 1690 and 1722.

In Curaçao, Jews were involved in trading slaves, although at a lesser extent compared to the Protestants of the island. Jews imported fewer than 1,000 slaves to Curaçao between 1686 and 1710, after which the slave trade diminished. Between 1630 and 1770, Jewish merchants settled or handled "at least 15,000 slaves" who landed in Curaçao, about one-sixth of the total Dutch slave trade.

==== North American colonies ====
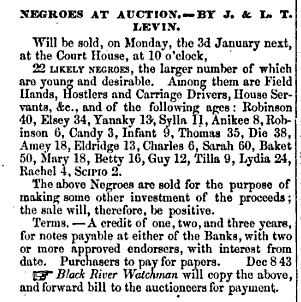
Advertisement for slave auction of slave trader Jacob Levin 8 December 1843

The Jewish role in the American slave trade was minimal. According to historian and rabbi Bertram Korn, there were Jewish owners of plantations, but altogether they constituted only a tiny proportion of the industry. In 1830 there were only four Jews among the 11,000 Southerners who owned fifty or more slaves.

Of all the shipping ports in Colonial America, only in Newport, Rhode Island, did Jewish merchants play a significant part in the slave trade.

A table of the commissions of brokers in Charleston, South Carolina, shows that one Jewish brokerage accounted for 4% of the commissions. According to Bertram Korn, Jews accounted for 4 of the 44 slave-brokers in Charleston, three of 70 in Richmond, and 1 of 12 in Memphis. However the proportion of Jewish residents of Charleston who owned slaves was similar to that of the general white population (83% versus 87% in 1830).

=== Assessing the extent of Jewish involvement in the Atlantic slave trade ===
Historian Seymour Drescher emphasized the problems of determining whether or not slave-traders were Jewish. He concludes that New Christian merchants managed to gain control of a sizeable share of all segments of the Portuguese Atlantic slave trade during the Iberian-dominated phase of the Atlantic system. Due to forcible conversions of Jews to Christianity many New Christians continued to practice Judaism in secret, meaning it is impossible for historians to determine what portion of these slave traders were Jewish, because to do so would require the historian to choose one of several definitions of "Jewish".

==== The Secret Relationship Between Blacks and Jews (book) ====
In 1991, the Nation of Islam (NOI) published The Secret Relationship Between Blacks and Jews, which alleged that Jews had dominated the Atlantic slave trade. Volume 1 of the book claims Jews played a major role in the Atlantic slave trade, and profited from slavery. The book was heavily criticized for being antisemitic, and for failing to provide any objective analysis of the role of Jews in the slave trade. Common criticisms included the book's selective quotations, "crude use of statistics", and that the book was purposefully trying to exaggerate the role of Jews. The Anti-Defamation League (ADL) criticized the NOI and the book. Henry Louis Gates Jr. criticized the book's intention and scholarship, alleging that the book "massively misrepresents the historical record".

Historian Ralph A. Austen heavily criticized the book and said that although the book may seem fairly accurate, it is an antisemitic book. However, he added that before the publication of The Secret Relationship, some scholars were reluctant to discuss Jewish involvement in slavery because of fear of damaging the "shared liberal agenda" of Jews and African Americans. In that sense, Austen found the book's aims of challenging the myth of universal Jewish benevolence throughout history to be legitimate even though the means to that end resulted in an antisemitic book.

==== Later assessments ====
The publication of The Secret Relationship spurred detailed research into the participation of Jews in the Atlantic slave trade, resulting in the publication of the following works, most of which were published specifically to refute the thesis of The Secret Relationship:

- 1992 – Harold Brackman, Jew on the brain: A public refutation of the Nation of Islam's The Secret relationship between Blacks and Jews
- 1992 – David Brion Davis, "Jews in the Slave Trade", in Culturefront (Fall 1 992), pp. 42–45
- 1993 – Seymour Drescher, "The Role of Jews in the Atlantic Slave Trade", Immigrants and Minorities, 12 (1993), pp. 113–125
- 1993 – Marc Caplan, Jew-Hatred As History: An Analysis of the Nation of Islam's "The Secret Relationship" (published by the Anti Defamation League)
- 1998 – Eli Faber, Jews, Slaves, and the Slave Trade: Setting the Record Straight, New York University Press
- 1999 – Saul S. Friedman, Jews and the American Slave Trade, Transaction

Most post-1991 scholars that analysed the role of Jews only identified certain regions (such as Brazil and the Caribbean) where the participation was "significant". Wim Klooster wrote: "In no period did Jews play a leading role as financiers, shipowners, or factors in the transatlantic or Caribbean slave trades. They possessed far fewer slaves than non-Jews in every British territory in North America and the Caribbean. Even when Jews in a handful of places owned slaves in proportions slightly above their representation among a town's families, such cases do not come close to corroborating the assertions of The Secret Relationship".

David Brion Davis wrote that "Jews had no major or continuing impact on the history of New World slavery." Jacob R. Marcus wrote that Jewish participation in the American Colonies was "minimal" and inconsistent. Bertram Korn wrote "all of the Jewish slavetraders in all of the Southern cities and towns combined did not buy and sell as many slaves as did the firm of Franklin and Armfield, the largest Negro traders in the South."

According to a review in The Journal of American History of both Jews, Slaves, and the Slave Trade: Setting the Record Straight and Jews and the American Slave Trade: "Faber acknowledges the few merchants of Jewish background locally prominent in slaving during the second half of the eighteenth century but otherwise confirms the small-to-minuscule size of colonial Jewish communities of any sort and shows them engaged in slaving and slave holding only to degrees indistinguishable from those of their English competitors."

According to Seymour Drescher, Jews participated in the Atlantic slave trade, particularly in Brazil and Suriname, however "in no period did Jews play a leading role as financiers, shipowners, or factors in the transatlantic or Caribbean slave trades" (Wim Klooster). He said that Jews rarely established new slave-trading routes, but rather worked in conjunction with a Christian partner, on trade routes that had been established by Christians and endorsed by Christian leaders of nations. In 1995 the American Historical Association (AHA) issued a statement, together with Drescher, condemning "any statement alleging that Jews played a disproportionate role in the Atlantic slave trade".

According to a review in The Journal of American History of Jews, Slaves, and the Slave Trade: Setting the Record Straight (Faber) and Jews and the American Slave Trade (Friedman), "Eli Faber takes a quantitative approach to Jews, Slaves, and the Slave Trade in Britain's Atlantic empire, starting with the arrival of Sephardic Jews in the London resettlement of the 1650s, calculating their participation in the trading companies of the late seventeenth century, and then using a solid range of standard quantitative sources (Naval Office shipping lists, censuses, tax records, and so on) to assess the prominence in slaving and slave owning of merchants and planters identifiable as Jewish in Barbados, Jamaica, New York, Newport, Philadelphia, Charleston, and all other smaller English colonial ports." Historian Ralph Austen, however, acknowledges "Sephardi Jews in the New World had been heavily involved in the African slave trade."

=== Jewish slave ownership in the southern United States ===
Slavery historian Jason H. Silverman describes the part of Jews in slave trading in the southern United states as "minuscule", and wrote that the historical rise and fall of slavery in the United States would not have been affected at all had there been no Jews living in the south. Jews accounted for only 1.25% of all Southern slave owners.

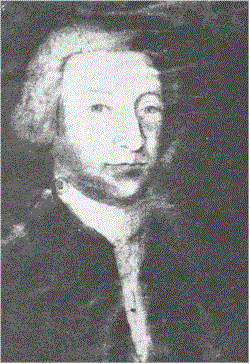
Aaron Lopez

Jewish slave ownership practices in the Southern United States were governed by regional practices, rather than Judaic law. Jews conformed to the prevailing patterns of slave ownership in the South, and were not significantly different from other slave owners in their treatment of slaves. Wealthy Jewish families in the American South generally preferred employing white servants rather than owning slaves. Jewish slave owners included Aaron Lopez, Francis Salvador, Judah Touro, and Haym Salomon.

Most Jewish slave owners were urban businessmen who used slaves for their domestic labor, while many non-Jewish slave owners used slaves for their agricultural labor on plantations. Jewish slave owners freed their black slaves at about the same rate as non-Jewish slave owners. Jewish slave owners sometimes bequeathed slaves to their children in their wills.

=== Abolitionist debate ===
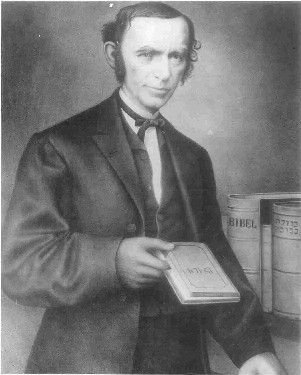
Abolitionist Rabbi David Einhorn

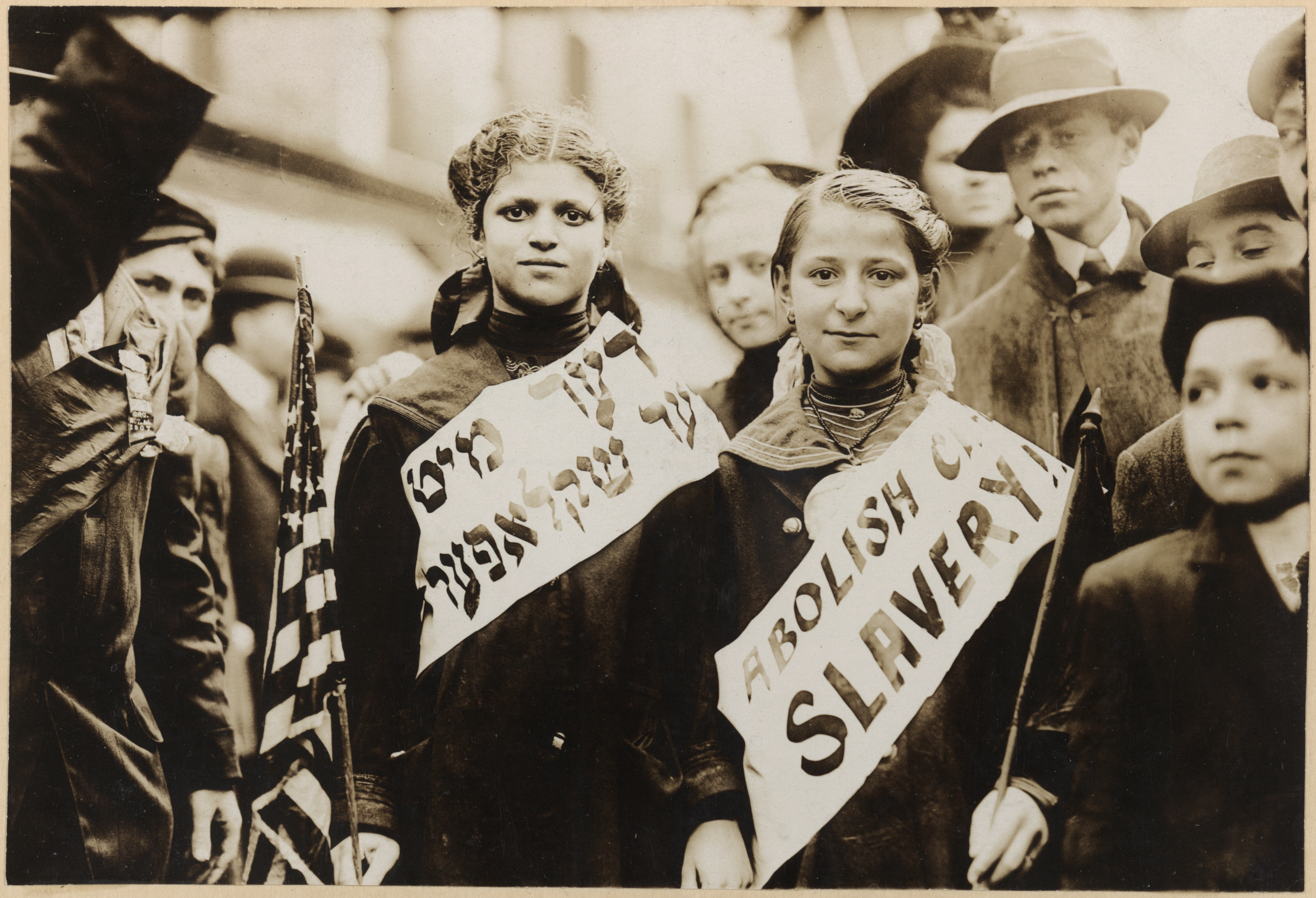
Two Jewish girls protesting against child slavery with signs in English and Yiddish

A significant number of Jews gave their energies to the antislavery movement. Many 19th century Jews, such as Adolphe Crémieux, participated in the moral outcry against slavery. In 1849, Crémieux announced the abolition of slavery throughout the French possessions.

In Britain, there were Jewish members of the abolition groups. Granville Sharp and Wilberforce, in his "A Letter on the Abolition of the Slave Trade", employed Jewish teachings as arguments against slavery. Rabbi G. Gottheil of Manchester, and Dr. L. Philippson of Bonn and Magdeburg, forcibly combated the view announced by Southern sympathizers that Judaism supports slavery. Rabbi M. Mielziner's anti-slavery work "Die Verhältnisse der Sklaverei bei den Alten Hebräern", published in 1859, was translated and published in the United States as "Slavery Among Hebrews". Similarly, in Germany, Berthold Auerbach in his fictional work "Das Landhaus am Rhein" aroused public opinion against slavery and the slave trade, and Heinrich Heine also spoke against slavery. Immigrant Jews were among abolitionist John Brown's band of antislavery fighters in Kansas, including Theodore Wiener (from Poland); Jacob Benjamin (from Bohemia), and August Bondi (1833–1907) from Vienna. Nathan Meyer Rothschild was known for his role in the British abolition of the slave trade through his partial financing of the £20 million British government compensation paid to former owners of the freed slaves.

A Jewish woman, Ernestine Rose, was called "queen of the platforms" in the 19th century because of her speeches in favor of abolition. Her lectures were met with controversy. Her most ill-received appearance was likely in Charleston, Virginia (today West Virginia), where her lecture on the evils of slavery was met with such vehement opposition and outrage that she was forced to exercise considerable caution to even get out of the city safely.

=== Pro-slavery Jews ===
In the Civil War era, prominent Jewish religious leaders in the United States engaged in public debates about slavery. Rabbis, especially those from the Southern states frequently supported slavery.

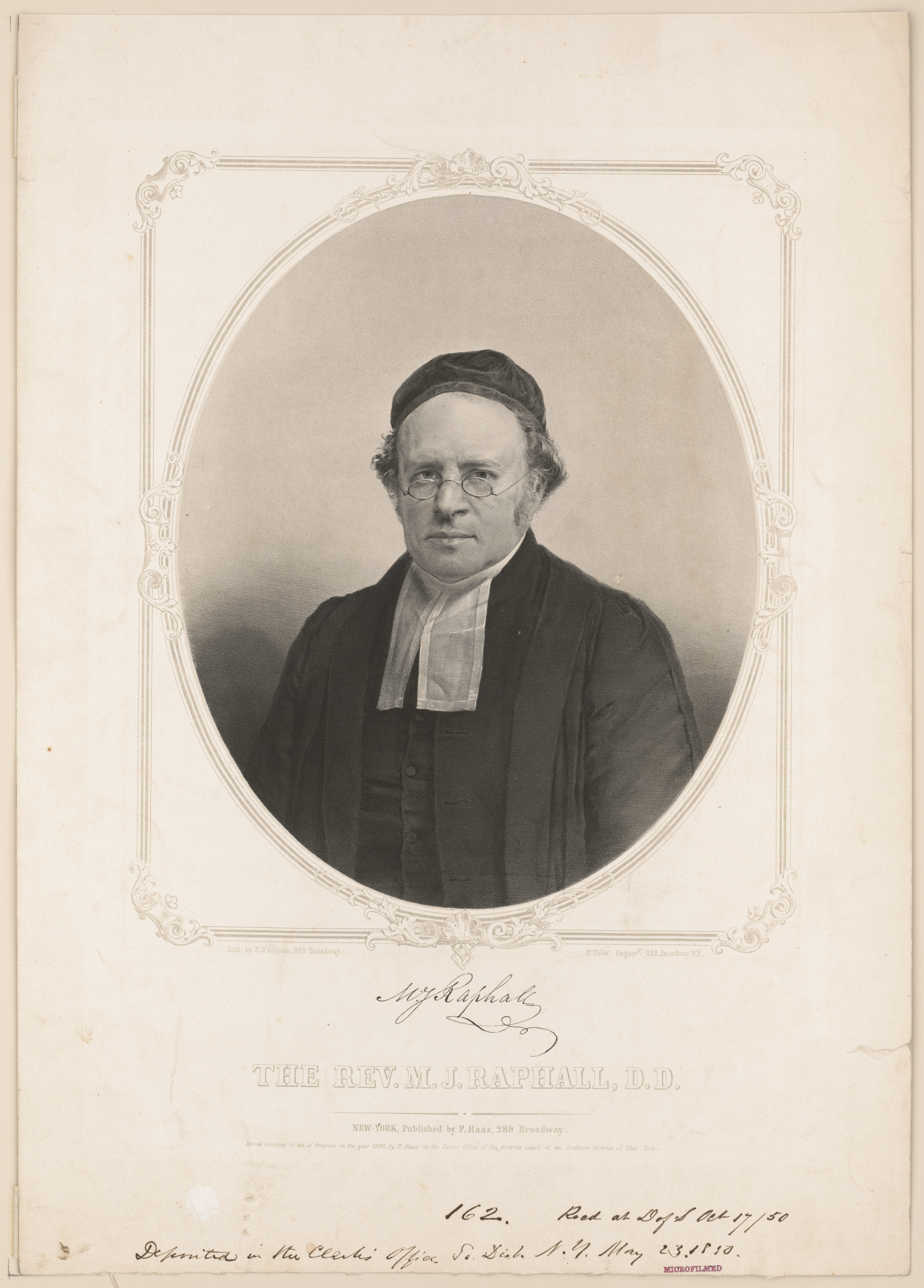
Morris Jacob Raphall (1850)

In 1861, the Charlotte Evening Bulletin noted: "It is a singular fact that the most masterly expositions which have lately been made of the constitutional and the religious argument for slavery are from gentlemen of the Hebrew faith". After referring to the speech of Judah Benjamin, the "most unanswerable speech on the rights of the South ever made in the Senate", it refers to the lecture of Rabbi Raphall, "a discourse which stands like the tallest peak of the Himmalohs [sic]—immovable and incomparable".

Jewish Americans expressed a range of opinions on slavery, with different leaders and communities debating the issue in sermons, writings, and public discussions.The most notable debate was between Rabbi Morris Jacob Raphall, who defended slavery as it was practiced in the South because slavery was endorsed by the Bible, and rabbi David Einhorn, who opposed its current form. However, there were not many Jews in the South, and Jews accounted for only 1.25% of all Southern slave owners. In 1861, Raphall published his views in a treatise called "The Bible View of Slavery". Raphall and other pro-slavery rabbis such as Isaac Leeser and J. M. Michelbacher (both of Virginia), used the Tanakh (Jewish Bible) to support their arguments.

Abolitionist rabbis, including Einhorn and Michael Heilprin, concerned that Raphall's position would be seen as the official policy of American Judaism, vigorously rebutted his arguments, and argued that slavery—as practiced in the South—was immoral and not endorsed by Judaism.

Ken Yellis, writing in The Forward, has suggested that "the majority of American Jews were mute on the subject, perhaps because they dreaded its tremendous corrosive power. Prior to 1861, there are virtually no instances of rabbinical sermons on slavery, probably due to fear that the controversy would trigger a sectional conflict in which Jewish families would be arrayed on opposite sides. ... America's largest Jewish community, New York's Jews, were overwhelmingly pro-southern, pro-slavery, and anti-Lincoln in the early years of the war." However, as the war progressed, "and the North's military victories mounted, feelings began to shift toward[s] ... the Union and eventually, emancipation."

=== Contemporary times ===
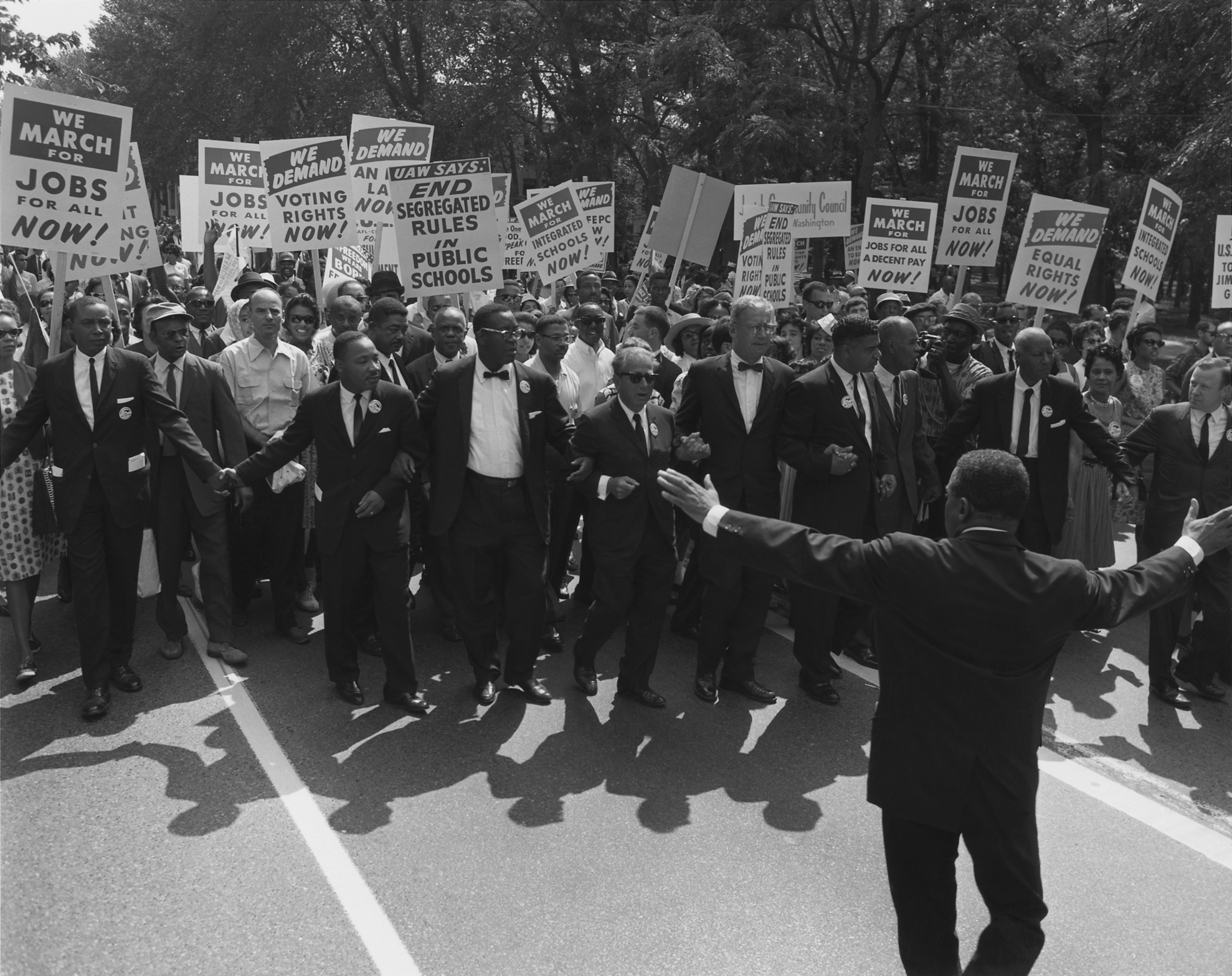
Jewish civil rights activist Joseph L. Rauh Jr. marching with Martin Luther King Jr. in 1963

Jews and African-Americans cooperated during the Civil Rights Movement, motivated partially by the common background of slavery, particularly the story of the Jewish enslavement in Egypt, as told in the Biblical story of the Book of Exodus, which many blacks identified with. Seymour Siegel suggests that the historic struggle against prejudice faced by Jews led to a natural sympathy for any people confronting discrimination. Joachim Prinz, president of the American Jewish Congress, spoke from the podium at the Lincoln Memorial during the March on Washington for Jobs and Freedom in 1963, where he emphasized how Jews identify deeply with African American disenfranchisement "born of our own painful historic experience", including slavery and ghettoization.

Rabbi Jonathan Sacks wrote that while the Torah does not say to abolish slavery, the Torah's value system implicitly sets into motion an eventual end to slavery. The Forward and The Jewish Quarterly similarly conclude that while the Torah does not forbid slavery, slavery is not acceptable in modern Judaism.

Rabbi Avigdor Miller argued that slavery was an ennobling institution and should not have been abolished, and said that the institution of slavery among Jews and in America was approved by the Torah and compatible with Judaism.

== See also ==
- The Bible and slavery
- The Bible and violence
- Christianity and slavery
- Christianity and violence
- Judaism and violence
- Louis Farrakhan
- History of Christian thought on persecution and tolerance
- History of concubinage in the Muslim world
- History of slavery
- History of slavery in the Muslim world
- Islam and violence
- Islamic views on slavery
- Judaism and violence
- Aaron Lopez
- Mormonism and slavery
- Mormonism and violence
- Pidyon Shvuyim
- Racism in the Arab world
- Racism in Israel
- Racism in Jewish communities
- Racism in Muslim communities
- Slavery and religion
- Slavery in 21st-century jihadism
- Slavery in ancient Egypt
- Slavery in ancient Greece
- Slavery in ancient Rome
- Slavery in antiquity
- Slavery in Brazil
- Slavery in colonial Spanish America
- Slavery in contemporary Africa
- Slavery in medieval Europe
- Malik Zulu Shabazz
- Slavery in the United States
- Slavery in the 21st century
- Xenophobia and racism in the Middle East
