= African American–Jewish relations =

Relations between Blacks and Jews in America

African Americans and Jewish Americans have interacted throughout much of the history of the United States. This relationship has included widely publicized cooperation and conflict, and it has been an area of significant academic research since the 1970s. Cooperation during the Civil Rights Movement was strategic and significant, culminating in the Civil Rights Act of 1964.

The relationship has also featured conflicts and controversies which are related to such topics as the Black Power movement, Zionism, affirmative action, and the antisemitic trope concerning the alleged dominant role of American and Caribbean-based Jews in the Atlantic slave trade.

== History ==
In the Americas, interactions between Black people and Jews began during European colonization in the early modern period. Black Africans first arrived in America in the 16th century. Captives from West and Central Africa were sold to European slave traders who transported them across the Atlantic to the Americas, where they were sold to local slaveowners. A few of them were able to gain their freedom through manumission or they were able to gain their freedom by escaping from their enslavers and after they gained their freedom, they founded independent communities both before and during the American Revolution.

Early Jewish communities which existed in what became the United States were primarily Sephardic (Jews of Spanish and Portuguese descent). Many of them were refugees and immigrants from Brazil, Amsterdam, or England. They settled in cities such as New York City, Providence, Rhode Island, Charleston, South Carolina, and Savannah, Georgia, gradually integrating themselves into the local society. Slavery was a long-established institution in the colonies, and as a result, some Jews became slaveholders, especially in the South. Contrary to the conspiracy theory that Jews played an outsized role in the slave trade, Jews only comprised 1.25% of all Southern slaveowners. For the most part, American Jews did not feel any sense of responsibility for the larger society around them until the late 19th century. When they finally did so, Southern Jews lagged far behind Northern Jews.

Like many Christians who lived at that time, some Jews also used the Bible to justify the enslavement of Black people based on historical and scientific racism. For instance, a Jewish editor named Jacob N. Cardozo explained that "the reason the Almighty had made the colored black" was to mark him as inferior, providing an obvious, God-given approval of slavery. This scientific racism often characterized people as belonging to three broad categories or races: Caucasian, Mongoloid or Negroid. So, although Jews were often considered "other" and separate from European Christians, the Naturalization Act of 1790 classed them as "free white persons" and thus full citizens, unlike Native Americans, Africans, Pacific Islanders, and non-white Asians.

After the United States was founded in 1776, most Black people continued to be enslaved, especially in the American South; four million slaves were liberated only during and at the end of the Civil War in 1865. During Reconstruction, they gained citizenship and, in the case of adult males, the right to vote. Due to the widespread policy and ideology of white supremacy, however, Black Americans were treated as second-class citizens and soon found themselves disenfranchised in the South.

=== 20th century ===
In the late 19th and early 20th centuries, millions of Ashkenazi Jews from Eastern Europe immigrated to the United States for social and economic opportunities due to widespread violent pogroms in their countries of residence. They mainly settled in New York and other major cities.

In the Great Migration of the 1910s, Southern Black people began large-scale migration to Northern cities, where many Jews had already settled, in order to escape peonage and second-class citizenship.

Black people related to the Jews, seeing connections between slavery in America and the biblical accounts of the Israelites in Egypt. Northern Jews also began to see similar connections and began to express sympathy for the plight of Black Americans:

In the early 1900s, Jewish newspapers drew parallels between the Black movement out of the South and the Jews' escape from Egypt, pointing out that both Blacks and Jews lived in ghettos, and calling anti-Black riots in the South "pogroms". Stressing the similarities rather than the differences between the Jewish and Black experience in America, Jewish leaders emphasized the idea that both groups would benefit the more America moved toward a society of merit, free of religious, ethnic and racial restrictions.

The American Jewish Committee, the American Jewish Congress, and the Anti-Defamation League were central to the campaign against racial prejudice. Jews made substantial financial contributions to many civil rights organizations, including the NAACP, the Urban League, the Congress of Racial Equality, and the Student Nonviolent Coordinating Committee.

In the early 1900s, Northern Jewish daily and weekly publications, many of them holding radical and secular views, often reported on violence against Black people at a time when non-Jewish publications would not. Some writers in these publications compared the anti-black violence in the South to the deadly anti-Jewish pogroms in the Russian Empire, even though other Jewish writers strongly objected to such comparisons.

Despite many publications taking an anti-racist stance, coverage in Jewish periodicals could be deeply ambivalent: It was often inspired by principles of justice and by a desire to change racist policies in the United States, but it sometimes used racist language, occasionally blamed Black people for their own oppression (including racist incidents such as the Tulsa massacre), and sometimes was paternalistic. Some of the ambivalence was motivated, as Uri Schreter puts it, by "anxieties about Black violence". At the same time, African-American writers often portrayed Jewish people through the lens of capitalism and exploitation of Black labor, and many Jews felt that the comparisons that Black people drew between themselves and Jews were offensive.

During this period, notable Northern Jewish leaders invested time, influence and economic resources into Black endeavors, supporting civil rights, philanthropy, social service, and organizing. Historian Hasia Diner notes that "they made sure that their actions were well publicized" as part of an effort to demonstrate increasing Jewish political clout.

Julius Rosenwald was a Northern Jewish philanthropist who donated a large part of his fortune to supporting Black education in the South by providing matching funds for construction of schools in rural areas. Northern Jews played a major role in the National Association for the Advancement of Colored People (NAACP) in its early decades. Northern Jews involved in the NAACP included Joel Elias Spingarn (its first chairman), Arthur B. Spingarn, and founder Henry Moskowitz. More recently, Jack Greenberg was a leader in the organization.

On the other hand, African Americans also experienced racism and shock from newly arrived Jewish immigrants from Eastern Europe, and they faced a lack of support from Jews in the South. Critics such as Albert Lindemann have argued that pro-black attitudes amongst Southern Jews in this time period would have provoked fierce opposition from Christian white Southerners.

Southern Jewish attitudes towards Black people only started to change in 1915, when the much publicized lynching of Leo Frank, a Jew, in Georgia by a mob of white Southerners caused many Southern Jews to "become acutely conscious of the similarities and differences between themselves and blacks." Some began feeling an increased sense of solidarity with Black people, as the trial exposed widespread antisemitism in Georgia.

However, the trial also pitted Jews against Black people because Frank's Jewish defense attorneys excluded Black jurors and exploited anti-black racism by shifting the blame for the murder of Mary Phagan, a white girl, to Jim Conley, a Black janitor and witness against Frank. Frank's lead attorney, Luther Rosser, called Conley a "dirty, filthy, black, drunken, lying nigger." Although many historians since the late 20th century have concluded that Conley did murder Phagan, most Southern Jews were quite racist towards Black people at the time and took advantage of their higher social status.

Baruch Charney Vladeck reported that, although he didn't see Jews attack Black people in the South, he did see them smile when Black people were assaulted, and argued that Jews ignored their "‘vayse’ privilegn" ("white" privilege). However, he felt that the lynching of Frank could improve relations with Black people, writing:

Now, when the white body of one of ours has been hung upon a tree, we will perhaps understand that the blacks feel every day what we have felt for only one day and become better citizens.

==== After World War I & World War II ====
Marcus Garvey (1887–1940) was an early promoter of pan-Africanism and African redemption and led the Universal Negro Improvement Association and African Communities League. His push to celebrate Africa as the original homeland of African Americans led many Jews to compare Garvey to leaders of Zionism. An example of this was that Garvey wanted World War I peace negotiators to turn over former German colonies in southwest Africa to Black people. In that period, Zionists were promoting a "return of Jews" after 2,000 years to the historic homeland of Israel, stressing self-determination for former colonies. At the same time, Garvey regularly criticized Jews in his columns in his newspaper Negro World for allegedly trying to destroy the Black population of America.

After World War II, Federal Housing Authority policy restricted certain neighborhoods to people of the "same social and racial classes". While some of these neighborhoods excluded them based on charter, Jews were usually permitted to move into white areas, while Black people were not. This reinforced segregation at the time and deepened the economic, social and political inequalities between African Americans and other ethnic groups, including Jews.

==== During the Civil rights movement ====
By the middle of the 20th century, many Southern Jews were supportive of the Civil Rights Movement. About 50 percent of the civil-rights attorneys in the South during the 1960s were Jews, as were over 50 percent of the whites who went to Mississippi in 1964 to challenge Jim Crow laws. These pro-black Southern Jews tended to keep a low profile on "the race issue" in order to avoid attracting the attention of the anti-black (and antisemitic) Ku Klux Klan.

However, Klan groups exploited the issue of Black integration and Jewish involvement in the struggle in order to commit violently antisemitic hate crimes. As an example of this hatred, in one year alone, from November 1957 to October 1958, temples and other Jewish communal gatherings were bombed and desecrated in Atlanta, Nashville, Jacksonville, and Miami, and dynamite was found under synagogues in Birmingham, Charlotte, and Gastonia. Some rabbis received death threats, although there were no injuries following these outbursts of violence.

== Commercial and residential relations ==
Following the Civil War, Jewish shop-owners and landlords engaged in business with Black customers and tenants, often filling a need where non-Jewish, white business owners would not venture. This was true in most regions of the South, where Jews were often merchants in its small cities, as well as Northern urban cities such as New York, where they settled in high numbers. Jewish shop-owners tended to be more civil than other white people to Black customers, treating them with more dignity. Black people frequently had more immediate contact with Jewish people than they had with white Christians.

In 1903, Black historian W. E. B. Du Bois described the disparity which existed between Black people and Jews in the South, describing the latter, who frequently worked as landlords, as successors of the slave-barons. In the 1953 edition, he changed the text by replacing the word "Jew" with the words "immigrant" and "foreigner", explaining, "What, of course, I meant to condemn was the exploitation of Black labor and that it was in this country and at that time in part a matter of immigrant Jews, was incidental and not essential. My inner sympathy with the Jewish people was expressed better in the last paragraph of page 152. But this illustrates how easily one slips into unconscious condemnation of a whole group. Du Bois also publicly spoke out against antisemitism for decades.

Black novelist James Baldwin (1924–1987), who grew up in Harlem in the years between the world wars, also highlighted the visibility of Jewish landlords as a cause of antisemitism in the Black community. In the essay "Negroes Are Anti-Semitic Because They're Anti-White", in which he critiqued Black antisemitism, he noted the fact that many landlords, grocers, butchers and pawnbrokers in Harlem were Jews, and he also noted the fact that this situation represented Black people's daily experience not just of white people but of capitalism as well. As a result of these interactions, and the ongoing economic inequalities that Black people faced, he explained, many Black people wrongly "hated them [Jews]." He went on to end the article with a clear condemnation of antisemitism:

I also know that if today I refuse to hate Jews, or anybody else, it is because I know how it feels to be hated. I learned this from Christians, and I ceased to practice what the Christians practiced. The crisis taking place in the world, and in the minds and hearts of black men everywhere, is not produced by the star of David, but by the old, rugged Roman cross on which Christendom's most celebrated Jew was murdered. And not by Jews.

Despite his expression of this sentiment, the incendiary title and language of the essay earned him accusations of antisemitism. In his response, "Negroes Are Anti-Semitic Because They Want a Scapegoat; A Reply to James Baldwin", Robert Gordis described Baldwin's essay as "a passionate justification of Negro anti-Semitism." Later, Rabbi Samuel Silver said of Baldwin, "Like other Negro extremists, he has allowed his hostility to whites to run into extra-hostility to Jews, despite the fact that Jews were among the leaders of those championing the cause of the Negro."

Terrence L. Johnson and Jacques Berlinerblau have argued that Baldwin's intent was to take aim at "racial capitalism". Baldwin would write other accounts of Jews that were similarly sympathetic and which would clarify that his target was "not Jews", but the capitalist systems that exploited Black people:

The first white man I ever saw was the Jewish manager who arrived to collect the rent, and he collected the rent because he did not own the building. I never, in fact, saw any of the people who owned any of the buildings in which we scrubbed and suffered for so long, until I was a grown man and famous. None of them were Jews. And I was not stupid: the grocer and the druggist were Jews, for example, and they were very very nice to me, and to us... I knew a murderer when I saw one, and the people who were trying to kill me were not Jews.

Like Baldwin, Martin Luther King Jr. suggested that some black antisemitism arose from the tensions of landlord-tenant relations. He acknowledged the fact that "irrational statements" were made against Jews by Black people, blaming them on the dire situation of Black people in areas like Chicago:

When we were working in Chicago, we had numerous rent strikes on the West Side, and it was unfortunately true that, in most instances, the persons we had to conduct these strikes against were Jewish landlords... We were living in a slum apartment owned by a Jew and a number of others, and we had to have a rent strike. We were paying $94 for four run-down, shabby rooms, and .... we discovered that whites ... were paying only $78 a month. We were paying 20 percent tax. The Negro ends up paying a color tax, and this has happened in instances where Negroes actually confronted Jews as the landlord or the storekeeper. The irrational statements that have been made are the result of these confrontations.

== Entertainment ==
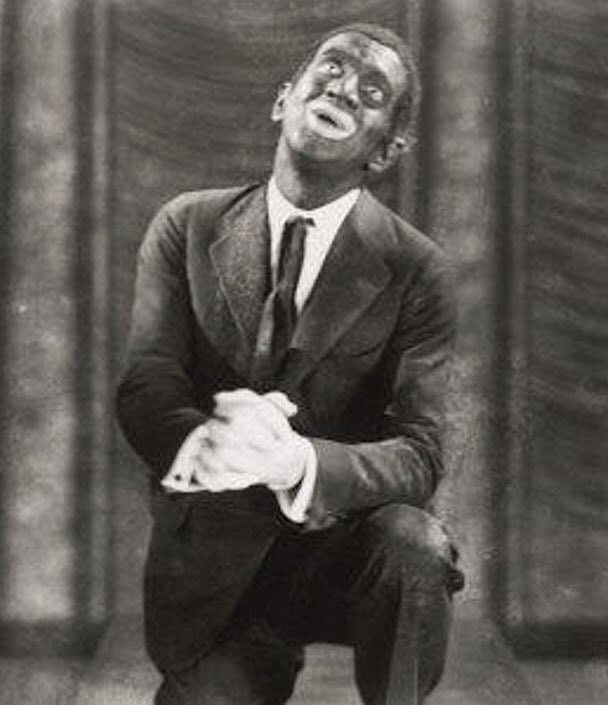
Al Jolson in The Jazz Singer (1927)

Jewish producers in the United States entertainment industry produced many works on Black subjects in the film industry, Broadway, and the music industry. Many portrayals of Black people were sympathetic, but historian Michael Rogin has discussed how some of the treatments were racist and could be considered exploitative.

Rogin also analyzes the instances when Jewish actors, such as Al Jolson, portrayed Black people in blackface. He suggests that these were deliberately racist portrayals, and that they were also expressions of the culture at the time. Black people were prohibited from appearing in leading roles in either the theatre or in movies, and blackface performances were relatively common. Despite this, Rogin argues that Jewish blackface did not cause significant tensions at the time, saying: "Jewish blackface neither signified a distinctive Jewish racism nor produced a distinctive black anti-Semitism".

Jews often drew on Black culture in film, music, and plays. Historian Jeffrey Melnick argues that Jewish artists such as Irving Berlin and George Gershwin created the myth that they were the proper interpreters of Black culture, "elbowing out 'real' Black Americans in the process." Black academic Harold Cruse viewed the arts scene as a white-dominated misrepresentation of Black culture, epitomized by works like Gershwin's opera Porgy and Bess.

Evidence from Black musicians and critics suggests that Jews in the music business played an important role in paving the way for mainstream acceptance of Black culture, although Black people and Jews didn't benefit from this acceptance equally. Melnick concludes that, "while both Jews and African-Americans contributed to the rhetoric of musical affinity, the fruits of this labor belonged exclusively to the former."

Some Black people also have criticized Jewish movie producers for portraying them in a racist manner. In 1990, at an NAACP convention in Los Angeles, Legrand Clegg, founder of the Coalition Against Black Exploitation, a pressure group that lobbied against negative screen images of African Americans, alleged:

[T]he century-old problem of Jewish racism in Hollywood denies blacks access to positions of power in the industry and portrays blacks in a derogatory manner: "If Jewish leaders can complain of black anti-Semitism, our leaders should certainly raise the issue of the century-old problem of Jewish racism in Hollywood.... No Jewish people ever attacked or killed black people. But we're concerned with Jewish producers who degrade the black image. It's a genuine concern. And when we bring it up, our statements are distorted and we're dragged through the press as anti-Semites.

Professor Leonard Jeffries echoed those comments in a 1991 speech at the Empire State Plaza Black Arts & Cultural Festival in Albany, New York. Jeffries said that Russian Jews and the Mafia controlled the film industry, using it to paint a negative stereotype of Black people.

Jewish Americans are noted for playing a significant role in jazz, a musical genre created and originally developed by African Americans. This is largely attributed to aligning through persecution, as Jews were not considered fully American or white throughout the 1920s and 1930s. Willie "The Lion" Smith, Slim Gaillard, Cab Calloway, and other Black musicians played Jewish and Jewish-themed songs. Meanwhile, Jewish Jazz was an attempt to combine Jewish music and jazz into a new genre.

== Alliances during the civil rights movement ==
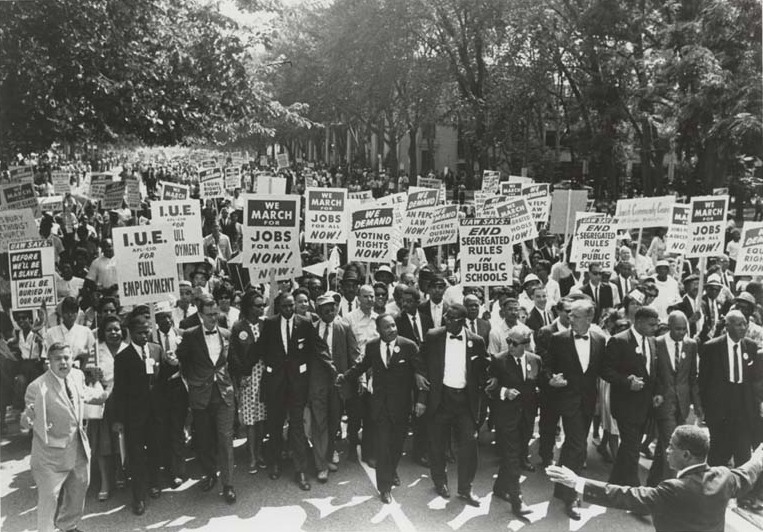
Joachim Prinz with Martin Luther King Jr. at the 1963 March on Washington for Jobs and Freedom. Prinz spoke just before King's "I Have a Dream" speech.

During the civil rights movement (1954–1968), American Jews and African Americans formed strategic alliances to challenge racial inequality and injustice across the country. This built on earlier solidarity between the two communities, which had resulted in, among other things, Jewish activists taking many of the leadership positions within the early NAACP. Jewish individuals and organizations provided financial support, legal expertise, and grassroots activism to support the growing movement nationwide. Prominent Jewish organizations involved in this "Grand Alliance" included the Anti-Defamation League and the American Jewish Congress. Prominent Jewish leaders such as Rabbi Abraham Joshua Heschel and Jack Greenberg marched alongside figures like Martin Luther King Jr. and contributed significantly to landmark legal victories.

While this period is sometimes remembered as a "golden age" of African American–Jewish relations, modern scholars point out that there were still disagreements and tensions between Black people and Jews at the time. The reasons for collaborating were also diverse, and often motivated by politics as much as moral, ethical and religious concerns. Since the 1960s, despite disagreements on issues such as affirmative action in higher education, both Black and Jewish communities and community leaders have collaborated on general and specific campaigns to tackle discrimination.

=== Joseph Gelders ===
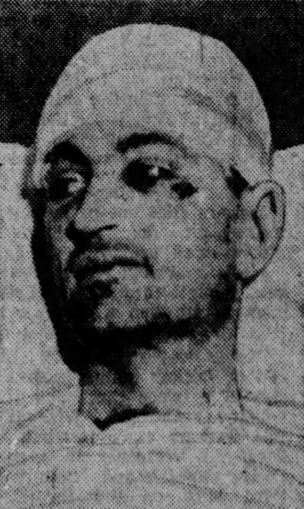
Gelders recovering in a Clayton, Alabama, hospital

A 1934 miner strike that led to the killing of several Black miners was the catalyst for physicist Joseph Gelders' civil-rights activism and labor-organizing efforts. Gelders and his wife, Esther, started to host a weekly discussion group for students at the University of Alabama at Birmingham. He established an Alabama committee that worked on the Scottsboro Boys case.

Due to his efforts, Gelders was kidnapped and assaulted by members of the Ku Klux Klan on September 23, 1936. Gelders and suffragist Lucy Randolph Mason established the Southern Conference for Human Welfare in 1938. In 1941, Gelders and activist Virginia Foster Durr led the creation of the National Committee to Abolish the Poll Tax.

=== The "golden age" ===
Cooperation between Jewish and African-American organizations peaked after World War II—sometimes, it is called the "golden age" of the relationship. The leaders of each group jointly worked to launch a movement for racial equality in the United States, and Jews funded and led some national civil-rights organizations. After he visited the eviscerated Warsaw Ghetto, African-American civil-rights leader W. E. B. Du Bois wrote testimonies and op-eds for Jewish publications that decried the Nazi violence in Europe.

Historically, Black colleges and universities hired Jewish refugee professors who were not given comparable jobs in white institutions because wider American culture was antisemitic. This era of cooperation culminated in the passage of the Civil Rights Act of 1964, which outlawed racial and religious discrimination in schools and other public facilities, and the passage of the Voting Rights Act of 1965, which prohibited discriminatory voting practices and authorized the government to oversee and review state voting practices.

Historian Cheryl Greenberg notes that one narrative of the relationship says: "It is significant that ... a disproportionate number of white civil rights activists were [Jewish] as well. Jewish agencies engaged with their African American counterparts in a more sustained and fundamental way than other white groups did largely because their constituents and their understanding of Jewish values and Jewish self-interest pushed them in that direction."

The extent of Jewish participation in the civil-rights movement frequently correlated with their branch of Judaism: Reform Jews participated more frequently than Orthodox Jews. Many Reform Jews were guided by values that were reflected in the Reform branch's Pittsburgh Platform, which urged Jews to "participate in the great task of modern times, to solve, on the basis of justice and righteousness, the problems presented by the contrasts and evils of the present organization of society."

Religious leaders such as rabbis and ministers of Black Baptist churches frequently played key roles in the civil-rights movement, including Abraham Joshua Heschel, who marched with Martin Luther King Jr. during the Selma to Montgomery marches. To commemorate this moment, representatives from the Coalition of Conscience, the King Center for Nonviolent Social Change, the American Jewish Committee, the Anti-Defamation League of B'nai B'rith (now the ADL) and the Atlanta Board of Education marched together again 20 years later.

Sixteen Jewish leaders were arrested while they were heeding King's call to participate in the June 1964 Monson Motor Lodge protests in St. Augustine, Florida. It was the occasion of the largest mass arrest of rabbis in American history. Marc Schneier, president of the Foundation for Ethnic Understanding, wrote Shared Dreams: Martin Luther King Jr. and the Jewish Community (1999), recounting the historic relationship between African Americans and Jewish Americans as a way to encourage a return to strong ties following years of animosity that reached its apex during the Crown Heights riot in Brooklyn, New York.

Northern and Western Jews frequently supported desegregation in their communities and schools, even at the risk of diluting the unity of their close-knit Jewish communities, which were frequently a critical component of Jewish life.

==== Murder of Jewish civil rights activists ====
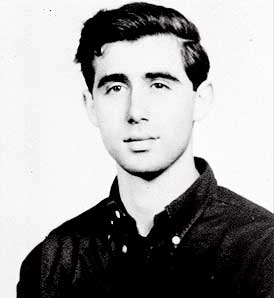
Andrew Goodman

The summer of 1964 was designated the Freedom Summer, and many Jews from the North and West traveled to the South to participate in a concentrated voter registration effort. Two Jewish activists, Andrew Goodman and Michael Schwerner, and one Black activist, James Chaney, were murdered by the Ku Klux Klan near Philadelphia, Mississippi, as a result of their participation. Their deaths were considered martyrdom by some, and, as a result, Black–Jewish relations were temporarily strengthened.

In 1965, Martin Luther King Jr., said,

How could there be anti-Semitism among Negroes when our Jewish friends have demonstrated their commitment to the principle of tolerance and brotherhood not only in the form of sizable contributions, but in many other tangible ways, and often at great personal sacrifice. Can we ever express our appreciation to the rabbis who chose to give moral witness with us in St. Augustine during our recent protest against segregation in that unhappy city? Need I remind anyone of the awful beating suffered by Rabbi Arthur Lelyveld of Cleveland when he joined the civil rights workers there in Hattiesburg, Mississippi? And who can ever forget the sacrifice of two Jewish lives, Andrew Goodman and Michael Schwerner, in the swamps of Mississippi? It would be impossible to record the contribution that the Jewish people have made toward the Negro's struggle for freedom—it has been so great.

=== Refuting the idealism of the "golden age" ===
Some recent scholarship suggests that the "golden age" (1955–1966) of the Black–Jewish relationship was not as ideal as it is often portrayed.

Philosopher and activist Cornel West said, "There was no golden age in which blacks and Jews were free of tension and friction". West said that this period of Black–Jewish cooperation is frequently downplayed by Black people and is frequently romanticized by Jews: "It is downplayed by blacks because they focus on the astonishingly rapid entry of most Jews into the middle and upper middle classes during this brief period—an entry that has spawned... resentment from a quickly growing Black impoverished class. Jews, on the other hand, tend to romanticize this period because their present status as upper middle dogs and some top dogs in American society unsettles their historic self-image as progressives with a compassion for the underdog."

Historian Melanie Kaye/Kantrowitz points out that the number of non-Southern Jews who went to the Southern states only numbered a few hundred, and she also points out that the "relationship was frequently out of touch, periodically at odds, with both sides failing to understand each other's point of view."

Political scientist Andrew Hacker wrote about the disparity between Jewish and Black experiences of the civil rights movement:

It is more than a little revealing that Whites who travelled south in 1964 referred to their sojourn as their 'Mississippi summer'. It is as if all the efforts of the local blacks for voter registration and the desegregation of public facilities had not even existed until white help arrived... Of course, this was done with benign intentions, as if to say 'we have come in answer to your calls for assistance'. The problem was... the condescending tone... For Jewish liberals, the great memory of that summer has been the deaths of Andrew Goodman and Michael Schwerner and—almost as an afterthought—James Chaney. Indeed, Chaney's name tends to be listed last, as if the life he lost was only worth three fifths of the others.

Hacker also quoted author Julius Lester, who was an African-American convert to Judaism, as writing:

Jews tend to be a little self-righteous about their liberal record, ... we realize that they were pitying us and wanted our gratitude, not the realization of the principles of justice and humanity... Blacks consider [Jews] paternalistic. Black people have destroyed the previous relationship which they had with the Jewish community, in which we were the victims of a kind of paternalism, which is only a benevolent racism.

In "The Complex Relationship between Jews and African Americans in the Context of the Civil Rights Movement", Hannah Labovitz argues, "this is not a story about white Jews intervening to save the day after experiencing their own challenges, but rather one damaged community doing what it could to help another."

=== Black Power movement ===
By 1966, Jews were increasingly transitioning to middle-class and upper-class status, creating a gap in relations between Jews and Black people. At the same time, many Black leaders, including some leaders of the Black Power movement, became outspoken in their demands for greater equality, frequently criticizing Jews along with other white targets.

In 1966, the Student Nonviolent Coordinating Committee (SNCC) voted to exclude whites from its leadership, a decision that resulted in the expulsion of several Jewish leaders.

In 1967, Black academic Harold Cruse attacked Jewish activism in his 1967 volume The Crisis of the Negro Intellectual, in which he argued that Jews had become a problem for Black people precisely because they had so identified with the Black struggle. Cruse insisted that Jewish involvement in interracial politics impeded the emergence of "Afro-American ethnic consciousness". For Cruse, as well as for other Black activists, the role of American Jews as political mediators between Black people and whites was "fraught with serious dangers to all concerned" and it must be "terminated by Negroes themselves."

=== Southern Jews' response to the civil rights movement ===
The vast majority of civil rights activism by American Jews was undertaken by Jews from the Northern and Western states. Jews in the Southern states engaged in virtually no organized activities on behalf of civil rights. This lack of participation was puzzling to some Northern Jews, due to the "inability of the northern Jewish leaders to see that Jews, before the battle for desegregation, were not generally victims in the South and that the racial caste system in the south situated Jews favorably in the Southern mind, or 'whitened' them." However, there were some Northern Jews who participated in the civil-rights movement as individuals.

From 1946 until his death in 1973, Rabbi Jacob M. Rothschild was the rabbi of Atlanta's oldest and most prominent synagogue, The Hebrew Benevolent Congregation, also known as "the Temple", where he distinguished himself by speaking out as an outspoken proponent of civil rights. Upon his arrival in Atlanta (after living in Pittsburgh for most of his life), Rabbi Rothschild was disturbed by the depth of the racial injustice which he witnessed, and he resolved to make civil rights a focal point of his rabbinical career. He first broached the topic of civil rights in his 1947 Rosh Hashanah sermon, but he remained mindful of his status as an outsider and, during his first few years in Atlanta, he proceeded with caution in order to avoid alienating his supporters. By 1954, however, when the U.S. Supreme Court issued its Brown v. Board of Education decision, which called for the desegregation of public schools, race relations had become a recurring theme of his sermons, and Temple members had grown accustomed to his support of civil rights.

At the same time, he reached out to members of the local Christian clergy and he also became active in civic affairs, joining the Atlanta Council on Human Relations, the Georgia Council of Human Relations, the Southern Regional Council, the Urban League, and the National Conference of Christians and Jews. In order to promote cooperation with his Christian colleagues, Rothschild established the Institute for the Christian Clergy, an annual daylong event that was hosted by the Temple each February. Black ministers were always welcome at the Temple's interfaith events, and, on other occasions, Rothschild invited prominent Black leaders, such as Morehouse College president Benjamin Mays, to lead educational luncheons at the Temple, despite objections from some members of his congregation.

In 1957, when other Southern cities were erupting in violent opposition to court-ordered school desegregation, eighty Atlanta ministers issued a statement in which they called for interracial negotiation, obedience to the law, and a peaceful resolution to the integration disputes that threatened Atlanta's moderate reputation. The Ministers' Manifesto, as the statement came to be known, marked an important turning point in Atlanta's race relations. Although the Manifesto's strong Christian language prevented Rothschild from signing it himself, the rabbi assisted in the drafting and conception of the statement, and he endorsed it in an article that ran separately in the Atlanta Journal and the Atlanta Constitution and later appeared in the Congressional Record.

While Rothschild's activism won admiration from some quarters of the city, it earned contempt from others. When 50 sticks of dynamite exploded at the Temple on October 12, 1958, many observers concluded that the rabbi's outspoken support of civil rights had made the synagogue a target of extremist violence. Because the bombing was condemned by elected officials, members of the press, and the vast majority of ordinary citizens, it resulted in a repudiation of extremism and a renewed commitment to racial moderation by members of official Atlanta.

Rather than withdraw from public life, Rothschild stepped up his activism after the bombing, regularly speaking in support of civil rights at public events throughout the city and throughout region, and assuming the vice presidency of the Atlanta Council on Human Relations. Members of his congregation followed Rothschild's lead, taking leadership positions in HOPE (Help Our Public Education) and OASIS (Organizations Assisting Schools in September), two influential organizations that helped ensure the peaceful integration of Atlanta's public schools in 1961.

During this period, Rothschild forged a close personal friendship with Martin Luther King Jr. After King received the Nobel Peace Prize in 1964, Rothschild assisted in the organizing of a city-sponsored banquet in King's honor, and, during the banquet, he served as its master of ceremonies. After King's assassination in 1968, the combined clergy of Atlanta paid their respects to King by holding a memorial service at the Episcopal Cathedral of St. Philip, and Rothschild was selected by his peers to deliver the eulogy.

In the years after King's death, Rothschild's opposition to the more militant measures which were adopted by younger Black activists cost him much of the support that he once received from his African-American counterparts in the civil-rights movement. Despite his diminished stature in the Black community, Rothschild continued to candidly speak about social justice and civil rights on a regular basis until he died, after he suffered a heart attack, on December 31, 1973.

In recent decades, Southern Jews have been more willing to speak out in support of civil rights, as was illustrated by the 1987 marches in Forsyth County, Georgia.

== Educational contributions ==
=== Historical collaboration between African Americans and American Jews ===
In 1917, the Jewish American president of Sears, Roebuck and Co, Julius Rosenwald, formed a partnership with the president of the Tuskegee Institute, Booker T. Washington, leding to the development of the Rosenwald School Project. This initiative funded the construction of more than 5,000 schools for African American children in the segregated South. The schools operated through a grant system; Rosenwald provided the money but he required local Black communities to raise funds and use them to operate and maintain the schools. By the mid- 1930s, approximately one-third of all African American children in the South were educated in Rosenwald Schools. After the Supreme Court ruled that segregation was illegal in Brown v. Board of Education, the schools were either demolished or abandoned. The Rosenwald Fund also provided fellowships to close to one thousand African American researchers, writers, artists, musicians, scientists, lawyers and others to help them with education or to fund research.

=== Intellectual contributions ===
In the 1940s, anthropologist Meville J. Herskovits challenged assumptions about Black American culture in his work, The Myth of the Negro Past. He argued that African Americans retained significant elements of their African cultural heritage despite slavery. His research influenced the development of academic approaches that recognized Africanism and helped shape how African-American history and identity were studied in universities.

== Labor movement ==
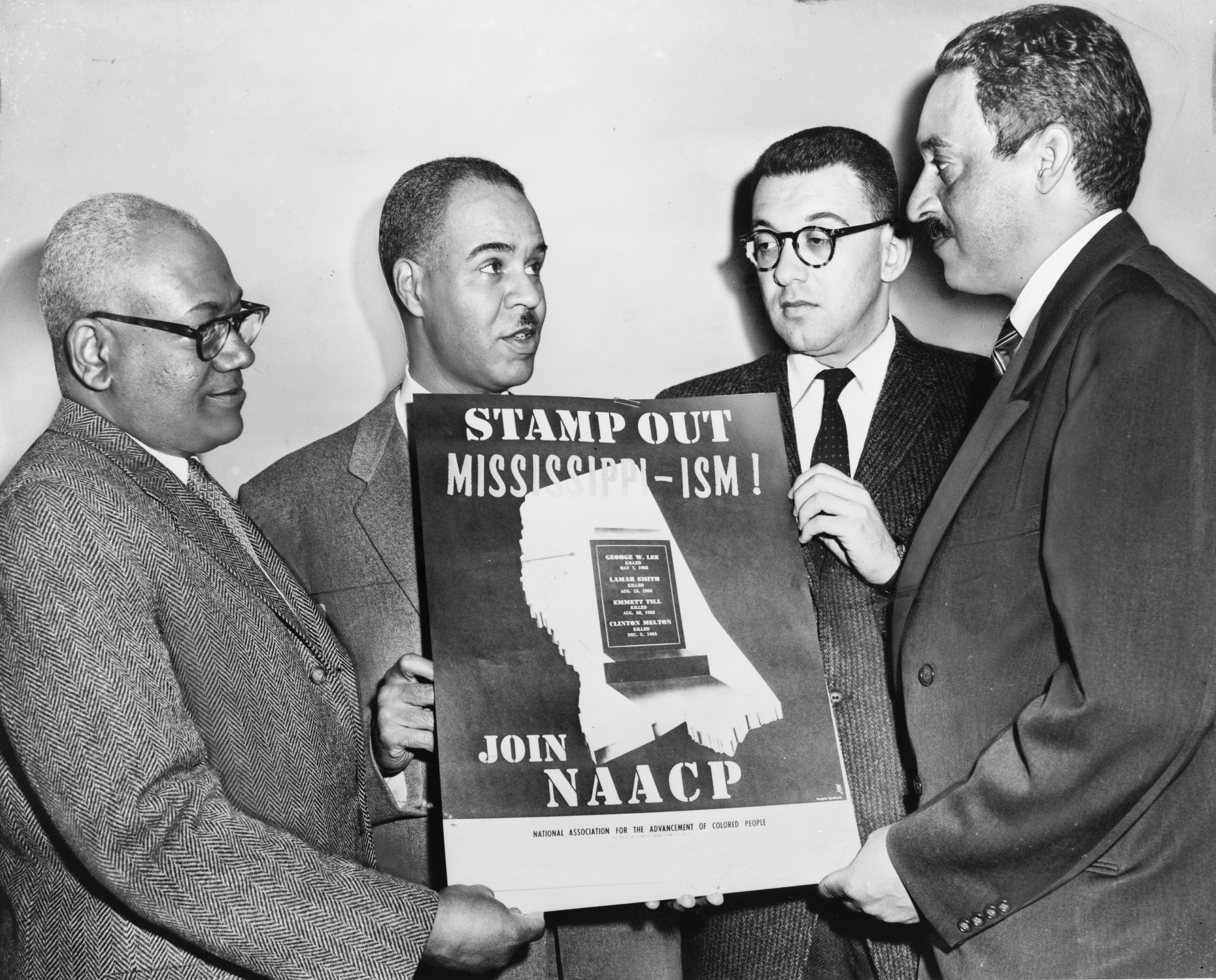
Herbert Hill (second from right), labor director of NAACP, with Thurgood Marshall (second from left)

The labor movement was another area of the African American–Jewish relationship that flourished before WWII, but it ended in conflict afterwards. In the early 20th century, one important area of cooperation was attempts to increase minority representation in the leadership of the United Automobile Workers (UAW). In 1943, Jews and Black people joined to request the creation of a new department within the UAW dedicated to minorities, but that request was refused by UAW leaders.

In the immediate post-World War II period, the Jewish Labor Committee (JLC), which was founded in February 1934 to oppose the rise of Nazism in Germany, formed approximately two dozen local committees to combat racial intolerance in the United States and Canada. The JLC, which had local offices in a number of communities in North America, helped found the United Farm Workers and campaigned for the passage of California's Fair Employment Practices Act, and provided staffing and support for the 1963 March on Washington for Jobs and Freedom led by Martin Luther King Jr., A. Philip Randolph and Bayard Rustin.

Beginning in early 1962, the NAACP's labor director Herbert Hill alleged that, since the 1940s, the JLC had also defended the anti-black discriminatory practices of unions in both the garment and building industries. Hill claimed that the JLC changed "a Black-White conflict into a Black-Jewish conflict". He said that the JLC defended the Jewish leaders of the International Ladies' Garment Workers' Union (ILGWU) against charges of anti-black racial discrimination, distorted the government's reports about discrimination, failed to tell union members the truth, and when union members complained, the JLC labeled them antisemites. Hill stated that ILGWU leaders denounced Black members for demanding equal treatment and access to leadership positions.

The New York City teachers' strike of 1968 also signaled the decline of African American–Jewish relations: The Jewish president of the United Federation of Teachers, Albert Shanker, made statements that were seen by some as straining African American–Jewish relations because in them, he accused Black teachers of being antisemitic.

== Black Hebrew Israelites ==
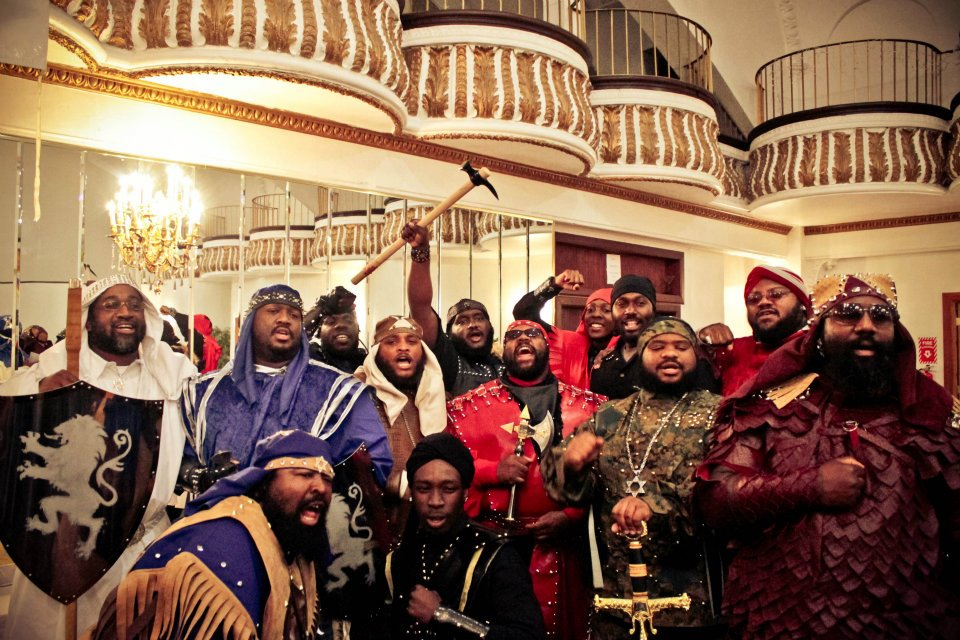
The Hebrew Israelite group ISUPK, Passover, Harlem, 2012

Black Hebrew Israelites are groups of people mostly of Black American ancestry mainly situated in the Americas who claim that they are the descendants of the ancient Israelites. To varying degrees, Black Hebrews adhere to the religious beliefs and practices of both mainstream Judaism and mainstream Christianity, but they get most of their doctrines from Christian resources. They are generally not accepted as Jews by Orthodox, Conservative or Reform Jews, nor are they accepted as Jews by the wider Jewish community, due to their degree of divergence from mainstream Judaism, and their frequent expressions of hostility towards traditionally recognized Jews.

Many Black Hebrews consider themselves the only authentic descendants of the ancient Israelites, claiming that Jews are simply imposters. Some groups identify themselves as Hebrew Israelites, other groups identify themselves as Black Hebrews, and other groups identify themselves as Jews. Dozens of Black Hebrew groups were founded in the United States during the late 19th and early 20th centuries.

In 1969, a group of approximately 100 Black Hebrew Israelites, known as the African Hebrew Israelites, led by Ben Ammi Ben Israel, began to immigrate to Israel, both from Liberia (where they had arrived in 1967) and the United States. They claimed that the Law of Return was applicable to them. Although the first families that arrived claimed that they were Jewish, and/or willing to undergo orthodox conversions to Judaism, upon the arrival of the contingent, including the leadership of it, their willingness to convert to Orthodox Judaism was rescinded. All of the members of the group except the first families had arrived in Israel on tourist visas, which soon expired, and they lived in groups, sometimes in groups of twenty people, in each of the homes which were allocated to the first few families. Many members of the community were given jobs or they succeeded in finding work and as a result, they were largely accepted by the Histadrut, which allocated employment and healthcare rights to them. The mixed response of Israeli officials led to much confusion, and as a result, the community survived in a liminal state. Relations quickly deteriorated during the 1970s and 1980s, with illegal immigration, antisemitic and antizionist propaganda on the one side, and deportations of members and harassment of black visitors by airport security on the other side. Members of the community who lived in America began to promote boycotts of Jewish businesses as a means of exerting pressure. The American Jewish media (like the Israeli media), after an initial feeling of enthusiasm, mostly portrayed the group negatively, however, the American Jewish establishment was usually supportive of the group's wish to remain in Israel. The situation began to be resolved in 1987 when the group's leadership, after meeting with representatives of the American Jewish Congress and Anti-Defamation League, issued a statement retracting all antisemitic and antizionist claims and literature. In 1990, the leadership, Israeli officials and American officials entered into talks that resulted initially in the provision of Temporary Resident status to the community, which had grown to more than 1,000. This status was later upgraded to Permanent Resident, and, in 2003, 1,200 of the group were found to be eligible to apply for Israeli citizenship.

In April 2021, A spokesman for the Israeli government announced Israel's plans to deport dozens of members who had not received official status, including some who had lived their whole lives in Israel. 51 members of the community were ordered to leave their homes by September 23, 2021. In October 2021, the Beersheba court district issued an interim injunction that effectively halted the deportations. In May 2025, the remaining families were granted Temporary Resident status, which has previously been the first step toward citizenship for members.

== Criticism of Zionism and Israel ==
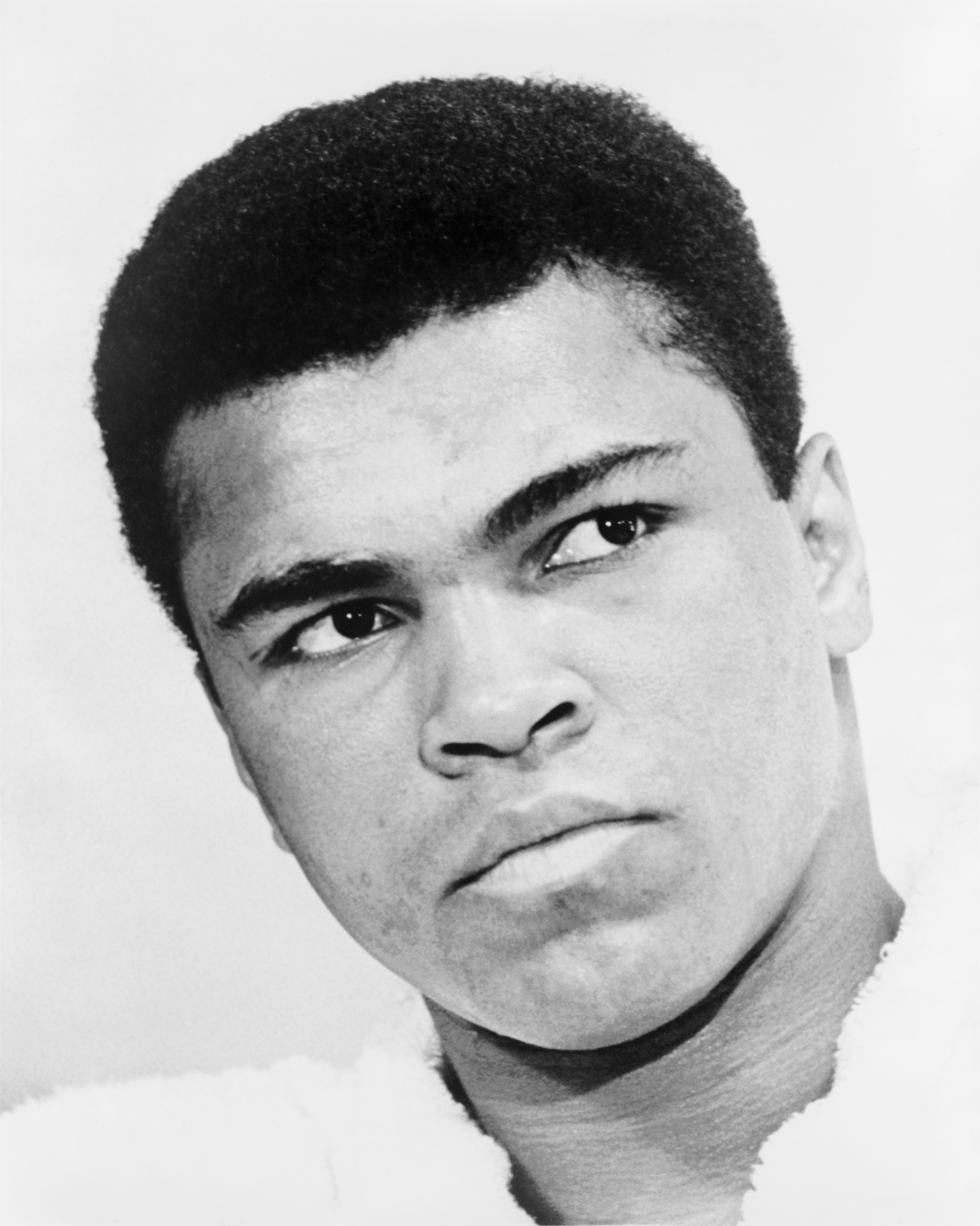
After his retirement, the professional boxer Muhammad Ali publicly opposed Zionism.

After Israel took over the West Bank and Gaza following the 1967 Six-Day War, some Black Americans expressed their solidarity with the Palestinians and criticized Israel's actions; for example, they publicly supported the Palestinian leader Yasser Arafat and called for the destruction of Israel. Some of them, such as Muhammad Ali and Malcolm X, also criticized the Zionist movement.

Immediately after the Six Day War, the editor of the Student Nonviolent Coordinating Committee's (SNCC) newsletter wrote an article that criticized Israel, asserted that the war was an effort to regain Palestinian land and asserted that during the 1948 Arab–Israeli War which triggered the 1948 Palestinian expulsion and flight, "Zionists conquered the Arab homes and land through terror, force, and massacres". The publication of this article triggered a conflict between Jews and the SNCC, but Black SNCC leaders treated the war as a "test of their willingness to demonstrate the SNCC's break from its civil rights past".

Black people continued to express their concerns, leading the Black philosopher Cornel West to write the following in Race Matters in 1993: "Jews will not comprehend what the symbolic predicament and literal plight of Palestinians in Israel means to Blacks.... Blacks often perceive the Jewish defense of the state of Israel as a second instance of naked group interest, and, again, an abandonment of substantive moral deliberation."

Andrew Hacker argues that some African American support for Palestinians is due to the consideration of them as people of color: "The presence of Israel in the Middle East is perceived as thwarting the rightful status of people of color. Some Black people view Israel as essentially a White and European power, supported from the outside, and occupying space that rightfully belongs to the original inhabitants of Palestine."

Martin Luther King Jr. criticized this position at the 68th Annual Rabbinical Assembly for Conservative Judaism, saying:

On the Middle East crisis, we have had various responses. The responses of the so-called young militants does not represent the position of the vast majority of Negroes. There are some who are color consumed and see a kind of mystique in being colored, and anything non-colored is condemned. We do not follow that course in the Southern Christian Leadership Conference, and certainly most of the organizations in the civil rights movement do not follow that course.

Rebecca Pierce and Batya Ungar-Sargon have argued that Jewish criticism of Black political movements and individuals based on their support for Palestinians is based on "a racist hyper-policing of any Black support for Palestine".

== Affirmative action ==
Many Black people have supported government and business affirmative action, believing that meritocracies are subject to institutional racism and unconscious bias. Many Jews, meanwhile, associated affirmative action with quotas that have reduced, rather than increased, Jewish access to jobs and education. Historians believe that this difference in outlook contributed to the decline of the African American–Jewish alliance in the 1970s, when Black people began seeking ways to build on the civil rights legislation of the 1960s.

As Black people continued to face widespread discrimination and struggled to make progress in society, Black activism became increasingly outspoken. Greenberg believes that this increased resentment and fear among Jews. As this activism spread to the North, many liberal Jews also began to move out of areas with increasing Black populations, due to what Greenberg describes as the perceived "deterioration of their schools and neighborhoods", sometimes also citing civil rights protests as a motivator.

Herbert Hill's survey of affirmative-action lawsuits found that Jewish organizations have generally opposed affirmative-action programs. A widely publicized example of the African American–Jewish conflict arose in the 1978 affirmative-action case of Regents of the University of California v. Bakke, when Black and Jewish organizations took opposing sides in the case of a white student who sued for admission, claiming that he was unfairly excluded by affirmative-action programs.

== Antisemitism among African Americans ==
Some leaders of the Black community have publicly made comments or expressed opinions which have been deemed antisemitic. These include accusing Jews of being over-aggressive or exploitative in their business relations with Black people, accusing Jews of being more loyal to Israel than the United States, alleging that Jews had a central role in the slave trade, and accusing Jews of economically oppressing Black people.

Most analysts, including the ADL, attribute Black antisemitism to poor education in disadvantaged communities (in which Black people may be overrepresented due to systemic racism) or to unequal power dynamics and opportunities between Jews and Black people living in close proximity in places like Harlem and the West Side. Other explanations include scapegoating, competition for resources or support, rising identity politics which caused both groups to become more insular, anti-Black racism among Jews, Israeli support for South Africa during apartheid, increasing pro-Palestinian support among Black people and leftists, the failure of white and Jewish liberalism to advance Black rights, resentment over what Judith Rosenbaum called "Jewish feelings of moral proprietorship in the civil rights struggle", or to a perceived failure to show or maintain solidarity with Black communities, particularly in the South. Tema Smith has argued that many of these explanations share systemic racism as a cause.

In 1935, during the Great Depression, the Black activist Sufi Abdul Hamid led boycotts against certain Harlem merchants and establishments which he claimed discriminated against Black people. Many of them were owned by Jewish proprietors, but others were owned by Greeks and Italians. In response to these activities, The Wisconsin Jewish Chronicle accused him of fomenting African American–Jewish "disturbances" in Harlem. He argued that he merely targeted shops that refused to hire Black workers, and he was acquitted of charges of trying to drive out Jewish shopkeepers and of maligning Jews.

Hamid later claimed that Nazi groups had tried to offer him money to organize a "black legion" against the Jews, but that he had refused, since "they had no better feeling for me or my people than for the Jews. either." Hamid renounced antisemitism, saying it was wrong to condemn "Jews as a race" based on the actions of a few who denied jobs to Black people. He founded the Universal Order of Tranquility with the aim of uniting Jews, Christians, White people, and Black people.

In 1984, presidential candidate Jesse Jackson and former United Nations ambassador Andrew Young made antisemitic comments, which were widely publicized. Many have argued that these remarks extended the era of African-American and Jewish distrust into the 1980s.

In 1991, a mob of young Black men killed Yankel Rosenbaum, an Orthodox Jew, in a race riot in Brooklyn, incited by the death of a 7-year-old Black boy in a car accident involving a Jewish driver. The two ethnic groups lived in close proximity to each other in this neighborhood.

During the 1990s, Professor Leonard Jeffries of the City College of New York was a proponent of the idea that Jewish businessmen financed the Atlantic slave trade and used the movie industry to hurt Black people. He was sacked by CUNY and his conclusions have been rejected by major African American historians of the slave trade, including David Brion Davis.

According to a 2016 survey conducted by the Anti-Defamation League, a Jewish organization, the prevalence of antisemitism among African Americans was found to be 23%, compared to 14% for the general population, 19% for U.S.-born Hispanics, 31% for "foreign-born" Hispanics and 10% for white Americans. This prevalence has fallen significantly since surveys in 1998, 1992 and 1964. Conversely, a survey by PRRI in 2018 found that 44% of Black Protestants believe Jewish people face "a lot" of discrimination in America, compared to 31% of religiously unaffiliated Americans, 29% of Catholics, 28% of white mainline Protestants and only 20% of white evangelical Protestants.

=== Nation of Islam ===
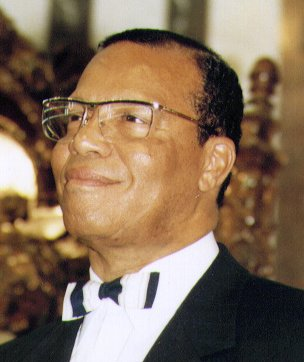
Louis Farrakhan, leader of the Nation of Islam, has made many antisemitic remarks.

The Nation of Islam, a Black separatist religious and political group, made several antisemitic pronouncements in the late 20th century. Founder Elijah Muhammad asserted that white people—as well as Jews—were devils who were implicated in the practice of racism against Black people, but he did not believe that Jews were more corrupt or oppressive than other whites.

In 1993, Nation of Islam spokesman Khalid Abdul Muhammad publicly called Jews "bloodsuckers". Current leader Louis Farrakhan has also made several remarks that the Anti-Defamation League and others consider antisemitic. Although Farrakhan has denied it, a tape obtained by The New York Times supports claims that he referred to Judaism as a "dirty religion" and called Adolf Hitler a "very great man."

Elijah Muhammad claimed that Black people—not white people or Jews—are the chosen people. In a 1985 speech, Farrakhan similarly said, "I have a problem with Jews ... because I am declaring to the world that they are not the chosen people of God. ... You, the black people of America and the Western Hemisphere."

Nation of Islam leader Malcolm X was also widely accused of being antisemitic. His autobiography contains several antisemitic charges and caricatures of Jews. Alex Haley, his co-author, had to make rewrites to eliminate a number of negative statements about Jews in the manuscript. Malcolm X believed the fabricated antisemitic text Protocols of the Elders of Zion was authentic and introduced it to NOI members, while blaming Jews for "perfecting the modern evil" of neo-colonialism. He was a leading figure in shaping Black antisemitism, engaging in Holocaust trivialization and claiming the Jews "brought it on themselves".

In 1961, Malcolm X spoke at an NOI rally alongside George Lincoln Rockwell, head of the American Nazi Party. At a different rally, Rockwell claimed there was overlap between Elijah Muhammed's ideas and white supremacy, although the crowd was hostile towards him and booed at his comments. Even after leaving the NOI and during the last months of his life, Malcolm X's statements about Jews continued to call Jews "bloodsucker[s]".

=== Alleged overrepresentation of Jews in the slave trade ===
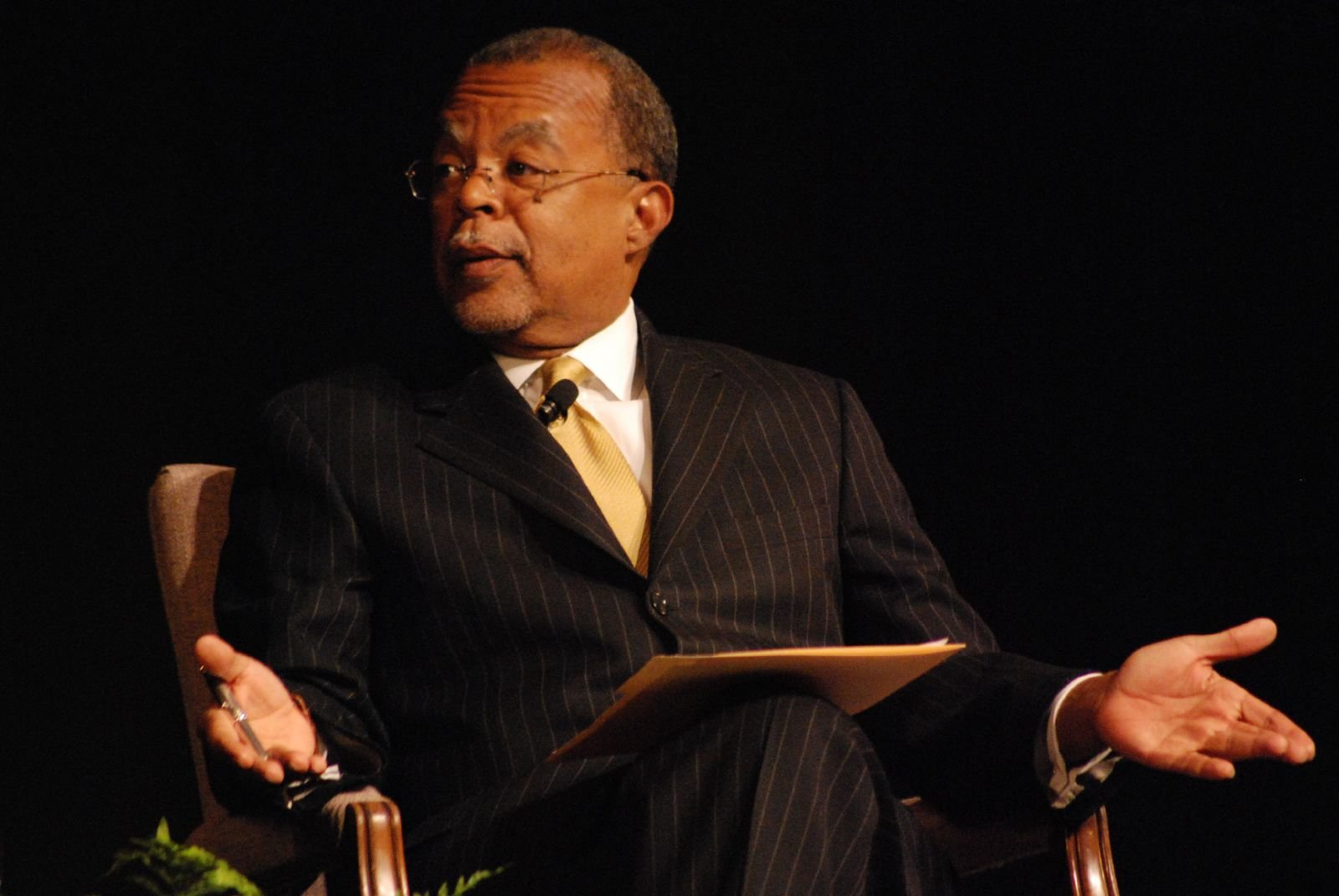
Henry Louis Gates Jr. of Harvard University called The Secret Relationship Between Blacks and Jews "the bible of new anti-Semitism."

The American Jewish population from the 1600s–1800s was extremely low, with few settling in the South. As such, the Jewish role in the American slave trade was minimal. Overall, Jews accounted for 1.25 percent of Southern slave owners. Of all the shipping ports in Colonial America, only in Newport, Rhode Island, did Jewish merchants play a significant part in the slave-trade.

Historian Eli Faber says that "[t]he numbers just aren't there to support the view" of significant numbers of Jewish slaveholders, and that "Jews were involved, but to an insignificant degree."

During the 1990s, much of the conflict between Jews and Black people centered on allegations of antisemitism made against studies of Jewish involvement in the Atlantic slave trade and allegations that they were over-represented as prominent figures in it. Professor Leonard Jeffries stated in a 1991 speech that "rich Jews" financed the slave trade, citing the role of Jews in slave-trading centers such as Rhode Island, Brazil, the Caribbean, Curaçao, and Amsterdam. His comments drew widespread outrage and calls for his dismissal from his position.

As a source, Jeffries cited The Secret Relationship Between Blacks and Jews (1991), published by the Nation of Islam. That book alleges that Jews played a major role in the African slave trade, and it generated considerable controversy. Scholarly works were published which rebutted its charges. Mainstream scholars of slavery such as David Brion Davis concluded that Jews had little major or continuing impact on the history of New World slavery.

Dutch-American historian of the Atlantic world Wim Klooster notes that "[i]n no period did Jews play a leading role as financiers, shipowners, or factors in the transatlantic or Caribbean slave trades. They possessed far fewer slaves than non-Jews in every British territory in North America and the Caribbean. Even when Jews in a handful of places owned slaves in proportions slightly above their representation among a town's families, such cases do not come close to corroborating the assertions of The Secret Relationship."

Tony Martin of Wellesley College included The Secret Relationship between Blacks and Jews in the reading list for his classes, leading to charges of antisemitism against him in 1993.

Henry Louis Gates Jr. of Harvard University called the book "the bible of new anti-Semitism" and added that "the book massively misinterprets the historical record, largely through a process of cunningly selective quotations of often reputable sources."

== Anti-Black racism among Jews ==
The counterpoint to Black antisemitism is Jewish anti-Black racism. Criticisms of Black activists by Jewish authors often portrayed them as "extremists" or "militants," and sometimes blamed Black people for their own oppression. The civil rights movement was sometimes seen as violent or dangerous, and affirmative action was seen as a threat to the quality of schools. Rebecca Pierce and Batya Ungar-Sargon have also argued that "a racist hyper-policing of any Black support for Palestine" has often led American Jews to denounce Black political movements and figures, including Angela Davis, the Movement for Black Lives and anti-police brutality events.

A number of Jewish and Black commentators have also highlighted racism against Black Jews and Jews of color from within their own communities, which has sometimes resulted in "pushing black Jews out". Rebecca Pierce has criticized the policing of Jewish identities among Jews of color, or accusations of "Jewface", which she argues are based on a conspiracy theory and constitute part of an "undeniable pattern of racist harassment and abuse" levied against Jews of color.

According to the 2022 PRRI-EPU Religion and Inclusive Spaces Survey, American Jews score 0.39 on the Structural Racism Index, scoring slightly lower (i.e., less racist) than the average American (0.45) on issues regarding structural and anti-black racism. Black Americans score 0.20, Hispanic Americans score 0.33 and white Americans score 0.52.

=== Robert Moses ===
Robert Moses was a Jewish American urban planner and public official who worked in the New York metropolitan area during the early to mid-20th century. Moses denied being Jewish, and he converted to Episcopalian Christianity. Moses built highways splitting many Jewish neighborhoods in the Bronx and Brooklyn, devastating those Jewish communities. He also threatened to sue the editors of the Jewish encyclopedia for libel if they included him in it. At the 1964 World's Fair in New York, he had an exhibit on every religion but Judaism.

In his Pulitzer-winning biography The Power Broker, Robert Caro accused Moses of building low bridges across his parkways in order to make them inaccessible to public-transit buses, thereby restricting "the use of state parks by poor and lower-middle-class families" that did not own cars. Caro argues that Moses attempted to discourage Black people from visiting Jones Beach, the centerpiece of the Long Island state park system, by such measures as making it difficult for Black groups to get permits to park buses, even if they came by other roads, and assigning Black lifeguards to "distant, less developed beaches" instead. While the exclusion of commercial vehicles and the use of low bridges were standard on earlier parkways for aesthetic reasons, Caro argues that Moses made greater use of such bridges, which his aide Sidney Shapiro said was done to make it more difficult for future legislators to allow commercial vehicles. Steve Woolgar and Geoff Cooper refer to the claim about bridges as an "urban legend".

In response to the biography, Moses defended the displacement of poor and minority communities as an inevitable part of urban revitalization: "I raise my stein to the builder who can remove ghettos without moving people as I hail the chef who can make omelets without breaking eggs."

There were allegations Moses selectively chose locations for recreational facilities based on the racial compositions of neighborhood, such as when he selected sites for 11 pools that opened in 1936. According to Jeff Wiltze, Moses purposely placed some pools in neighborhoods with mainly white populations to deter African Americans from using them, and other pools intended for African Americans, such as the one in Colonial Park (now Jackie Robinson Park), were placed in inconvenient locations. Steven A. Reiss notes that, of 255 playgrounds built in the 1930s under Moses's tenure, only two were in largely Black neighborhoods. Caro wrote that close associates of Moses had claimed they could keep African Americans from using the Thomas Jefferson Pool, in then predominantly white East Harlem, by making the water too cold. However, no other source has corroborated the claim that heaters in any particular pool were deactivated or excluded from the pool's design.

On March 26, 1952, Moses gave a speech at an event in New York City which commemorated Lady Randolph Churchill, the mother of Sir Winston Churchill. In the speech, Moses claimed that Rudyard Kipling foresaw "the rise of lesser breeds without the law", a comment described as "excruciatingly racist" by the journalist Glen Jeffries.

=== William Levitt ===
William Jaird Levitt was a Jewish American real-estate developer and housing pioneer. As president of Levitt & Sons, he is widely credited as the father of modern American suburbia. In 1998, he was named one of Time Magazine's "100 Most Influential People of the 20th Century."

While Levitt is credited as being the "father of suburban development", African Americans were explicitly prohibited from purchasing or otherwise settling in his Levittown, New York development, setting the stage for other suburban towns nationwide. Levitt wrote [in the Levittown standard lease, clause 25, 1947], "Levittown homes must not be used or occupied by any person other than members of the Caucasian race."

=== Southern states ===
Before the Civil War, Jewish slave ownership practices in the Southern United States were governed by regional practices, rather than Judaic law. Many Southern Jews held the view that Black people were subhumans fit only for slavery, which was also the predominant view held by many of their non-Jewish Southern Christian neighbors.

Jews were not significantly different from other Southern slave owners in their treatment of slaves. Wealthy Jewish families in the American South generally preferred employing white servants rather than owning slaves. Jewish slave owners included Aaron Lopez, Francis Salvador, Judah Touro, and Haym Salomon. Jewish slave owners were mostly found in business or domestic settings, rather than plantations, so most of the slave ownership was in an urban context — running a business or working as domestic servants. Jewish slave owners freed their Black slaves at about the same rate as non-Jewish slave owners. Sometimes, Jewish slave owners bequeathed slaves to their children in their wills.

After the Civil War, Southern Jews often bemoaned the abolition of slavery. For instance, Solomon Cohen, a Confederate Jewish leader in Savannah, Georgia and Georgia's first Jewish senator, described slavery as "the only institution that could elevate the Negro from barbarism and develop the small amount of intellect with which he is endowed."

While anti-black racism animated the original Ku Klux Klan, antisemitism did not. Many prominent Southern Jews identified wholly with southern culture, leading some to participate in the Klan. In 1896, an editorial in the newspaper The Jewish South observed that "Twenty-five years of education resulted in making the colored women more immoral and the men more trifling... Negroes are intellectually, morally and physically an inferior race — a fact none can deny."

Ten years later, the board of Atlanta, Georgia's Carnegie Library rejected a petition to admit Black people; a Jewish board member voted with the majority. These were not isolated incidents. In 1903, Leon Pinsker argued, in Auto-Emancipation, that Jewish suffering was worse than Black suffering, because "unlike the negroes, they [Jews] belong to an advanced race".

=== Northern states ===
Gil Ribak argues that when Jewish immigrants began arriving in large numbers from Eastern Europe, they brought with them prejudices about Gentile peasants, which they transferred to African Americans. He points to late-19th century portrayals of Gentiles in Yiddish folklore as "that of a peasant, portrayed as inherently Jew-hating, strong, coarse, drunk, illiterate, dumb, and sexually promiscuous," and the work of scholars such as Israel Bartal, Ewa Morawska, and David Roskies who have illustrated that "Jews differentiated between what they saw as high-cultured and low-cultured Gentiles". Because of the role of many Jewish immigrants as "storeowners, tavern keepers, peddlers, and landlords" to Black people, this reinforced those attitudes and "African Americans were frequently seen as the new country's reincarnation of peasant folk" or the poyerim/muzhikes.

Ribak has also noted how newly arrived Jews in America, as opposed to those who were born there, often considered Black people in exoticized or racialized ways. Sholem Aleichem (Sholem Yankev Rabinovitsh) would describe Black people on the train as "Crude creatures. Frightfully thick lips. Big white teeth and white finger-nails." Even those sympathetic to Black people still expressed anti-black sentiments. Arriving in 1914, Hebrew-language educator and entrepreneur Zvi Scharfstein noted:

It was the first time we saw black people. Beforehand we saw them only in books and newspapers’ illustrations. Now they actually passed by us, showing their white teeth and pouting their thick lips, whose strong redness lit their faces’ blackness. With each encounter or brushing elbows against them — my heart quivered.

After 40 years of having Black men and women as servants in his house, Scharfstein later admitted, "I cannot remove completely the traces of that hidden fear from my heart." Despite penning a moving story, "Lynching", about the horrors of anti-black racism, Yiddish playwright Yoysef Opatoshu described an old Black man in the story as "an old Orangutan."

In Harlem, the West Side and other Black neighborhoods, Black customers and tenants felt that Jewish shopkeepers and landlords treated them unfairly because they were racists. Hacker quotes James Baldwin's comments about Jewish shopkeepers in Harlem in support of his racism claim. Rabbi Max Raisin believed that Jews and whites fled Harlem because of the number of Black people moving there. The notorious Bronx "slave markets", predominantly based in Jewish neighborhoods, often saw Black women exploited to work as domestic help. Many were hired by Jewish households and were often extremely underpaid, further straining African American–Jewish relationships.

In 1904, a Board of Education plan to move Jewish children from overcrowded schools on the East Side to the West Side drew condemnation from 2,000 Jewish parents. The newspaper Yidishe Velt (Jewish World) pointed out that this move would put Jewish children into "a Negro neighborhood, not far from the Tenderloin [district]" with "Negroes and painted-up hussies." The President of the Zionist Council of Greater New York, Abraham H. Fromenson, who served as co-editor of the Yidishes Tageblat (Jewish Daily News), wrote that children would be moved to "a street infested with the dirtiest rabble, the scum of the colored race." Fromenson would later defend Booker T. Washington from a racist attack in a Jewish weekly newspaper from St. Louis, The Modern View, though he said in the same defense, "if [the black man] manifests evil inclinations we should not wonder at it, seeing the many years of slavery his race has gone through."

An example of Jewish ambivalence to Black people, Rabbi Max (Mordecai Ze’ev) Raisin expressed his concern about the plight of African Americans, saying, "I bow before blacks in respect," but also, "I thank God that we Jews have at least white skin and are able to intermingle among whites" (a thought which immediately brought him "burning shame"). He would also say, "Negroes must not be likened to Jews. They never wrote a bible, did not give prophets and messiahs to the world," and that "only white trash will agree to marry blacks."

In the early 1970s, Atlanta's first Jewish mayor, Sam Massell, used overt anti-black rhetoric in his re-election bid for mayor against the city's first Black mayoral candidate, Maynard Jackson. As a result, many progressive and college-educated whites in the city (including Atlanta's largest daily newspaper) publicly endorsed Jackson, which caused Massell to lose his re-election campaign.

In his 1992 essay "Blacks and Jews: The Uncivil War," historian Taylor Branch asserted that Jews had been "perpetrators of racial hate." He noted that 3,000 members of the African Hebrew Israelites of Jerusalem, founded in 1966 in Chicago, were denied citizenship as Jews when they moved en masse to Israel. The Americans claimed that they had the right of citizenship as Jews under the Israeli Law of Return. Under the law, the only people who are recognized as Jews are people who are born Jews (having a Jewish mother or having a Jewish maternal grandmother), those with Jewish ancestry (having a Jewish father or having a Jewish grandfather), and people who convert to Orthodox, Reform, or Conservative Judaism. (Note: The law also provides certain rights to the spouse of a person who is recognized as a Jew, the children and grandchildren of a person who is recognized as a Jew, and the spouses of the children and grandchildren of a person who is recognized as a Jew.)

Branch believed that the rejection of the Chicago group was based on anti-Black sentiment among Israeli Jews. Branch was criticized by Seth Forman, who said that his claims seemed baseless. He said that Israel had airlifted thousands of Ethiopian Jews to Israel in the early 1990s. A group of American civil rights activists which was led by Bayard Rustin investigated the 1966 case. They concluded that racism was not the cause of the Black Hebrews' rejection in Israel; they were considered a cult rather than a group of historic Jewish descendants.

=== Ocean Hill–Brownsville crisis ===
Albert Shanker, who was president of the United Federation of Teachers from 1964 to 1985 and president of the American Federation of Teachers (AFT) from 1974 to 1997, has been accused of anti-black racism. Early on, he marched with Martin Luther King Jr., but later moved to the right and proudly supported the Vietnam War.

In the 1968 Ocean Hill–Brownsville crisis, Black and Puerto Rican parents in Brooklyn were piloting a community school program (known as community control) intended to fight segregation and racial inequity in education, including improving attainment for students of color. The school board was also concerned about the lack of role models for the mostly Black and Puerto Rican students.

When the school board fired 19 white union teachers for underperforming, Shanker led UFT teachers in a strike. He also shared antisemitic leaflets that he said were put in teachers' lockers, which the school board argued was a deliberate attempt to fan the flames; they pointed out that half the new teachers they had hired to cover the strike were Jewish. Shanker also personally cut chapters on Malcolm X and a quote from Frederick Douglass ("power concedes nothing without a demand") from the proposed course Lesson Plans on African-American History, which he deemed too "radical".

Shanker would eventually propose charter schools in the United States, which, according to The New York Times, became "even more racially and economically segregated than traditional public schools." Charter schools deepened the issues against which Black and Puerto Rican parents had fought and helped widen the rift between Black people and Jews nationally.

== See also ==
- African Americans in Israel
- African-American Jews
  - Black Hebrew Israelites – groups of African Americans who believe that they are the descendants of the ancient Israelites
    - Black Judaism
- African-American Muslims
- American Jews
  - History of the Jews in the United States
- Antisemitism in the United States
  - History of antisemitism in the United States
- Interminority racism in the United States
- Jewish anti-racism
- Jews in the civil rights movement
- Jews of color
- Racism in Jewish communities
  - Racism in Israel
