= Jews and the American Slave Trade (book) =

1998 history book by Saul S. Friedman

- Author: Saul S. Friedman
- Language: English
- Publisher: Transaction Publishers
- Publication date: 1998
- Publication place: United States
- Media type: Print (hardback & paperback)
- Pages: xiv + 326 pp
- ISBN: 1-56000-337-5

Jews and the American Slave Trade is a 1998 book by American historian Saul S. Friedman published by the Transaction Publishers. It focuses on the Jewish involvement in the American slave trade and is a polemical rebuttal against the 1991 work The Secret Relationship Between Blacks and Jews. It has also been described as contributing to the contemporary debates related to African American–Jewish relations.

== Structure ==
The book is composed of 17 chapters. In the first six, Friedman describes the history of slavery worldwide. In later chapters, he focuses on slavery in the United States.

== Reviews and reception ==
Kenneth Maxwell in a "capsule review" for the Foreign Affairs called the book a "thorough and scholarly account" and "a detailed and utterly convincing refutation" of the claims presented in The Secret Relationship between Blacks and Jews (a 1991 work by the Nation of Islam) which claimed that Jews dominated the African slave trade.

Leonard Dinnerstein, in his review of the book for The American Historical Review (1999) also noted that the book is, to a significant degree, a point by point rebuttal of the 1981 edition which the author describes as "one part fact and nine parts fable". Friedman notes that while there were Jewish slave traders and slave owners, they were a minority, and even argues that on average, they treated their slaves better than others.

Joseph C. Miller also reviewed the book that year in The Journal of American History. Likewise, he agrees that Friedman work successfully debunks the 1981 book by the Nation of Islam, which he referred to as a book of "malicious allegations", and notes that Friedman himself described that work as a "Handbook of Hate" (the title of his first chapter). Miler notes that Friedman's assessment of Jews among those associated with slavery constituted only a "tiny presence". Miller also notes that according to Friedman, his work is a polemic, which can be seen as an example of antisemitism found in the Afrocentrism movement. Overall, Miller concludes that Friedman's book is a worthy effort but is unlikely to have a significant impact due to its focus on academic audiences rather than the general public. He also notes that the book topic is relevant to the issues discussed in contemporary American politics.

In 2000 the book was reviewed by Patrick Manning in Shofar: An Interdisciplinary Journal of Jewish Studies. He concurs with the previous reviewers, noting that Friedman "has succeeded..., in refuting the strongest forms of the assertions of Jewish dominance of the institutions of slavery". He also notes that the book is a valuable contribution to the American public debates "between blacks and Jews".

In 2001 the book was reviewed by Daniel C. Littlefield for American Jewish History, who also noted that the topic has major relevance to the area of African American-Jewish relations. Littlefield argues that the last two chapters of the book, focusing on this topic, are the most interesting. On the book's main subject, he observes that "without claiming that Jews were nowhere ever involved in slavery or the slave trade, [the author] fairly effectively demonstrates that they dominated neither".

== See also ==
- Jews, Slaves and the Slave Trade: Setting the Record Straight
