= Jews, Slaves and the Slave Trade =

1998 book by Eli Faber

Jews, Slaves and the Slave Trade: Setting the Record Straight
- Author: Eli Faber
- Language: English
- Publisher: New York University Press
- Publication date: 1998
- Publication place: United States
- Media type: Print (hardback & paperback)
- Pages: 366 pp
- ISBN: 0814726380
- OCLC: 38765030

Jews, Slaves and the Slave Trade: Setting the Record Straight is a 1998 book by Eli Faber. It focuses on Jewish involvement in the American slave trade, and was a polemical rebuttal against the Nation of Islam's 1991 book The Secret Relationship Between Blacks and Jews.

== Structure ==
About half of the book is composed of appendices.

== Reviews and reception ==
In 1999, Joseph C. Miller reviewed the book in The Journal of American History. He noted that it is one of several works intended as a polemical rebuttal of claims presented in The Secret Relationship Between Blacks and Jews (a 1991 book by the Nation of Islam) which claimed that Jews dominated the African slave trade. He notes that the book analyzes the Jewish participation in the slave trade in a quantitative manner, beginning with the 17th century. He concludes that Faber shows that the Jews were engaged in the slave trade no more and no less than merchants of other backgrounds.

Several more reviews appeared in 2000. David Eltis reviewed the book for The American Historical Review. He noted that the book contributes little to the scholarship in the area of history of slavery, but may be of more interest to those interested in the topic of Jewish history, and that the book is overall disappointing in not answering the question of "why a belief in the Jewish dominance of the slave trade or slave system has suddenly re-emerged in the 1990s".

That year, Sharon Halevi reviewed the book for the journal Jewish History. She notes that Faber book is the "first sustained attempt" to address the claims made in The Secret Relationship. She notes that Faber found that in the early colonial period, Jews had actually "far fewer slaves than their non-Jewish neighbors", likely because most Jews were involved in commerce and not agriculture, which was the common source of large slave communities. Helevi concludes that the work will likely "serve as the baseline for any future study on the topic", although it would be strengthened if the author addressed in more details the question of "why did Jews stay away from the slave trade".

Also that year, reviewing the book for the Journal of Social History, Herbert S. Klein wrote that the book should be seen in the context of the contemporary debates related to the African American–Jewish relations. While noting the book’s limitation of focussing primarily on English sources, he concludes that the book is "a significant contribution to the economic and commercial history of colonial English America".

Another review from that year was Wim Klooster's for The William and Mary Quarterly. He notes that the book is a good rebuke for the earlier claims, as "in no period did Jews play a leading role as financiers, shipowners, or factors in the transatlantic of Caribbean slave trades" and "they possessed far fewer slaves than non-Jews" in the New World. He notes that it would be interesting to similar analysis done outside the English colonies, through those might also be more challenging.

Also in 2000, Vernon J. Williams Jr. reviewed the book for the Shofar: An Interdisciplinary Journal of Jewish Studies. Observing that it is a polemic to The Secret Relationship, Williams describes the book as a "taxing read" due to it being "loaded with quantitative data", through he concludes that "Faber has delivered a powerful body blow to those who claim erroneously that persons of Jewish faith dominated the British slave trade".

In 2002, Harold Brackman reviewed the book for the AJS Review. He notes that Faber's book is "the latest, least polemical, and arguably most important contribution" to the growing literature on Jews and the slave trade, reinforcing the academic consensus "that the Jewish role in the trade was minimal", accounting to maybe several percent of the American slave trade, and likely less than one percent of the slave ownership. Like Helevi, however he notes that the book does contain unaddressed questions, primarily regarding the motivations of Jews in not engaging in the slave trade more.

Also that year, Paul Finkelman reviewed the book for the Journal of Law and Religion. Commenting on the claims by The Secret Relationship about Jewish participation in the slave trade, which he calls ludicrous, he notes that Faber indeed succeeds in "setting the record straight", as indicated by the book's very subtitle, although he notes that the book may not reach the audiences which need to hear its message the most. He notes that Faber demonstrates that Jewish merchants in the New World were less likely to be involved in slave trade than their Christian counterparts, and that overall, Jews were "virtually irrelevant to the history of slavery and the slave trade in the New World". He does, however, criticize the book for not covering in depth the case of Suriname, which he argues is a likely exception to the pattern of Jews not being involved in agriculture and therefore not owning many slaves. Like previous reviewers, he also notes that the book focuses too much on the presentation of statistics, and does too little to analyze them, in particular, not addressing the issue of whether there is a connection between Jewish culture and their relatively small involvement in the various aspects of slavery.

== See also ==
- Jews and the American Slave Trade
- The Secret Relationship Between Blacks and Jews
