= Wisconsin Jewish Chronicle =

Jewish newspaper

- Type: Monthly newspaper
- Owner: Milwaukee Jewish Federation
- Editor: Rob Golub
- Language: English
- City: Milwaukee, Wisconsin
- Country: United States
- Circulation: 8,700
- Website: www.jewishchronicle.org

The Wisconsin Jewish Chronicle is a monthly Jewish newspaper, published in Milwaukee, Wisconsin. It was established in 1921 by a pair of German Jews, Nathan J. Gould and Irving G. Rhodes. The editor is Rob Golub.

Golub won two 2016 Milwaukee Press Club awards for Excellence in Journalism, for an editorial and a critical review in the Chronicle.

A former editor was Andrew Muchin who resigned after running an editorial calling for the resignation of then-Israeli Prime Minister Binyamin Netanyahu.
