= Saul S. Friedman =

American historian (1937–2013)

Saul S. Friedman (March 8, 1937 in Uniontown, Pennsylvania – March 31, 2013 in Canfield, Ohio) was an American historian.

== Life ==
Saul S. Friedman, son of Albert and Rebecca Friedman, came from a large Jewish family. He married Nancy Evans in 1964, they had three children, Dr. Molly Friedman, Jason Friedman, as well as the historian Jonathan C. Friedman.

Friedman graduated from Kent State University (BA) and received his PhD in history from Ohio State University. He was appointed Professor of Jewish and Middle East History at Youngstown State University in 1969. In 2000 he founded the YSU Judaic and Holocaust Studies program. In 2006 he retired.

Friedman was a researcher on anti-Semitism. He published a series of books on the Holocaust and the history of the Middle East. In addition to twelve books, he produced documentaries from the late 1980s, five of which were awarded regional Emmy Awards.

== Books ==
Friedman authored twelve books.

=== Holocaust ===
- No Haven for the Oppressed (1973).
- Pogromchik (1976).
- Amcha (1979).
- The Oberammergau Passion Play (Southern Illinois University Press, 1984).
- The Terezin Diary of Gonda Redlich (1992).
- Holocaust Literature (1993).
- A History of the Holocaust (2004).

=== Middle East ===
- Land of Dust (1982).
- Without Future (1989).
- A History of the Middle East (2006).

=== Jews in America ===
- The Incident at Massena (1978).
- Jews and the American Slave Trade (1998).
