= Seymour Drescher =

American historian (born 1934)

- Born: 1934 (age 91–92)
- Occupations: Professor and Historian
- Employer: University of Pittsburgh

Seymour Drescher (born 1934) is an American historian and a professor at the University of Pittsburgh, known for his studies on Alexis de Tocqueville and slavery and his published work Econocide.

== Career ==
Seymour Drescher has been publishing since 1959. He initially focused his research on Tocqueville. He was the first to attract scholarly attention to Tocqueville's views of problems of poverty, colonial slavery, and race. Of his work in this field, Tocqueville scholar Matthew Mancini, calls Seymour Drescher "arguably the finest Tocqueville scholar writing in English...".

Drescher's more recent historical studies have been primarily in the history of slavery and abolition in the Atlantic world. His book Econocide made a convincing counter-claim to Eric Williams' argument that abolition happened in part due to the economic decline of the British West Indies (BWI) after 1775. Drescher instead states that the slavery-based system which underpinned the economy of the BWI continued to be profitable prior to 1815 and that abolition actually caused the decline rather than the other way around. There has been much debate among historians regarding this topic.

== Awards ==
- 2003 – Frederick Douglass Prize

== Selected works ==
- Econocide: British Slavery in the Era of Abolition, Pittsburgh, University of Pittsburgh Press, 1977
- Capitalism and Antislavery: British Mobilization in Comparative Perspective, New York, Oxford University Press, 1987
- From Slavery to Freedom: Comparative Studies in the Rise and the Fall of Atlantic Slavery, New York, New York University Press, 1999
- The Mighty Experiment: Free Labor versus Slavery in British Emancipation, Cambridge, Cambridge University Press, 2002
- Abolition: A History of Slavery and Antislavery, New York, Cambridge University Press, 2009 ISBN 978-0-521-60085-9 and ISBN 978-0-521-84102-3

== Life ==
Seymour Drescher was born in 1934 in the Bronx, New York to Polish Jewish parents. Drescher moved to Pittsburgh in 1962 with his wife, Ruth Drescher. In 2018, he narrowly avoided being a victim on the mass shooting on the Tree of Life Congregation.
