= Eli Faber =

American historian (1943–2020)

- Born: Eli S. Faber; July 30, 1943
- Died: April 2020 (aged 76); West Babylon, New York, U.S.

Eli S. Faber (July 30, 1943 – April 2020) was a professor of history at John Jay College of Criminal Justice. He was the editor of the American Jewish History journal.

He studied American history at Columbia University, from which he received a Ph.D. He originally found out about the George Stinney case, in which a 14-year-old African-American boy was sentenced to death via electric chair after being accused of murdering two girls, in an academic conference in 2003. His final book, which recounted the story of this case, was published posthumously, in June 2021.

He was married to Lani Faber and died of pancreatic cancer in April 2020, which had been diagnosed in March 2019.

== Works ==
- A Time for Planting: The First Migration, 1654–1820. Johns Hopkins University Press, 1992.
- Jews, Slaves and the Slave Trade: Setting the Record Straight. New York University Press, 1998.
- The Child in the Electric Chair: The Execution of George Junius Stinney Jr. and the Making of a Tragedy in the American South. University of South Carolina Press, 2021.
