= Heifetz =

Heifetz is a Jewish surname from Belarus and Lithuania. It derives from Hebrew חפץ (chefets; "delight" "pleasure"). It is unrelated to the similar-sounding Arabic name حافظ (Hafez or Hafiz; guardian, protector). It is also spelled Chafets, Chaffetz, Chaifetz, Cheifetz, Chejfec, Chofets. It may refer to:

- Ze'ev Chafets, American-Israeli author and columnist
- Jason Chaffetz (born 1967), a U.S. Representative from Utah
- Hammond Chaffetz (1907–2001), a U.S. federal prosecutor and partner at Kirkland & Ellis
- Jill Chaifetz (1964–2006), an American lawyer and children's rights advocate
- Sergio Chejfec (1956–2022), an American-Argentine writer.
- Jonathon Hafetz, American lawyer and writer
- Daniel Heifetz (born 1948), concert violinist and founder of the Heifetz International Music Institute (brother of Ronald L. Heifetz)
- Danny Heifetz, American musician, percussionist, grandson of Jascha Heifetz
- Jascha Heifetz (1901–1987), Lithuanian-born American violinist
- Ronald L. Heifetz, American leadership teacher
- Yuri Heifetz, Russian poet and singer-songwriter
- Grigory Kheifets, Soviet intelligence agent
- Iosif Kheifits, Soviet film director
- Chofetz Chaim, (1838–1933), popular name of Rabbi Yisrael Meir ha-Kohen Kagan, Lithuanian rabbi and posek
