= Chaffetz =

Chaffetz is a variation of the surname Heifetz. Notable people with the surname include:

- Jason Chaffetz (born 1967), American politician
- Hammond Chaffetz (1907–2001), federal prosecutor and partner at Kirkland & Ellis

== See also ==
- Chaifetz
