= Morris Cafritz =

Real estate developer, and philanthropist

- Born: 1888; Lithuania
- Died: June 13, 1964, 77 years old Hot Springs, Virginia
- Known for: Real estate development and Philanthropy in Washington, D.C.
- Spouse: Gwendolyn Detre de Surany
- Children: Calvin Cafritz; Carter Cafritz; Conrad Cafritz
- Relatives: Julia Cafritz (granddaughter); Peggy Cooper Cafritz (daughter-in-law); Hammond Chaffetz (second cousin)

Morris Cafritz (c. 1888 - June 13, 1964) was a Washington, D.C. real estate developer, and philanthropist. As CEO of the Cafritz Company, he was Washington, D.C.'s largest private developer from the late 1920's to the early 1960's.

== Early life and education ==
Cafritz was born to Jewish parents, Nathan and Anna Cafritz, in the Russian Empire (Lithuania). Based on papers filed in court, Cafritz was born in 1888; however, the year of his birth is not known and Cafritz had often understated his age. Along with his 4 siblings—Sarah, Carrie, Edwin and William—he was brought to the United States by his parents in 1894. After briefly settling in New York, the family moved to Washington and operated a small grocery store on 24th and P Streets NW. Cafritz scouted the Maine Avenue Fish Market for fish for the store and sold newspapers on 15th Street, near the United States Department of the Treasury. At the age of 19, he studied at the National University School of Law before realizing that he wanted to be in business, not law. Cafritz began his business career in 1904 by buying the Star Coal and Coke Company, at 315 Q Street, with a $1,400 loan from his father. In 1911, he owned a saloon, the Old-Timer's Bar, at 8th Street and K Street, Southeast, Washington, D.C. He also acquired bowling alleys and by 1915, he was known as Washington's "bowling king".

== Real estate development career ==
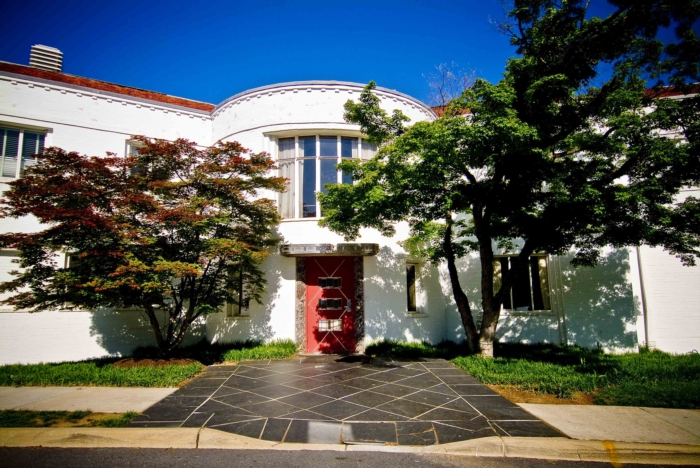
Cafritz house, now The Field School

In 1916, he began developing two-story row-houses. In 1922, he founded Cafritz Construction and acquired a large tract of land for $700,000, which he financed with a down payment of $35,000; he eventually built 3,000 houses on the site. The first phase included 53 rowhouses in Petworth, which he sold for $8,950 each.

He developed the Greenwich Forest neighborhood in Bethesda, Maryland. He built the now-demolished Ambassador Hotel, at 14th and K Street. In 1932, he led the group that constructed the Westchester Apartments, at which Barry Goldwater resided. The same year, Cafritz built homes in the neighborhood next to the National Arboretum. Cafritz built the Majestic Apartments. In 1938, he built his residence, a mansion at 2301 Foxhall Road, N.W. In 1949, he built the Cafritz Building, at 1625 Eye Street. He developed several office buildings along K Street, including 1725 K, 1725 I, and 1735 I Streets.

Pentagon City was founded in 1946, when developers Morris Cafritz and Charles H. Tompkins acquired a 190-acre site of empty fields and commercial warehouses for $1.5 million.[2][3] On the Pentagon City Site Morris Cafritz developed the massive 1,600 unit River House Apartments. In the early 1960's Morris Cafritz received approval to bring the Washington, DC, Metro to the Pentagon City. The Pentagon City Metro stop was completed in the 1980's. In 2006 the remaining land at Pentagon City, including the River House Apartments, were sold to the New York City developer Vornado. At the same time the Cafritz warehouses were sold to the developer Kettler Brothers. Part of these properties are now the location for Amazon's new Washington, D.C. headquarters building.

== Death ==
Cafritz died in 1964 of a heart attack. When he died, his estate was the largest ever probated in the District of Columbia. It took lawyers and IRS agents 4 years to settle the estate, which was valued in 1968 at $66 million. He is buried in the Washington Hebrew Congregation Cemetery, Washington, D.C.

== Philanthropy ==
He raised $250,000 to build the Washington, D.C. Jewish Community Center, of which he was a charter member and president.

In 1964, he offered to donate the Chase's Theater and Riggs Building as a performing arts center.

The Morris Cafritz Center for the Arts at the DC Jewish Community Center is named for him.

=== Morris and Gwendolyn Cafritz Foundation ===
Cafritz founded the Morris and Gwendolyn Cafritz Foundation in 1948, funding it with $11.5 million. Today the foundation is the largest private foundation focused on Washington, D.C., with assets of over $780,000,000. The Cafritz Foundation is one of the top 100 Private Family Foundations in the U.S. It gives annual charitable grants of $20 million to nonprofit organizations in the Washington, D.C. area. It has given over $500 million since inception. The foundation awards the Distinguished DC Government Employees Award to individuals who exemplify the best in public service.

== Family ==
In July 1929, Cafritz married Gwendolyn Detre de Surany, twenty years his junior. She was daughter of Hungarian immunologist, Dr Laszlo Detre de Surany, co-discoverer of the Wassermann test for syphilis, and his wife, Lillian Coblenzer, who settled at Washington in the 1920s and he became chief immunologist for the United States Public Health Service. Cafritz and Gwendolyn had 3 children: Calvin, Carter and Conrad. His son Conrad married Peggy Cooper Cafritz. When Gwendolyn died in 1988, her instructions to leave her entire estate to the foundation was challenged by her children, who were already multimillionaires.

His granddaughter is musician and guitarist Julia Cafritz. Their home was located on Foxhall Road and is now The Field School.

Among his second cousins were brothers Maxwell Chaffetz, an FBI special agent and grandfather of future Congressman Jason Chaffetz, and Hammond E. Chaffetz, who pioneered federal antitrust prosecution policies later upheld by the U.S. Supreme Court in United States v. Socony-Vacuum Oil Co., before building Kirkland & Ellis into one of the most powerful law firms in the United States.

Morris Cafritz was a first cousin to famed violinist Jascha Heifetz.
