= Howard Ellis =

American lawyer

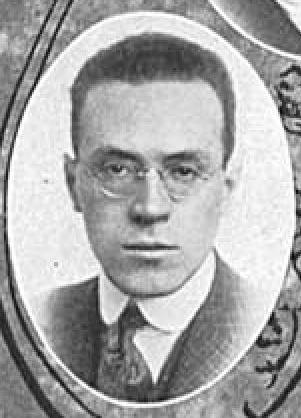

Howard Ellis (1892–1968) was a prominent Chicago lawyer and one of the name partners of Kirkland & Ellis.

== Biography ==
Howard Ellis was born in Washington Court House, Ohio on January 15, 1892. He was educated at the University of Chicago, receiving an LL.B. in 1914 and an LL.D. in 1915. He was admitted to the bar in 1915.

After law school, Ellis was hired by Weymouth Kirkland and, with Kirkland, joined the Chicago law firm of McCormick, Kirkland, Patterson & Fleming, the predecessor firm of Kirkland & Ellis. Eager to participate in World War I, in 1918, Ellis volunteered to serve in the United States Army but was rejected for physical deficiencies. He therefore went to France in April 1918 and served in the French Foreign Legion for the remainder of the war. After the war, Ellis returned to McCormick, Kirkland, Patterson & Fleming. There, Ellis became a close associate of Weymouth Kirkland and participated in some of Kirkland's most famous cases.

In 1919, Kirkland and Ellis defended Robert R. McCormick and the Chicago Tribune in a libel suit brought by Henry Ford. The Tribune had run an editorial in which it called Ford an anarchist for saying that any of his workers who volunteered to serve in the National Guard of the United States (which was then mobilized on the U.S. - Mexico border to prevent the Mexican Revolution from spilling into the United States) would be fired. At the three-month trial, Kirkland and Ellis argued that the Tribune's editorializing was fair comment. Ford ultimately prevailed in the case, but the jury awarded Ford only six cents in damages and six cents for costs. McCormick and the Tribune refused to pay the twelve cents, and Ford ultimately collected nothing.

Kirkland and Ellis again represented the Tribune when Mayor of Chicago William Hale Thompson brought a series of libel actions against the Tribune.

Kirkland and Ellis would win a major battle for freedom of the press in the Supreme Court of the United States with Near v. Minnesota, 283 U.S. 697 (1931). In that case, a Minnesota trial judge had declared a small Minnesota newspaper to be a public nuisance and permanently enjoined the newspaper from publishing because it had adversely criticized certain local politicians in violation of an injunction. When McCormick, who was then Chairman of the American Newspaper Publishers Association's Committee on Free Speech, found out about the case, he persuaded the American Newspaper Publishers Association to intervene in the case, with Kirkland serving as their lawyer. Kirkland lost the case in the Minnesota Supreme Court but later convinced the Supreme Court of the United States to declare that censorship was unconstitutional.

Ellis later represented the Tribune when antitrust charges were brought against the Associated Press. Ellis ultimately argued this case successfully in the U.S. Supreme Court.

During the largest antitrust case in history at the time - that involving DuPont - Ellis represented the Du Pont family. (The government was attempting to force the Du Ponts to dispose of their stock holdings in General Motors and the United States Rubber Company.)

After the death of Weymouth Kirkland in 1965, Ellis served as managing partner of the firm, which by then was known as Kirkland, Ellis, Hodson, Chaffetz, and Masters.

Ellis died in his sleep on February 18, 1968. He was 76 years old. He was survived by his wife, the former Maude Martin Evers; the couple did not have any children.
