= David Breach =

American businessman

- Education: Eastern Michigan University; University of Michigan Law School (JD)
- Occupation: Businessman
- Title: President, Vista Equity Partners
- Spouse: Emily Breach
- Children: 3

David Breach is an American businessman. He is currently president at Vista Equity Partners, an investment firm. Prior to joining Vista, Breach was a corporate group partner at the law firm Kirkland & Ellis.

== Early life ==
Breach grew up outside Toronto, Canada and moved to Michigan when he was a teenager. He earned a bachelor of business administration in marketing from Eastern Michigan University while working as a salesperson. He graduated with his JD from University of Michigan Law School in 1994.

== Career ==
After graduating from law school, Breach worked at Honigman Miller, a law firm in Detroit, for five years. He then joined Kirkland & Ellis in Chicago and served as a corporate group partner for 14 years. In this position, he helped establish a West Coast office in San Francisco for Kirkland. While working at Kirkland, Breach expanded the partnership between the law firm and Vista Equity Partners and advised Vista on several of the firm's acquisitions, including Tibco Software, TransFirst, Misys, and SumTotal Systems.

Breach joined Vista Equity Partners in 2014. Breach expanded the company's administrative and operational staff during his tenure as chief operating officer and chief legal officer at Vista.

In August 2021, Breach was appointed president of Vista while retaining his chief operating officer responsibilities. He serves on the firm's executive committee and private equity committees, as well as the private equity funds' investment committees. While working at Vista, he has sat on the board of several of the firm's portfolio companies, including Solera, Ping Identity, Mediaocean, Vertafore, Cvent and Datto.

== Personal life ==
Breach is married with three children. In 2017, Breach and his wife, Emily, established a scholarship at the University of Michigan's Law School with a $1 million donation.

In 2019, Breach established the Breach Family Foundation. In December 2020, Breach and the Foundation made a $5 million endowment for a deanship at the University of Michigan's Law School.
