= Greenwich Forest =

Coordinates: 38°59′31″N 77°6′52″W

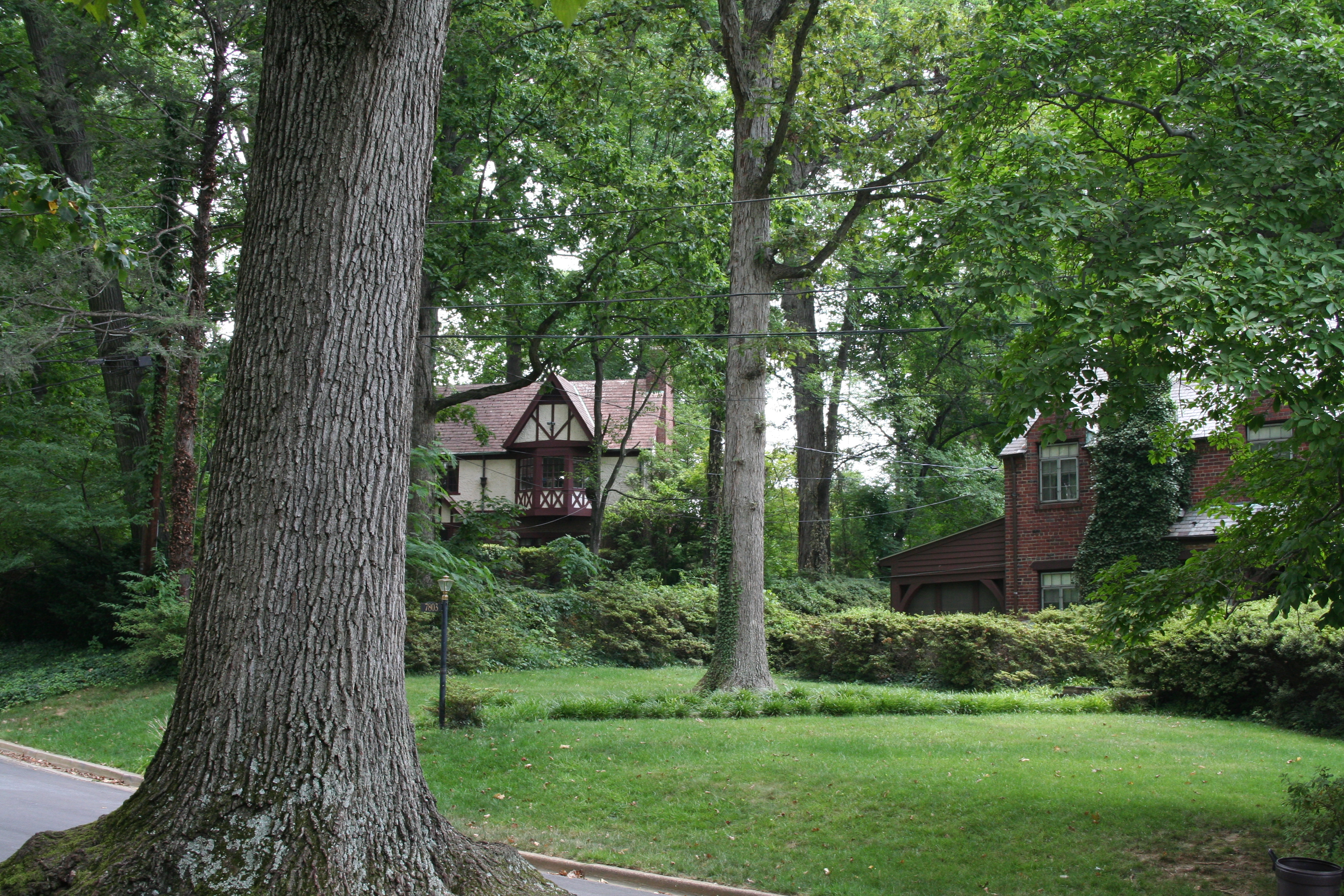
Greenwich Forest Historic District

Greenwich Forest is a residential community in Bethesda, Maryland, between Old Georgetown Road, and Bradley Boulevard.

Dating from the early 20th century, Greenwich Forest is a suburban neighborhood combining architectural design with the natural environment.

A portion of the Greenwich Forest subdivision was designated a local historic district in 2012 when it was included in the Montgomery County Master Plan for Historic Preservation.

== History ==
Prior to the passage of the 1968 Fair Housing Act, racially restrictive covenants were used to exclude African Americans and other racial minorities from the neighborhood. Greenwich Forest was advertised by real estate developer Morris Cafritz as "rigidly exclusive with protective restrictions." Unlike other neighborhoods in the DC suburbs that had antisemitic restrictions, such as Chevy Chase and Rock Creek Hills, Jews were allowed to live in Greenwich Forest, as Cafritz was Jewish and did not include anti-Jewish language in the covenants.
