= Arboretum (Washington, D.C.) =

- Neighborhood
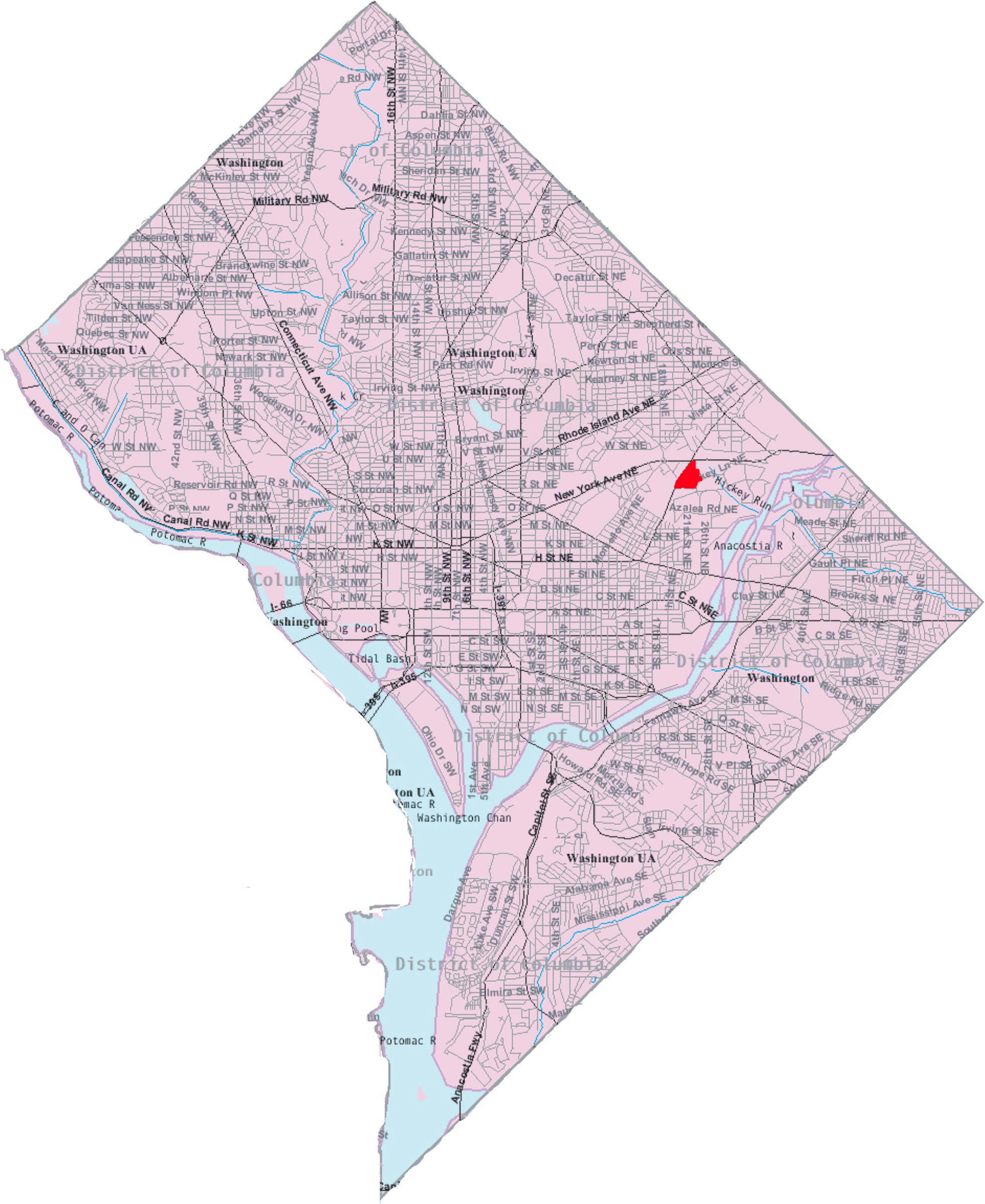
- Arboretum within the District of Columbia
- Coordinates: 38.914211°N 76.973089°W
- Country: United States
- District: Washington, D.C.
- Ward: Ward 5
- Developed: 1932; 94 years ago

Government
  - Councilmember: Zachary Parker
- Postal code: ZIP code

Arboretum is a predominantly residential neighborhood located in Northeast Washington, D.C., tucked into the corner of the National Arboretum.

The tiny neighborhood is bounded by New York Avenue NE to the north, Bladensburg Road NE to the west, and the National Arboretum to the south and east. The neighborhood includes the apartment community and three blocks of detached homes.

The neighborhood includes the Arboretum Community Center with several gardens and play areas. The Arboretum Neighborhood Association is the neighborhood's community organization.

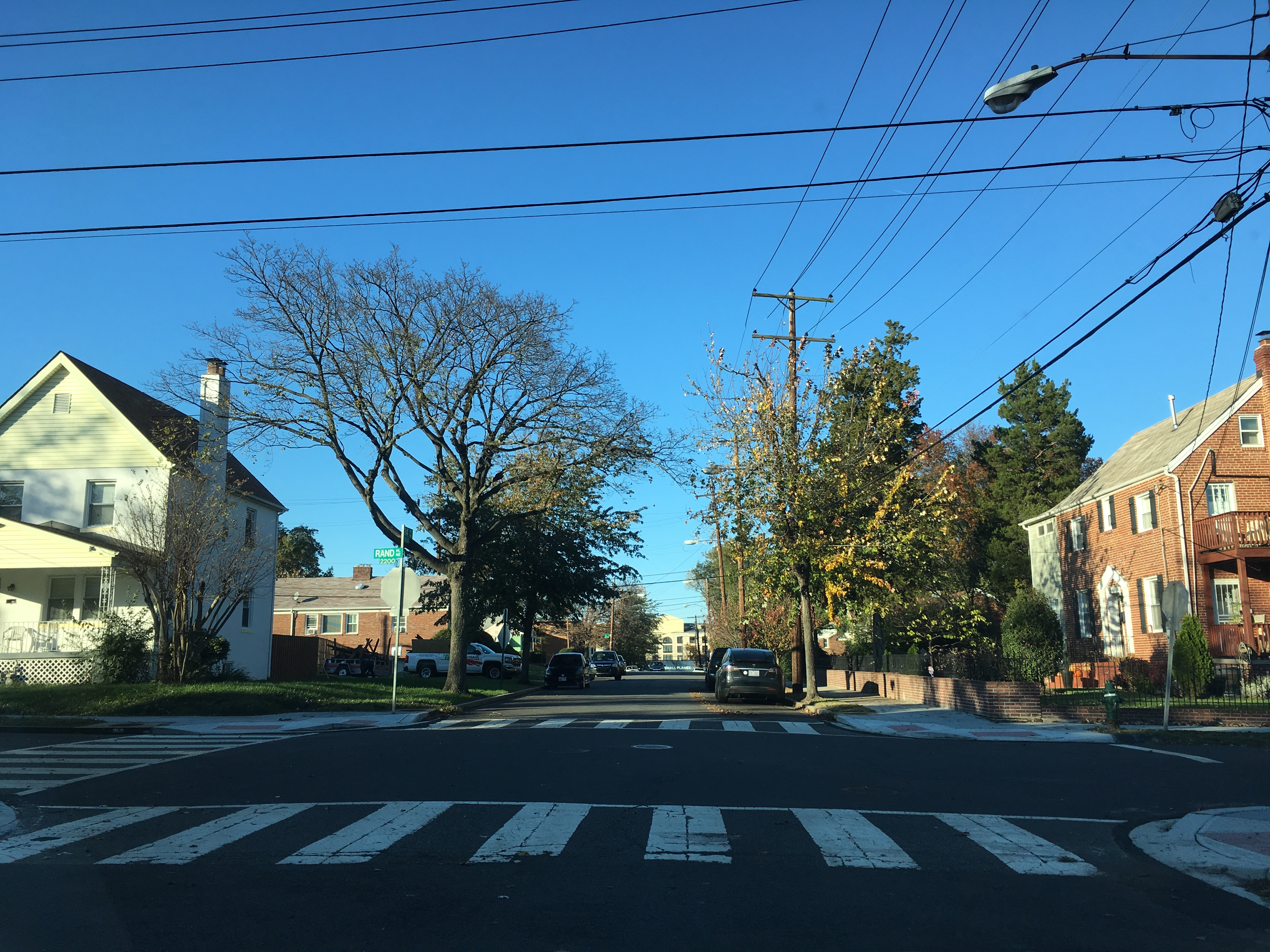
Arboretum neighborhood at the intersection of 24th Street and Rand Place NE, November 2018

== History ==
Until the 1930s, the area was virtually uninhabited with only one road, Bladensburg Road, passing by it. New York Avenue was extended to Bladensburg Road in 1931.

In 1932, Cafritz Construction began building the first homes in the neighborhood on Randolph Place NE, later renamed Rand Place NE. Prior to the passage of the 1968 Fair Housing Act, racially restrictive covenants were used to exclude African Americans and other racial minorities from neighborhoods developed by Cafritz Construction.

In 1935, Fox Brothers built some of the neighborhood's Colonial and English two-story brick detached homes. The development was marketed with the name The Village. Fox Brothers' advertisements listed the homes as for $6,750 each (equivalent to $159,000 in 2025).

In 1962, the 185-unit Parkway Plaza apartment complex was built. The developer of the apartment complex donated small parcels of land to the District, which are now the Arboretum Recreation Center and a Metropolitan Police Department station.

Advertisement in The Washington Post, July 21, 1935.
