= Jason Chaffetz =

American politician (born 1967)

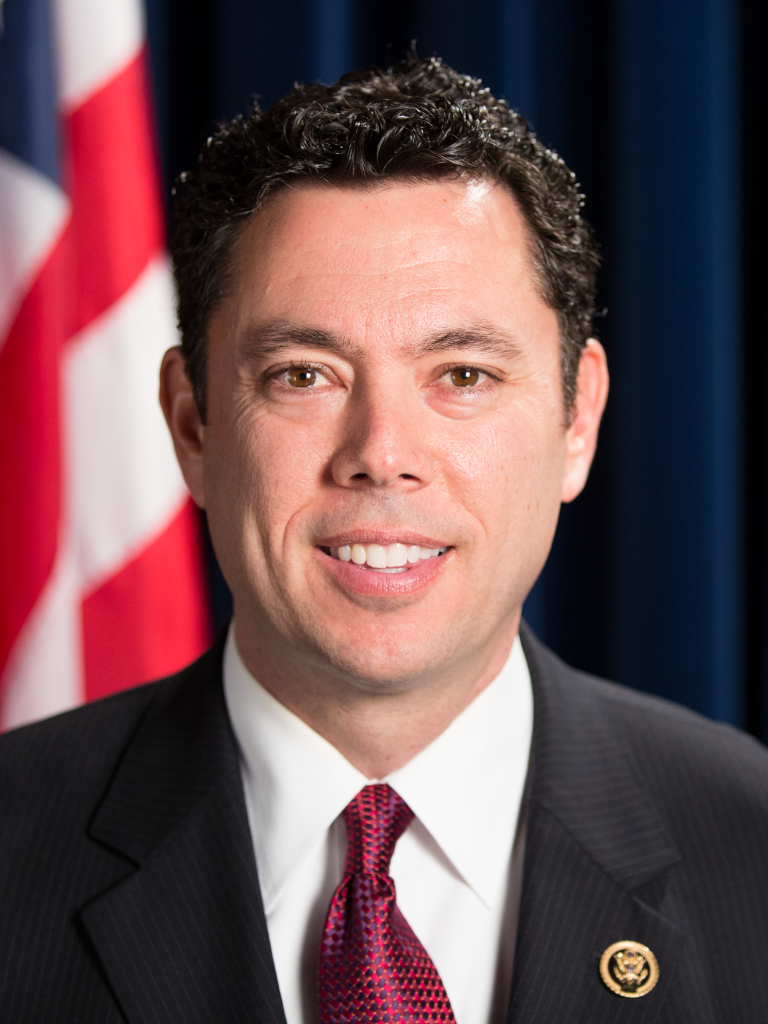
- Official portrait, 2016

Chair of the House Oversight Committee
- In office January 3, 2015 – June 13, 2017
- Preceded by: Darrell Issa
- Succeeded by: Trey Gowdy

Member of the U.S. House of Representatives from Utah's 3rd district
- In office January 3, 2009 – June 30, 2017
- Preceded by: Chris Cannon
- Succeeded by: John Curtis

Personal details
- Born: March 26, 1967 (age 59) Los Gatos, California, U.S.
- Party: Democratic (before 1990); Republican (1990–present)
- Spouse: Julie Johnson (m. 1991)
- Children: 3
- Relatives: John Dukakis (half-brother)
- Education: Brigham Young University (BA)
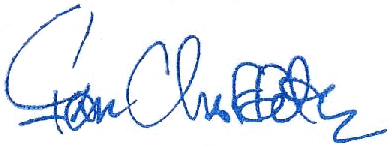
- Signature
- Chaffetz's voice Chaffetz supporting the Evidence-Based Policymaking Commission Act of 2016. Recorded July 27, 2015

Jason Edwin Chaffetz (Note: /ˈtʃeɪfɪts/) (born March 26, 1967) is an American retired politician who served as the U.S. representative for Utah's 3rd congressional district from 2009 until his resignation in 2017. He chaired the Committee on Oversight and Government Reform from 2015 until 2017.

Chaffetz came to prominence in 2015 for his extensive investigations into Hillary Clinton. He rescinded his endorsement of Donald Trump in early October 2016 but expressed his intent to vote for him three weeks later. Having investigated Clinton and the Obama administration extensively, Chaffetz drew criticism after the 2016 election for declining to investigate potential conflicts of interest relating to President Donald Trump, and that of other individuals involved in his 2016 presidential campaign and subsequent presidential administration.

He resigned from office in 2017, six months into his fifth Congressional term, and has since been a commentator, Fox News contributor, and author. In 2021, Chaffetz joined the Government Accountability Institute.

== Early life and education ==
Chaffetz was born in Los Gatos, California, and raised in California, Arizona, and Colorado. His father, John A. Chaffetz (1935–2012), was a businessman, and his mother, Margaret "Peggy" A. Wood (1942–1995), was a Christian Scientist who later became a member of the Church of Jesus Christ of Latter-day Saints and ran a photography business. In the late 1970s, his father became involved with the ownership group of the Los Angeles Aztecs, a professional soccer team. His father later wrote Gay Reality: The Team Guido Story, a book about a gay couple who competed on The Amazing Race. His younger brother, Alex, runs a Colorado-based media consulting firm.

Chaffetz's father was Jewish, and his paternal grandfather Maxwell (Max) Chaffetz (1909–1986), the son of immigrants from Russia, was an FBI Special Agent. Max Chaffetz was the brother of Hammond E. Chaffetz, who pioneered federal antitrust prosecution policies later upheld by the U.S. Supreme Court in United States v. Socony-Vacuum Oil Co., before building Kirkland & Ellis into one of the most powerful law firms in the United States, as well as the second cousin of Washington, D.C. real estate developer and philanthropist Morris Cafritz.

Chaffetz's father's first wife had been Kitty Dickson, who later married Michael Dukakis, future Massachusetts Governor and 1988 Democratic presidential nominee. The marriage lasted four years producing one son, John, Chaffetz's half-brother. Following Dickson's marriage to Dukakis, that son was adopted at age five by his stepfather, later deciding to change his surname to Dukakis when he was 18. While in college, Chaffetz worked as a Utah co-chairman of Michael Dukakis's 1988 presidential campaign. It was reported in 2009 and again in 2015 that Chaffetz remained close to his half-brother and the Dukakis family.

Chaffetz attended high school in California before graduating from Middle Park High School in Granby, Colorado. He attended Brigham Young University on an athletic scholarship and was the starting placekicker for the school's football team in 1988 and 1989. Over two seasons, Chaffetz converted 16 of 25 field goal attempts (64 percent) and 89 of 94 point-after attempts (95 percent). As of 2011, he still held the school's individual records for most extra points attempted in a game, most extra points made in a game, and most consecutive extra points made in a game. Chaffetz graduated from the BYU College of Fine Arts and Communications in 1989, with a B.A. in communications.

Raised Jewish, Chaffetz joined the Church of Jesus Christ of Latter-day Saints during his college years. In 1989, he met his future wife Julie Johnson at a wedding in Arizona when he was a senior and Julie was a junior at Brigham Young University. They married in February 1991. After college, Chaffetz worked for about a decade in public relations for a multi-level marketing company, Nu Skin International.

== Early political career ==
Chaffetz became a Republican after meeting Ronald Reagan in 1990, when Reagan visited Chaffetz's employer, Nu Skin, as a motivational speaker. However, his political views had been drifting more to the right even while working for Dukakis. In 2003, Chaffetz applied to be an agent in the United States Secret Service but was not accepted because "better qualified applicants existed". In 2015, the Secret Service Inspector General found that agents illegally accessed Chaffetz's personnel file that included that information after Chaffetz began heading investigations into the Secret Service.

In 2004, Chaffetz was the campaign manager for Utah gubernatorial candidate Jon Huntsman. Huntsman won the race, and when he took office in January 2005, Chaffetz became Huntsman's chief of staff. In 2005, Chaffetz started Maxtera Utah Inc., a corporate communications and marketing company. In 2006, Chaffetz was appointed by Huntsman as a trustee for Utah Valley State College. Chaffetz has also served as a member of the Highland City planning commission and as chairman for the Utah National Guard adjutant general review.

== U.S. House of Representatives ==
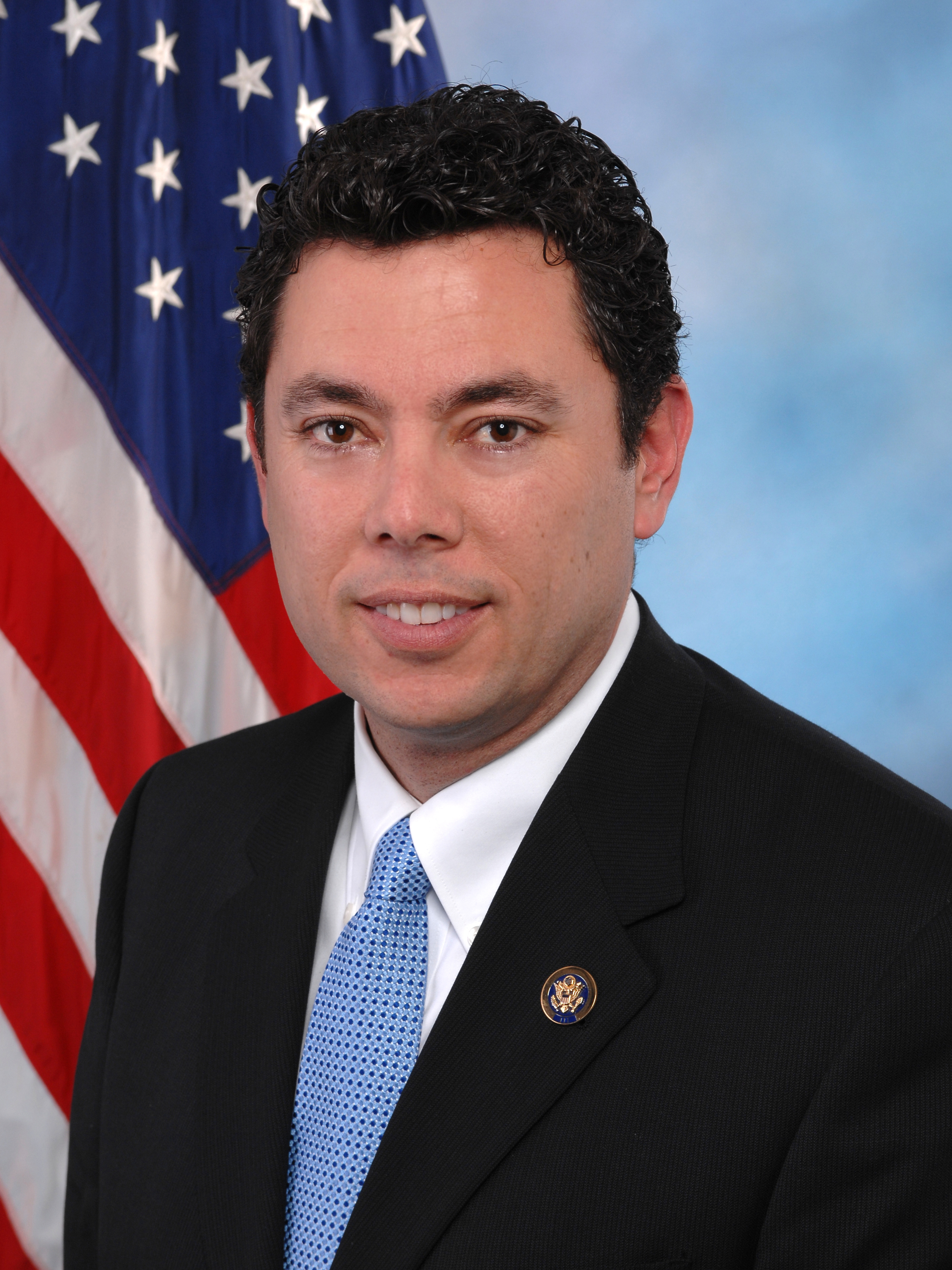
Chaffetz during the 111th Congress

=== Elections ===
==== 2008 ====
2008 Republican primary results Chaffetz: 50–60%; 60–70%; Cannon: 50–60%

After the nearly 1200 3rd District delegates to the state Republican convention were elected on March 25, 2008, Chaffetz sent a mailer announcing that he would run a different kind of campaign. He would have no paid staff, no campaign office, no free meals for delegates, no campaign debt and no polling. He committed to spend between $70 and $80 per delegate, telling voters, "How you run your campaign is indicative of how you're going to be in office."

Although Cannon was one of the most conservative members of the House, Chaffetz ran to his right. He said that Cannon "has failed us for not instituting conservative principles", consistently calling for a return to the core conservative principles of fiscal discipline, limited government, accountability and a strong national defense. He campaigned on stronger measures to fix legal immigration and remove the incentives for illegal immigration, an issue he continued to press throughout the campaign. The week before the convention, David Leavitt told The Salt Lake Tribune, "if Jason Chaffetz beats me [at the convention], Chris Cannon will be the congressman. Jason Chaffetz has no resources, no organization."

At the May 10, 2008, state convention, Chaffetz won 59% of the 3rd District's delegates to Cannon's 41%. He came a few hundred votes short of ending Cannon's career; had he tallied 60% of the delegates, he would have won the nomination without a primary. Leavitt finished a distant third, and immediately endorsed Cannon. Primary polls had shown a close race: a May 2008 poll showed Cannon leading Chaffetz 39% to 37% among likely voters, and June 2008 poll showed likely voters favoring Cannon by 44% to 40%. On June 24, 2008, Chaffetz defeated Cannon by a vote of 60% to 40%. It was considered an upset victory as Cannon was endorsed by George W. Bush, the state's two U.S. Senators Orrin Hatch and Bob Bennett, and nearly all of the state Republican establishment. Cannon also outspent Chaffetz by 6 to 1. Cannon's primary defeat spurred worry among Republican incumbents.

Chaffetz faced Democrat Bennion Spencer in the 2008 general election, along with Jim Noorlander of the Constitution Party. Chaffetz's firm position against asking for earmarks created some controversy during the general election campaign. Chaffetz said, "Until there's reform, I will not ask for them. They're a cancer within the system and I want to extract them." Ultimately, Chaffetz won election with 66% of the vote. However, he had effectively clinched a seat in Congress when he won the Republican nomination. The 3rd is one of the most Republican districts in the nation; in 2008 it had a Cook Partisan Voting Index of R+26.

Chaffetz announced at the start of the congressional term, in 2009, that he would be sleeping on a cot in his office, rather than renting a Washington, D.C., apartment. Chaffetz said, "I'm trying to live the example that it doesn't take big dollars in order to get where we want to go. I can save my family $1,500 a month by sleeping on a cot in my office as opposed to getting a fancy place that's maybe a little bit more comfortable." His family will continue to live in Alpine. "We are now $10 trillion in debt. $10 trillion. Those are expenses that have to be paid at some point", he said. If he can tighten his belt in these tough economic times, Chaffetz said, Congress should be able to as well. Chaffetz appeared on the "Better Know A District" segment of The Colbert Report on January 6, 2009, where he was defeated by Stephen Colbert in leg wrestling.

==== 2010 ====
Chaffetz won reelection to a second term, gaining 72% of the vote and defeating Democratic nominee Karen Hyer. The Salt Lake Tribune endorsed him in the race, writing "U.S. Rep. Jason Chaffetz, R-Utah, has delivered as advertised for Utah's 3rd District."

==== 2012 ====
In early 2012 Chaffetz worked as a representative of the Mitt Romney presidential campaign during primary season, shadowing the campaign of rival Republican candidate Newt Gingrich to offer rebuttals to reporters following Gingrich speeches. He refused to endorse Haitian-American candidate Mia Love, who ran against incumbent 2nd District congressman Jim Matheson, for the newly created 4th District seat. Nationally, Love had received campaign support from 2012 Republican presidential nominee Mitt Romney, House Budget Committee Chairman and 2012 Republican vice presidential nominee Paul Ryan, Speaker of the House John Boehner, and House Majority Leader Eric Cantor.

In his own 2012 election, Chaffetz won election to a third term, gaining 76% of the vote and defeating Democratic nominee Soren Simonsen, an architect and chairman of the Salt Lake City Council. The campaign was a "low-key" race in which Chaffetz was heavily favored.

==== 2014 ====
In the 2014 election, Chaffetz won election to a fourth term in a race in which he was again heavily favored. He received about 72% of the vote, defeating Democratic nominee, Brian Wonnacott.

==== 2016 ====
In the 2016 election, Chaffetz won a fifth term, defeating Democratic nominee Stephen Tryon, a former Overstock.com executive, with about 74% of the vote.

=== Committee assignments ===
- Committee on the Judiciary
  - Subcommittee on Intellectual Property, Competition, and the Internet
  - Subcommittee on Crime, Terrorism, and Homeland Security
- Committee on Oversight and Government Reform (chairman)
  - Subcommittee on Federal Workforce, U.S. Postal Service and Labor Policy
  - Subcommittee on National Security, Homeland Defense and Foreign Operations (chairman)
  - Subcommittee on Technology, Information Policy, Intergovernmental Relations and Procurement Reform

=== Caucus memberships ===
- House Baltic Caucus
- Congressional Arts Caucus
- Congressional Constitution Caucus

=== Chairmanship, House Oversight & Government Reform Committee, 2014–2017 ===
In November 2014, Chaffetz won a four-way race to become the chairman of the United States House Committee on Oversight and Government Reform. He was only the fifth Member of Congress in 89 years to become a full chairman after just three terms. He ran on a promise to emphasize reform, telling Politico that "the pitch I made to the steering committee is we really have to triangulate the problem if we're actually going to get to reform. In order to fix the problem long term, we can't just be the highlighter pen. We do a good job highlighting things, but we don't do a great job of fixing things."

=== Town hall protests in February 2017 ===
Chaffetz faced protests and jeering at a town hall meeting in February 2017. Attendees questioned Chaffetz about his political positions and whether he would hold President Trump to account. Chaffetz later accused the crowd of being paid protesters, and said that he may now avoid providing a venue "for these radicals to further intimidate." Chaffetz's unsubstantiated claim attracted scorn and anger from the town-hall attendees, some of whom sent mocking "invoices" to Chaffetz.

=== 2017 resignation ===
On April 19, 2017, Chaffetz abruptly announced that he would neither seek reelection to the United States House of Representatives nor run for any other elected office in 2018. At the time, he also implied that he might not finish out the current term. He took a three-week leave of absence from Congress to recuperate from foot surgery. Chaffetz announced his retirement from the House on May 18 effective June 30, six months into the two-year term. His resignation triggered the first Congressional special election in Utah in 87 years, which was won by Provo mayor John Curtis.

=== Government Accountability Institute ===
In 2021, he joined the Government Accountability Institute, a conservative think tank, as a distinguished fellow. The group was founded by Peter Schweizer and former Trump chief strategist Steve Bannon and largely bankrolled by the family of Robert Mercer.

== Post-congressional career ==
After leaving office Chaffetz became a commentator and author. On July 1, 2017, the day following his official resignation from Congress, Chaffetz became a contributor to Fox News where he serves as a regular guest/host on a variety of programs including Fox & Friends, America's Newsroom, The Faulkner Focus, Outnumbered, America Reports, The Five, The Ingraham Angle, Hannity, The Big Weekend Show, Fox & Friends Weekend, Fox News Sunday and Sunday Morning Futures.

He was a 2017 visiting fellow at the Harvard Institute of Politics (IOP).

He is the author of several books published since leaving office. His first book, The Deep State: How an Army of Bureaucrats Protected Barack Obama and Is Working to Destroy the Trump Agenda was published in September 2018 and became a New York Times bestseller. The following September he released Power Grab: The Liberal Scheme to Undermine Trump, the GOP, and Our Republic. 2021 saw the release of Chaffetz's third book, They Never Let a Crisis Go to Waste: The Truth About Disaster Liberalism, as well as a podcast, Jason in the House.

He witnessed the assassination of Charlie Kirk, a political activist and co-founder of Turning Point USA, during an event hosted by the organization at Utah Valley University in Orem, Utah.

== Political positions ==
=== Affordable Care Act ===
Chaffetz has repeatedly voted in favor of repealing the Affordable Care Act. In March 2017 Chaffetz drew criticism for and later walked back on a statement comparing the cost of healthcare coverage to the cost of purchasing an iPhone. In an interview with CNN he said, "So rather than getting that new iPhone that they just love and want to go spend hundreds of dollars on that, maybe they should invest in their own health care."

=== Budget and taxation ===
Chaffetz described Obama's attempts to introduce an inheritance tax on value over $5 million as "one of the most immoral things you can do".

=== District of Columbia legislation ===
==== Marijuana ====
In February 2015, Chaffetz threatened D.C. mayor Muriel Bowser with possible jail time if she implemented Initiative 71. The ballot initiative would legalize small amounts of cannabis in the district and was approved by about 64.87 percent of the voters in 2014. In a letter, Chaffetz asserted that D.C. officials who implemented the initiative would violate the Antideficiency Act (an 1884 act that bars government agencies from spending funds that have not been appropriated by Congress) because Congress had passed a Republican-supported appropriations rider providing that "none of the funds contained in this act may be used to enact any law, rule or regulation" to legalize or lessen the criminal penalty "for any Schedule I drug, including marijuana." Chaffetz's statement was rejected by Mayor Bowser, D.C. Attorney General Karl Racine, and D.C. police chief Cathy Lanier, who stated that I-71 was the law and implemented it as scheduled.

==== Other positions ====
In 2017, Chaffetz stated that he planned to seek a congressional vote to overturn D.C. legislation allowing terminally ill individuals to end their life. Local organizations decried Chaffetz's move, and District political leaders considered it an attack on the principle of District of Columbia home rule. Chaffetz also led the charge in an unsuccessful attempt to overturn the District of Columbia's legalization of same-sex marriage in 2009.

=== Energy and environment ===
Chaffetz has expressed his support for "an all-of-the-above energy strategy".

Chaffetz rejects the scientific consensus on climate change. In his 2008 stump speech, Chaffetz claimed global warming was a "farce." He has voted in favor of legislation that would bar the Environmental Protection Agency from regulating greenhouse gases.

Chaffetz advocates for the sale of millions of acres of publicly owned land to the highest bidder. In January 2017 Chaffetz introduced a bill, the Disposal of Excess Federal Lands Act (H.R. 621), which would have transferred 3.3 million acres of public land in ten Western states from the federal Bureau of Land Management to state ownership. Chaffetz said that the land served "no purpose for taxpayers." On February 1, following a backlash, Chaffetz announced via Instagram that he was withdrawing the resolution.

Chaffetz has opposed federal protection for Utah's resident greater-sage grouse, a bird whose population has shrunk from 16 million 100 years ago to about 200,000 today. In 2007, a court ruled that political tampering by Julie A. MacDonald, then-deputy assistant secretary for the United States Fish and Wildlife Service, had "tainted" the bird's assessment, and a new review was ordered. In March 2010, U.S. interior secretary Ken Salazar assigned the bird "warranted but precluded" status, paving the way for its future protection.

Chaffetz scored 0% in 2015, and 3% lifetime, on the National Environmental Scorecard of the League of Conservation Voters.

=== Foreign and defense policy ===
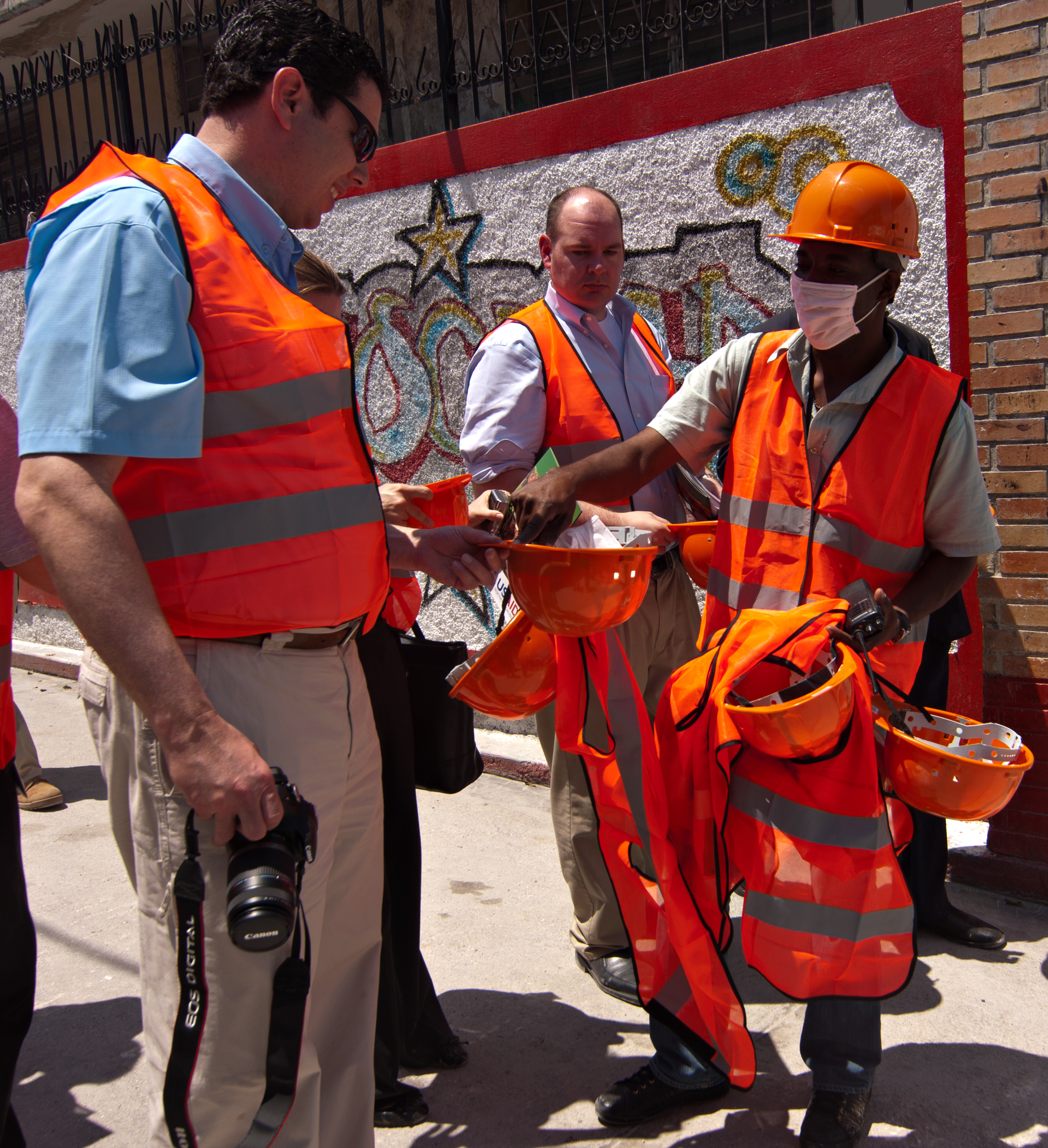
Chaffetz in Port-au-Prince, Haiti in 2011

==== Afghanistan ====
Chaffetz criticized the surge of 30,000 troops President Obama authorized for the war in Afghanistan, saying that the United States does not have a clear policy or exit strategy.

==== Benghazi attack ====
Chaffetz has been vocal against the White House and State Department's handling of the September 11, 2012, attacks on the US Consulate compound in Benghazi. The Administration first stated the attacks were sparked by a spontaneous protest, then later stated the violence was a planned terrorist attack.

There was a very conscious decision made, I believe—my personal opinion is that they wanted the appearance of 'normalization' there in Libya and building up of an infrastructure, putting up barbed wire on our facility would lead to the wrong impression. Something that this administration didn't want to have moving forward.

He criticized United States Ambassador to the United Nations Susan Rice's initial comments calling them "somewhere between an outrageous lie and total falsehood."

Chaffetz has been criticized for politicizing the Benghazi incident, acknowledging in an interview with CNN anchor Soledad O'Brien that he had "voted to cut the funding for embassy security" and that House Republicans had consciously voted to reduce the funds allocated to the State Department for embassy security since winning the majority in 2010. "Absolutely," he said. "Look, we have to make priorities and choices in this country."

==== Homeland security ====
In December 2009, Chaffetz championed legislation to limit the use of full-body imaging scanners at airports unless a metal detector first indicated a need for more screening. The images have come under intense scrutiny from privacy groups for allegedly letting security administrators view images of undressed passengers.

Chaffetz and Transportation Security Administration (TSA) have had a rocky relationship since he joined Congress. In his freshman year, in what critics have described as political grandstanding, he accused TSA agents at his hometown airport in Salt Lake City of unfairly targeting him to pass through a full-body scanning machine—a device Chaffetz believes is invasive. The Republican lawmaker said he believed he was targeted partially for his opposition to granting TSA screeners collective bargaining rights. A FOIA request by the Deseret News for video of the incident showed it to be a "tame and rather civilized exchange between the two." TSA's November 2009 report following their internal investigation primarily supported the Chaffetz version of the story. The union representing some of the officers said at the time that agents followed proper procedure and that an officer who had recently returned from military service in Iraq had not even recognized Chaffetz.

In 2014 and 2015, Chaffetz headed congressional hearings into United States Secret Service security failures in response to incidents at the time including a White House fence jumper, a CDC security guard being armed while riding an elevator with President Barack Obama, and agents crashing a car into a White House barricade. In a hearing on March 24, 2015, Chaffetz accused Joseph Clancy, then-director of the Secret Service, of "keeping Congress and the American public in the dark" by not allowing witnesses to testify regarding the car crash. In June 2015, James Comey announced that the United States Office of Personnel Management (OPM) had been the target of a data breach targeting the records of more than 18 million Americans. The OPM director Katherine Archuleta faced criticism at a hearing of the House Committee on Oversight and Government Reform in the wake of the revelation of the Office of Personnel Management data breach. Republican Committee chairman Jason Chaffetz said to her, "your systems were vulnerable, the data was not encrypted, it could be compromised, they were right!" and asked her why she ignored a recommendation to shut the system down in light of its vulnerability. Regarding Jakelin Caal Maquin, a seven-year-old girl who died in the custody of US Border Patrol on December 8, 2018, Chaffetz said on Fox News: "That should be the message, don't make this journey, it will kill you."

==== Chinese espionage ====
Beginning with his time as a Dublin, California city councilor, Eric Swalwell was targeted by a Chinese woman believed to be a clandestine officer of China's Ministry of State Security. Swalwell's general relationship with a suspected Chinese agent, Christine Fang, has been characterized as problematic, particularly given the high-profile role that he occupied – a member of the House Intelligence Committee – within the intelligence community. Chaffetz said that Nancy Pelosi "is the person that appoints people to that select committee. Why did they have to have him in that committee when they know that he has potentially been compromised? Rep. Swalwell has not denied the fact that this actually did happen."

=== LGBT issues ===
Chaffetz opposes same-sex marriage. After the District of Columbia legalized same-sex marriage in 2009, Chaffetz led the charge in attempts to overturn the decision taken by mayor of DC.

On the one-month anniversary of the 2016 Orlando nightclub shooting, Chaffetz chaired committee hearings on the First Amendment Defense Act, which would prevent the government from taking discriminatory action against people from taxpayer-funded entities and would protect tax exemption status of parochial organizations if they refused service to LGBT individuals on the basis of their religious beliefs. The American Civil Liberties Union, the Human Rights Campaign, the NAACP and Planned Parenthood Federation of America were among those who criticized him for it.

=== Net neutrality ===
Chaffetz opposes net neutrality, the principle that Internet service providers should not be allowed to discriminate or charge differentially by user, content, website or platform. In March 2015, he held hearings as to whether the Obama administration had secretly influenced the Federal Communications Commission when it adopted rules to ensure net neutrality.

=== Planned Parenthood hearings ===
In a September 2015 hearing, Chaffetz questioned Planned Parenthood's president Cecile Richards on her salary, and displayed a chart that he claimed was taken from Planned Parenthood's annual report that showed Planned Parenthood-provided abortions going up while cancer screenings and preventative care going down. In fact, the chart was actually taken from a Web post by an anti-abortion group, Americans United for Life, and was presented in a misleading way, using questionable "dual-axis" charting. Experts in data presentation said this was an egregious example of using a chart to mislead; Alberto Cairo of the University of Miami, an expert in visual communication, said it was a "damn lie," and Andrew Gelman, professor of statistics and political science, and director of the Applied Statistics Center at Columbia University, described the graph as a "truly immoral bit of graphical manipulation."

=== President Obama ===
In January 2010, Chaffetz was called upon to question Barack Obama when the president spoke to the House Republican Conference retreat in Baltimore. Chaffetz applauded Obama for some of the promises made during the campaign, but asked why promises to broadcast healthcare debates on C-SPAN, keep lobbyists out of senior positions, go line-by-line through the health care bill and end earmarks had not been kept. Video of the Q&A session received extensive media coverage.

Upon hearing that Obama had won the Nobel Peace Prize in 2009, Chaffetz said he had "lost all respect for the award" and that "it used to be one of distinction, but [now] it is hard to give it any credibility."

=== President Trump ===
==== 2016 presidential election ====
Following the Donald Trump Access Hollywood controversy, on October 7, 2016, Chaffetz was the first Republican member of Congress to rescind his endorsement of Republican presidential nominee Donald Trump. "I can't endorse somebody who acts and thinks like this." The Washington Post quoted Chaffetz as saying that he couldn't look his 15-year-old daughter in the eye and talk about what the GOP presidential nominee said, "It is some of the most abhorrent and offensive comments that you can possibly imagine." However, less than three weeks later, on October 26, 2016, he posted on Twitter that he was voting for Trump, while claiming that vote was not an endorsement: "I will not defend or endorse @realDonaldTrump, but I am voting for him." Chaffetz was also the first member of Congress and the only actual addressee recipient of FBI Director Comey’s confidential memo addressed to the Chairs and Ranking Members of the relevant House and Senate Committees to falsely leak that FBI Director Comey was reopening its investigation of Clinton's e-mails 11 days before the 2016 election. There was nothing in Comey’s letter that indicated the case was being reopened, instead, Comey stated "bureau investigators would review some additional emails that might relate to Hillary Clinton’s email server".

==== Oversight Committee chairmanship during the Trump administration ====
As chairman of the House Oversight and Government Reform Committee (which is tasked with investigating "waste, fraud, and abuse" in the executive branch), Chaffetz has been criticized for showing a disinterest in investigating President Trump's conflicts of interest and for failing to criticize him for not resolving ethical questions. Chaffetz has said that Trump's global financial ties don't merit a congressional investigation: "It's interesting, because under Section 208 of the criminal code, the president is exempt from almost every conflict-of-interest [law] ... I think the president has a duty and an obligation to live up to the Constitution and the law. And what he's required to do by law, it appears he's done." However, ethics experts have said that Trump's business conflicts and his failure to resolve them are "nakedly unconstitutional." Chaffetz also declined to investigate the circumstances surrounding the resignation of National Security Adviser Michael Flynn, who stepped down amid controversy over his communications with the Russian government before Trump took office. Chaffetz said that "it's taking care of itself" and that any investigation into Flynn was for the House Intelligence Committee to conduct; Chaffetz also asked the Justice Department inspector general to investigate the leaks that brought Flynn's contacts with Russian officials to public light.

Some commentators criticized Chaffetz's perceived lack of interest in Trump administration oversight, especially in light of Chaffetz's zealous investigation of items such as the CDC's use of the Sid the Science Kid cartoon character as part of an anti-Zika virus campaign and a December 2016 tweet from Bryce Canyon National Park welcoming the designation of a new national monument.

Chaffetz has also attacked those who have brought attention to Trump's conflicts of interest. In January 2017, Chaffetz threatened to investigate the independent Office of Government Ethics (OGE) after the Office had questioned Trump's commitment to resolve conflicts of interest. According to the New York Times, "Chaffetz, in his letter, noted his committee's authority to reauthorize the office, a hint that it could perhaps be shut down." Richard W. Painter, a former ethics lawyer in the George W. Bush administration, said that Chaffetz was trying to punish the OGE for criticizing Trump. A January 2017 poll by The Salt Lake Tribune and Hinckley Institute of Politics found that 65% of registered Utah voters supported a probe into Trump's conflicts of interest, compared to just 31% opposed.

Chaffetz said in January 2017 that he would continue his investigations into Hillary Clinton. In October 2016, when Clinton seemed likely to become the next President, Chaffetz said that he was already preparing for "years" of investigations of Clinton.

==== Michael T. Flynn ====
Chaffetz drew criticism again in January–February 2017 for his refusal to investigate White House National Security Adviser Michael T. Flynn's ties to Russia after it was revealed that U.S. counterintelligence agents were investigating him for his communications with Russian officials. The day after Flynn's resignation, a reporter asked Chaffetz whether he would investigate Flynn, and Chaffetz answered, "It's taking care of itself".

== Notes ==
U.S. House of Representatives
Preceded by Chris Cannon	Member of the U.S. House of Representatives from Utah's 3rd congressional district 2009–2017	Succeeded by John Curtis
Preceded by Darrell Issa	Chair of the House Oversight Committee; 2015–2017	Succeeded by Trey Gowdy
U.S. order of precedence (ceremonial)
Preceded by David Daniel Marriott as Former U.S. Representative	Order of precedence of the United States as Former U.S. Representative	Followed by Steve Largent as Former U.S. Representative
