= Chaifetz =

Chaifetz is a surname. Notable people with the surname include:

- Jill Chaifetz (1964–2006), American lawyer and children's rights advocate
- Richard Chaifetz (born 1953), American billionaire businessman, investor, licensed neuropsychologist, and philanthropist

== See also ==
- Chaffetz
