= Hammond Chaffetz =

American lawyer

Hammond E. Chaffetz (July 9, 1907 – January 12, 2001) was a federal prosecutor and partner at Kirkland & Ellis. He helped turn the law firm into one of America’s largest law firms.

== Early life ==
Born in Massachusetts, Chaffetz graduated from Harvard Law School in 1930.

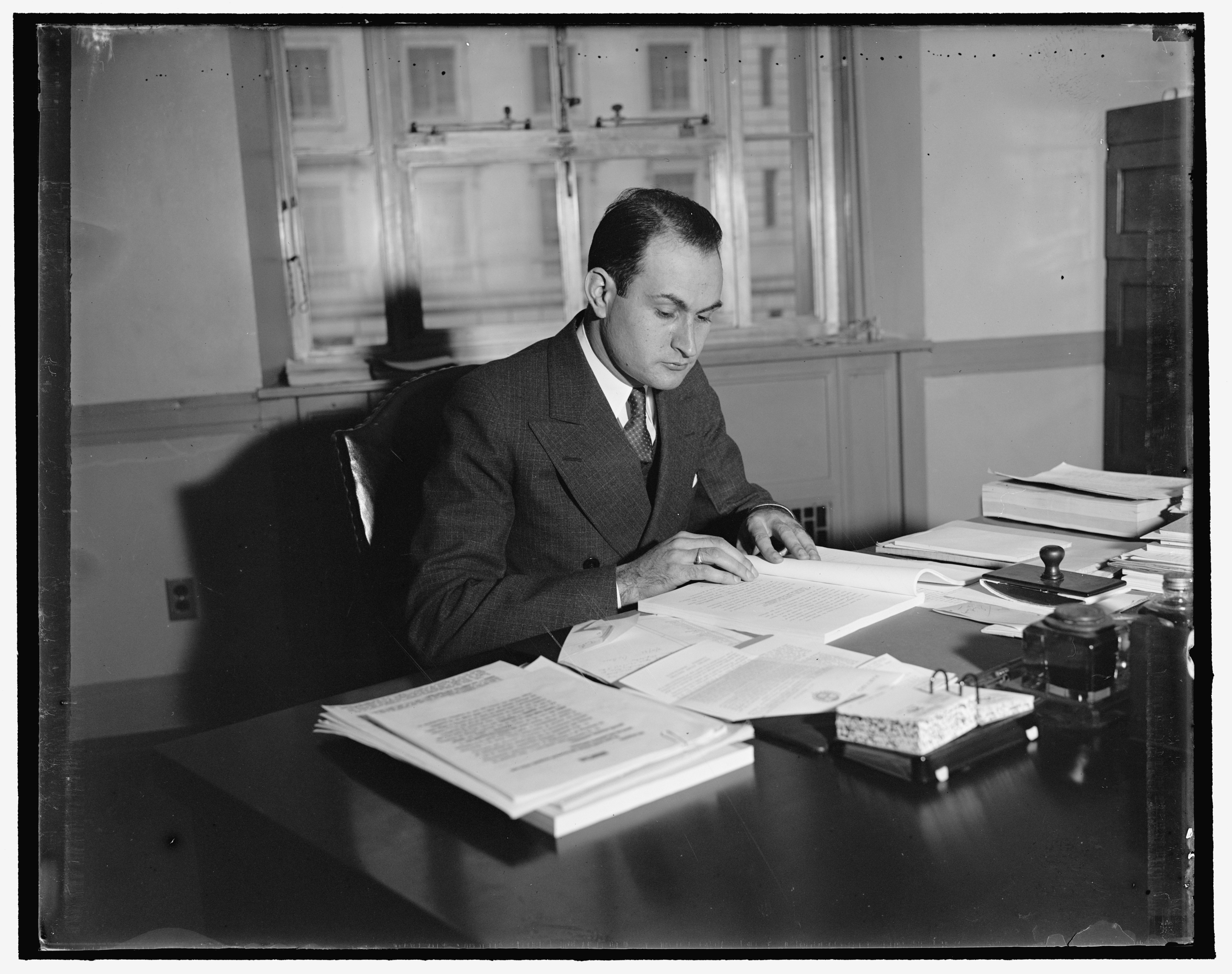

== Career ==
He joined the U.S. Department of Justice, where he became a Special Assistant to the Attorney General, pioneering federal antitrust prosecution policies later upheld by the U.S. Supreme Court in United States v. Socony-Vacuum Oil Co.

Chaffetz had been recommended for the position by one of his Harvard Law School professors, future U.S. Supreme Court justice Felix Frankfurter. Frankfurter, however, had also recommended one of Chaffetz's classmates, future accused Soviet spy Alger Hiss, for the same position, and it was Hiss's decision to withdraw that Chaffetz believed opened the position to him.

His victory over 16 oil companies in a price-fixing conspiracy soon caught the attention of Weymouth Kirkland, who was defending one of the oil companies. Kirkland offered the young lawyer a partnership at the Washington offices of the firm.

During World War II, he took a leave of absence and became a Navy lieutenant commander.

He rejoined the law firm after the war, and was moved to the Chicago offices. He was key to the law firm’s expansion, by recruiting young law students. He withdrew from active law practice in the early 1980s, but remained advisor until his death.

Chaffetz was also an active supporter of the arts in Chicago, most notably the Chicago Symphony Orchestra, the Goodman Theatre, and the International Theatre Festival.

== Family ==
Chaffetz's parents were Jewish immigrants from Russia and his father was a shopkeeper. His brother was Maxwell (Max) Chaffetz, an FBI special agent whose grandson is former Congressman Jason Chaffetz, and his second cousin was Washington, D.C. real estate developer and philanthropist Morris Cafritz.

== Sources ==
- https://web.archive.org/web/20070928035821/http://www.illinoisbar.org/Association/012-1i.htm
- http://www.kirkland.com/ourFirm/history.aspx
- http://www.law.harvard.edu/alumni/bulletin/2001/summer/memoriam_main.html
