= Yuri Heifetz =

Russian singer (born 1953)

- Born: October 31, 1953 (age 72); Sverdlovsk
- Other name: Boris Berg
- Occupations: Poet, singer-songwriter, and medical doctor
- Website: http://bergloga.ru

Yuri Heifetz (pen-name Boris Berg; Russian: Хейфец, Юрий Борисович; born 31 October 1953, in Sverdlovsk) is a Russian poet, singer-songwriter, and medical doctor.

== Biography ==
Yuri Heifetz wrote his first poem at age of 11, and his first song at age of 14, while studying at a music school in Sverdlovsk. In 1978 he created rock group "Eternal Spring", however the group was accused of ideological subversion by the KGB and disbanded. After graduating from medical school in Sverdlovsk, he worked as an epidemiologist and a gastroenterologist. In 1989 he left medicine and started working in the entertainment business.

In 1989, he released first album with his songs, "Bytovuha", in the genre of Russian chanson. He then traveled during three years through the Soviet Union as a member of pop music band Anons ("Announcement") under pen name of Boris Berg. He wrote texts of almost all songs for the band. He considered this period of his work mostly as creation of political satire. The band was directed by Aleksander Kasimov and reached its peak of popularity in the late 1980s - early 1990s by performing songs like "Olya and AIDS", which were seen as challenge to official Soviet stage.

In late 1989, Heifetz recorded and released his second album, "Abroad" . In 1992, he returned to medicine, but continued writing poetry, music and songs, and released new album, "Topol", in 2007. In addition to poetry, he wrote a fiction book, Epitaph. He is also active as internet blogger and conduct regular discussions on Russian politics, history and culture on a video blog, "Arbat Sitters", together with journalists Andrei Barkhatov and Alexander Orlov. He appears with his songs at Echo of Moscow in a program created by Natella Boltyanskaya. Heifetz now lives in Moscow. He is married and has three children.
