= Jill Chaifetz =

American lawyer

Jill Chaifetz (July 24, 1964 – February 2, 2006) was an American lawyer and children's rights advocate.

Chaifetz grew up in Hastings-on-Hudson, New York and graduated from Swarthmore College in 1986. She earned a Juris Doctor degree from the New York University School of Law three years later. In 1992, Chaifetz founded the Legal Services Center at The Door, a New York youth development agency. Through the center, she provided legal advice to young people, including many who were in foster care or homeless.

She headed Advocates for Children of New York from 1998 until her death from ovarian cancer at the age of 41.

== School named in memoriam ==
The Jill Chaifetz Transfer High School in the South Bronx, New York, is named after Chaifetz.
