= Weymouth Kirkland =

American lawyer

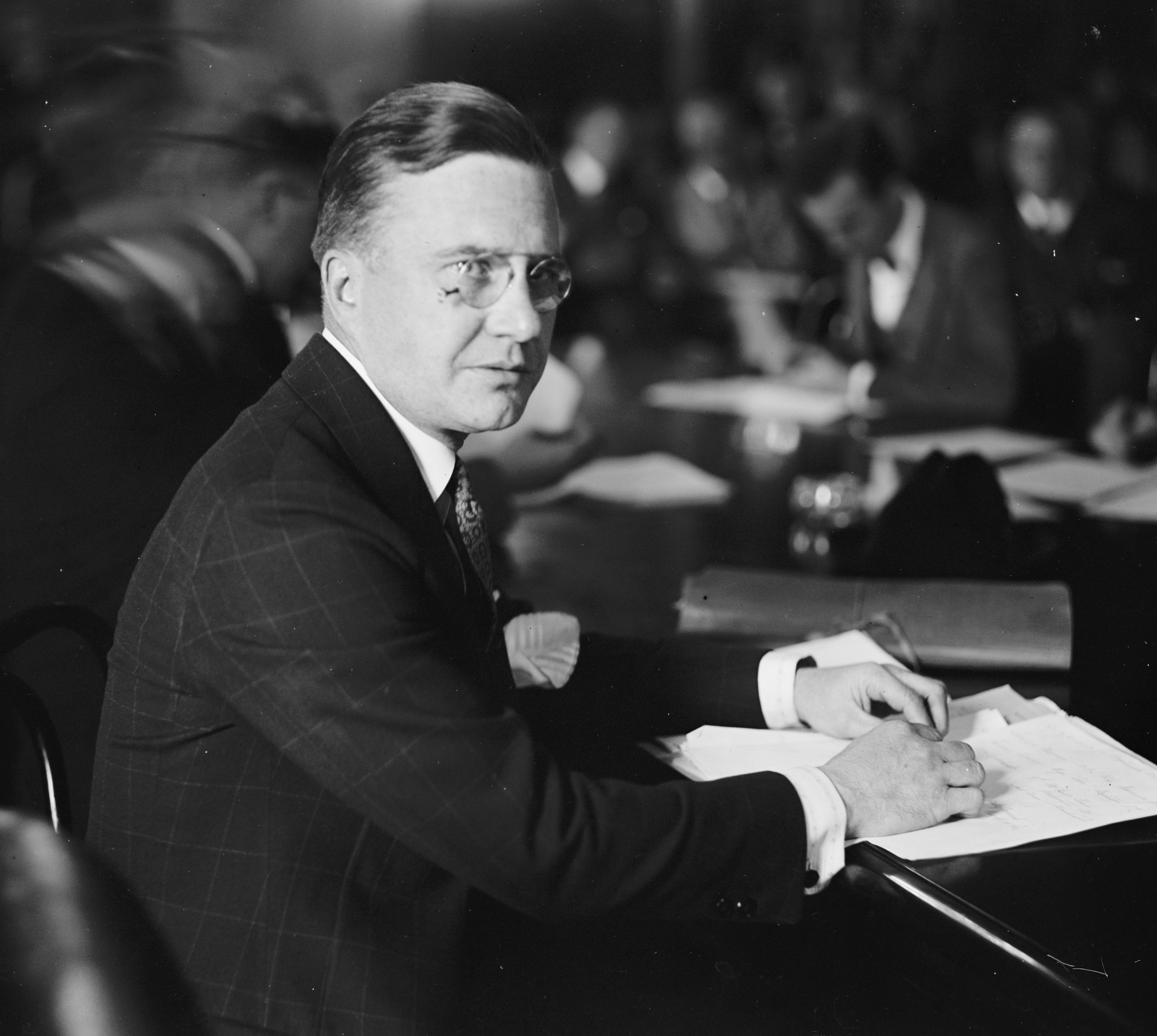
Weymouth Kirkland in 1924

Weymouth Kirkland (June 4, 1877 – February 3, 1965) was a Chicago lawyer and one of the name partners of the Chicago law firm of Kirkland & Ellis.

== Background, 1877–1901 ==
Weymouth Kirkland was born in Fort Gratiot Township, Michigan, on June 4, 1877, the son of James Kirkland and his wife Annie Weymouth Kirkland. His father's grandfather, also named James Kirkland, had fought at the Battle of Waterloo under the Duke of Wellington. Kirkland's paternal grandfather, Alexander Kirkland, was a Scottish architect and engineer who immigrated to the United States after graduating from the University of Glasgow; in 1879, Mayor of Chicago Carter Harrison, Sr. named Alexander Kirkland as Chicago's Commissioner of Public Works. Kirkland's father worked as superintendent of the shops of the Grand Trunk Railway in Port Huron, Michigan. Kirkland's mother's family had been in America since the seventeenth century, and his mother traced her ancestry back to William Bradford and John Alden.

Kirkland was raised in Fort Gratiot until he was fifteen years old, at which time he moved to Chicago and attended public schools. After school, he read law with prominent Chicago attorney Charles Hardy and then attended Chicago–Kent College of Law, graduating in 1901.

== Early years as a lawyer, 1901–1914 ==
After he was admitted to the bar in 1901, Kirkland and Thomas Symmes formed a law partnership, Kirkland & Symmes. They landed a plum client, Chicago Union Traction and later its successor, the Chicago Railways Company. In his first decade in practice, Kirkland gained a reputation as a first-rate trial lawyer and represented other large companies, including the Lake Shore Electric Company, the Standard Accident Insurance Company, and Travelers Insurance Company.

On October 6, 1906, Kirkland married Louise Stone, the daughter of George W. Stone of the Chicago Board of Trade. Together, the couple had a son, Weymouth, and a daughter, Eleanor.

== Years at Kirkland & Ellis, 1914–1965 ==
In 1914, Kirkland joined the law firm of Shepard, McCormick & Thomason, which had been founded in 1908 by Robert R. McCormick, owner of the Chicago Tribune. The firm was soon renamed McCormick, Kirkland, Patterson & Fleming. Kirkland became the first named partner at the firm in 1936, when the firm became known as Kirkland, Fleming, Green, Martin & Ellis; in 1958, the name was changed to Kirkland, Ellis, Hodson, Chaffetz, and Masters; today the firm is known simply as Kirkland & Ellis.

=== Free speech cases ===
At the new firm, Robert R. McCormick sent a steady stream of cases to Kirkland. When McCormick established the New York Daily News in 1919, Kirkland handled the legal work involved.

Also in 1919, Kirkland defended McCormick and the Tribune in a libel suit brought by Henry Ford. The Tribune had run an editorial in which it called Ford an anarchist for saying that any of his workers who volunteered to serve in the National Guard of the United States (which was then mobilized on the U.S. - Mexico border to prevent the Mexican Revolution from spilling into the United States) would be fired. At the three-month trial, Kirkland argued that the Tribune's editorializing was fair comment. Ford ultimately prevailed in the case, but the jury awarded Ford only six cents in damages and six cents for costs. McCormick and the Tribune refused to pay the twelve cents, and Ford ultimately collected nothing.

Kirkland was involved in another major freedom of the press case in 1920 when the City of Chicago sued the Tribune after the Tribune ran an editorial arguing that Mayor William Hale Thompson's policies had bankrupted the city. Kirkland argued that constitutional guarantees on freedom of the press should prevent governments from suing private citizens for libel; the Supreme Court of Illinois was persuaded and ultimately ruled that the common law doctrine of "libel on the state" had no place in a free republic.

Mayor Thompson later brought a second lawsuit against the Tribune, alleging that the newspaper had accused him of having pro-German leanings during World War I. During the trial, the illness of a juror led to a break in the proceedings, and the case was later dismissed for want of prosecution.

Kirkland won a major battle for freedom of the press in the Supreme Court of the United States with Near v. Minnesota, 283 U.S. 697 (1931). In that case, a Minnesota trial judge had declared a small Minnesota newspaper to be a public nuisance and permanently enjoined the newspaper from publishing because it had adversely criticized certain local politicians in violation of an injunction. When McCormick, who was then Chairman of the American Newspaper Publishers Association's Committee on Free Speech, found out about the case, he persuaded the American Newspaper Publishers Association to intervene in the case, with Kirkland serving as their lawyer. Kirkland lost the case in the Minnesota Supreme Court but later convinced the Supreme Court of the United States to declare that censorship was unconstitutional.

=== Other prominent cases ===
During the 1930s, Kirkland became a well-established antitrust litigator when he defended Standard Oil Company (Indiana) in the Madison Oil Company matter. In that case, the United States Department of Justice had successfully brought antitrust charges against 46 oil companies and individuals. Kirkland ultimately convinced Judge Patrick Thomas Stone to throw out all of the convictions against Standard Oil Company (Indiana).

Kirkland also represented the Associated Press when the Department of Justice brought antitrust charges against AP.

Kirkland served as attorney for the Chicago Board of Trade in a number of matters, challenging restrictions that had been placed on the Board of Trade as part of the New Deal and during World War II.

=== Outside activities ===
In addition to his legal practice, Kirkland was active in business and public affairs.

In 1933, Kirkland headed a syndicate that purchased the National Bank & Trust Co. and thereafter sat on that company's Board of Directors. He also was a director of Armour and Company for many years.

From 1928 to 1940, Kirkland was judge advocate of the Illinois National Guard, holding the rank of lieutenant colonel.

Kirkland was a member of the Chicago Club, the Racquet Club of Chicago, the Tavern Club (Chicago), the Mid-Day Club, and the Glen View Club. He was active in the American Bar Association, the Illinois State Bar Association, and the Chicago Bar Association. Politically, he was a Republican. He was also an active member of the Fourth Presbyterian Church of Chicago.

== Honors ==
In March 1957, the McCormick Foundation announced that it would provide funding to establish the Weymouth Kirkland Foundation. This foundation gives scholarships to students studying law in the Midwestern United States.

At Kirkland's 80th birthday party, held at the Drake Hotel on June 4, 1957, Edward H. Levi, the dean of the University of Chicago Law School, announced that the law school was naming its courtroom the Weymouth Kirkland Courtroom in Kirkland's honor. This courtroom was dedicated in April 1960.

== Death ==
Kirkland died on February 3, 1965, at Wesley Hospital, close to his long-time home at 209 East Lake Shore Drive. He was 87 years old.
