= United States v. Socony-Vacuum Oil Co. =

- Supreme Court of the United States

Argued February 5–6, 1940 Decided May 6, 1940
- Full case name: United States v. Socony-Vacuum Oil Co.
- Citations: 310 U.S. 150 (more) 60 S. Ct. 811; 84 L. Ed. 1129

Case history
- Prior: 23 F. Supp. 937 (W.D. Wis. 1938); reversed, 105 F.2d 809 (7th Cir. 1939); cert. granted, 308 U.S. 540 (1939).

Holding
- Price-fixing is illegal per se.

Court membership
- Chief Justice Charles E. Hughes Associate Justices James C. McReynolds · Harlan F. Stone; Owen Roberts · Hugo Black; Stanley F. Reed · Felix Frankfurter; William O. Douglas · Frank Murphy

Case opinions
- Majority: Douglas, joined by Hughes, Stone, Black, Reed, Frankfurter, Murphy
- Dissent: Roberts, joined by McReynolds

United States v. Socony-Vacuum Oil Co., 310 U.S. 150 (1940), is a 1940 United States Supreme Court decision widely cited for the proposition that price-fixing is illegal per se. The Socony case was, at least until recently, the most widely cited case on price fixing.

The language used in the Socony opinion has been widely quoted in subsequent judicial opinions. Some of the most widely quoted passages from Socony follow:

Any combination which tampers with price structures is engaged in an unlawful activity. Even though the members of the price-fixing group were in no position to control the market, to the extent that they raised, lowered, or stabilized prices they would be directly interfering with the free play of market forces. The Act places all such schemes beyond the pale and protects that vital part of our economy against any degree of interference. Congress has not left with us the determination of whether or not particular price-fixing schemes are wise or unwise, healthy or destructive. It has not permitted the age-old cry of ruinous competition and competitive evils to be a defense to price-fixing conspiracies. It has no more allowed genuine or fancied competitive abuses as a legal justification for such schemes than it has the good intentions of the members of the combination.

Nor is it important that the prices paid by the combination were not fixed in the sense that they were uniform and inflexible. Price-fixing . . . has no such limited meaning. An agreement to pay or charge rigid, uniform prices would be an illegal agreement under the Sherman Act. But so would agreements to raise or lower prices whatever machinery for price-fixing was used. . . . Hence, prices are fixed . . . if the range within which purchases or sales will be made is agreed upon, if the prices paid or charged are to be at a certain level or on ascending or descending scales, if they are to be uniform, or if by various formulae they are related to the market prices. They are fixed because they are agreed upon.

Under the Sherman Act a combination formed for the purpose and with the effect of raising, depressing, fixing, pegging, or stabilizing the price of a commodity in interstate or foreign commerce is illegal per se. ... Proof that a combination was formed for the purpose of fixing prices and that it caused them to be fixed or contributed to that result is proof of the completion of a price-fixing conspiracy under § 1 of the Act.

[A] conspiracy to fix prices violates § 1 of the Act though no overt act is shown, though it is not established that the conspirators had the means available for accomplishment of their objective, and though the conspiracy embraced but a part of the interstate or foreign commerce in the commodity.

Whatever economic justification particular price-fixing agreements may be thought to have, the law does not permit an inquiry into their reasonableness. They are all banned.

For almost 60 years after the Socony decision, the categorical language of that decision's statements, such as those quoted above, went substantially without qualification. At the end of the 20th century, however, the Supreme Court began to qualify the absoluteness of the Socony rules. In State Oil Co. v. Khan, and then Leegin Creative Leather Products, Inc. v. PSKS, Inc., the Supreme Court held that vertical price fixing (for example, agreed upon between manufacturers and retailers of their products) is no longer to be considered a per se violation of the Sherman Act, but should be evaluated under a rule of reason. (Note: A rule of reason analysis considers the reasonableness and justifications for a restrictive practice, and balances the anticompetive and procompetitive effects of the practice in order to determine net competitive effect and thus legality. Board of Trade of Chi. v. United States, 246 U.S. 231, 238 (1918). But see Herbert Hovenkamp, The Antitrust Enterprise: Principle and Execution 108 (2005) ("Meaningful balancing, which involves placing cardinal values on both sides of a scale and determining which is heavier, is virtually never possible. A court will rarely be in a position to compute a number that measures the social cost of any market power being exercised, and then another number that measures claimed benefits, and net them out.").) Horizontal price fixing among competing sellers, however, is still considered a per se violation of the Sherman Act.

== Background ==
In the 1920s and 1930s, the US oil industry had two principal components: (1) the so-called majors, "large vertically integrated companies that operated at every level of production and distribution," such as Socony, Standard of Indiana, Continental Oil, Gulf, Shell, and Phillips, that extracted oil, refined it into gasoline, and sold it to consumers through their stations; and (2) so-called independents, smaller firms that were not vertically integrated: independent refiners, wholesalers (so-called jobbers), and retail stations. In addition to distributing gasoline through their vertically integrated organizations, the majors distributed to independent jobbers under long-term contracts at a price based on the current spot-market price (for example, 2 cents above spot market), (Note: The "posted retail price in any given place in the Mid-Western area was determined by computing the Mid-Continent spot market price and adding thereto the tank car freight rate from the Mid-Continent field, taxes and 5 1/2. The 5 1/2¢ was the equivalent of the customary 2¢ jobber margin and 3 1/2¢ service station margin." 310 U.S. at 192.) which fluctuated in response to the volume being put on the market by the independent refiners.

In the 1920s, oil production had surged "as the automobile replaced the horse and buggy as the common person's means of transportation." But in 1929, the Great Depression began and "demand for oil fell precipitously." In 1930, "the largest oil field in history was discovered in East Texas." As a result of these two events, oil prices had fallen to 10 to 15 cents per barrel and gasoline was selling in Texas for 2 cents per gallon.

"[T]o stem the overproduction and consequent price decline that followed the development of the vast East Texas oilfield, discovered in October 1930," states established regulatory programs with production quotas. Production and shipment in excess of the quotas became illegal and was termed "hot oil." The independent refiners responded to the pressure of falling demand by flooding the market with hot oil. Although hot oil represented only about 5% of the market, its existence significantly depressed both the wholesale and retail prices of gasoline.

First, informally based on the provisions of the 1933 National Industrial Recovery Act (NIRA) forcing industries to raise prices on goods, and later on their own after the Supreme Court held the NIRA unconstitutional in 1935, the majors established a cartel program to divert hot oil from the market. The large, vertically integrated refiners bought "excess" or "distress" oil from the small, non-vertically integrated refiners that lacked sufficient storage capacity and were dumping oil on the market. This cartel program became known as the "dancing partner" program. It was estimated that "between 600 and 700 tank cars of distress oil flooded the Midwestern spot market every month from 17 independent refiners in the mid-continent field," and that removal of this oil from the market was needed to stabilize prices. A Socony official gave a speech explaining what the majors needed to do to alleviate their problem with prices. He said the oil industry was like an "old country dance." At this dance:

The majors had each asked some of the larger independent refiners to dance. But there were 7 or 8 smaller independent refiners – "wallflowers" . . . that no one wanted to dance with. . . . [We need] to introduce some of these wallflowers to some of the strong dancers, so that everybody can dance.

Under the dancing-partner program, if a small refiner had hot oil that it was prepared to dump on the market, its dancing partner would buy up the oil and sequester it. It soon became apparent that buying up the potential hot oil from only the Mid-Continent oil field. (Note: The Mid-Continent field covered Oklahoma, northern and western portions of Texas, the southern and eastern portions of Kansas, the southern portion of Arkansas, and the northern portion of Louisiana. This was the oil-producing region closest to Midwestern markets and therefore of most concern to the Midwestern oil majors. See Crane at 7.) would be insufficient to stabilize the Midwestern market. It was necessary to include the East Texas field. (Note: The East Texas Oil Field covers several counties in eastern Texas. It is the first-ranking oil field in the United States in terms of total volume of oil recovered since its discovery in 1930.) as well. Part of the dancing-partner arrangement was to meet weekly to determine what price should be paid for the hot oil. The dancing-partner program went into effect in March 1935 and oil prices began to stabilize. "Between March and June, prices rose from about 3 1/2 cents per gallon to about 4 3/4. By the middle of January, 1936, prices were above 5 cents." According to the Supreme Court, "The conclusion is irresistible that defendants' purpose was not merely to raise the spot market prices but, as the real and ultimate end, to raise the price of gasoline in their sales to jobbers and consumers in the Mid-Western area."

Despite the downfall of the NIRA, the majors continued to operate the dancing partner program to stabilize oil prices on a voluntary basis. (It had always been voluntary.) Although the majors accomplished their goal of price stabilization by decreasing the amount of gasoline placed on the market, the reduced volume caused some independent jobbers to complain. The dancing-partner cartel benefited the majors and the small, independent refiners. But the jobbers were compensated on a cost-plus basis. They sold to retailers at approximately 3 1/2 cents per gallon over the spot-market wholesale price that jobbers paid refiners. When gasoline prices were depressed, consumers bought more gasoline, and jobbers made more money; when gasoline prices were higher, consumers bought less gasoline, and jobbers made less money. By increasing the spot market price and hence lessening demand, the dancing-partner program hurt the jobbers.

In December 1936, the United States filed a grand jury's indictment in Madison, Wisconsin, charging that 27 corporations and 56 individuals "formulated and carried into effect an unlawful conspiracy to fix prices of gasoline." The indictment alleged "two substantially simultaneous buying programs or pools, one in the so-called Mid-Continent field, and the other in the so-called East Texas field." The defendants did this "for the purpose of artificially raising and fixing the price of gasoline at artificially high and non-competitive levels in the so-called spot tank car market and in the wholesale and retail market"; the major oil companies conspired to and did "buy gasoline in large quantities from time to time, in the Mid-Continent area in that spot market and in the East Texas field . . . in that spot market, which gasoline was not required to meet the needs of the respective major companies at the time, and that this was done for the sole purpose of bringing about an arbitrary and controlled rise in prices of gasoline." The conspiracy, as executed, "enabled these major companies, through the concerted purchase of a very small percentage of the total available gasoline for distribution in the Standard of Indiana territory, to raise the price to controlled levels and thereby unreasonably and unlawfully to profit on the sale of their own products."

== Proceedings in district court and court of appeals ==
The trial lasted nearly four months, during all of which time the jury was kept sequestered and in the custody of the marshal. The record ran to more than 12,000 pages, in addition to over 1,000 exhibits. The district court found the evidence sufficient to support the verdict and denied the defendants' motions for an order setting aside the verdicts and for a new trial, as to the verdicts of guilty against 12 of the indicted corporations and 5 individuals.

The United States Court of Appeals for the Seventh Circuit reversed the judgment. The court of appeals assumed that the dancing-partner program provided for the purchase of from one-fifth to nearly one-third of the gasoline sold by independent refiners in the Mid-Western field and one-fifth in the East Texas field. The spot market was from 5% to 7 1/2% of the gasoline sold in the relevant territory. The defendants sold about 80% of all gasoline in that territory.

Because the spot-market prices varied from day to day, so did the prices at which the defendants sold. These facts, the court of appeals said, made the case dissimilar to United States v. Trenton Potteries Co., in which price fixing had been held illegal per se. Here the price was not fixed at a definite level as it was in Trenton Potteries. Therefore, the per se rule of that case should not be applied here. Rather, the case here is similar to Appalachian Coals, Inc. v. United States, which allowed an arrangement by coal companies to eliminate distress coal in "making, an honest effort to remove abuses, to make competition fairer, and thus to promote the essential interests of commerce."

The depressed state of the industry "affords justification for the action of the defendants in treating surplus gasoline as an evil of the industry and in making a concerted effort to eliminate the same with a view of stabilizing the market, even though an increase in price might result; provided, of course, the program, either as planned or executed, did not go so far as to constitute an unreasonable restraint by unduly suppressing or interfering with fair competition.

The court of appeals reversed and remanded for a new trial. The government, however, sought review in the Supreme Court, which agreed to hear the case.

== Ruling of Supreme Court ==
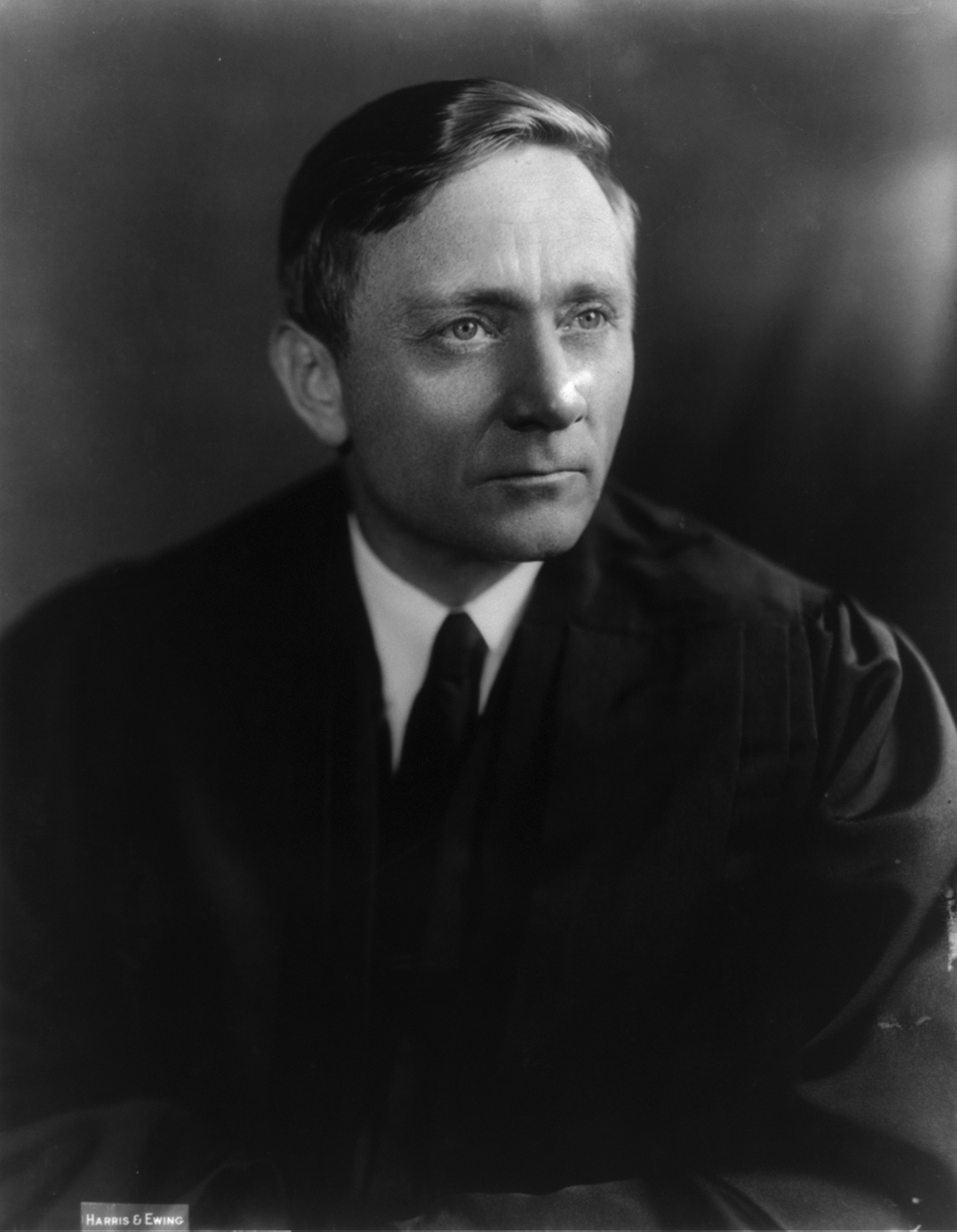
Justice Douglas

=== Majority opinion ===
Justice William O. Douglas, writing for the majority of the Court, reversed the judgment of the court of appeals and reinstated that of the district court.

The court of appeals had held that it was reversible error for the district court to charge the jury that price fixing was illegal per se; that it was immaterial how reasonable or unreasonable those prices were or to what extent they had actually been affected by the combination to fix prices; and that "knowledge or acquiescence of officers of the government or the good intentions of the members of the combination would not give immunity from prosecution" under the antitrust laws. The Supreme Court responded that it was established that the rule of reason did not apply to agreements to fix or maintain prices, and it is immaterial whether the price level fixed was reasonable. The cases on which the court of appeals and the defendants relied, such as Appalachian Coals, were all dismissed on the ground that no intent to fix prices was involved in those cases while in the case at bar the "direct purpose and aim [was] the raising and maintenance of spot market prices and of prices to jobbers and consumers in the Mid-Western area."

Justice Douglas dismissed the defendants' evidence that the government had urged them to form a cartel before the NIRA was held unconstitutional. The defendants had never obtained a formal statutory authorization under the NIRA. Apparently, the omission was intentional because of "impossible" conditions the government required. In any case there could be no antitrust immunity regardless of acts by government employees:

Though employees of the government may have known of those programs and winked at then or tacitly approved them, no immunity would have thereby been obtained. For Congress had specified the precise manner and method of securing immunity. None other would suffice.

Furthermore, any approval by government employees could not survive the expiration of the NIRA, and yet the dancing-partner program continued after that.

It was not error for the district court to refuse to charge the jury, as the defendants had requested, that in order to convict the jury must find that the resultant prices were raised and maintained at "high, arbitrary and non-competitive levels." The indictment so charged, but the law does not require that, and the language to that effect in the indictment was surplusage.

The Court rejected the attempted distinction between fixing prices at a specific level and variable but manipulated prices. "So far as cause and effect are concerned it is sufficient in this type of case if the buying programs of the combination resulted in a price rise and market stability which but for them would not have happened." Price fixing does not depend on inflexible prices. Prices are fixed for purpose of § 1 of the Sherman Act:

if the range within which purchases or sales will be made is agreed upon, if the prices paid or charged are to be at a certain level or on ascending or descending scales, if they are to be uniform, or if by various formulae they are related to the market prices. They are fixed because they are agreed upon. And the fact that, as here, they are fixed at the fair going market price is immaterial. For purchases at or under the market are one species of price-fixing. In this case, the result was to place a floor under the market — a floor which served the function of increasing the stability and firmness of market prices. That was repeatedly characterized in this case as stabilization. But in terms of market operations stabilization is but one form of manipulation. And market manipulation in its various manifestations is implicitly an artificial stimulus applied to (or at times a brake on) market prices, a force which distorts those prices, a factor which prevents the determination of those prices by free competition alone.

Furthermore, any form of tampering with prices is illegal price fixing: "Under the Sherman Act a combination formed for the purpose and with the effect of raising, depressing, fixing, pegging, or stabilizing the price of a commodity in interstate or foreign commerce is illegal per se."

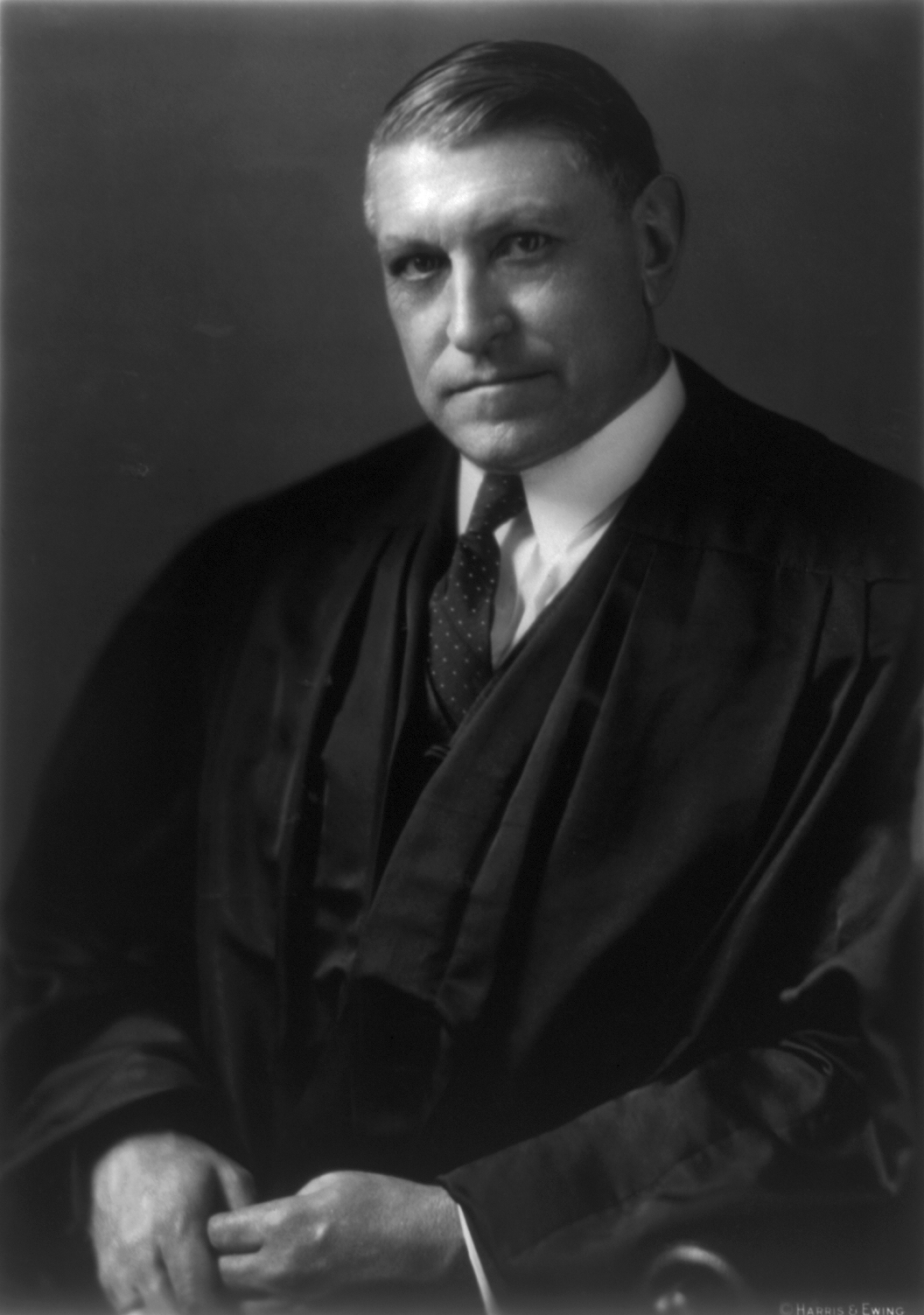
Justice Owen Roberts

=== Dissenting opinion ===
Justice Owen Roberts, joined by Justice McReynolds, dissented on the ground that venue had not properly been shown as to the Western District of Wisconsin and that government counsel had made arguments prejudicial to the defendants such as calling them "malefactors of great wealth."

== Subsequent developments ==
=== Per se vs. "rule of reason" ===
The reasonableness of price levels is still immaterial in price fixing cases. But the per se rule in price fixing cases is no longer inviolate. So-called vertical price fixes, in which a seller fixes the maximum or minimum resale price, are now judged under a "rule of reason," which permits the seller to assert pro-competitive justifications to defend the practice.

In the latter part of the 20th century, the Supreme Court began to qualify the absoluteness of various per se rules that it had previously declared—for example, allocations of territories, concerted refusals to deal, and tie-ins. In 1997, the Court relaxed the per se rule against sellers' fixing maximum resale prices, in State Oil Co. v. Khan, holding that sellers would be permitted to show pro-competitive justifications.

Then, in 2007, the Court extended that relaxation of the Socony per se rule to sellers' fixing of minimum resale prices as well, in Leegin Creative Leather Products, Inc. v. PSKS, Inc. Now, all vertical price fixing is no longer illegal per se but rather must be evaluated under a rule of reason. Horizontal price fixing among competing sellers, however, is still considered a per se violation of the Sherman Act.

=== Other price tampering conduct ===
For practices akin to horizontal price fixes, the Socony per se rule has been applied to various devices used to tamper with pricing. For example:

- National Soc'y of Prof. Engineers v. United States, 435 U.S. 679 (1978) – agreement among competitive engineers to refuse to discuss prices with potential customers until after negotiations have resulted in the initial selection of an engineer operates as an absolute ban on competitive bidding and thus prevents all customers from making price comparisons in the initial selection of an engineer.
- Catalano, Inc. v. Target Sales, Inc., 446 U.S. 643 (1980) – agreement among competing wholesalers to refuse to sell to retailers unless they make payment in cash either in advance or upon delivery is plainly anticompetitive and therefore illegal per se.
- Plymouth Dealers' Ass'n v. United States, 279 F.2d 128 (9th Cir. 1960) – auto dealers' agreement establishing a standard trade-in allowance and uniform "list price" from which to start bargaining is a price fix.

=== What constitutes price fixing ===
The rigor of the Socony case has been tempered by classifying some price-affecting conduct as not price fixing. For example, in Broadcast Music, Inc. v. Columbia Broadcasting System, Inc., the Court held that the per se rule against price fixing did not apply to contractual arrangements permitting Broadcast Music, acting as the agent of a group of competing music composers, to set a single price for a blanket copyright license to users covering all the composers' works. Writing for the majority, Justice White justified not using Socony's per se rule:

Finally, we have some doubt – enough to counsel against application of the per se rule – about the extent to which this practice threatens the "central nervous system of the economy". . . that is, competitive pricing as the free market's means of allocating resources.

In the BMI case, the blanket license arrangement clearly fixed a uniform price instead of permitting (or requiring) separate negotiation of the respective prices for hundreds of songs, since "the composers and publishing houses have joined together into an organization that sets its price for the blanket license it sells." The Court said that "as a practical matter it was impossible for the many individual copyright owners to negotiate with and license the users and to detect unauthorized uses." Therefore, a "literal approach" was not the proper way to analyze the case:

But this is not a question simply of determining whether two or more potential competitors have literally "fixed" a "price." As generally used in the antitrust field, "price fixing" is a shorthand way of describing certain categories of business behavior to which the per se rule has been held applicable. The Court of Appeals' literal approach does not alone establish that this particular practice is one of those types or that it is "plainly anticompetitive" and very likely without "redeeming virtue." Literalness is overly simplistic and often overbroad. . . . Thus, it is necessary to characterize the challenged conduct as falling within or without that category of behavior to which we apply the label "per se price fixing." That will ... not always be a simple matter.

In other words, Justice White asked, do the courts refuse to evaluate proffered justifications because it is price fixing or is it price fixing because the courts refuse to evaluate proffered justifications? Justice White concluded that the courts should evaluate the proffered justification (economic necessity) because:

[W]e cannot agree that it should automatically be declared illegal in all of its many manifestations. Rather, when attacked, it should be subjected to a more discriminating examination under the rule of reason. It may not ultimately survive that attack, but that is not the issue before us today.

Thus, the blanket license is not a price fix because the courts will evaluate its proffered justification.

== Commentary ==
● An aspect of the Socony case not discussed in the opinions is analyzed in Professor Andrew Verstein's recent article on the manipulation of benchmarks. The original indictment in Socony charged that the majors engaged in a conspiratorial manipulation of spot-market prices to raise the spot-market benchmarks on which wholesale and ultimately retail gasoline prices were based. "The oil companies, it was argued, bought up all the oil sold by third-party refiners in order to feed into benchmarks some very high market prices. That would assure them very high revenue from their many long-term sale contracts drawing on the benchmark. Against this, the oil companies presented evidence that (1) the oil companies bought at very low prices in the open market, such that their reporting would have lowered the benchmark; and (2) in any case, the benchmarks categorically excluded purchases by major oil companies from their methodology." This response caused the government to abandon this aspect of the case.

Actually, Verstein argues, this data strongly supported a different theory of manipulation. The majors bought up potential hot oil that was being priced below the market—oil that if included in calculating the benchmark (for example, if bought up by one of the jobber middlemen whose purchases were included in the benchmark) would have lowered the benchmark and thus lowered the prices the majors received for all of their oil. But the prices that the majors paid for the potential hot oil did not go into the benchmark, and the prices the jobbers would have paid did not go into the benchmark (because the jobbers never bought that oil). "By buying up any oil priced more cheaply than the current benchmark price, the oil companies could support the benchmark price against falling with the market." Since 91% of the potential hot oil that the majors bought was bought below the benchmark price, and the majors disqualified that oil from inclusion in the benchmark by buying it themselves, the dancing-partner program prevented a huge drop in the spot market benchmark. Apparently, the government failed to realize this.

● Another commentator, viewing developments subsequent to Socony, asserts that since that time "the Supreme Court has taken an increasingly nuanced approach to horizontal price fixing":

Because application of the per se rule is appropriate only where restraints undoubtedly will impede competition, cases in which there was not clear and unambiguous horizontal price fixing have prompted the Court to err on the side of caution and delve deeper before condemning the challenged arrangements. Because in complex modern markets, arrangements that have the effect of fixing prices may not necessarily result in net anticompetitive effects, what was once a very robust rule has been pared back and now seems appropriate only where literal price fixing can be readily identified.

● Michael Boudin criticized the Court's use of the metaphor of "the central nervous system of the economy" to describe competitive pricing, in footnote 59 of Socony. Boudin conceded that the metaphor was ingenious:

The implicit equating of price setting in the competitive market with "the central nervous system of the economy" is an ingenious argument by analogy. In some respects the central nervous system and the competitive pricing system can be viewed as structurally similar. The competitive market, like the central nervous system, does work by "signals" (prices, neural impulses). Each system can be viewed as a web or network connecting disparate parts of the whole (the body, the economy). In each, the proper functioning of the signaling system can be viewed as vital to the entity and disruptions as threatening (neurological disease, misallocation of resources). In short, out of these unspoken resemblances, the basis for an analogy has been fashioned. Acquiescing, the reader of the opinion is like a trial witness lured into an easy concession the import of which now becomes apparent.

He agreed that the use of this metaphor was "a fine piece of handiwork," both as dramatic literary rhetoric ("The image of tampering with the central nervous system provokes a sense of discomfort and unease that is doubly effective because it is felt rather than understood. These literary qualities conspire with the central analogy to make the metaphor persuasive.") and its persuasiveness to support the Court's refusal to consider defendants' power or effectiveness in fixing prices ("where the threat of harm is great and justifications are thought to be absent, it is efficient for judges to condemn the inchoate attempt without worrying about whether it could have been or was effective").

But he objected to the metaphor as misleading:

Although persuasive, the analogy contained in the metaphor is weak and the inferences it invites are doubtful. For example, the central nervous system analogy implies that the economy is a single, centrally directed organism. This may be an apt image for a marxist or other command economy. But Justice Douglas was concerned with pricing in a capitalist or free enterprise system, a regime of many individual decisionmaking units, interdependent but without a common source of authority. On the crudest level, dispersal of power among economic units suggests that anticompetitive behavior in one sector of the economy may pose less threat to the economy as a whole than does neurological disease to a single organism. . . . A single serious injury to the spinal column could cripple an individual for life. A major price conspiracy is likely to cause only limited damage for a limited period of time. . . . In short, the central nervous system analogy overstates the case against price tampering.
