= Kirkland & Ellis =

American law firm

Kirkland & Ellis LLP
- Headquarters: Chicago, Illinois, U.S.
- No. of offices: 23
- No. of attorneys: 4,145 (2026)
- No. of employees: 5,721 (2021)
- Key people: Jon A. Ballis, Chairman
- Revenue: US$10.6 billion (2025)
- Profit per equity partner: US$11.1 million (2025)
- Date founded: 1909; 117 years ago
- Founder: Robert R. McCormick
- Company type: Limited liability partnership
- Website: kirkland.com

Kirkland & Ellis LLP is an American white-shoe, multinational law firm headquartered in Chicago. Founded in 1909, it is the largest law firm in the world by revenue and is the seventh-largest law firm by number of attorneys as of 2025. The firm's alumni include several notable judges and government officials, including U.S. Supreme Court Justice Brett Kavanaugh and former U.S. Attorneys General William Barr and Robert Bork.

== History ==
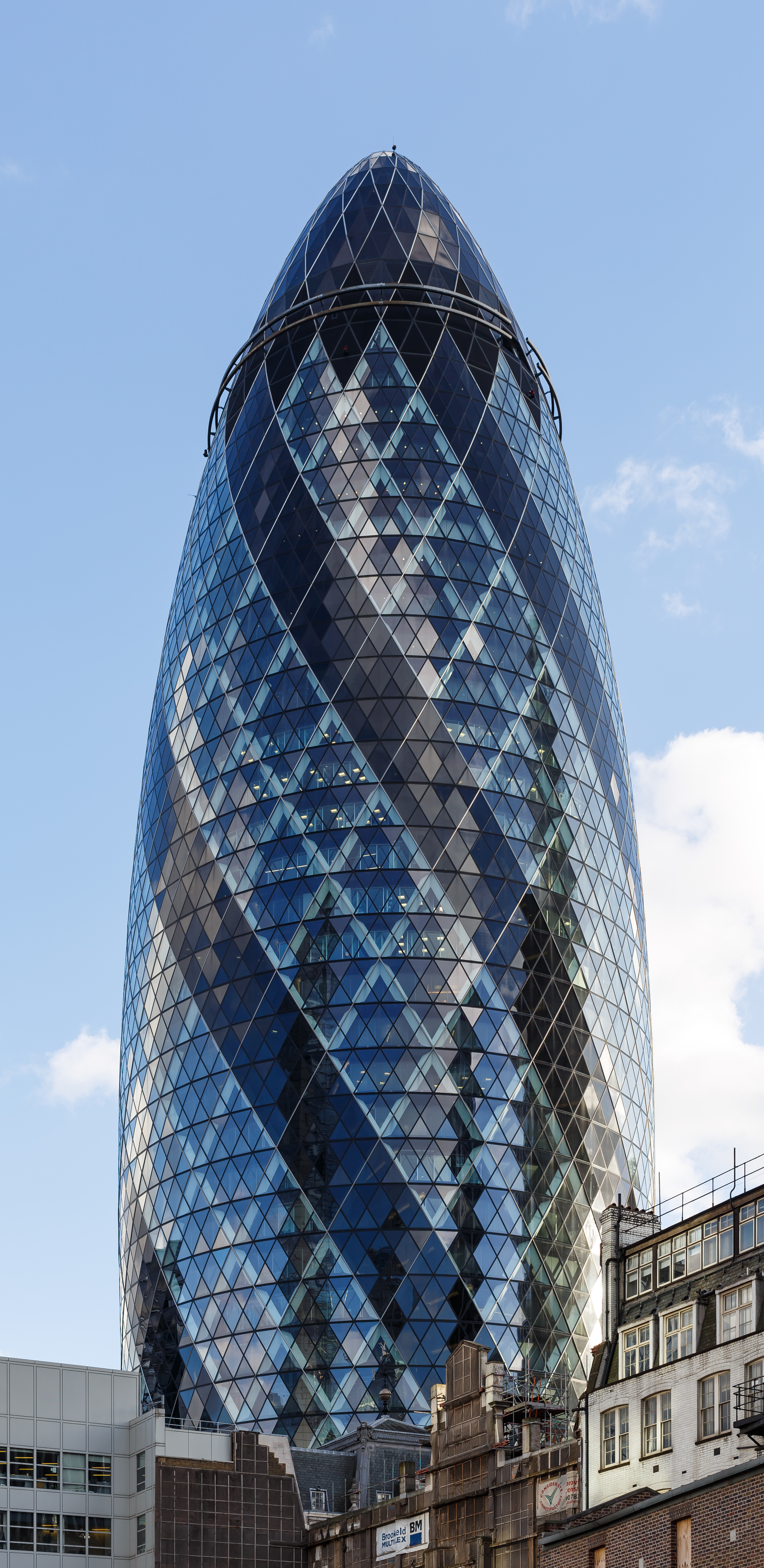
The firm's London office is at 30 St Mary Axe, known as The Gherkin.

=== 20th century ===
In 1909, two attorneys, Stuart G. Shepard and Robert R. McCormick, formed the Chicago-based partnership that would eventually become Kirkland & Ellis. McCormick was the grandson of Joseph Medill, who had founded the Chicago Tribune. McCormick became president of the Tribune Company in 1914 and, in 1925, sole publisher of the Tribune.

Weymouth Kirkland and his associate Howard Ellis joined the firm in 1915. Kirkland served as chief counsel to the Tribune and other newspapers in various free speech and defamation cases, including Near v. Minnesota.

In 1938, Kirkland and Ellis hired young trial lawyer Hammond Chaffetz from the U.S. Department of Justice. Chaffetz spent six decades with the firm, during which it grew to about 780 lawyers, making it one of the 30 largest in the country. Kirkland & Ellis has 20 offices in six countries.

Kirkland & Ellis opened its London office in 1994.

=== 21st century ===
The firm earned nearly $5 billion in revenue in 2020. The increase came from what was attributed to heightened demand during the COVID-19 pandemic. As of 2022, Kirkland & Ellis reported 490 equity partners and 763 non-equity partners. The firm saw over $6 billion in annual gross revenues, which was the most of any law firm that year. In 2023, Kirkland & Ellis achieved $7.2 billion in gross revenue, securing the top spot on The American Lawyer's 2024 Am Law 200 ranking. The firm was also recognized as the highest-grossing law firm in the world in the 2024 Global 200 survey.

In 2023, Kirkland & Ellis was named as a defendant in a racketeering lawsuit filed in Texas as Michael Van Deelen v. David Jones, et al. The complaint alleged that the firm conspired with former U.S. Bankruptcy Judge David R. Jones and Jackson Walker LLP to conceal a romantic relationship between Jones and a Jackson Walker partner, Elizabeth Freeman. This concealed relationship allegedly resulted in the award of inflated legal fees in several Chapter 11 proceedings, from which Kirkland & Ellis was said to have benefited. The U.S. District Judge Alia Moses dismissed the suit, ruling that the plaintiff lacked standing because the challenged legal fees would have been lost regardless of which law firm handled the cases. Moses criticized Jones's conduct as reflecting a "specter of impropriety" but concluded there was no actionable harm connecting Kirkland & Ellis or Jackson Walker to the loss claimed by the plaintiff.

In 2024, the firm reached a 22% increase in revenue, reaching $8.8 billion, with profits per equity partner rising to $9.25 million. The firm's strong performance was driven by its success in private equity, litigation, and M&A practices. In the same year, the firm also expanded its European presence by opening a new office in Frankfurt, Germany, to cater to its growing business in the region. Kirkland & Ellis elevated 151 attorneys to partner in 2024, a record for the firm.

In 2025, during the targeting of law firms and lawyers under the second Trump administration, it agreed to a deal with President Donald Trump, committing to provide $125 million in pro bono legal work on behalf of causes endorsed by Trump. In July 2026, the Department of Justice subpoenaed Kirkland & Ellis in an investigation of the deal.

Kirkland & Ellis became the first law firm to reach $10 billion in annual revenue, in 2025. doubling its income from 2020. That year, it expanded its Boston office by hiring three M&A partners, Graham Robinson, Laura Knoll, and Chadé Severin, along with around 15 associates.

== Rankings ==
The American Lawyer ranked Kirkland & Ellis as the 2018 Law Firm of the Year. "Mergers & Acquisitions" ranked Kirkland & Ellis as the 2019 Law Firm of the Year for advising on 400 U.S. based-deals (more than twice that of the firm ranked second), and for advising on the largest number of global deals, in each case, in 2019. As of 2021, Am Law lists Kirkland & Ellis as the largest law firm in the United States by gross revenue and third-largest in profits per equity partner. Kirkland & Ellis was ranked second in the 2017 ATL Power 100 law firm rankings. Vault ranked Kirkland & Ellis as the most prestigious firm in Chicago and the number-one firm in the U.S. for private equity, restructuring and business outlook in 2018.

== Notable clients and cases ==
- Brown & Williamson, a tobacco company. In 1995, Kirkland & Ellis made legal threats against CBS to prevent it from airing a 60 Minutes interview with tobacco industry whistleblower Jeffrey Wigand.
- Bristol-Myers Squibb in its US$90 billion acquisition of Celgene, the largest biopharmaceutical deal in history by terms of transaction value
- AbbVie in its US$63 billion acquisition of Allergan, which received the New York 2020 Healthcare, Pharma & Biotech Deal of the Year award by The Deal (magazine).
- GLP in its sale of U.S. Logistics Business to Blackstone for US$18.7 billion, the largest ever private real estate transaction globally in terms of trade value
- BP in relation to the 2010 Deepwater Horizon oil spill; secured a summary judgment ruling in favor of BP that it had no duty to report the Deepwater Horizon oil spill under the U.S. Emergency Planning and Community Right-to-Know Act
- Volkswagen in relation to the Volkswagen emissions scandal
- General Motors in relation to the General Motors ignition switch scandal
- Defended Nike, Inc. against trademark infringement claims regarding the Jumpman logo
- AbbVie, pharmaceutical company spun-off from Abbott Laboratories in 2013, in a royalty dispute with MedImmune; won a $93.8 million jury award
- MedTronic in a patent suit won against Atlas IP, LLC
- Miller UK Ltd., acquired a $73.6 million trade secrets misappropriation jury award against Caterpillar Inc.
- Jeffrey Epstein in a case of sex-trafficking with minors, resulting in a reduced charge plea bargain with limited penalties, which later garnered "accusations that the lenient sentence enabled Epstein to continue his abuse." Evaded legal obligation to notify victims of the plea bargain, thereby violating victims rights under the CVRA, by holding secret meetings with Alex Acosta's staff in the Marriott hotel
- McDermott International's 2020 Chapter 11 bankruptcy filing
- Toys R Us restructuring
- A group of major investors in the international fish meal industry, in connection with their claims against China Fishery
- Cariol Horne 2020 action for reinstatement to the Buffalo Police Department, having been fired in 2008 for intervening in an arrest that she perceived as being potentially lethal
- Kirkland & Ellis represented Boeing in relation to the Boeing 737 MAX disaster. Controversially, the U.S. Attorney in the case, Erin Nealy Cox, let Boeing executives off the hook for their role in the disaster in the prosecution agreement signed by her and Kirkland & Ellis. She was subsequently made a partner at Kirkland & Ellis.
- Kirkland & Ellis represented the New York State Rifle & Pistol Association in its case against Kevin Bruen, Superintendent of New York State Police. The case struck down as unconstitutional New York State's concealed carry law that required an individual to prove "proper cause" existed before a license would be issued allowing that person to carry a concealed pistol or revolver in public.
- Krafton Inc, a video game publisher. Kirkland & Ellis served as legal advisors in the acquisition of Subnautica developer Unknown Worlds Entertainment. After the founders of Unknown Worlds sued Krafton alleging wrongful termination to avoid a $250m bonus payout, Kirkland & Ellis, alongside Richards, Layton & Finger, were tasked with defending Krafton against the lawsuit. The case ended with Krafton being forced to reinstate Unknown Worlds CEO Ted Gill, and having to pay out the bonus in full. Ted Gill would resign afterwards

== Pro bono work ==
=== Second Trump presidency ===
On April 11, 2025, Kirkland was one of several law firms that the second Trump presidency pressured into its service. Kirkland said it would do $125 million in pro bono work for causes supported by Trump. The work turned out to include trade deals via the Department of Commerce. A year and a half later, a day after the Democratic Party won back control of the House and Senate in the midterm elections, Kirkland revealed to congressional Democrats that it had done $11 million worth of pro bono legal work for federal agencies — the Department of Commerce, the U.S. International Development Finance Corporation, the U.S. Postal Service and the Department of Defense — plus $18 million of pro bono legal work for causes.

=== Before second Trump presidency ===
The firm represented separated families, asylum seekers and other migrants, and nationwide class of immigrant teens held in ICE detention centers, in opposition to Trump administration family separation policy.

Kirkland attorney Michael D. Jones represented alumni and supporters of Maryland's historically Black colleges and universities (HBCUs) in a 15-year legal battle against the State of Maryland. The case, brought in federal court, claimed that the state had systemically underfunded the schools for decades. The matter was finally settled in 2021 when lawmakers approved $577 million in extra funding for the HBCUs in future state budgets. As part of the settlement, the state of Maryland agreed to pay $22 million in legal fees and costs, with $12.5 million going to Kirkland & Ellis. The remaining $9.5 million went to the Lawyers' Committee for Civil Rights Under the Law, which also provided legal representation for plaintiffs in the lawsuit. Kirkland's $12.5 million portion of the fees was later donated by the firm to a series of organizations that benefitted HBCUs and promoted civil rights. The allocation of fees included: $5 million to the Center for Racial Justice at Dillard University in New Orleans; $3 million to Morgan State University's Robert M. Bell Center for Civil Rights in Education; $2 million for the Lawyers' Committee for Civil Rights Under the Law; $1 million to the National Association for Equal Opportunity in Higher Education; $600,000 to Howard University's Thurgood Marshall Civil Rights Center; $600,000 to the Coalition for Equity and Excellence in Maryland Higher Education; and $250,000 to the African Methodist Episcopal Church Second District.

== Endowed professorships ==
The firm has endowed professorships in its name at four law schools: Harvard Law School, Northwestern University School of Law, University of Michigan Law School, and the University of Chicago Law School.

== Notable attorneys and alumni ==
Notable alumni of the firm include, among others, more than two dozen attorneys who resigned when appointed to roles in government. Alumni include:

- Alexander Acosta – former Secretary of Labor under President Donald Trump
- Alex Azar – former Secretary of Health and Human Services under President Donald Trump
- William Barr – 85th United States Attorney General under President Donald Trump and former 77th United States Attorney General under President George H. W. Bush
- John Bolton – former National Security Advisor under President Donald Trump
- Robert Bork – former Judge of the Court of Appeals for the D.C. Circuit and former Solicitor General under President Richard Nixon
- Daniel Bress – Judge on the United States Court of Appeals for the Ninth Circuit
- Rubén Castillo – former United States District Judge for United States District Court for the Northern District of Illinois
- Pat Cipollone – White House Counsel under President Donald Trump
- Jeffrey Clark – United States Assistant Attorney General for the Environment and Natural Resources Division under President Donald Trump; acting head of the Civil Division under President Donald Trump. Clark aided Trump in his unsuccessful efforts to overturn the 2020 election results.
- Paul Clement – former Solicitor General under President George W. Bush In June 2022, following his clients' Supreme Court victory in New York State Rifle & Pistol Association, Inc. v. Bruen, Clement separated from Kirkland & Ellis, after the firm announced it would "no longer handle Second Amendment litigation". Subsequently, Clement opened a boutique law firm, Clement & Murphy PLLC, with Erin Murphy, another former partner at Kirkland & Ellis.
- Viet D. Dinh – Chief Legal Officer at 21st Century Fox, former Assistant Attorney General under President George W. Bush and chief architect of the USA PATRIOT Act
- John C. Eastman – former professor at Chapman University School of Law who advised President Donald Trump on the legal strategy to overturn the 2020 presidential election.
- Neil Eggleston – former White House Counsel under President Barack Obama
- Mark Filip – former Judge of the District Court for the Northern District of Illinois and former Deputy Attorney General under President George W. Bush
- Josh Hammer – Newsweek senior editor-at-large, syndicated columnist, and host of The Josh Hammer Show
- Brett Kavanaugh – Associate Justice of the Supreme Court of the United States
- Robert Khuzami – Deputy United States Attorney for the Southern District of New York, former Director of the Division of Enforcement of the Securities and Exchange Commission and former General Counsel of Deutsche Bank
- Raja Krishnamoorthi – U.S. Representative from Illinois's 8th congressional district
- Christopher Landau – former US Ambassador to Mexico under President Donald Trump
- Jay Lefkowitz – former Special Envoy for Human Rights in North Korea and Director of Cabinet Affairs under President George W. Bush
- Lisa Madigan – former Illinois Attorney General from 2003 to 2019
- Sean Patrick Maloney – former U.S. Representative from New York's 18th congressional district
- Dallin H. Oaks – President of the Church of Jesus Christ of Latter-day Saints
- Jeffrey A. Rosen – Deputy Secretary of Transportation and Deputy Attorney General and acting United States Attorney General under President Donald Trump
- Nathan Sales – Coordinator for Counterterrorism and Acting Under Secretary for Civilian Security, Democracy, and Human Rights
- Danielle Sassoon – former acting US Attorney for the Southern District of New York
- Mikie Sherrill – Governor of New Jersey and former U.S. Representative for New Jersey's 11th congressional district
- Ken Starr – Whitewater special prosecutor and former Solicitor General under President George H. W. Bush
- Jeff Wall – Principal Deputy Solicitor General under President Donald Trump and former acting Solicitor General
- Ali Zaidi – former White House National Climate Advisor under President Joe Biden

== See also ==
- List of largest law firms by revenue
- List of largest law firms by profits per partner
