= Antisemitism in Washington, D.C. =

The history of Antisemitism in Washington, D.C. dates to the establishment of the district in the 18th century. Antisemitic covenants in real estate were common in the city during the early to mid 1900s. During the 2010s and 2020s, there has been an increase of reported antisemitic incidents in Washington, D.C.

== History ==
=== 20th century ===
==== Residential segregation ====
During the early to mid 20th century, Jews experienced antisemitic discrimination in housing in Washington, D.C. Because many white Christian neighborhoods in DC used antisemitic covenants to exclude Jewish people, Jewish real estate developers often choose to build neighborhoods in the Maryland suburbs of Montgomery County and Prince George's County. White Jewish real estate developers including Sam Eig and Esther Eig, Morris Cafritz, Jack and Abraham S. Kay, Carl M. Freeman, and Albert Small dispensed with antisemitic covenants but continued to use racial covenants to exclude African-Americans and other people of color from white neighborhoods. Racist and antisemitic covenants were declared unenforceable by a 1948 Shelley v. Kraemer Supreme Court ruling and were banned by the 1968 Fair Housing Act.

W.C. and A.N. Miller, a group of privately owned real estate firms in Bethesda, used restrictive covenants to exclude Jewish people and people of color from parts of Northwest DC as well as the Montgomery County suburbs of Bethesda, Chevy Chase, and Potomac. During the Civil Rights Movement, the company came under fire for its use of discriminatory covenants. In 1959, hearings before the U.S. Commission on Civil Rights, testimony noted bars against ownership by Jews in areas controlled by the Miller Companies including Wesley Heights and Sumner, with Spring Valley cited to be "of particular significance" owing to the prominence of its residents. Members of the public also cited the company's past discrimination in testifying against Washington awarding an urban renewal contract to an affiliated company in 1961. A typical covenant used by W.C. and A.N. Miller reads that "No part of the land hereby conveyed shall ever be used or occupied by, or sold, demised, transferred, or conveyed under, to, or in trust for, leased, or rented, or given to, Negroes or any person or persons of Negro blood or extractions, or to any person of the Semitic race, blood, or origin, which racial description shall be deemed to include Armenians, Jews, Hebrews, Persians, and Syrians, except that this paragraph shall not be held to exclude partial occupancy of the premises by domestic servants of the occupants thereof." In practice, covenants excluding "Semitic races" were generally used to exclude Jews, as DC and its suburbs did not have major Armenian, Greek, Syrian, or Turkish populations at this time.

=== 21st century ===
As of 2022, the Anti-Defamation League reported that two white nationalist groups operated in DC: the Patriot Front and Scott-Townsend Publishers. In 2021, propaganda produced by the neo-Nazi Patriot Front was used to target synagogues in DC and Jewish institutions in multiple states.

In 2023 and 2024, during the Gaza war, the Jewish Community Relations Council of Greater Washington reported a "dramatic uptick" in requests for help from parents, teachers, and students due to a surge in antisemitic incidents in Washington, D.C. and DC's suburbs in Maryland and Virginia.

In December, 2023, a man attacked Kesher Israel synagogue in Georgetown, spraying people with an odorous substance while allegedly shouting "Gas the Jews!" The assailant was arrested by the police.

== See also ==
- Antisemitism in Maryland
- Antisemitism in Virginia
- Francis Griffith Newlands Memorial Fountain
- History of antisemitism in the United States
- History of the Jews in Washington, D.C.
