= Antisemitism in Maryland =

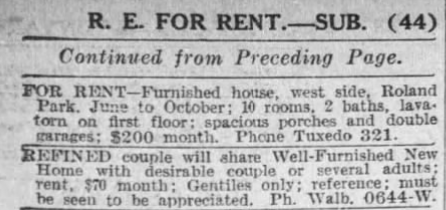
A May 7, 1922 advertisement in the Baltimore Sun for "Gentiles only" housing in Roland Park, Baltimore.

The history of Antisemitism in Maryland dates to the establishment of the Province of Maryland. Until 1826, the Constitution of Maryland excluded Jewish people from holding public office. Prior to the passage of the 1968 Fair Housing Act, Jewish people were excluded from living in many white Christian neighborhoods throughout Maryland due to the use of restrictive covenants and quotas. Between the 1930s and 1950s, quota systems were instituted at universities in Maryland to limit the number of Jewish people. During the 2010s and 2020s, Maryland has seen an increase in reported incidents of antisemitic vandalism and violence.

== History ==
=== 17th century ===
In 1658, Jacob Lumbrozo, the earliest confirmed Jewish settler in Maryland, was charged with blasphemy under the provisions of the 1649 Maryland Toleration Act for not believing in the Christian doctrine of the Trinity. The Act stipulated that any person who "shall...Blaspheme God...or deny our Saviour Jesus Christ to be the Son of God or shall deny the holy Trinity...shall be punished with death." Lumbrozo was freed from jail before his trial due to a general amnesty passed by the Maryland General Assembly following Richard Cromwell's succession to Lord Protector of England.

=== 19th century ===
In 1826, the Maryland General Assembly passed the Jew Bill, which was ""An Act to extend to the sect of people professing the Jewish religion, the same rights and privileges enjoyed by Christians." The act allowed Jewish people to run for public office. The act was promoted by Delegate Thomas Kennedy, a Christian opponent of antisemitic discrimination. Prior to the passage of the act, the Maryland Constitution of 1776 had required that "a declaration of a belief in the Christian religion" for public office holders. The act had previously been voted down several times between 1818 and 1826.

=== 20th century ===
==== Residential segregation ====
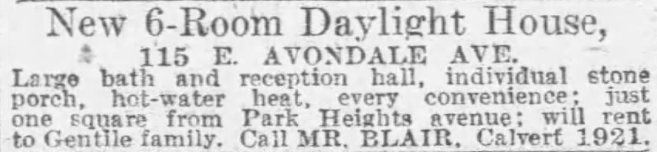
A 1923 advertisement in the Baltimore Sun for housing in Pimlico, Baltimore: "will rent to Gentile family."

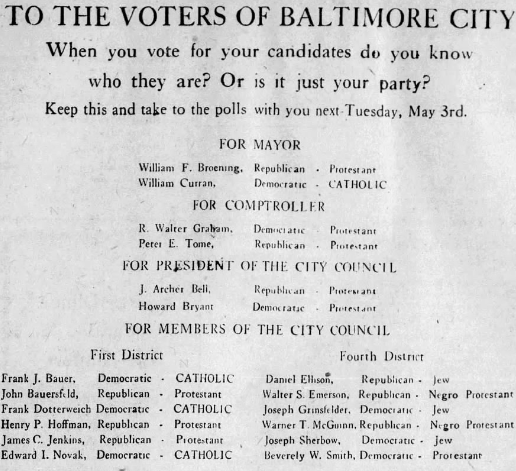
"To the Voters of Baltimore City", a 1927 announcement in the Baltimore Sun listing political candidates by race and religion: Jew, Catholic, Protestant, or Negro Protestant.

During the early to mid 1900s, many white Christian neighborhoods in Baltimore and the suburbs of Baltimore County and Montgomery County used restrictive religious and racial covenants to exclude Jewish people and other non-Christian and/or non-white people from owning homes. Antisemitic covenants and quotas were used to exclude Jews from Baltimore's Roland Park as well as several communities in Montgomery County, including Kensington, Chevy Chase, Potomac, and Bethesda. A typical antisemitic covenant in Kensington's Rock Creek Hills dating to 1946 reads that no property "shall never be used or occupied by...negroes or any person or persons, of negro blood or extraction, or to any person of the Semitic Race, blood or origin, or Jews, Armenians, Hebrews, Persians, and Syrians, except...partial occupancy of the premises by domestic servants." The real estate developer James W. Rouse used antisemitic quotas when building in the affluent and predominantly white Christian neighborhood of Roland Park. In 1951, Rouse enforced a quota of no more than 12% Jewish residents for the Maryland Apartment in north Baltimore until 75% of the apartments were rented. During the 1940s, the Jewish real estate developer Joseph Meyerhoff refused to rent or sell to fellow Jewish people in Roland Park in Baltimore. In 1948, the Baltimore Jewish Council wrote Meyerhoff a formal letter denouncing his complicity in antisemitic real estate practices and requested that he show solidarity with the Jewish community, but Meyerhoff insisted that his career would be ruined if he sold or rented to Jews in non-Jewish neighborhoods.

Because many white Christian neighborhoods in Washington, D.C. used antisemitic covenants to exclude Jewish people, Jewish real estate developers often choose to build neighborhoods in the suburbs of Montgomery County and Prince George's County. White Jewish real estate developers including Sam Eig and Esther Eig, Morris Cafritz, Jack and Abraham S. Kay, Carl M. Freeman, and Albert Small dispensed with antisemitic covenants but continued to use racial covenants to exclude African-Americans and other people of color from white neighborhoods. Sam Eig referred to the whites-only Rock Creek Forest neighborhood as "ideally located and sensibly restricted." Racist and antisemitic covenants were declared unenforceable by a 1948 Shelley v. Kraemer Supreme Court ruling and were banned by the 1968 Fair Housing Act.

W.C. and A.N. Miller, a group of privately owned real estate firms in Bethesda, used restrictive covenants to exclude Jewish people and people of color from parts of Bethesda, Potomac, and Northwest DC. During the Civil Rights Movement, the company came under fire for its use of discriminatory covenants. In 1959, hearings before the U.S. Commission on Civil Rights, testimony noted bars against ownership by Jews in areas controlled by the Miller Companies including Wesley Heights and Sumner, with Spring Valley cited to be "of particular significance" owing to the prominence of its residents. Members of the public also cited the company's past discrimination in testifying against Washington awarding an urban renewal contract to an affiliated company in 1961. A typical covenant used by W.C. and A.N. Miller reads that "No part of the land hereby conveyed shall ever be used or occupied by, or sold, demised, transferred, or conveyed under, to, or in trust for, leased, or rented, or given to, Negroes or any person or persons of Negro blood or extractions, or to any person of the Semitic race, blood, or origin, which racial description shall be deemed to include Armenians, Jews, Hebrews, Persians, and Syrians, except that this paragraph shall not be held to exclude partial occupancy of the premises by domestic servants of the occupants thereof." In practice, covenants excluding "Semitic races" were generally used to exclude Jews as Montgomery County did not have notable Armenian, Greek, Iranian, Syrian, or Turkish populations.

==== Antisemitic quotas ====
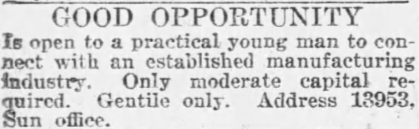
1922 job listing in the Baltimore Sun: "Gentile only".

Beginning in 1938, the University of Maryland School of Medicine instituted antisemitic quotas limiting Jewish applications to 14%. The school also limited the number of local applicants in an attempt to reduce the number of Jewish students, given the large number of Jewish people living in the Maryland suburban communities of Prince George's and Montgomery counties. The anti-Jewish quota system was abandoned in 1950.

Johns Hopkins University President Isaiah Bowman established antisemitic quotas in 1945 that limited admission of Jewish students, at a time when other leading universities were dismantling their Jewish quota systems. Restrictions were also instituted that limited the number of Jewish students who could pursue degrees in math and science. Bowman believed that Jewish people were an alien threat to American culture. The antisemitic quota system at Johns Hopkins was abandoned in the 1950s.

=== 21st century ===
The Southern Poverty Law Center lists several antisemitic hate groups that operate in Maryland, including The Barnes Review in White Plains, the Israelite School of Universal Practical Knowledge in Baltimore, and the white nationalist Patriot Front.

In December 2021, dozens of antisemitic fliers were posted in the Forest Estates neighborhood of Forest Glen. The fliers contained a conspiracy theory blaming Jews for the COVID-19 pandemic and promoted an antisemitic website that advocates Holocaust denial and supports Adolf Hitler.

During the early 2020s, the number of reported antisemitic incidents increased sharply in Maryland. In 2022, students in Montgomery County staged walkouts to protest antisemitic incidents in public schools. According to a report published by the Anti-Defamation League, antisemitic incidents increased from 55 in 2021 to 109 in 2022. In 2023, Maryland lawmakers introduced several bills aimed at curbing antisemitism in the state.

== See also ==
- Antisemitism in Connecticut
- Antisemitism in Florida
- Antisemitism in New Jersey
- Antisemitism in Virginia
- Antisemitism in Washington, D.C.
- Antisemitism in the United States
- History of antisemitism in the United States
- History of the Jews in Maryland
- History of the Jews in the United States
