= Antisemitism in Virginia =

The history of Antisemitism in Virginia dates to the establishment of the Colony of Virginia. Jews living in colonial Virginia had more rights than most Jews elsewhere in the world, but they did not begin to have equal rights with Christians until after the American Revolution. During the Civil War, Virginian Jews were often the subject of antisemitic accusations of profiteering and disloyalty to the Confederacy. In the early 20th century, educational institutions such as the University of Virginia used anti-Jewish quotas to reduce their number of Jewish students. Prior to the passage of the 1968 Fair Housing Act, some neighborhoods in Virginia excluded Jews using restrictive covenants. During the 2010s and 2020s, Virginia has seen an increase in reported incidents of antisemitic vandalism and violence.

== History ==
=== 17th and 18th centuries ===
While the small Jewish population in colonial Virginia had more rights compared to Jews living almost anywhere else in the world, they still did not have equal rights with Christians. While white Jewish people in Virginia participated in slavery and white supremacy, they were not always treated as equals to white Christians. Citizenship and holding public office in colonial Virginia required taking an oath of office to Jesus Christ, an oath that observant Jews could not take. The 1786 Virginia Statute for Religious Freedom, written by Thomas Jefferson, guaranteed religious freedom for Jews in Virginia.

=== 19th century ===
During the Civil War, the majority of the Jewish community of Richmond were in support of the Confederate States of America. Despite the majority of the Jewish community's loyalty to the Confederacy, antisemitic accusations were commonly made that the Jewish community had engaged in profiteering and had hindered the war effort. One Richmond newspaper, the Southern Punch, disparaged Richmond Jews and claimed that "dirty greasy Jew pedlar[s]" had engaged in "bowing and cringing even to negro servants."

=== 20th century ===
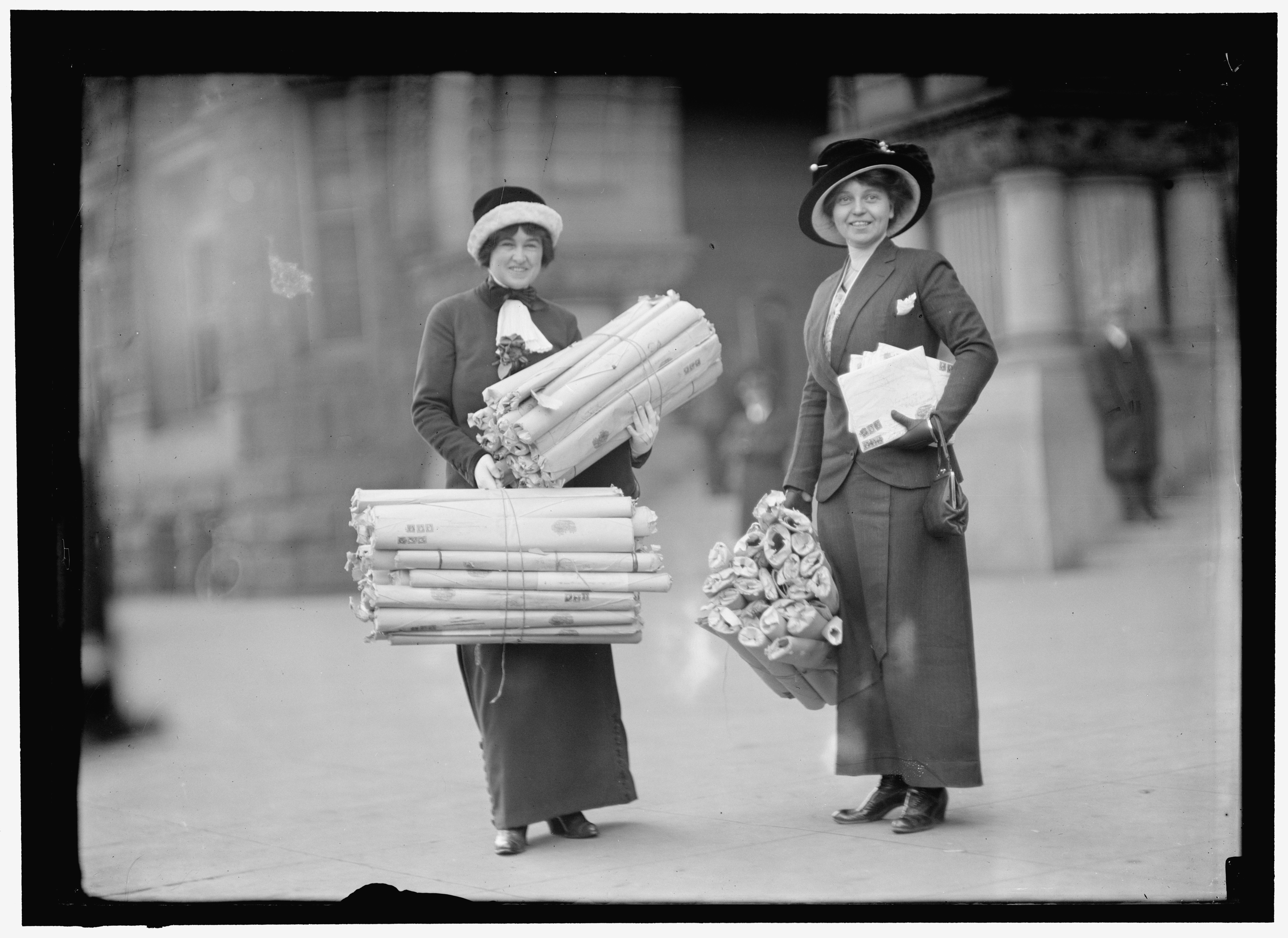
Maud Littleton gatherings petitions to have Monticello expropriated from Jefferson Monroe Levy, 1912.

In 1909, Maud Littleton, the wife of Martin W. Littleton, visited Monticello, which was then owned by the politician Jefferson Monroe Levy. Following her visit, Littleton launched a nationwide antisemitic campaign to have Monticello expropriated from Jefferson Levy. Littleton took her campaign to the press as well as to Congress, with two bills to expropriate Monticello from Levy failing to pass. Littleton used veiled antisemitic remarks to disparage Levy, such as calling him an "alien", "oriental", and a "rank outsider" who had allegedly altered the character of "the house that Jefferson built and made sacred." Littleton also made attempts to purchase Monticello. Angered by Littleton's antisemitism, Levy refused to sell his property. However, due to strained finances, Levy reluctantly sold Monticello to a foundation. Maud Littleton became the organization's first executive director. For the next 60 years, mention of the Levy family was erased by the foundation, despite the fact that Levy's mother Rachel is buried at Monticello. Neglected for decades, Rachel's grave was refurbished in 1985, under the foundation's new executive director Daniel Jordan.

==== Residential segregation ====
Prior to the passage of the 1968 Fair Housing Act, many neighborhoods throughout Virginia used restrictive covenants to exclude African Americans, and less commonly non-Black people of color and Jews. In the city of Alexandria during the 1940s, the neighborhoods of Rosemont and Temple Park used restrictive covenants to exclude any person of the "Hebrew or Jewish Race", as well as African Americans and Asian Americans.

During the 1920s and 1930s, certain neighborhoods of the city of Danville used restrictive covenants to exclude Jews as well as Greeks and Syrians. The Beaverstone Park neighborhood of Danville, founded after World War II, also excluded Jews.

==== Antisemitic quotas ====
During the early 20th century, the University of Virginia used antisemitic quotas to reduce the number of Jewish students at the university. A 1927 Report of the Dean of the college "the University will have to set some limit to the number of Jews to be admitted, giving preference of course to those who are citizens of Virginia." The preference for Virginian Jews was to discourage New York Jews from attending the university.

=== 21st century ===
The Southern Poverty Law Center lists several antisemitic hate groups that operate in Virginia, including the League of the South and the Patriot Front.

The Anti-Defamation League has reported an increase in antisemitic instances of harassment, violence, and vandalism during the 2010s and 2020s. In 2022, there were 69 reported antisemitic incidents.

== See also ==
- Antisemitism in Connecticut
- Antisemitism in Florida
- Antisemitism in Maryland
- Antisemitism in New Jersey
- Antisemitism in Washington, D.C.
- Antisemitism in the United States
- History of antisemitism in the United States
