= Antisemitism in New Jersey =

The history of Antisemitism in New Jersey dates to the establishment of the Province of New Jersey. Prior to the passage of the 1968 Fair Housing Act, Jewish people were excluded from living in many white Christian neighborhoods throughout New Jersey due to the use of restrictive covenants and quotas. Between the 1920s and 1950s, quota systems were instituted at universities in New Jersey to limit the number of Jewish people, including at Rutgers University and Princeton University. During the 2010s and 2020s, New Jersey has seen an increase in reported incidents of antisemitic vandalism and violence.

== History ==
=== 17th century ===
The Province of New Jersey granted religious tolerance under law in 1665.

=== 19th century ===
In 1844, the Constitution of New Jersey abolished all religious tests for holding public office and voting.

=== 20th century ===
==== Residential segregation ====
In 1956, the Anti-Defamation League issued a "call to action" to end ethnic and religious discrimination in real estate that excluded Jews as well as Catholics of Irish and Italian descent from owning houses in white Protestant neighborhoods.

In March, 1967, the Appellate Division of the New Jersey State Superior Court ruled that a country club in Wayne Township was violating the law by using restrictive covenants to exclude Jews and African-Americans.

==== Antisemitic quotas ====
In 1924, Princeton University had an "under the table" Jewish quota that limited Jewish admission to around 3%.

In October 1930, Jewish students called attention to a numerus clausus at Rutgers University that limited the number of Jews. Only 33 Jewish students were admitted to the Rutgers freshman class of that year. The New Jersey branches of B’nai Brith, the Independent Order Brith Sholom, and the Order Sons of Zion, announced an investigation.

=== 21st century ===
In 2017 and 2018, there was a controversy over the construction of an eruv in Bergen County, when several municipalities opposed its construction. Supporters of the eruv alleged antisemitic discrimination and a lawsuits were settled in favor of the eruv association.

In 2019, a shooting occurred at a kosher supermarket in Jersey City. New Jersey authorities have described the attack as domestic terrorism motivated by antisemitism.

In 2023, a state lawsuit against Jackson Township was settled alleging discrimination against Orthodox Jews. The township was ordered to pay $575,000 for allegedly using local ordinances to keep out Orthodox Jewish residents.

== See also ==
- Antisemitism in Connecticut
- Antisemitism in Florida
- Antisemitism in Maryland
- Antisemitism in Virginia
- Antisemitism in the United States
- History of antisemitism in the United States
- History of the Jews in New Jersey
- History of the Ku Klux Klan in New Jersey
