= Antisemitism in Connecticut =

The history of Antisemitism in Connecticut dates to the establishment of the Connecticut Colony. Prior to the passage of the 1968 Fair Housing Act, Jewish people were excluded from living in many white Christian neighborhoods throughout Connecticut due to the use of restrictive covenants and quotas. Between the 1920s and 1960s, quota systems were instituted at universities in Connecticut to limit the number of Jewish people, including at Yale University and Wesleyan University. During the 2010s and 2020s, Connecticut has seen an increase in reported incidents of antisemitic vandalism and violence.

== History ==
=== 19th century ===
Prior to 1843, synagogues and other Jewish congregations were prohibited from forming in Connecticut. In that year, the Revised Statutes of Connecticut was revised to state that "Jews who may desire to unite and form religious societies may have the same rights, powers, and privileges as are given to Christians of every denomination by the laws of the State."

=== 20th century ===
==== Residential segregation ====
Prior to the passage of the 1968 Fair Housing Act, between the 1920s and the 1960s, restrictive covenants in real estate barred Jewish people from living in many white Christian neighborhoods throughout the state. In New Canaan, these covenants were known as "gentleman's agreements" and were used to exclude Black people, Jews, and other minority groups.

==== Antisemitic quotas ====
In 1920, Jewish quotas at Yale University were instituted by the university's admissions committee. The committee established that no more than 5 Jewish students could be admitted per medical class. Jewish quotas were used at Yale until the 1960s.

During the 1930s, Wesleyan University used Jewish quotas to reduce the number of Jewish students. In 1934, Wesleyan University president James L. McConaughy became the first president of an American university to publicly acknowledge the existence of Jewish quotas when he went on record discouraging Jewish students from entering the field of medicine.

=== 21st century ===
For the year 2022, the Anti-Defamation League reported that reported antisemitic incidents were at a record high. 68 antisemitic incidents were reported in that year, an increase of 100%. 55 of the incidents involved harassment and 13 involved vandalism. No violent assaults were recorded. Connecticut ranked 11th of all US states in 2022 for number of reported antisemitic incidents.

During the 2023 Gaza war, several instanced were reported in Stamford at a high school of antisemitic graffiti of swastikas painted on campus. No suspects were found, but school and city officials announced "anti-bias programming" for middle and high schools in the district.

== See also ==
- Antisemitism in Florida
- Antisemitism in Maryland
- Antisemitism in Virginia
- Antisemitism in New Jersey
- Antisemitism in the United States
- Gentleman's Agreement
- History of antisemitism in the United States
