= Asian quota =

Type of racial quota

Asian enrollment at Ivy League schools, 1980–2011

Asian enrollment at non-Ivy League schools, 1980–2011

An Asian quota is a racial quota limiting the number of people of Asian descent in an establishment, a special case of numerus clausus. It usually refers to alleged educational quotas in United States higher education admissions, specifically by Ivy League universities against Asian Americans, especially persons of East Asian and South Asian descent starting in the late 1980s. These allegations of discrimination have been denied by U.S. universities. Asian quotas have been compared to earlier claims of Jewish quotas, which are believed to have limited the admissions of a model minority from the 1910s to the 1950s. Jewish quotas were denied at the time, but their existence is rarely disputed now. Some have thus called Asian-Americans "The New Jews" of university admissions.

Proponents of Asian quotas' existence believe that by various measures admissions have a bias against Asian applicants, though not necessarily a strict quota: for example, successful Asian applicants have on average higher test scores than the overall average. The bias against applicants of Asian descent has been termed a "bamboo ceiling" or "Asian penalty". Alleged Asian quotas have been the subject of government investigations and lawsuits, with some minor conclusions of their existence, though no major judgements, as of 2017.

== Debate ==
Ivy League universities deny that there is an Asian quota. Due to the sensitivity of college admissions and racial preferences generally, and legal concerns (government investigations, court decisions, and ongoing or future litigation), official statements are largely blanket denials, and a defense of holistic admission, rather than specific answers to charges. Some historians and former admissions officers likewise deny that there is an Asian quota or a bias against Asian applicants, or conclude as much.

More generally, the bias in test scores (the fact that successful Asian applicants have higher test scores than successful applicants overall) is ascribed to applicants being judged on more than test scores. Stated formally, rather than higher test scores among successful Asian applicants meaning that an individual Asian applicant must meet a higher bar than an otherwise identical non-Asian applicant, it may simply be a reflection that Asians have relatively higher test scores: compared to the overall applicant pool, Asians have higher test scores, and a borderline Asian applicant will have higher test scores, but be lower on all other non-academic measures, than the average borderline applicant.

== Legal aspects ==
Racial quotas are illegal in United States college admissions, but it was decided in Regents of the University of California v. Bakke (1978) and re-affirmed in Fisher v. University of Texas (2013) that race can be used as a factor in admissions decisions (affirmative action).

Lawsuits have been filed on this basis. Specifically, Harvard University was sued in 2018 for allegedly downgrading Asian-Americans' application scores in order to reduce amount of admission. The United States Justice Department later stated that Harvard did not demonstrate that they did not discriminate during admissions based on race. On June 29, 2023, the Supreme Court ruled in Students for Fair Admissions v. President and Fellows of Harvard College (2023) that the race-based admissions program adopted by Harvard violates the Equal Protection Clause of the Fourteenth Amendment.

== See also ==
- Racial quota
- Affirmative action
- Jewish quota
