= Friendship Park =

Friendship Park may refer to:

- Friendship Park (Bloomingdale, New Jersey)
- Friendship Park (Lima)
- Friendship Park (Ohio)
- Friendship Park (San Diego–Tijuana)
- Friendship "Turtle" Park, Washington, DC
- Sheger Park
