= American University Park =

- Neighborhood
- Map of Washington, D.C., with American University Park highlighted in red
- Coordinates: 38.95°N 77.09°W
- Country: United States
- District: Washington, D.C.
- Ward: Ward 3

Government
  - Councilmember: Matthew Frumin
- Postal code: ZIP code

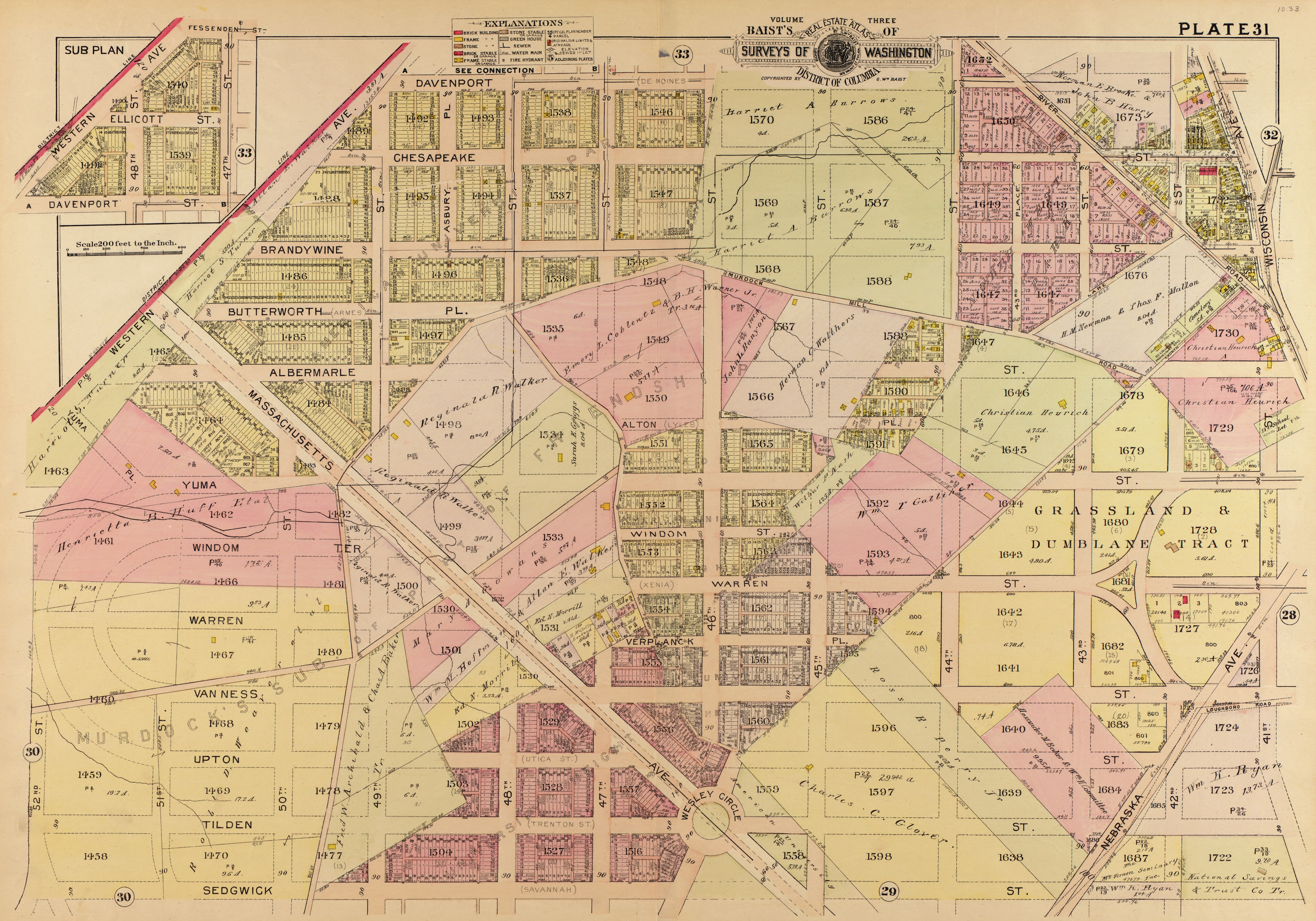
1919 map of American University Park.

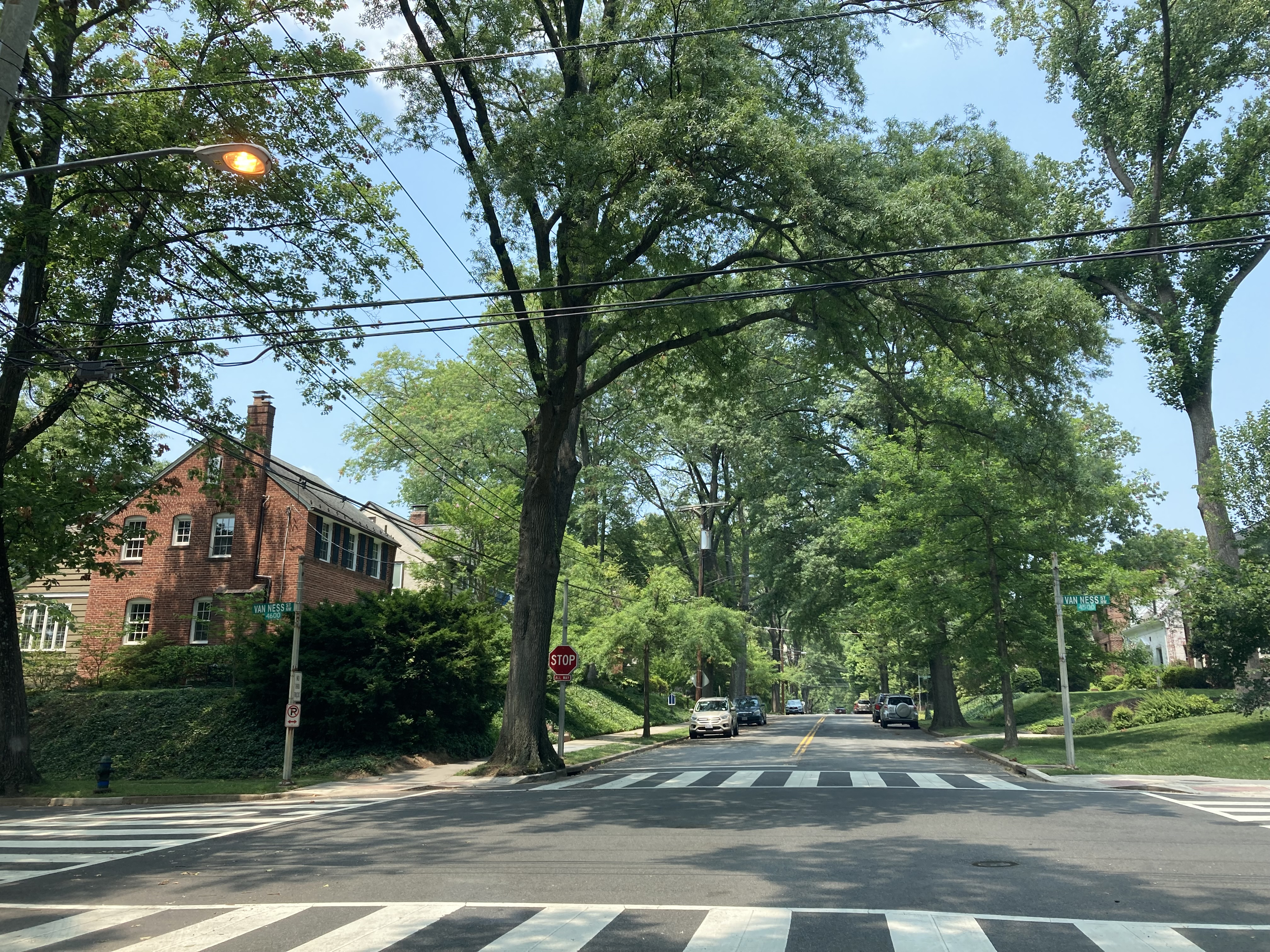
Intersection of Van Ness Ave. and 46th St. NW, July 2021, in American University Park

American University Park is a neighborhood of Washington, D.C., named for American University. AU Park, as it is often abbreviated, is situated against the Maryland border in the Northwest quadrant, bounded by Massachusetts, Wisconsin, Nebraska, and Western Avenues. Tenleytown and Friendship Heights lie to the east, Embassy Row to the southeast, and Spring Valley to the southwest. Politically, it is part of Ward 3 and Advisory Neighborhood Commission 3E.

This neighborhood includes some of the highest elevations in the city and is close to the District's highest point in neighboring Tenleytown at 429 ft (131 m) (the city's lowest point is sea level, on the banks of the Potomac River).

Developed in the 1920s by the W.C. and A.N. Miller, which also developed Spring Valley and Wesley Heights, the neighborhood consists almost entirely of single-family homes. A wide variety of architectural styles are present, and most homes have been modified or expanded since the 1930s. Although one of Washington's first tracts developed with the automobile in mind, the approximately 2,700 homes are closely spaced, feature porches or stoops, and often lack driveways, which boosters say contributes to community spirit.

W.C. and A.N. Miller established restrictive covenants on the development to prevent Jewish or African-Americans from purchasing homes, which remained in place for decades. Then-Senator Richard Nixon and his wife Pat Nixon signed one in 1951 for their $41,000 home at 4801 Tilden St., also signed by Edward J. Miller, president of WC and AN Miller Company.

The following is an excerpt from the restrictive covenant:

"NO PART OF LAND HEREBY CONVEYED SHALL EVER BE USED, OR OCCUPIED BY, OR SOLD, DEMISED, TRANSFERRED, CONVEYED UNTO, OR IN TRUST FOR, LEASED, OR PERSONS OF NEGRO BLOOD OR EXTRACTION, OR TO ANY RENTED OR GIVEN TO NEGRO PEOPLE OR ANY PERSON OR PERSON OF THE SEMITIC RACE, BLOOD, OR ORIGIN WHICH RACIAL DESCRIPTION SHALL BE DEEMED TO INCLUDE ARMENIANS, JEWS, HEBREWS, PERSIANS, OR SYRIANS, EXCEPT THAT, THIS PARAGRAPH SHALL NOT BE HELD TO EXCLUDE PARTIAL OCCUPANCY OF THE PREMISES BY DOMESTIC SERVANTS OF SAID PARITIES HERETO OF THE SECOND PART THEIR HEIRS OR ASSIGNS."

Friendship Park, often called Turtle Park, serves as a center for community activity. Neighborhood landmarks include American University's Washington College of Law and Katzen Arts Center, the Georgetown Day School, Bernard T. Janney Elementary School, the residence of the Japanese ambassador, and the former embassy of Sweden (which was relocated to the Georgetown waterfront in October 2006), and it was long popular among the diplomatic community. Affordable housing drew young families to American University Park starting in the early 1990s. It remains highly desirable — real estate values have more than doubled since then. Average homes are now valued well over $1 million.
