= Wesley Heights =

Neighborhood in Washington, D.C.

- Neighborhood of Washington, D.C.
- Map of Washington, D.C., with Wesley Heights highlighted in red
- Coordinates: 38.928978°N 77.089542°W
- Country: United States
- District: Washington, D.C.
- Ward: Ward 3

Government
  - Councilmember: Matthew Frumin
- Postal code: ZIP code

Wesley Heights is a small affluent neighborhood of Washington, D.C. situated south of Spring Valley. Wesley Heights was founded in 1890 by a land speculation group led by John Waggaman and funded primarily by Charles C. Glover; Wesley Heights was further developed by the brothers William C. and Allison N. Miller during the 1920s. Modern-day Wesley Heights is bordered by Massachusetts Avenue (on the east), Nebraska Avenue (on the north), Battery-Kemble Park (on the west) and Glover Parkway (on the south). Foxhall Road and New Mexico Avenue are the main roadways passing through Wesley Heights. To protect the character of the original historic housing design of Wesley Heights, the Wesley Heights Zoning Overlay was developed and approved by District of Columbia Zoning Commission on July 13, 1992, at the urging of the Wesley Heights Historical Society. Current homeowners and new housing development within the Wesley Heights overlay must meet specific building codes. The Wesley overlay covers areas west of New Mexico Avenue (on the East), Nebraska Avenue (on the North), Battery-Kemble Park (on the West) and Glover Parkway (on the South). The overlay restriction does not cover development on housing located on the former Charles C. Glover country estate. Modern day Wesley Heights is located in Ward 3 Advisory Neighborhood Commission under 3D01.

== History ==
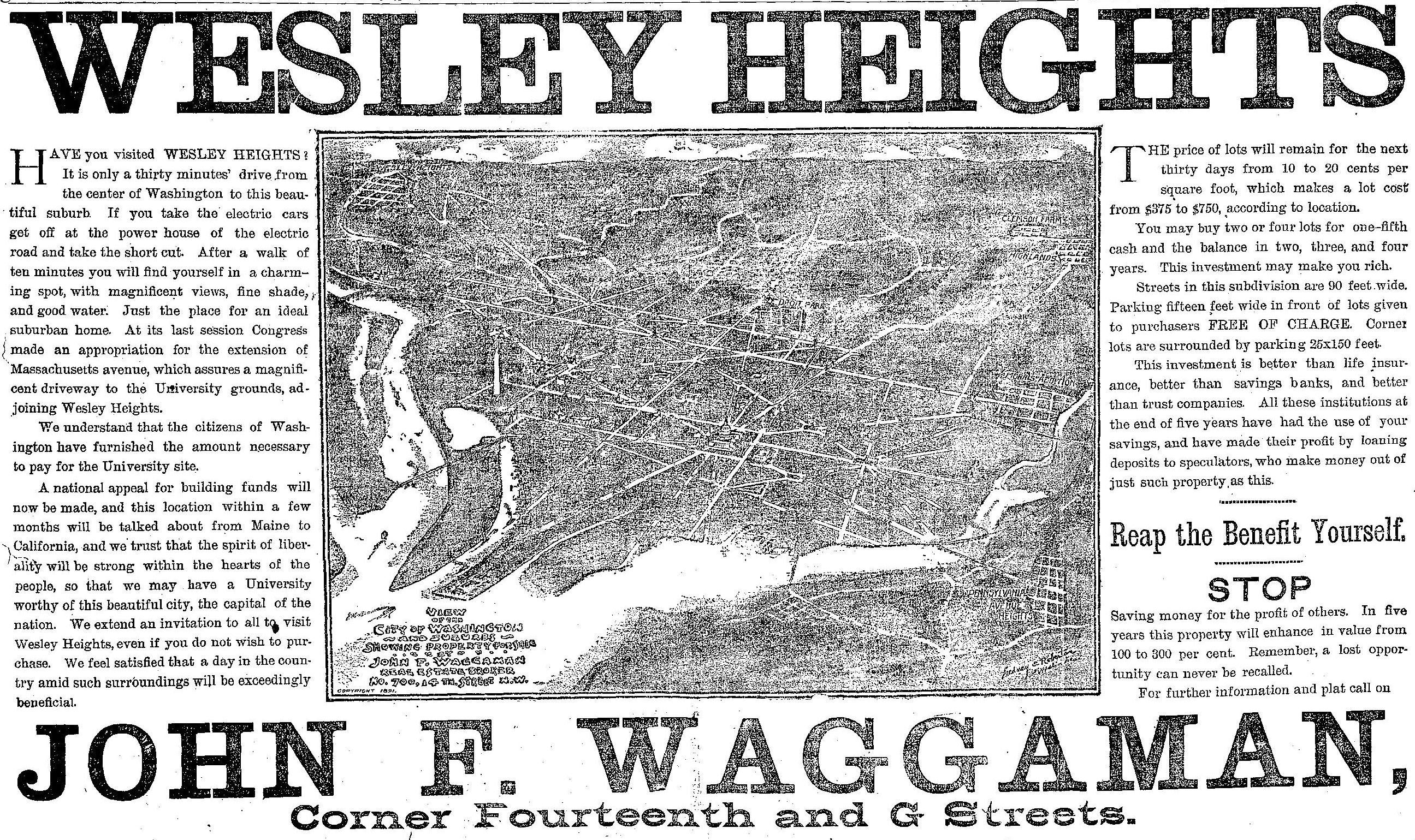
Wesley Heights advert in The Washington Post in 1891

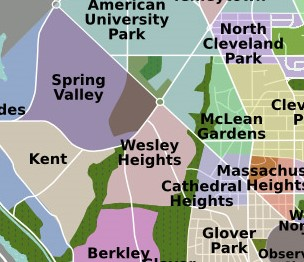
Wesley Heights' current boundaries in the District of Columbia Ward 3

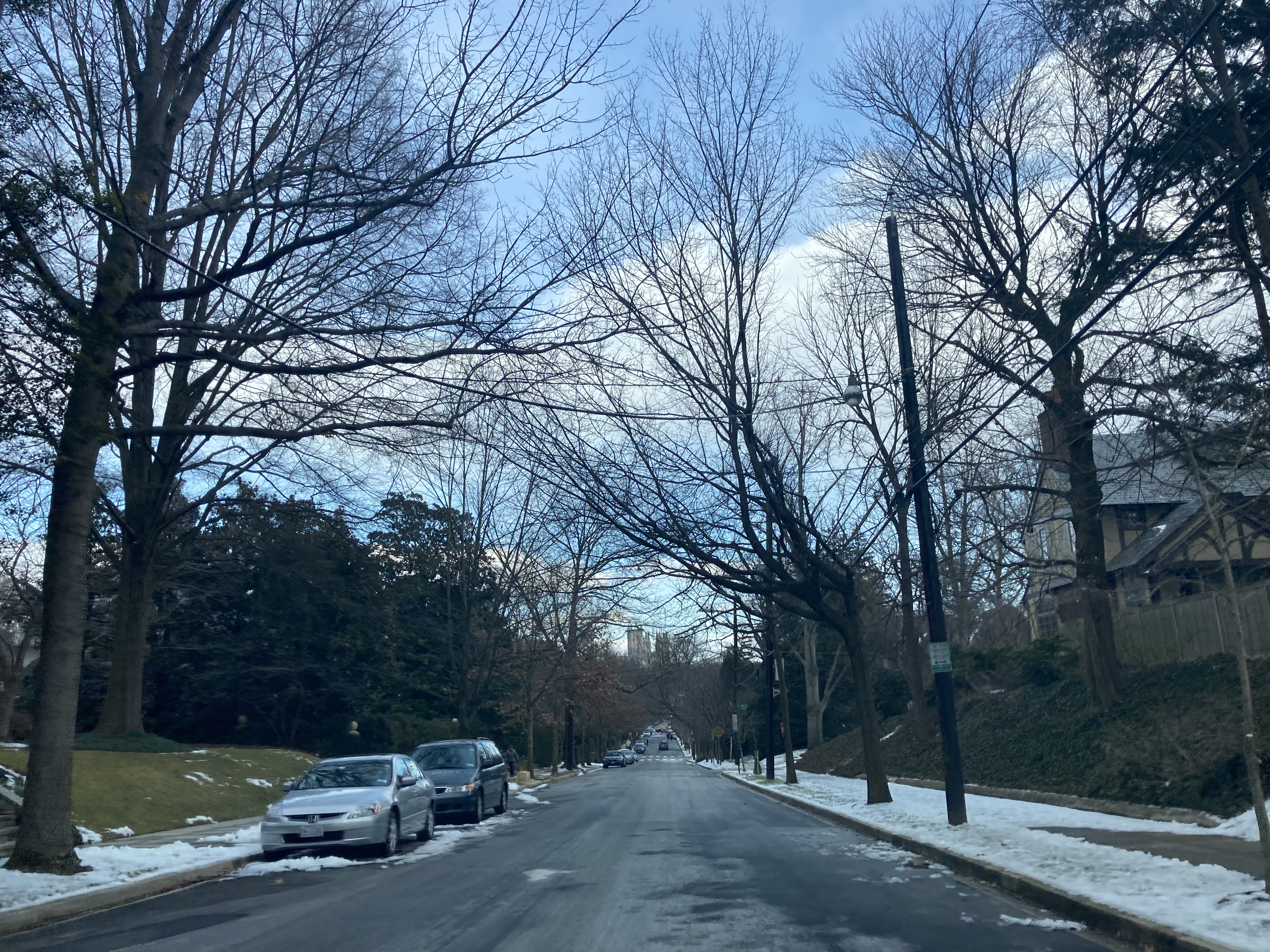
Intersection of Cathedral Ave. and 45th St. NW in February 2021

The area which became Wesley Heights was part of a tract of land owned by John Threlkeld (a resident of Georgetown). The tract of land was called Alliance. In 1890, a group of investors fronted by John Waggaman (a real estate broker) and bankrolled by Charles. C. Glover bought all the land between Chain Bridge Road to the east, Newark Street to the North, 43rd Street (which then ran parallel to 44th street past Newark Street), and Fulton Street to the south. Tunlaw Street (Now New Mexico Avenue) ran perpendicular between 44th street and 43rd street. The group named the new development Wesley Heights to appeal to Methodist buyers. John Waggaman and Charles C. Glover played instrumental roles in the selection and purchase of the site of the soon to be Methodist-affiliated American University just north of Newark Street.

The newly named Wesley Height development was divided into plots and some of the plots were sold to prospective home buyers and investors. In 1892, Charles C. Glover acquired all the Wesley Heights plots (block 29, 22 and 21) between New Mexico Street and the then 43rd Street, and built his country mansion named Westover. By 1908, John Waggaman estate had filed for bankruptcy and Charles Glover was summoned to court to give testimony; the vast majority of Wesley Heights had been mortgaged to the hilt and there was suspicion that John Waggaman and Charles Glover had benefited from nefarious activities pertaining to the financing and acquisition of Wesley Heights and other large land developments in Washington, D.C. For years after the bankruptcy, Wesley Heights was neglected, and was mostly occupied by Charles Glover's grand estate, Westover, and a few homes that were developed by John Waggaman.

In 1897, led by Charles Glover, the owners of Wesley Heights offered to sell a large section of Wesley Height (land adjunct to Nebraska Avenue and Loughboro Road) to American University. The university declined the offer.

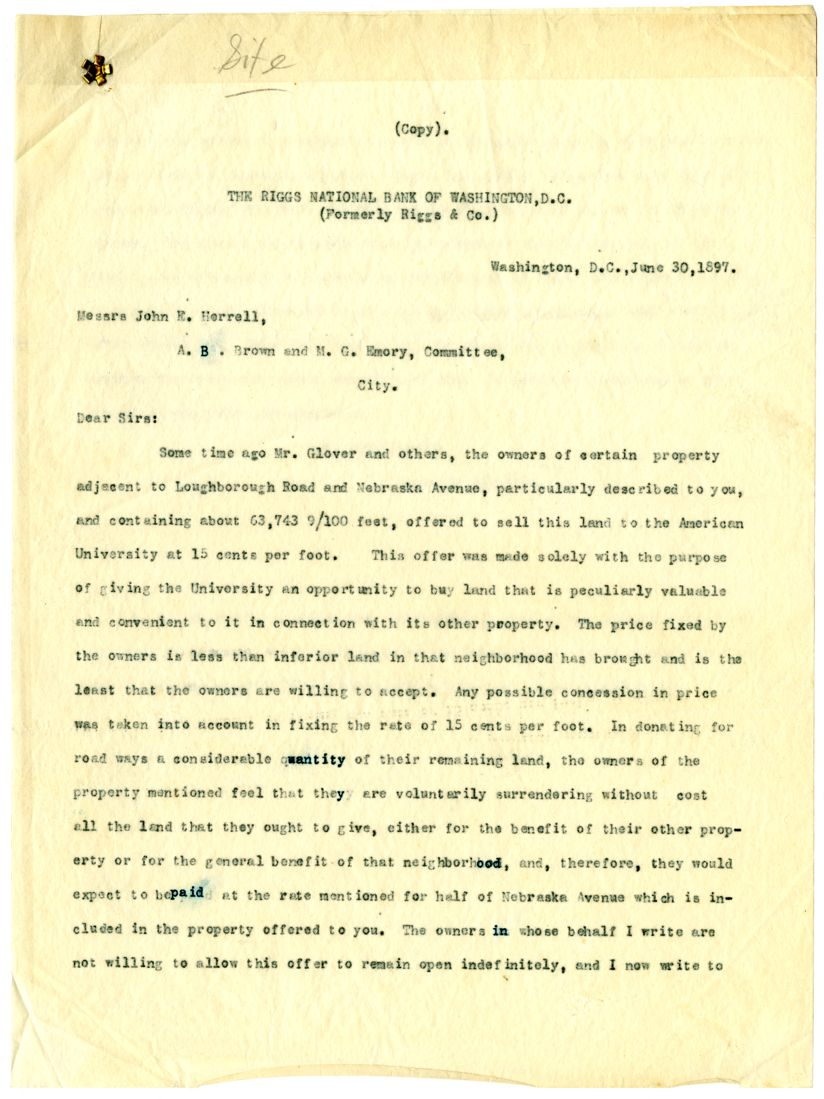
Charles Glover offer letter to sell portion of Wesley Heights land to American University

During the 1920s, a revitalization effort was initiated by real estate developers W.C. and A.N. Miller with the purchasing of plots (80 acres) in Wesley Heights. W.C. and A.N. Miller began constructing homes in Wesley Heights, and also in the neighboring communities of Spring Valley and American University Park. W.C. and A.N. Miller planned development in Wesley Heights was one of the first master-planned communities in the United States and featured such services as a shuttle to the Wisconsin Avenue streetcar and a community club house.

Prior to the passage of the 1968 Fair Housing Act, religious and racial covenants were enforced for property deeds for houses in Wesley Heights that excluded African-Americans, Jews, and members other minority groups. One deed from December 1928 stated that properties in Wesley Heights "shall not be sold to any person of the Semitic race, blood or origin which racial description can be deemed to include Jews, Hebrews, Armenians, Persians and Syrians."

== Wesley Heights' Geography before the 1920 revitalization ==
Not much is known about the geography of Wesley Heights before W.C. and A.N. Miller began building houses on Wesley Heights. Nevertheless, in 1894 Kate Field, the renowned American journalist, notes in her published periodical journal (Kate Field's Washington), a vivid description of Wesley Heights from a viewpoint on Charles Glover's estate. According to Kate Field:

"Whoever stands on the broad piazza of Mr. and Mrs. C.C Glover's country home, "Westover", on Wesley Heights, has a view that vividly recalls the neighborhood of Richmond, England. Never was the scene more attractive than one day last week when Mr. Glover received several hundred friends. Four hundred feet above sea level, "Westover" commands the Blue Ridge on one side and the winding Potomac on the other. The tip of the monument is visible from the ground, while the Capitol may be seen from the top of the house. Truly a beautiful situation with a perennial breeze untainted by malaria".

== Sources ==
- Shaw, Diane (2010). ""Wesley Heights and Spring Valley: Persistency and Consistency"". In Katharine Smith (ed.). Washington At Home. Baltimore: Johns Hopkins University Press. pp. 415–432, 492–493.
