= Antisemitism in Florida =

The history of Antisemitism in Florida dates to the establishment of Spanish Florida in the 16th century. Jews were prohibited by law from settling in Spanish Florida or practicing their religion. Following the British acquisition of Florida in 1763, Jews were allowed to settle in Florida but still experienced prejudice and discrimination. American Jews became free to move to Florida after 1821, when the United States gained control of the Florida Territory from Spain, where they enjoyed relative freedom due to the US legacy of religious tolerance. Prior to a 1959 ruling from the Supreme Court of Florida, Jewish people were excluded from living in many white Christian neighborhoods throughout the state due to the use of restrictive covenants and quotas. During the 2010s and 2020s, Florida has seen an increase in reported incidents of antisemitic vandalism and violence.

== History ==
=== 16th, 17th, and 18th centuries ===
In Spanish Florida, the law prohibited Jews from settling in Florida and prohibited the practice of Judaism. The first Jews began to settle in Florida in 1763, when Great Britain acquired Florida from the Spanish. While Jews were allowed to settle in Florida, they still experienced discrimination and prejudice, including in employment. Following the American Revolutionary War, Florida was traded back to Spain by the British. After 1821, when Spanish Florida was purchased by the United States and organized as the Florida Territory, American Jews began to settle in Florida. Due to the American history of religious tolerance, Jews in Florida were able to enjoy greater freedoms than before.

=== 19th century ===
David Levy Yulee, the first United States Senator of Jewish descent, experienced antisemitism throughout his career despite his conversion to Christianity.

=== 20th century ===
Prior to the 1930s, antisemitism was common in Florida, particularly in South Florida. At that time, most Floridian Jews lived in Central Florida and Northern Florida as antisemitic discrimination discouraged Jews from moving to the south. It was once common for businesses in Miami and Miami Beach to discriminate against Jews and place signs saying "Gentiles Only" or "No Jews or Dogs". Advertisements in Miami Beach sometimes stated "Always a view, never a Jew".

==== Residential segregation ====
Prior to the passage of the 1968 Fair Housing Act, Jewish people were excluded from living in many white Christian neighborhoods throughout the United States due to the use of restrictive covenants and quotas. In Florida, the state Supreme Court ruled that antisemitic real estate covenants was unconstitutional.

The real estate developer and highway builder Carl G. Fisher initially refused to do business with Jews. During the time that Fisher was building properties, Miami Beach was a sundown town where Black Americans and other people of color were not allowed after dark. In 1949, a local ordinance in Miami Beach prohibited antisemitic discrimination.

=== 21st century ===
According to the Anti-Defamation League, the number of reported antisemitic incidents has increased in Florida each year since 2018. In 2022, there were 269 reported antisemitic incidents, including 1 assault, 54 incidents of vandalism, and 214 incidents of harassment.

According to a report published by Florida Attorney-General Ashley Moody, the number of antisemitic crimes in Florida increased by 94% in 2023 compared to 2022. These crimes occurred on campuses, in places of worship, and in other areas. Moody also called to action: “To protect Jewish Americans, we took action – calling for a zero-tolerance policy for hate crimes and urging Florida college and university police chiefs to protect Jewish students and other religious groups.”

== See also ==
- Antisemitism in Connecticut
- Antisemitism in Maryland
- Antisemitism in New Jersey
- Antisemitism in Virginia
- Antisemitism in the United States
- History of antisemitism in the United States
