= Racial quota =

Numerical requirements for hiring members of a particular racial group

Racial quotas in employment and education are numerical requirements or quotas for hiring, promoting, admitting or graduating members of a particular racial group. Racial quotas are often established as means of diminishing racial discrimination, addressing under-representation and evident racism against those racial groups or, the opposite, against the disadvantaged majority group (see numerus clausus or bhumiputra systems). Conversely, quotas have also been used historically to promote discrimination against minority groups by limiting access to influential institutions in employment and education.

These quotas may be determined by governmental authority and backed by governmental sanctions. When the total number of jobs or enrolment slots is fixed, this proportion may get translated to a specific number.

== Regions and nations ==
=== Ancient Mongolia ===
The Mongols divided different races into a four-class system during the Yuan dynasty.

The Mongol Emperor Kublai Khan had introduced a hierarchy of reliability by dividing the population of the Yuan dynasty into the following classes:

- Mongols introduced it to China which was at time ruled by the Mongol Empire
- Semuren, immigrants from the west and some clans of Central Asia (Muslims, Christians, Jews, Buddhists)
- North Chinese, Kitans, Jurchens and Koreans

=== Ancient China ===
Several laws enforcing racial segregation of foreigners were passed during the Tang dynasty. In 779 AD, the Tang dynasty issued an edict which forced Uighurs to wear their ethnic dress, and restricted them from marrying Chinese.

In 836 AD, Lu Chun was appointed as governor of Canton. He was disgusted to find Chinese living with foreigners and intermarriage. Lu enforced separation, banning interracial marriages, and prevented foreigners from owning properties. The 836 law specifically banned Chinese from forming relationships with "Dark peoples" or "People of colour", terms referring to foreigners, such as "Iranians, Sogdians, Arabs, Indians, Malays, Sumatrans", etc.

=== Brazil ===
Activism for access to education for the Black population in the country intensified in the 1990s, resulting in several affirmative action policies, including racial quotas.

In November 2001, the state of Rio de Janeiro approved State Law No. 3,708, reserving a minimum of 40% of places in undergraduate courses at the Rio de Janeiro State University and the State University of Northern Rio de Janeiro for people who self-identify as Black or Pardos, in addition to the 50% quota established for students from public schools, adopted a year earlier. The system was later reorganised in 2003 with State Law No. 4,151, which established a specific quota of 20% for Black people, and also added places for people with disabilities and members of ethnic minorities.

The first proposal to implement a racial quota system in a federal institution in Brazil was presented on 17 November 1999, during Black Awareness Week, at the Central Library of the University of Brasília by Rita Segato and José Jorge de Carvalho. It was approved in 2003 and implemented in 2004.

On 10 December 2025, the Legislative Assembly of Santa Catarina approved Bill 753, to prohibit racial quotas in state institutions, such as universities. The Minister for Racial Equality, Anielle Franco, expressed her disapproval of the approval of the bill. On 22 January 2026, the state governor, Jorginho Mello (PL), signed the bill into law.

On 26 January 2026, the Socialism and Liberty Party, the National Union of Students, and Educafro filed a direct action of unconstitutionality (ADI) with the Supreme Federal Court against the law. On the same day, Justice Gilmar Mendes ordered the state government and the Legislative Assembly to provide explanations regarding the law.

On 27 January, Appellate Judge Maria do Rocio Luz Santa Ritta, of the Court of Justice of Santa Catarina, issued a preliminary injunction suspending the state law.

On the 29th, the state government responded to the Mendes' request, claiming that the law was not discriminatory and that the state had the largest white population in Brazil.

On 17 April, the Supreme Federal Court voted unanimously to overturn the state law.

=== France ===
By 1935, the French government enacted a series of racial quotas on certain professions.

=== Germany ===
See Nazi boycott of Jewish businesses.

=== Malaysia ===
See Bumiputera (Malaysia).

=== United States ===
The National Origins Formula was an American system of immigration quotas, between 1921 and 1965, which restricted immigration on the basis of existing proportions of the population. The goal was to maintain the existing ethnic composition of the United States. It had the effect of giving low quotas to Eastern and Southern Europe.

Such racial quotas were restored after the Civil Rights Act of 1964, especially during the 1970s. Richard Nixon's Labor Secretary George P. Shultz demanded that anti-black construction unions allow a certain number of black people into the unions. The Department of Labor began enforcing these quotas across the country. After a US Supreme Court case, Griggs v. Duke Power Company, found that neutral application tests and procedures that still resulted in de facto segregation of employees (if previous discrimination had existed) were illegal, more companies began implementing quotas on their own.

In a 1973 court case, a federal judge created one of the first mandated quotas when he ruled that half of the Bridgeport, Connecticut Police Department's new employees must be either black or Puerto Rican. In 1974, the Department of Justice and the United Steelworkers of America came to an agreement on the largest-to-then quota program, for steel unions.

In 1978, the US Supreme Court ruled in Regents of the University of California v. Bakke that public universities (and other government institutions) could not set specific numerical targets based on race for admissions or employment. The Court said that "goals" and "timetables" for diversity could be set instead. A 1979 Supreme Court case, United Steelworkers v. Weber, found that private employers could set rigid numerical quotas, if they chose to do so. In 1980, the Supreme Court found that a 10% racial quota for federal contractors was permitted.

In 1990 City University of New York was accused of discriminatory hiring practices against Italian-Americans.

In 1991, President George H. W. Bush made an attempt to abolish affirmative action altogether, maintaining that "any regulation, rule, enforcement practice or other aspect of these programs that mandates, encourages, or otherwise involves the use of quotas, preferences, set-asides or other devices on the basis of race, sex, religion or national origin are to be terminated as soon as is legally feasible". This claim led up to the creation of the Civil Rights Act of 1991; however, the document was not able to implement these changes. It only covered the terms for settling cases where discrimination has been confirmed to have occurred.

=== South Africa ===
Local trade unions commonly use the term "Absolute representation" in this regard.

- BEE (Black Economic Empowerment) – Companies are scored based on the quota of black ownership, senior managers, training, as well as suppliers. These scores then translate into their ability to compete for government tenders.
- Affirmative Action – The SAPS (South African Police Service) operates a quota system policy for hiring and promotion. Positions will be left unfilled if the appropriate demographic candidate cannot be recruited, even if another qualified person is available.
- University Enrolment – First year students are registered on a racial quota basis. In some cases there are different admission requirements for different demographics. For example: to study medicine at the University of Cape Town (UCT), white and Indian students require at least a 78% average on their National Senior Certificate, whereas black students only requires 59%. This is largely as a result of the quota system requiring privileged access for certain ethnic groups – In 2016 the University of KwaZulu-Natal quota for medical students is 69% black African, 19% Indian, 9% coloured, 2% white and 1% other.
- Sport – Sports Minister Fikile Mbalula has imposed quota systems in athletics, cricket, football, netball and rugby.

== Opposition ==
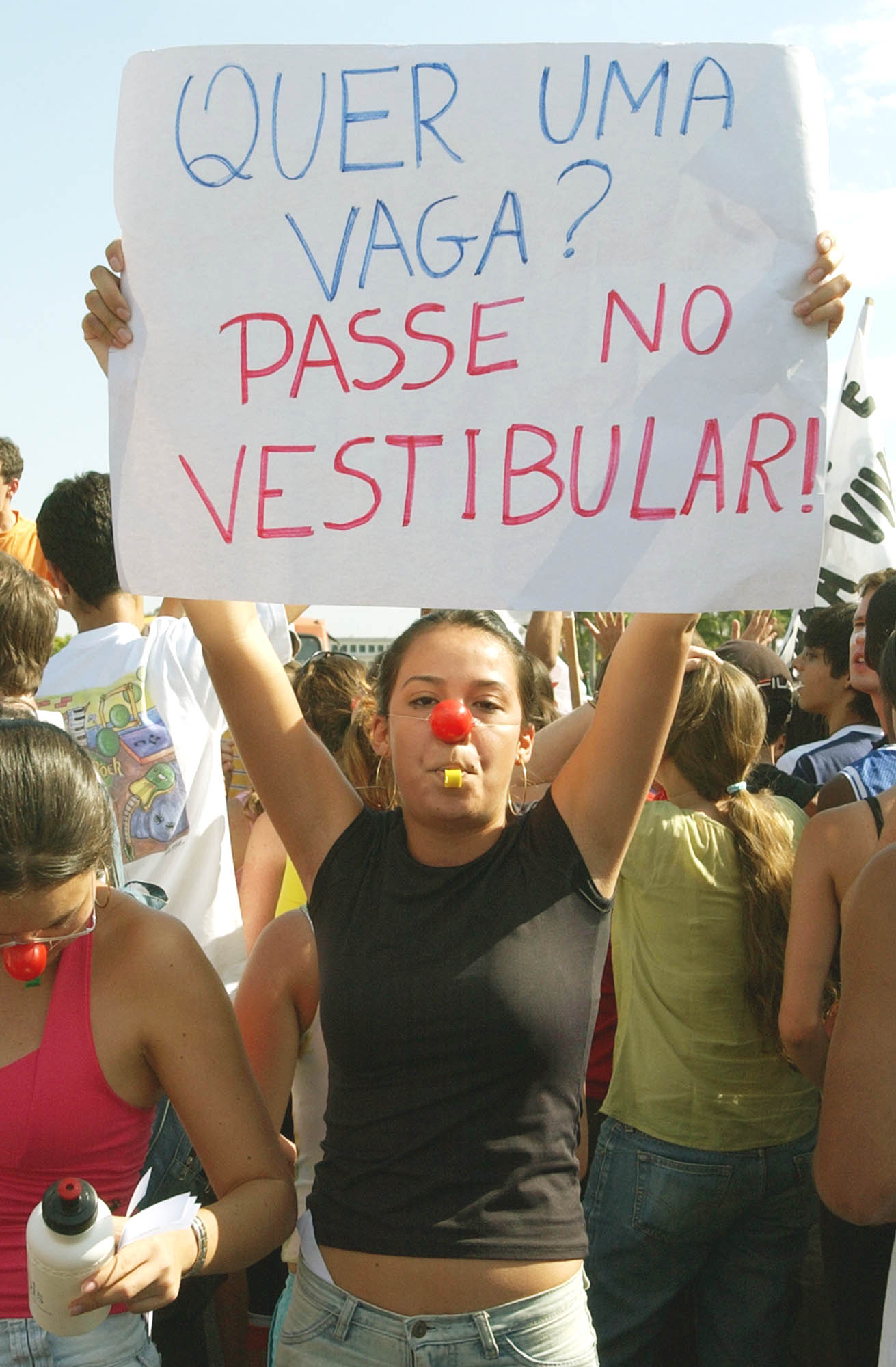
Students protesting against racial quotas in Brasília, Brazil. The sign reads: "Want an opening? Pass the Vestibular (entry exam)!"

Opponents of quotas object that one group is favoured at the expense of another whenever a quota is invoked rather than factors such as grade point averages or test scores. They argue that using quotas displaces individuals that would normally be favoured based on their individual achievements. Opponents of racial quotas believe that qualifications should be the only determining factor when competing for a job or admission to a school. It is argued this causes "reverse discrimination" where individuals in the majority to lose out to a minority.

== Examples ==
Some affirmative action programs openly involve quotas such as the admission program of the Universidade Federal do Rio Grande do Sul. (See also: Vestibular exam § Racial quotas.)

The law student organisation Building a Better Legal Profession developed a method to encourage politically liberal students to avoid law firms whose racial makeup is markedly different from that of the population as a whole. In an October 2007 press conference reported in The Wall Street Journal, and The New York Times, the group released data publicising the numbers of African-Americans, Hispanics, and Asian-Americans at America's top law firms. The group has sent information to top law schools around the country to encourage students who agree with its viewpoint to take the demographic data into account when they choose where to work after graduation. As more students choose where to work based on firms' diversity rankings, firms face an increasing market pressure to change theirs.

== Examples of racial quotas ==
- Affirmative Action in some but not all cases
- Asian quota
- Jewish quota
- Reservation in India
- Reserved political positions

== See also ==
- All-women shortlists
- Anti-racism
- Diversity (business)
- Equality of opportunity vs Equality of outcome
- Gender quota
- Numerus clausus
- Reverse discrimination
- Regents of the University of California v. Bakke
