= Alexander Hart =

Confederate States Army officer

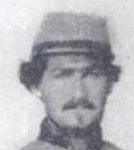
Major Alexander Hart C.S.A

Alexander Hart (October 1, 1839 – September 21, 1911) was a major in the Confederate Army during the American Civil War.

== American Civil War ==
Hart hailed from New Orleans and commanded soldiers from the Fifth Louisiana Regiment during the war.

A veteran of many battles, Hart led troops in the Confederate victories at the Second Battle of Winchester (see Winchester II Confederate order of battle), and Second Battle of Kernstown (which Hart noted in his journal). Hart recorded in his journal that his regiment also participated in pushing back Union troops at the Battle of Smithfield Crossing. During the Battle of Strasburg, Hart's regiment captured numerous Union troops. Hart noted in his journal that his regiment "Captured a Lt. Col. And some dirty non-coms. Officers and men."

Some sources claim that Hart fought at the Battle of Monocacy (see Monocacy Confederate order of battle), but his journal makes no mention of this battle. Rather, Hart records traveling with his troops across Virginia on the date of the battle.

Hart also led his regiment at the Battle of Gettysburg. On the second day of the battle, Hart led the 5th Louisiana in a charge up East Cemetery Hill. Wounded in his left hand by the fire of the 107th Ohio Infantry, Hart was replaced in command of the regiment by Captain Thomas Briscoe of Company K. He spent the rest of the summer of 1863 recovering from his wound and was certified as permanently disabled in November. Hart mentions in his journal that he was injured in battle upon at least two occasions—first at Antietam and at the Battle of Opequon.

Simon Wolf's 1895 book, The American Jew as Patriot, Soldier and Citizen, notes that Hart first held the rank of a non-commissioned colonel before being commissioned as a major in 1863.

After returning to Confederate territory as part of a prisoner exchange, Hart later was assigned to the general staff of a Montgomery, Alabama-based General Williams.

== Religious and personal life ==
Hart was born in New Orleans, the oldest of Isaac and Julia Hart's twelve children. He married his fiancée, Leonora Levy, (mentioned in his journal entry dated November 30, 1864, as "Leonna") in Richmond, Virginia, August 15, 1866, and had four children.

Two of Leonora's brothers also fought for the Confederacy, including Captain Ezekiel "Zeke" Levy and Isaac J. Levy, both of the 46th Virginia Infantry.

Many Jewish soldiers fought under Hart i

John Wayland, in his History of Rockingham County (c. 1912) writes that in 1890 "Major Hart of Staunton..." confirmed the first class in the congregation's "...new place of worship."

Robert Rosen, in The Jewish Confederates, said that after living in Staunton, Hart moved to Norfolk, Virginia. He was active in the Confederate War Veterans, serving as a commander in the Pickett-Buchanan Camp in Norfolk. Hart was reported to have led services in the Ohef Sholom Temple when the rabbi was absent. Hart died in ten days shy of his seventy-second birthday, and was buried in Norfolk. His tombstone reads "Major Alexander Hart, 5th La. Inf. C.S.A."
