= Friendship "Turtle" Park =

Park in Washington, D.C., U.S.

Friendship Park
- "Turtle Park"
- Location within District of Columbia Location within the United States
- Type: Urban park
- Location: 4500 Van Ness Street NW, Washington, D.C., United States
- Coordinates: 38°56′34″N 77°05′18″W
- Owner: District of Columbia

Friendship "Turtle" Park is located at the junction of 45th and Van Ness Streets in the American University Park neighborhood of Washington, D.C. It is part of District of Columbia Department of Parks and Recreation. Renovation in 2015 was delayed because a sewer was discovered running under the recreation center.
