= W.C. and A.N. Miller =

Real estate firm based in Bethesda, Maryland

W.C. and A.N. Miller Companies
- Industry: Real estate
- Founded: 1912; 114 years ago
- Founder: William C. and Allison N. Miller
- Headquarters: Bethesda, Maryland, United States
- Website: www.wcanmiller.com

The W.C. and A.N. Miller Companies are a group of related privately held real estate firms known for developing residential communities in Washington, D.C. and its surrounding metropolitan area. Developers of neighborhoods including Spring Valley and Wesley Heights in D.C., Sumner in Bethesda, and Potomac Falls in Potomac, Maryland, they were considered to be one of Washington's most renowned realty developers in the early 20th century.

== History ==
William Cammack and Allison Nailor Miller, brothers who grew up in Cleveland Park, were given $2,000 and two vacant lots in the Pleasant Plains area of Northwest Washington by their mother, as an incentive to go into business. They built two brick residences at 757 and 759 Kenyon Street, N.W., designed by Kendall & Smith, and in 1912 formed the W.C. & A.N. Miller Development Company.

For the next decade or so, they focused on building and selling residences in areas such as Cleveland Park, Woodley Park, and Petworth, mostly rowhouses. These proved highly popular, bringing acclaim to the company. In 1923, they acquired vacant land and began development of their first subdivision, Wesley Heights, with most buildings designed by Gordon MacNeil, who had joined in 1914.

After World War I, the U.S. Army vacated land owned by American University it had been using, and the university in turn began selling off this land, much of it to W.C. & A.N. Miller. In 1925, they began a new development on this land targeted at the wealthy, Spring Valley, which was widely acclaimed. Wesley Heights and Spring Valley were modeled on planned communities in Shaker Heights, Ohio, with the Millers seeking to develop it into the "Garden Spot of Washington. The company was incorporated the following year.

In 1929 they began work with Edward R. Spano, who joined the company as a draftsman and rose to chief architect after MacNeil's death, a position he held until his death in 1993.

William C. Miller died in 1939. Allison N. Miller remained active with the company until his own death in 1951, as the company built its first subdivision in Bethesda, Sumner, named after Fort Sumner in what is now Brookmont. Allison's son, Edward J. "Ted" Miller, assumed the presidency, and was in turn succeeded by his son, Edward J. Miller, Jr. The firm expanded into realty, moving, home improvement, lending, and commercial and residential management over the next several decades.

During the Civil Rights Movement, the company came under fire for its use of racially discriminatory covenants, which had been declared unenforceable by the U.S. Supreme Court in 1948. In 1959 hearings before the U.S. Commission on Civil Rights, testimony noted bars against ownership by Jews in areas controlled by the Miller Companies including Wesley Heights and Sumner, with Spring Valley cited to be "of particular significance" owing to the prominence of its residents. Members of the public also cited the company's past discrimination in testifying against Washington awarding an urban renewal contract to an affiliated company in 1961.

The below is a direct quotation from one of the restrictive covenants enforced by the company:

″No part of the land hereby conveyed shall ever be used or occupied by, or sold, demised, transferred, or conveyed under, to, or in trust for, leased, or rented, or given to, Negroes or any person or persons of Negro blood or extractions, or to any person of the Semitic race, blood, or origin, which racial description shall be deemed to include Armenians, Jews, Hebrews, Persians, and Syrians, except that this paragraph shall not be held to exclude partial occupancy of the premises by domestic servants of the occupants thereof.″

In 1986, the U.S. Army and American University began investigating whether parts of Spring Valley might have been used to dump munitions during World War I, but they did not inform the Miller Companies of the possibility. A pit containing high explosives and chemical weapons, including Lewisite, was discovered near 52nd Court in January 1993, and the U.S. Army Corps of Engineers began a cleanup under the Formerly Used Defense Sites program. The Miller Companies sued over the damage to its business, and the federal government paid them $2.1 million in compensation in a 1995 settlement. Cleanup work in Spring Valley continued into the early 2000s.

In 2007, the company announced the sale of its realty business and its affiliated mortgage lender, Greenway Lending Group, to Long & Foster.

== Developments ==
=== District of Columbia ===
- American University Park
- Spring Valley
- Wesley Heights

=== Maryland ===
- Sumner, Bethesda
- Overlook, Bethesda
- Spring Hill, Bethesda
- Potomac Falls, Potomac
- Spring Meadows, Gaithersburg

=== Virginia ===
- Spring Ridge, Vienna

== See also ==
- Antisemitism in Maryland
