= Asian Americans in Virginia =

Ethnic group in US state

Asian Virginians make up 7% of Virginia's population, and up to at least 7.5% including those considered partially Asian. The population is at least 500,000. The largest Asian groups in Virginia are mainly Indians (South Asians), Chinese, Filipinos, Koreans, and Vietnamese (East and Southeast Asians). The state has the 8th highest percentage of Asian residents according to the 2010 Census, and is culturally connected and rooted with its Asian community.

Most of Virginia's Asian population lives in metropolitan and suburban areas of Northern Virginia, especially Arlington, Fairfax, and Loudoun counties, where Asian Americans comprise at least 10% of the total population. There is also a less populous but moderately-sized Asian population in Virginia college towns, especially Blacksburg, Charlottesville, and Williamsburg, which are at least five percent Asian. Communities are also rife in areas of Richmond, Norfolk and Virginia Beach.

== History ==
Much of Virginia's Asian community is recent with growth in number and percentage, as well as markets, restaurants, and community centers. The growth started to rapidly increase in the 1980s and 1990s. Nearby Washington, D.C. is a major factor in the Asian population working in Washington, D.C. and living in Virginia and Maryland, or those who settled in Washington, D.C. first, especially its Chinatown.

== Population ==
The largest Asian group are Indians, who are at least 110,000 in number as per the 2010 US Census reports, and at least 1.2% of the state's population. Chinese, Koreans, and Vietnamese make up at least 0.5% of the state's population, with Koreans making up about a percent and having a history of being the largest East Asian group. Although the Chinese population at 59,000 as per the 2010 Census is lower than the Koreans’ 82,000, the Chinese population according to 2019 estimates shows an increase in the state, nearing 90,000.

The largest Asian American ancestries in Virginia are:

- Indian American, 125,000 or 1.51% of the population
- Filipino American, 72,600 or 0.9% of the population
- Korean American, 70,000 or 0.83% of the population
- Chinese American, 69,000 or 0.82% of the population
- Vietnamese American, 60,000 or 0.72% of the population
- Pakistani American, 33,000 or 0.4% of the population

Virginia has the fifth-highest percentage of Korean Americans and Vietnamese Americans of any state, the seventh-highest percentage of Indian Americans and Filipino Americans of any state, the 13th-highest percentage of Chinese Americans, and the highest percentage of Pakistani Americans of any state.

The most spoken Asian languages in Virginia are:

- Korean, 58,000 speakers or 0.7% of the population; the most spoken language after English and Spanish and the third most spoken language in Virginia
- Chinese, 55,000 speakers or 0.7% of the population
- Vietnamese, 51,000 speakers or 0.6% of the population
- Tagalog or Filipino, 46,000 speakers or 0.6% of the population
- Urdu, 31,000 speakers or 0.4% of the population
- Telugu, 22,000 speakers or 0.3% of the population
- Hindi, 20,000 speakers or 0.3% of the population

== Northern Virginia ==
=== Fairfax County ===
Fairfax County has Virginia's largest Asian population, with Asian residents making up approximately 17% of county residents. In Fairfax County, 4% percent of residents are of Indian and Korean descent respectively, 3% Chinese and Vietnamese respectively, and communities of Pakistani (1%), Filipino (1-2%) have smaller but great presence in areas of the county. Cambodian, Laotian, Tibetan and Thai also have communities in Northern VA. The county's Asian population is larger than most places in the state and country partly due to its school system, Fairfax County Public Schools, noted for having higher standards of education and test scores. One of its high schools, Thomas Jefferson High School, is at least 75% Asian as of 2020, with much of them being Chinese, Indian, Korean, and Vietnamese. It is one of the few Asian-majority high schools in the East Coast, along with Brooklyn Technical High School and Stuyvesant High School in New York City, also selective admission magnet schools and J.P. Stevens High School in Edison, New Jersey, and a few other public and private schools mainly found in Atlanta, DC, and New York areas.

Within Fairfax County, large populations exist within Chantilly, Centreville, and Floris/Herndon areas. Most of these communities are over 20% Asian.

=== Other ===
Loudoun County and Prince William County are 19-22% and 8-10% Asian, around 2019-2020 census data.

=== Virginia Beach ===
Virginia Beach has a significant Filipino population, at least 4%, and some Chinese, Indian, Korean and Vietnamese residents which make up 1% or less.

== Notable Asian American Virginians ==
- Jaycee Chan, son of Jackie Chan lived in Virginia temporarily, attending College of William and Mary
- Archie Kao, actor
- Jose Llana, singer
- Eddie Huang, chef, writer, and TV personality, spent some of his childhood in Fairfax County
- Thao Nguyen, singer-songwriter
- Michael H. Park, United States federal judge
- Ed Wang, NFL player
- Constance Wu, actress

=== South Asians ===
- Amna Nawaz, broadcast journalist
- Ravi Shankar, poet, editor and professor
