= The Jewish Confederates =

2001 history book authored by Robert N. Rosen

- Author: Robert N. Rosen
- Language: English
- Genre: American history
- Publisher: University of South Carolina Press
- Publication date: 2001
- ISBN: 9781570033636
- OCLC: 254985354

The Jewish Confederates is a 2001 history book authored by Robert N. Rosen about Jewish citizens of the Confederate States of America who served in the Confederate States Army (CSA) during the American Civil War of 1861–1865. As they made up just 0.2% of the CSA, their story had not been heavily researched before Rosen, a Jewish lawyer in Charleston, South Carolina, with a master's degree in history from Harvard University, authored the book. It received both praise and criticism in many academic journals. Rosen has written two more books about the city of Charleston.

== Summary ==
Rosen gives an overview of Jewish participation in the Confederate States Army (CSA) during the American Civil War of 1861–1865, and their attachment to the extant Confederate States of America. Even though Jews were only 2,000 out of 1 million members of the CSA, Rosen shows that both Sephardi Jews, who had historically been in the South, especially Charleston, South Carolina, and Ashkenazi Jews, most of whom were immigrants from Prussia, joined the Confederacy alongside their neighbors and fought against the Union. While the book mentions well-known Jewish Confederates such as Judah P. Benjamin, Moses Ezekiel, David Levy Yulee, Abraham Myers and Phoebe Pember, and lesser known Jewish Confederates like Henry M. Hyams, Benjamin F. Jonas, Adolph Proskauer and Alexander Hart, it is also full of vignettes about the lives of ordinary Southern Jewish families who sent their sons to the war front, as well as their daughters and mothers, who often acted as Confederate informants.

== Critical reception ==
In the Journal of Southern History, Leonard Dinnerstein, a professor of history at the University of Arizona, praised the book for its academic rigor. Similarly, in a review for the South Carolina Historical Magazine, Gordon C. Rhea called the book "a thoughtful and readable narrative packed with information and insights" as well as "a fine piece of scholarship and a fascinating read." Reviewing it for Pennsylvania History: A Journal of Mid-Atlantic Studies, Sheldon S. Cohen praised it as "an engaging and expansive portrayal of a small, yet singular, group of Americans and their involvement in one of this nation's most determinative and monumental conflicts." In the Georgia Historical Quarterly, Mark K. Bauman of the Atlanta Metropolitan College praised the book as "a carefully documented, nuanced study based on numerous primary sources that is grounded in the appropriate historical literature."

In a review for The New York Times, Roy Hoffman called the book "comprehensive and readerly" but he stressed that it was "sometimes inconsistent as social analysis." Similarly, in the Pennsylvania Magazine of History and Biography, Frederic Krome of The Jacob Rader Marcus Center of the American Jewish Archives, called the book "well-written and organized" but "not very analytical." In particular, he criticized Rosen's effort to "downplay" Southern anti-Semitism.

Reviewing it for Shofar, Robert E. May, a professor of history at Purdue University, highlighted Rosen's contention that Jews were better accepted in the South than the North both in the Antebellum era and during the war. He concluded by calling the book "a truly invaluable contribution to American Jewish historiography." In Louisiana History: The Journal of the Louisiana Historical Association, David T. Gleeson, a professor of history at Northumbria University, criticized Rosen for failing to delve into the differences between anti-Semitism in the North and the South. Nevertheless, he praised the book for filling "a major gap in the historiography of the Confederacy."

Robert A. Taylor, a professor of history at Florida International University, praised the book as "a significant contribution to the literature of the Civil War South and American Jewish history." He also noted that the Jewish culture of the Antebellum South was mostly gone after the war, as new Jewish immigrants distanced themselves from it. Meanwhile, in American Jewish History, Jonathan D. Sarna, the Joseph H. and Belle R. Braun Professor of American Jewish History at Brandeis University, dismissed the book as "an apologia, a pious bow to the 'religious of the lost cause'." Specifically, he criticized the chapters about the Reconstruction Era on the grounds that Rosen's "sources are meager and his one-sidedness embarrassing." He concluded by reiterating that the book "does justice to one side of the conflict alone."

Rosen states in the preface, "Modern-day Jews are very uncomfortable with the notion that antebellum Southern Jews owned slaves and that a few were in the business of slave trading. After all, Jews are unique among people in telling the story of their own enslavement ... Jewish Americans are understandably ill at ease" with this fact. Rosen states that few Jews owned slaves and that a sense of duty to the place one lived and defending one's home and to counter anti-Semitic stereotypes played large roles in their support for the Confederacy. "Many Jewish historians, reflecting their own beliefs and preconceived notions and reading history from the present to the past, cannot bring themselves to believe that Jews voluntarily fought for the Confederacy," stated Rosen. Rosen describes General Ulysses S. Grant's General Order No. 11, expelling the Jews from the areas of Tennessee, Mississippi, and Kentucky under his control ("which was not an isolated event") and Lee's written response to a captain turning down a Jewish soldier's request for religious leave that he (the officer) "should always respect the religious views and feelings of others" signify that their beliefs are incorrect and need to be set aside and further research in the original sources conducted. Rosen states that Lincoln's revocation of Grant's order does nothing to erase the fact that it was issued in the first place and that General Order No. 11 "would never have been issued by Robert E. Lee or Jefferson Davis." Historian Bertram Korn states that in the matter of Jewish chaplains for the military the Confederate Congress was more "liberal and tolerant" than that of the North, that the U.S. Congress only allowed non-Christian chaplains to minister to the spiritual need of Union troops after intense lobbying from Jewish groups and that the Confederacy welcomed all chaplains in their army.
