= Jewish quota =

Limits on Jewish immigration and education

A Jewish quota is a discriminatory racial quota designed to limit or deny access for Jews to various institutions. Such quotas were widespread in the 19th and 20th centuries in developed countries and frequently present in higher education, often at prestigious universities.

== By countries ==
=== Canada ===
Some universities in Canada, notably McGill University, the Université de Montréal and the University of Toronto Faculty of Medicine, had longstanding quotas on the number of Jews admitted to the respective universities. McGill University’s strict quota was the longest-running, having been officially adopted in 1920 and remaining in place until the late 1960s.

=== France ===
Vichy France established a Commissariat-General for Jewish Affairs led by the French antisemite and Nazi collaborator Xavier Vallat. It published the second law on the status of Jews on June 2, 1941, which sought to exclude Jews from economic life. A numerus clausus came into effect in the liberal professions of medicine, pharmacy, and the bar, as well as at universities and grandes écoles.

=== Germany ===
In Germany, a whole series of numerus clausus resolutions were adopted in 1929 on the basis of race and place of origin, not religion.

On 25 April 1933, the Nazi government introduced a 1.5% quota for new admissions of German non-Aryans—ie., essentially of German Jews—as core issue of a law claiming to generally limit the number of (Aryan and non-Aryan) students admitted to high-schools (höhere Schulen) and universities. In addition, high-schools and universities deemed to have more students than required for the professions for which they were training their students were required to reduce their student enrollment; in doing so, they had to reach a maximum of 5% of German non-Aryan students. The law was supposedly enacted to avoid overcrowding schools and universities, which cited apparent concerns at the time that large numbers of students would decrease the quality of higher education in Germany. At the beginning of 1933, about 0.76% of the German population was Jewish, but more than 3.6% of German university students were Jewish, this number having steadily declined from over 9% in the 1880s. After 30 July 1939, Jews were no longer permitted to attend German public schools at all, and the prior quota law was eliminated by a non-public regulation in January 1940.^{p. 193}

In addition to their strong and predominantly antisemitic agenda, the law and subsequent regulations were temporarily used to limit general university access to other groups that were not deemed "non-Aryan", as the name of the law implied. Starting in 1934, a regulation limited the overall numbers of students admitted to German universities, and a special quota was introduced reducing women's admissions to a maximum of 10%. Although the limits were not entirely enforced, the women's quota stayed a bit above 10% mainly because a smaller percentage of men than women accepted their university admissions, which made it approximately twice as hard for women to enter a university career than for men with the same qualification.^{S. 80ff.} After two semesters, these admission limits were revoked, however, leaving in place the non-Aryan regulations.^{p. 178}

=== Hungary ===
The Numerus Clausus Act was introduced in 1920, under the government of Pál Teleki. It was said that the ethnic makeup of student bodies must meet the ethnic rate of population, because Jews made up roughly 6% of the population, the policy effectively limited Jewish students to about 6% of university places, sharply reducing their previous representation of around 15%. The law was actively enforced by university administrators and nationalist student groups, who often harassed Jewish students, leading many Jews to pursue studies abroad. Limitations were relaxed in 1928 due to international pressure, namely the League of Nations. Racial criteria in admitting new students were removed and replaced by social criteria. Five categories were set up: civil servants, war veterans and army officers, small landowners and artisans, industrialists, and the merchant classes.

=== Poland ===
See Numerus clausus in Poland and Ghetto benches.

=== Romania ===
Numerus Clausus was not introduced by law, but it was adopted by students in the universities Cluj, Bucharest, Iasi and Cernauti.

=== Russia ===
Numerus Clausus was enacted in 1887, stating that the share of Jewish students should be no more than 10 percent in cities where Jews were allowed to live, 5 percent in other cities, and only 3 percent in Moscow and St. Petersburg. As well, there were quotas for Jewish and other non-Orthodox or non-Russian persons in joining the army. These limitations were removed in the spring of 1917 after the February Revolution and the establishment of the liberal-socialist Russian Provisional Government.

After the October Revolution and subsequent rise of the Soviet Union, the initial phase of the Cold War and the tide of the anti-"rootless cosmopolitan" campaign, a de facto gross discrimination of Jewish applicants was reintroduced in many institutions of higher education in the Soviet Union until the Perestroika in the 1980s, leading to the movement of refuseniks – a movement of Soviet Jews seeking emigration to Israel which was nearly impossible due to movement restrictions and exit visas.

=== United States ===
Certain private universities, most notably Harvard, introduced policies which effectively placed a quota on the number of Jews admitted to the university. Abbott Lawrence Lowell, the president of Harvard University from 1909 to 1933, raised the alarm about a ‘Jewish problem’ when the number of Jewish students grew from six percent to twenty-two percent between 1908 and 1922. Lowell argued that a "limit be placed on the number of them who later be admitted to the university." The implementation of a quota on the number of Jews was not unique to Harvard. After Harvard’s 1926 announcement about instating a "new admissions policy [that] would place great emphasis on character and personality, the Yale Daily News praised its decision and put forward its own version of how Yale should select its students in a major editorial, ‘Ellis Island for Yale.’ It called on the university to institute immigration laws more prohibitive than those of the United States government."

According to historian David Oshinsky, writing about Jonas Salk, "Most of the surrounding medical schools (Cornell, Columbia, Pennsylvania, and Yale) had rigid quotas in place. In 1935 Yale accepted 76 applicants from a pool of 501. About 200 of those applicants were Jewish and only five got in." He notes that Dean Milton Winternitz's instructions were remarkably precise: "Never admit more than five Jews, take only two Italian Catholics, and take no blacks at all." As a result, Oshinsky added, "Jonas Salk and hundreds like him" enrolled in New York University instead. Physicist and Nobel laureate Richard P. Feynman was turned away from Columbia College in the 1930s and went to MIT instead.

According to Dan Oren's book, Joining the Club — A History of Jews and Yale, Yale University's informal admissions policy to restrict the school's Jewish student body to around 10 percent ended in the early 1960s.

=== Yugoslavia ===
In 1940, the government of the Kingdom of Yugoslavia enacted the Decree on the Enrollment of Persons of Jewish Descent at the University, Secondary School, Teacher Training College and Other Vocational Schools which limited the proportion of Jewish students to the proportion of Jews in the total population.

== See also ==
- Asian quota
- Disabilities (Jewish)
