= Abraham S. Kay =

American businessman

Abraham Simon Kay
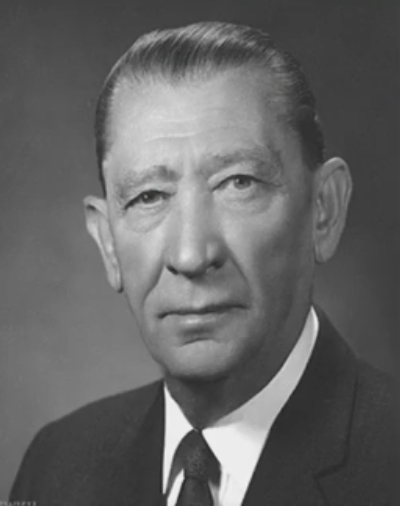
- Born: February 15, 1899; Vilnius, Vilna Governorate, Russian Empire
- Died: July 10, 1963 (age 64); Bethesda, Maryland, United States
- Known for: Founder of Kay Construction Company
- Spouse: Minnie Kay
- Children: Jack Kay and Sylvia Kay Greenberg

Abraham Simon Kay (February 15, 1899 – July 10, 1963) was an American real estate developer and Zionist activist. He was a founder and longtime member of the Kay Construction Company in the District of Columbia and Maryland area, and a philanthropic contributor to the Jewish community.

== Biography ==
Born to a Jewish family, Kay moved to the United States from Vilnius at the age of 10. At the age of 12 he dropped out of Washington Elementary School on July 4, 1909 and began working at a grocery store due to a tough financial situation at home. A few years later, he managed to save up enough money to purchase his own grocery store. After returning home from being a sergeant in World War I, Kay married his wife, Minnie, and founded the District Grocery Society renamed District Grocery Stores (DGS) in 1928. Thanks to the money made from the grocery organization, in the 1930s Kay bought land in the Silver Spring area in Maryland, thus leading the way to forming the Kay Construction Company in 1936. For the first time, he made it possible for Jews to join the Indian Spring Golf and Country Club in 1939, though African-Americans and other non-white minorities were still excluded from membership until the mid-1960s. Prior to the passage of the 1968 Fair Housing Act and before his death in 1963, Kay used racially restrictive covenants to exclude African Americans and other racial minorities from neighborhoods he helped develop.

Kay has earned much recognition for being involved in other groups such as being chairman for the team that purchased SS Exodus. This was the ship that tried to bring Jewish immigrants to Palestine in 1947. He also supported a rehabilitation center at Nahariya for disabled Israeli military veterans. It is funded by the Abe S. Kay Foundation, Inc. which he was president of. Just a month before he died, Kay donated 350,000 dollars to the American University to build the Kay Spiritual Life Center, forming the first interfaith chapel on its campus.

In 1963, Kay died of a heart attack at Washington Hospital Center while living in Bethesda, Maryland. He and his wife Minnie had two children, Jack Kay and Sylvia Kay Greenberg.

== Organizations and achievements ==
- General chairman of the United Jewish Appeal of Greater Washington
- Honorary chairman of the Washington Committee for Israel bonds
- Helped with the revamping of the Israel Embassy in Washington
- Honored in 1956 by the Washington Jewish community as "Man of the Year."
- High tribute was paid by Israel Premier Ben-Gurion and Ambassador Abba Eban
- Served as president of the Abe S. Kay Foundation, Inc.
