= Carl M. Freeman =

American real estate developer and manager

- Born: December 17, 1910; Worcester, Massachusetts
- Died: July 2, 1998 (aged 87); Santa Fe, New Mexico
- Occupations: Real estate developer and manager
- Spouse(s): Beatty Freeman (divorced), Virginia Freeman
- Relatives: Carla Freeman, Lisa Freeman, Joshua Freeman, Susan Freeman McGee

Carl M. Freeman (December 17, 1910 – July 2, 1998) was an American real estate developer and manager in the Greater Washington region. During his career, Freeman built over 20,000 houses and apartment units in Washington, D.C., and its Maryland and Virginia suburbs. He also built Sea Colony at the Delaware beach.

== Early life ==
Freeman was born in Worcester, Massachusetts, to a Jewish family. His family's original surname was Freedman. He attended Northeastern University.

== Career ==
In the early 1930s, Freeman worked for General Securities Corp. He established a real estate business in Washington, D.C., in 1934. Between 1937 and 1942, Freeman worked in Los Angeles for the real estate builder Fritz Burns. For decades Freeman served as chairman, chief executive officer, and treasurer of Carl M. Freeman Associates, Inc.

Prior to the passage of the Fair Housing Act of 1968, Freeman used racial covenants to exclude African-Americans from housing. During the 1960s, Freeman was picketed by protesters who opposed the "whites-only" policy at his Americana apartment project in Maryland. The Action Coordinating Committee to End Segregation (ACCESS) was one of the groups that picketed Freeman. After several years of being picketed and shortly before the passage of civil rights legislation in 1968, Freeman began renting all apartment units regardless of race.

Freeman contributed to many charitable causes and advocacy organizations, including the John F. Kennedy Center for the Performing Arts, I Have a Dream Foundation, United Jewish Appeal, the Jewish Community Center of Greater Washington, and the Treatment Learning Centers. He served as chairman of the Maryland Israel Bonds Committee.

== Death ==
Freeman was killed in a car crash in Santa Fe, New Mexico, on July 2, 1998, at the age of 87. He was pronounced dead on the scene. His wife and daughter sustained injuries. Freeman is buried at Tusculum Farm in Laytonsville, Maryland. Tusculum Farm, historically known as Sundown Farms, is included in the Maryland Inventory of Historic Properties.
