= Spring Valley (Washington, D.C.) =

Spring Valley, Washington, D.C.
- Neighborhood of Washington, D.C.
- Spring Valley
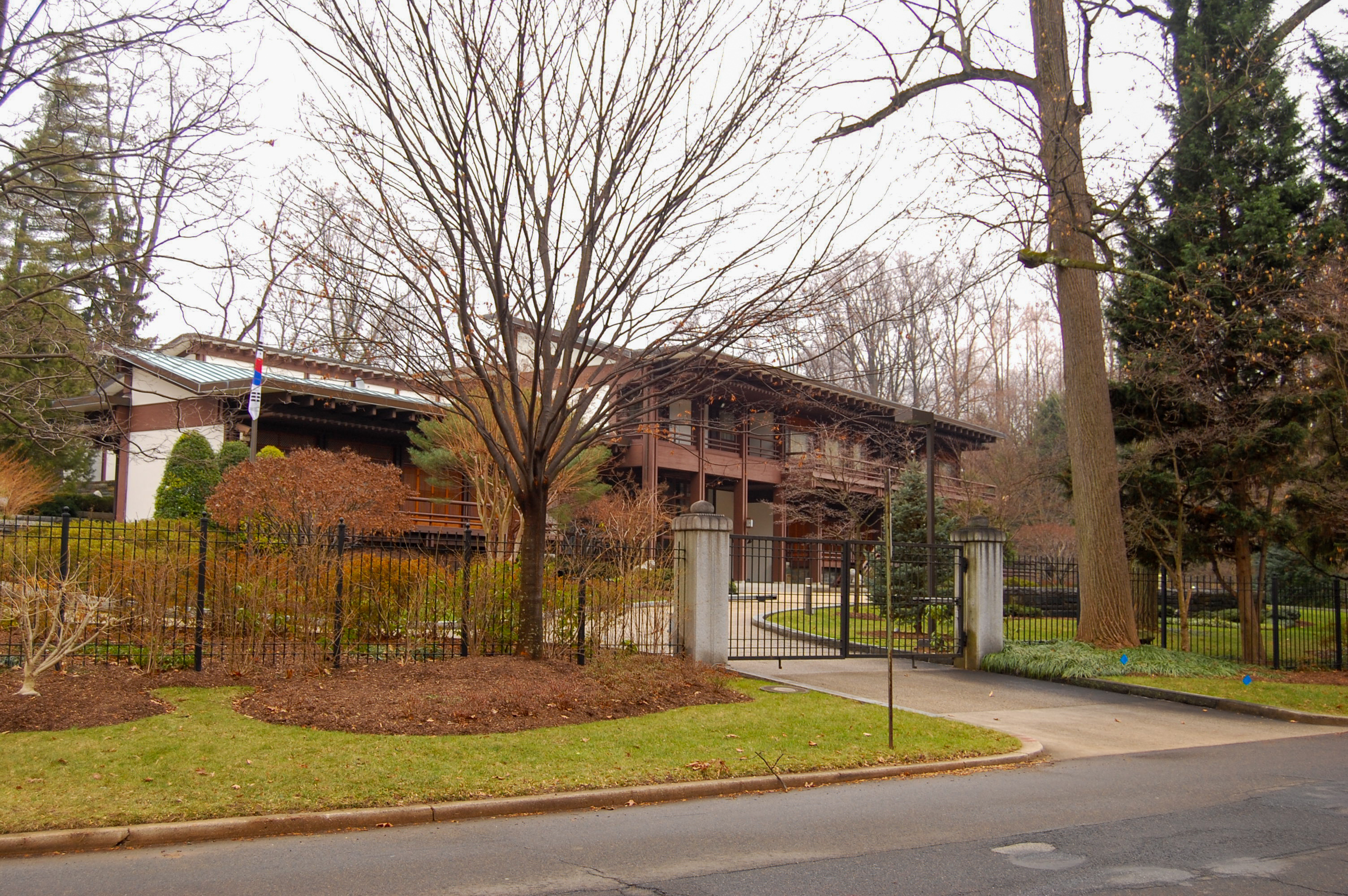
- South Korean ambassador's residence on Glenbrook Road

- Map of Washington, D.C., with Spring Valley highlighted in red
- Coordinates: 38.94018°N 77.09677°W
- Country: United States
- District: Washington, D.C.
- Ward: Ward 3

Government
  - Councilmember: Matthew Frumin
- Postal code: ZIP code

Spring Valley is a largely residential neighborhood in Ward 3, Northwest Washington, D.C. As of July 2021, it was the most expensive neighborhood in the District, with homes selling at a median price of $1.465 million.

== Residents ==
Spring Valley's residents include notable media personalities (e.g., Tim Russert, Tony Kornheiser, Ann Compton, Jim Vance), lawyers (e.g., United States Attorney General Eric Holder, Brendan Sullivan), politicians, corporate officers, and other members of elite Washington society (e.g., Washington Nationals principal owners Ed Cohen and Debra Cohen). After the Second World War, General of the Army Omar Bradley moved to a house on Indian Lane. As a Senator and then Vice President, Richard Nixon lived on Tilden St. 1951–1957, after which he moved to neighboring Wesley Heights; his successor, Lyndon B. Johnson, after becoming Vice President under John F. Kennedy, purchased a three-story mansion named Les Ormes (The Elms) along 52nd Street NW that had previously been the home of socialite and ambassador Perle Mesta. George H. W. Bush also lived in the neighborhood prior to his White House years. Presently it is the residence of the ambassador of Algeria. Warren Buffett and sister Doris Buffett lived on 49th Street during their years attending Wilson High School.

It had the highest percentage of people voting for Donald Trump of any precinct in the 2016 election, at 15%.

== History ==
The neighborhood was the flagship development of the W.C. and A.N. Miller Companies, which sold its first homes in the subdivision in 1928, and built and sold homes there over the next 80 years. The neighborhood was originally deed-restricted, with W.C. and A.N. Miller prohibiting the sale or rental of the property to "persons of Negro blood or extraction, or to any person of Semitic race, blood, or origin, which racial description shall be deemed to include Armenians, Jews, Hebrews, Persians, and Syrians"; the Millers claimed that these covenants reflected the desires of the residents, and not the prejudice of the company or its officers, and anyway could not be eliminated. Although the U.S. Supreme Court ruled such covenants were unenforceable in 1948, they remained in the language of the deeds and were the subject of litigation until the passage of the 1968 Fair Housing Act.

Much of the land was formerly owned by American University. In 1917 the federal government established a weapons testing facility on land leased from the university, and the U.S. Army established Camp Leach to produce and test chemical weapons there, including mustard gas components, lewisite, and arsenic. The Army closed down the facility after World War I, and the university sold off the property for development. In 1993, construction workers discovered unexploded chemical mortar rounds and 75mm shells, and the U.S. Army Corps of Engineers carried out a cleanup dubbed Operation Safe Removal over the next two years which uncovered 141 munitions, including 42 poison gas shells. Nevertheless, reports of health problems continued and in 1997, the U.S. Agency for Toxic Substances and Disease Registry, at the request of D.C. Department of Health officials, released a report indicating the Army Corps of Engineers had botched the cleanup. Further investigations found that the contamination was not widespread, and limits to certain plots, notably the home at 4825 Glenbrook Road NW. Its owners, whose lawyers characterized the plot as the "mother of all toxic dumps," settled a federal lawsuit with the government, American University, and W.C. and A.N. Miller, and the house was demolished in 2012. Excavation and restoration at the 4825 Glenbrook site took 8 years, being declared complete in August 2020.

The cleanup by 2013 had cost the army $221 million, before being paused in 2014 for three years. Between 2000 and 2017, more than 500 additional munition items, 400 pounds of laboratory glassware, and 100 tons of contaminated soil were removed as the cleanup continued. Work was paused with the discovery of an unknown substance containing low levels of mustard gas, and again after seven workers were sickened. By 2018, more than 1,600 homes had been screened for potentially elevated levels of arsenic, and contaminated soil had been removed from 180 homes.

== Geography ==
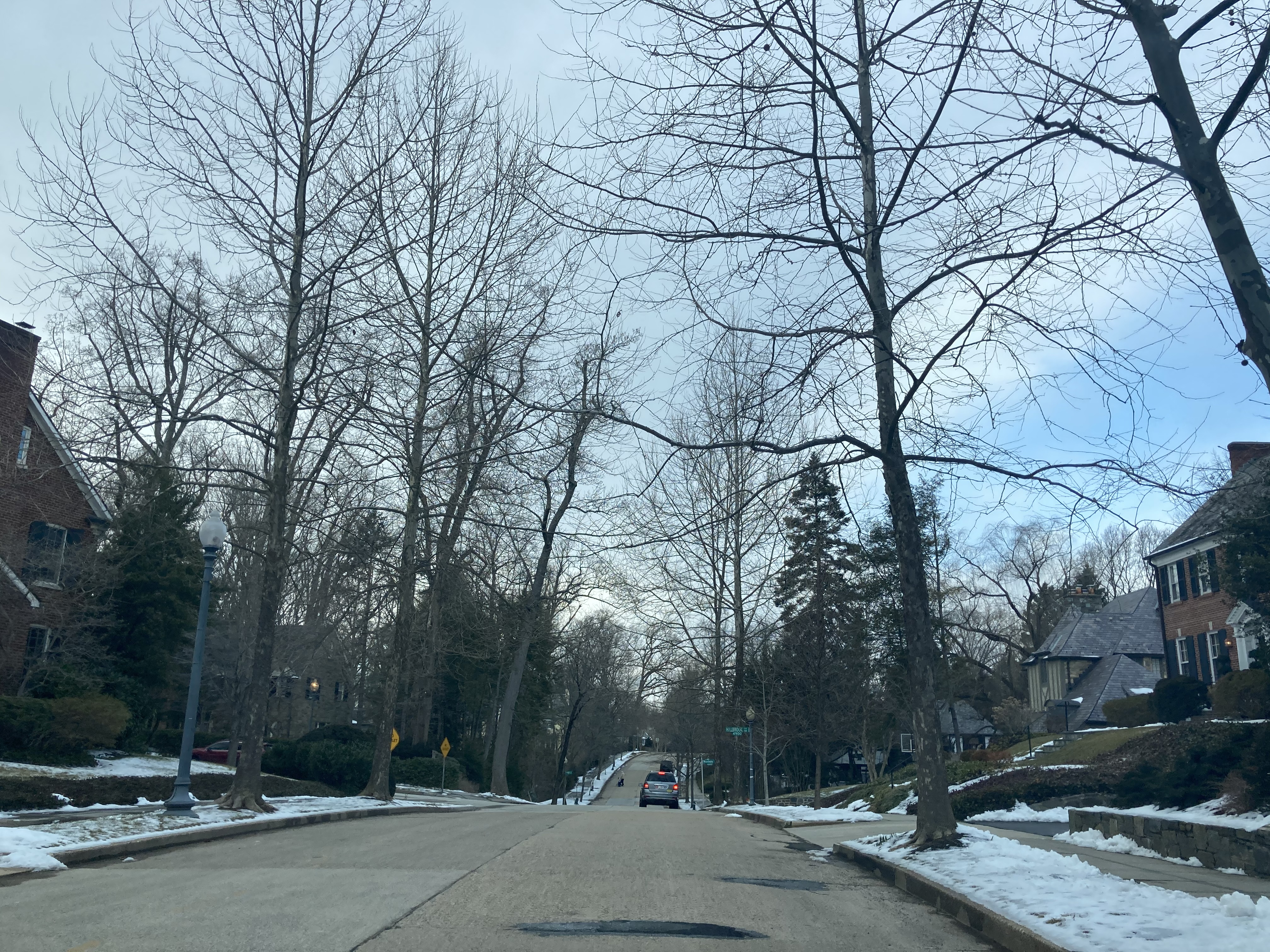
Intersection of 49th St. and Hillbrook Lane NW in February 2021

The neighborhood is bounded by Nebraska Avenue and Loughboro Road to its south, Dalecarlia Parkway to its west, and Massachusetts Avenue to its northeast; Dalecarlia and Mass. Ave. converge at Westmoreland Circle, on the Maryland border.

Massachusetts Avenue is the main commercial corridor serving the area. Neighborhood landmarks include the main campus of American University and the Wesley Theological Seminary, at 4400 and 4500 Massachusetts Ave. NW respectively. The former Washington College of Law campus at 4801 and 4910 Massachusetts Avenue is also here, although the institution has since moved to nearby Tenleytown. Paradoxically, the neighborhood to the northeast is called American University Park, even though the bulk of the main campus is located in Spring Valley.

Several embassy residences are located in the neighborhood, including the ambassador's houses of South Korea, Canada, Croatia, Mexico, Bahrain, Qatar, Uganda, Chile, Luxembourg, Algeria, Yemen and Estonia.

== Education ==
American University and Wesley Theological Seminary are located in the southeast of the neighborhood. No elementary or secondary institutions are located in Spring Valley; District of Columbia Public Schools students attend Horace Mann Elementary School, Hardy Middle School, and Jackson-Reed High School.

== Notes ==
- "Camp Leach: When Chemical Weapons Were Made at American University". Ghosts of DC. November 19, 2019.
