= Numerus clausus =

Method used to limit the number of students who may study at a university

Numerus clausus ("closed number" in Latin) is one of many methods used to limit the number of students who may study at a university. In many cases, the goal of the numerus clausus is simply to limit the number of students to the maximum feasible in some particularly sought-after areas of studies with an intent to keep a constant supply of qualified workforce and thus limit competition. In historical terms however, in some countries, numerus clausus policies were intentional religious or racial quotas.

Countries legislating limitations on the admission of Jewish students, at various times, have included: Austria, Canada, Hungary, Imperial Russia, Iraq, Latvia (from 1934 under the Kārlis Ulmanis regime), Netherlands, Poland, Romania, the United Kingdom, United States, Vichy France, and Yugoslavia.

== Historical examples ==
=== Germany ===
A whole series of resolutions demanding numerus clausus were put forward by students' organizations in 1929, based on race, place of origin, or religion. On 25 April 1933, the Nazi government introduced a 1.5 percent quota for new admissions of German non-Aryans, essentially of German Jews enrolling to German high schools and universities.

=== Hungary ===
The Hungarian numerus clausus was introduced in 1920. The law formally placed limits on the number of minority students at universities and legalized corporal punishment. Though the text did not use the term Jew, it was nearly the only group overrepresented in higher education. The policy is often seen as the first anti-Jewish act of twentieth century Europe.

Its aim was to restrict the proportion of Jewish students to 6 percent, which was their proportion in Hungary at that time; the rate of Jewish students was approximately 15% in the 1910s. In 1928, stating minority-protection obligations under the postwar peace settlement and acknowledging complaints from Hungarian Jews, the act was modified and the passage of the ethnicity quota was eliminated. From 1938 to 1945 the anti-Jewish acts were revitalised and eventually much worsened, partly due to German Nazi pressure and in the hope of revising the Treaty of Trianon with the help of Germany.

=== Poland ===
Polish universities were a hotbed of the radical far-right National Democracy and from Poland's independence in 1918 right-wing students promoted the return of the Russian numerus clausus system. Attempts by the University of Lwów to implement numerus clausus in 1922-3 were ruled unconstitutional. In the early 1930s, Camp of Great Poland advocated numerus nullus – a complete exclusion of Jews. In 1931, the All-Polish Youth demonstrated against Jewish medical students operating on Christian cadavers. The medical faculties caved in, and Jewish students were supplied with Jewish cadavers. Polish radicals then demanded segregation of Jewish students, first asking for "voluntary" segregation and when this was refused attacking Jewish students. Following violent demonstrations by Polish radicals, in 1937-8 most Polish universities introduced segregation. By 1939, most Polish institutes of higher learning implemented a numerus clausus system.

=== United Kingdom ===
While not strictly a quota, most universities in the United Kingdom required students, faculty, and fellows to be members of the Church of England, excluding all others, until the Universities Tests Act 1871 was passed.

=== USSR ===
Certain scientific and educational institutions in the USSR, such as the MSU Faculty of Mechanics and Mathematics implemented anti-Jewish restrictions in the second half of the twentieth century under the guise of numerus clausus. Officially claimed to help promote enrollment of applicants belonging to ethnic minorities underrepresented in Soviet science, such as Yakuts, this policy was effectively used to discriminate Jewish applicants. According to Edward Frenkel, this led to a creation of a strong mathematical community in the advanced mathematics department of Gubkin Russian State University of Oil and Gas, which as a consequence was composed to a significant degree of Jewish students denied entry to the Moscow State University.

=== North America ===
Between 1918 and the 1950s a number of private universities and medical schools in the United States introduced numerus clausus policies limiting admissions of students based on their religion or race to certain percentages within the college population. Many minority groups were negatively impacted by these policies; one of the groups affected was Jewish applicants, whose admission to some New England- and New York City-area liberal arts colleges fell significantly between the late 1910s and the mid-1930s. For instance, the admission to Harvard University during that period fell from 27.6% to 17.1% and in Columbia University from 32.7% to 14.6%. Corresponding quotas were introduced in the medical and dental schools resulting during the 1930s in the decline of Jewish students: e.g. in Cornell University School of Medicine from 40% in 1918–22 to 3.57% in 1940–41, in Boston University Medical School from 48.4% in 1929–30 to 12.5% in 1934–35. At Yale University, Dean Milton Winternitz's instructions to the admissions office regarding ethnic quotas were very specific: "Never admit more than five Jews, take only two Italian Catholics, and take no blacks at all." During this period, a notable exception among U. S. medical schools was the medical school of Middlesex University, which had no quotas and many Jewish faculty members and students; school officials believed that antisemitism played a role in the school's failure to secure AMA accreditation.

The most common method, employed by 90% of American universities and colleges at the time to identify the "desirable" (native-born, white, Protestant) applicants, was the application form questions about their religious preference, race, and nationality. Other more subtle methods included restrictions on scholarships, rejection of transfer students, and preferences for alumni sons and daughters.

Legacy preference for university admissions was devised in 1925 at Yale University, where the proportional number of Jews in the student body was growing at a rate that became alarming to the school's administrators. Prior to that year, Yale had begun to incorporate such amorphous criteria as 'character' and 'solidity', as well as 'physical characteristics', into its admissions process as an excuse for screening out Jewish students; but nothing was as effective as legacy preference, which allowed the admissions board to summarily pass over Jews in favor of 'Yale sons of good character and reasonably good record', as a 1929 memo phrased it. Other schools, including Harvard, soon began to pursue similar policies for similar reasons, and Jewish students in the Ivy League schools were maintained at a steady 10% through the 1950s. Such policies were gradually discarded during the early 1960s, with Yale being one of the last of the major schools to eliminate the last vestige with the class of 1970 (entering in 1966). While legacy admissions as a way of screening out Jewish students may have ceased, the practice of giving preference to legacies has continued to the present day. In the 1998 book The Shape of the River: Long-Term Consequences of Considering Race in College and University Admissions, authors William G. Bowen, former Princeton University president, and Derek Bok, former Harvard University president, found "the overall admission rate for legacies was almost twice that for all other candidates".

The religion preference question was eventually dropped from the admission application forms and noticeable evidence of informal numerus clausus policies in the American private universities and medical schools decreased by the 1950s.

Certain Canadian universities had longstanding quotas on the number of Jews admitted to the respective universities. McGill University's strict quota was the longest, being officially adopted in 1920 up until the late 1960s.

== Modern examples ==
The numerus clausus is used in countries and universities where the number of applicants greatly exceeds the number of available places for students. This is the case in many countries of continental Europe. Students in much of Europe choose their field of specialization when they begin university study, unlike students in North America, who specialize later. Fields such as medicine, law, biology, dentistry, pharmacy, psychology and business administration are particularly popular and therefore harder to gain admittance to study.

=== Brazil ===
In November 2002 the Brazilian government passed Federal Law 10.558/2002, known as the "Quota Law". The law allowed for the establishment of racial quotas at public universities. In 2012 the Supreme Federal Court of Brazil unanimously upheld the law.

=== Germany ===
The numerus clausus is used in Germany to address overcrowding at universities. There are local admission restrictions, which are set up for a particular degree program (Studiengang) at the university's discretion, and nationwide admission restrictions in medicine, dentistry, veterinary medicine, and pharmacy. Not all degree programs restrict admissions. The most common admission criterion is the final grade of the university entrance qualification, that is the high school completion certificate formally allowing the applicant to study at a German university. Typically, this is the Abitur. The final grade takes into account the grades of the final exams as well as the course grades. In colloquial usage, numerus clausus may also refer to the lowest admitted grade in this process. Other criteria, e.g. interviews, are increasingly common as well.

=== Finland ===
The Finnish system of implementing the numerus clausus provides a comparison to the German model. In Germany, the main weight of the student selection lies on the Abitur grades (i.e. high school diploma). In Finland, which has a similar nationwide final exam, the matriculation examination (Finnish ylioppilastutkinto), the majority of student selections are based on entrance exams. Most degree programs consist of a single major subject and have their own entrance procedures. Nearly all programs have a quota in which the score is calculated solely on the basis of the entrance exam. The written exams usually consist of open-ended questions requiring the applicant to write an essay or solve problems. Multiple choice tests are uncommon.

In fields where the competition for study places is less fierce. This is especially the case with the engineering and natural science programs. It is relatively easy to be accepted in these fields—about one-third of the study places in technology are awarded on the basis of the matriculation exam. The rest of the students are admitted on the basis of an entrance exam. After receiving a study place, the student must accept it in writing on the pain of forfeiting the place. In case the students receive more than one study place, they must select one. During the year, one person may accept only a single study place in an institution of higher education. The system is enforced through a national database on student admissions.

In the Finnish system, the numerus clausus is the most important factor limiting student numbers. After gaining entrance, traditionally a student cannot be expelled, pays no tuition, and enjoys a state student benefit. The new legislation, introduced in the summer of 2005, limits the study period to seven years, but it is anticipated that it will be relatively easy to receive permission for a longer study time. No changes to the financial position of the student are currently being considered (as of the summer of 2005).

=== France ===
In France, admission to the grandes écoles is obtained by competitive exams with a fixed, limited number of positions each year. Also, at the end of the first year of medical studies in universities, until 2020, there was a competitive exam with a numerus clausus for determining which students are allowed to proceed to the second year; in later years of medical studies there is a competitive exam (concours de l'internat) for choosing medical specialties.

=== Ireland ===
Numerus clausus is also used in Ireland. University College Dublin uses the system in its admission for Medicine and Veterinary Medicine.

=== Switzerland ===
The introduction of the numerus clausus in Switzerland has limited access to medical studies at the universities. At all universities of the German-speaking part of Switzerland, the students need to have a high score on an aptitude test that comprises logical and spatial thinking and text understanding skills.

The universities in the western, French-speaking part of Switzerland did not decide to introduce a numerus clausus. Instead, these universities provide unrestricted access to the first-year curriculum in medicine; and the best first-year students are allowed to further their medical studies at the same or at another university. In other popular faculties like psychology or journalism, there are also aptitude tests—but they concern only a single university.

== Legislation ==
Numerus clausus is also used in law, property law in particular, as the principle that the system of estates allows only a limited number of property rights available in a legal system. The numerus clausus principle has its roots in Roman law. In German law the numerus clausus principle has a constitutional foundation and limits property rights in their number (Typenzwang) and content (Typenfixierung). Other European states show equal doctrines.

== Matters other than education ==
Numerus clausus is also a rule that regulates the number of practitioners of a public service in many areas. In the U.S., for instance, it can limit the number of liquor stores to be found in a given geographic area.

In France, it limits the distribution of public notaries geographically and, in effect, limits competition for their services (since their fees are fixed by the state). Notaries handle, for instance, title transactions, which is not allowed to lawyers in France. Similar limitations apply to pharmacists, and to licensed premises for the consumption of strong alcoholic beverages.

In India the system of caste quotas for job placement is enforced, and vigorously defended by strikes and riots.

Often, the rule is administered by the corporation or professional body to which the public servant must adhere, but it is also employed by state entities that have the responsibility for assuring the uniformity of a public service across a national geography.

== See also ==
- Affirmative action
- History of antisemitism in the United States
- Diversity, equity, and inclusion
- Ghetto benches
