= The Jewish Legal Heritage Society =

Israeli research institute

- מורשת המשפט בישראל
- Abbreviation: JLHS
- Formation: Founded 1981
- Headquarters: Jerusalem, Israel
- Key people: Rabbi Prof. Nahum Rakover
- Website: https://mishpativri.org.il/

The Jewish Legal Heritage Society publishes books, concludes researches, hosts seminars for the public, for law professionals and for youth.

== History of the organization ==
In 1981 the organization was founded with the initiative of the Israeli ministry of justice in purpose of adjusting modern law and court rulings to the values of Jewish law.

The founders of the organization include: former supreme court judges and Haim Cohen, former State Comptroller of Israel Itzchak Tonik, professors Itzchak Taberski and Shamma Friedman and the zionist activist Alfonzo Tzaba. The head researcher of the organization is Rabbai Professor Nahum Rakover.

== Research ==
The organization publishes introductory books, reference books and researches in different topics to improve the accessibility of Jewish law and its application to modern law. Researches working for the organization publish books discussing legal issues and compare Jewish law and Israeli law. The organizations flagship research project is the book series "Jewish law for Israel", written by the best researches of Jewish law and edited by prof. Rakover. The series, including 11 researches, goal is to create a systematic and up-to-date presentation of Jewish law indexed to Israeli law, with Jewish law presented as a basis for legislation and judicial decisions.

== Seminars ==
Together with the ministry of justice, the organization conducted over 90 seminars discussing timely legal topics. Workshops including moot court competitions are given over to students in middle and high school, both religious and secular. In these workshops the students learn about different topics involving law and moral, and apply there studies to a mock legal procedure where they are the prosecutor, the defendant and the judges. In addition, the organization hold international conferences with the participation of professionals and law scholars from around the world.

== Consulting committee ==
In 2006 the consulting committee of JLHS was founded. The committee members include: Prof. Robert Aumann, prof. Alan Dershowitz, prof. Elie Wiesel, Dr. Jacob Weinroth, Judge Tsevi E. Tal, Zelman Cowen, Rabbai Yisrael Meir Lau, prof. Norman Lamm, prof. David Libai, prof. Yaakov Neeman, sheikh prof. Abdul Falachi, prof. Irwin Cotler, prof. Aharon Kirshenboum.

== Publications ==
Along the years the organization has published many books and researches, including:

- The "Jewish law for Israel" series - 11 volumes on: guarantee law, torts, unjust enrichment, restoration of lost property, bailment, hire and loan, joint ownership, defensive contracts, trust, agency.
- A guide to the Sources of Jewish Law.
- Law and the Noahides.
- Ethics in the Market Place.
- Unjust Enrichment in Jewish law.
- Modern Applications of Jewish law.
- The Multilanguage Bibliography of Jewish Law.
- Jewish Law and Current Legal Problems.
- Maimonides as Codifier of Jewish Law.
- Jerusalem - City of Law and Justice.
