= 2013 Israeli protests =

- Date: May and November 2013
- Location: Israel
- Goals: End of Haredi conscription Prevention of displacement of Bedouin
- Status: Ended

Number
Tens of thousands	

In 2013, two independent protests occurred in Israel. In May, an attempt to change the Tal Law, which excluded ultra-Orthodox Jewish men for doing military service, led to protests by Haredi against military conscription. Again in November, Bedouins in the Negev called for a 'Day of Rage' against their displacement by the Israeli government to state developed townships as a result of the Prawer-Begin plan.

== Haredi protest ==
Following the announcements that the new government was planning to gradually incorporate the Haredi Jewish population of Israel into the country's armed forces, there were widespread protests against the government and the draft by the ultra-Orthodox community in Israel, called Haredim in Hebrew. Haredim are exempt from military service for religious reasons. This exemption has been given to the Haredi community since the establishment of the State of Israel and gives them the space to devote themselves fully to the study of the Torah. Many ultra-Orthodox men are not against the Israeli military as such and see themselves as patriots. However, they wish to contribute to the protection of the state by studying the scriptures in yeshivas, in order to obtain the protection from God.

The universal draft is an issue within Israeli society since the establishment of the state. In February 2012 the High Court of Justice considered the Tal Law, granting exemptions to yeshiva students, as unconstitutional, which caused unrest under the Haredim communities in Israel. Several attempts have been made before to formulate new laws in order to draft the Haredim into the Israeli military but without much success. This made Israeli political parties like Yesh Atid and Jewish Home make the issue of the draft of the Haredim community a key point in their political campaigns. In April 2013, a ministerial committee led by minister Yaakov Peri announced that a bill on national service for all citizens, including Haredim, would be presented to the Knesset within two months. Besides that, the coalition government of former prime minister Benjamin Netanyahu said to be committed to increase the military drafting of the Haredim. Because of this renewed attention to the issue of the universal drafting, pamphlets were handed out in Haredi neighbourhoods in Jerusalem to motivate the Haredi men to demonstrate against army drafting of yeshiva students.

On 16 May 2013, between 15,000 and 30,000 Haredi men demonstrated outside an IDF recruiting office in Jerusalem. Some allegedly threw stones and bottles at police and called them Nazis. Rabbis warned the ultra-Orthodox community that army service would seriously harm and threaten their way of life. As Rabbi David Zycherman told the protesters crowd: "The government wants to uproot [our traditions] and secularise us, they call it a melting pot, but people cannot be melted. You cannot change our [way of life],” Other protesters read out loud passages from the Torah to “annul the evil decree” of military service.

=== Background ===
Tension between the Haredi community and the state of Israel is something that existed for a long time. The Jewish State of Israel was proclaimed in 1948 because of Zionist ideology. Before the establishment of the state secular Zionist and Haredim already disagreed on what a Jewish state should look like and what the role of Judaism should be in that state. In the first place, the pre-state Haredi community was against the establishment of the state of Israel, since they believe this should be done by the Messiah who, according to most religious Jews, is still yet to come. Zionism has no legitimacy without Judaism, since it is based on the ancient covenant of the Jewish people with the Bible. Besides that, the Zionist needed worldwide Jewish support for the establishment of the state of Israel and needed to please the Haredi community. This was done by compromising on religious issues. Even though the Haredim did not support the man-made Jewish state, after the Holocaust almost all orthodox centers in Europe were destroyed and the establishment of the new state of Israel gave them the opportunity to rebuild their communities and guaranteed their lifestyle.

This resulted in a status quo agreement initiated by David Ben-Gurion and ultra-Orthodox party Agudat Israel. It assured that the establishment of the state would protect ultra-Orthodox lifestyle, including exclusion from military service of 800 yeshiva students. When Menachem Begin became president in 1977, all yeshiva students got exemption from military service, which resulted in an increase in yeshiva students. In the Haredi community it is common to have an average of 7 children per family, therefore the number of those exempt from military service is growing rapidly. In addition to being exempt from military service, the Haredi community also has a low labor participation rate and often live on benefits. These are paid from the taxes of working people in society who are mostly not Haredim and also serve the military. This is why the discussion of military drafting often reappears in Israeli politics, it is part of a greater discussion of equality in society and a cause of polarisation between the secular and Haredim in Israel.

In 1998, the Israel High Court of Justice decided that the unequal drafting of people in Israel was unreasonable and inequitable and asked the Knesset to find a solution. The government, which contained a coalition with the ultra-Orthodox parties Shas and the United Torah Judaism, set up a committee chaired by former Supreme Court Justice Tzvi Tal to study the issue (the Tal Committee) and to make policy recommendations. In 2002 the Tal Law (The Service Deferment Law for Yeshiva Students for whom the Torah is Their Trade) was passed. The Tal committee accepted the principle that national conscription should be done by everyone in Israel but only if someone would consent in going into the army. According to the Tal Committee, the resistance of the Haredi community that the drafting would bring, would not serve the interests either of the IDF or the nation. In addition, the Tal law offered 23-year-old ultra-Orthodox men an optional “year of decision” where they were given a year off to study secular subjects, engage in vocational training or find work, without endangering their draft exemption, after which they were allowed to decide whether they wanted to do military service or not. Only a few took advantage of this. The Tal law therefore did not change the regulations surrounding the drafting of the ultra-Orthodox but rather legalised the existing policy.

== Bedouin protests ==
On 30 November 2013, a 'Day of Rage' was called against the Prawer-Begin plan in which 40,000-70.000 Bedouin citizens are forced to move from their homes into townships, specially designed by the Israeli government. The Prawer-Begin plan intends to remove the tents of between 40.000 and 70.000 Bedouins from 35 villages out of their ancestral villages, which the government has classified as "illegal" and a "land grab,". The Bedouin community in Israel are Israeli citizens who make up around 30% of the population of the Negev, their villages take up around 2,5% of the land. Half of the Bedouin community in Israel lives in classified 'informal villages'. However, the Bedouin communities do not want to move from their villages and want to maintain their traditional, (semi)nomadic way of life.

The Prawer-Begin plan was established in 2011, a committee was set up by the Israeli government to make a plan regarding the Bedouins headed by planning policy chief Ehud Prawer. This committee proposed that 50% of the land claimed by the Bedouin be turned over to the state and the demolition of 35 unrecognized villages. The Bedouin had no representation in this committee. Former General Doron Almog, who is tasked with implementing the plan, said: "The idea is to ... better integrate Jews and Bedouins; to bring many more Bedouins to our work force; to employ and educate many more women for employment; and to build new communities; and to expand some of the current communities and make them modern." Its stated aim is also to "modernize" the Bedouin and improve their quality of life. US$340m has been allocated over five years for the project. According to the Bedouin community, it is the state of Israel that is denying them access to infrastructure, water and electricity because the state does not recognize their villages. The United Nations' High Commissioner for Human Rights Navi Pillay commented, "As citizens of Israel, the Arab Bedouins are entitled to the same rights to property, housing, and public services as any other group in Israel. The government must recognize and respect the specific rights of its Bedouin communities, including recognition of Bedouin land ownership claims."

The main protest was scheduled to be held near the Bedouin township of Hura on November 30, with other protests planned in Israel, the West Bank, the Gaza Strip and in several other cities across Europe, North America and the Middle East like Londen, Berlin, Rome, Istanbul and Cairo. Bedouin activist Huda Abu-Obeid said: "The government is trying to present the plan as 'in the best interest of the Bedouin', while with one hand it is acting to destroy Bedouin villages... and on the other it is building new Jewish localities in the Negev, some of these in the very same places where the [Bedouin] villages stand today." The aim of the protests, according to the Bedouin community, was to drop the Prawer-Begin plan because they consider it racist and see it as a way to drive Bedouins off their land. In the Negev, the Israeli police used teargas and water cannons against the protesters. Around 28 people in Haifa and the Negev got arrested, 15 police officers got injured.

Following expectation that the plan would fail a Knesset vote, it was canceled. Benny Begin, who jointly formulated the plan, said: "Right and left, Arabs and Jews joined forces - while exploiting the plight of many Bedouin - to heat things up for political gain. There is no majority in the coalition for the bill. [But Netanyahu agreed to] carry out the development plan for Bedouin settlements in the coming years."

=== Background ===
Before the establishment of the State of Israel in 1948, the Bedouin lived a nomadic life in the Negev, keeping animals and cultivating land. After the establishment of the state, it was difficult for Bedouins to claim the land where they lived. This was mainly due to the Ottoman-Turkish Tabu Law of 1858, which required landowners to register their land in order to pay tax over it. This happened very rarely among the Bedouins. As a result, they were not registered as owners and lost their rights over the land. This meant that by the 1970s the Israeli government removed most of the Bedouin settlements. The state of Israel mainly uses the Negev for building new housing, for military training and firing ranges. Israeli officials claim that they do not want to force Bedouins into sedentarization but want to help and guide them towards a permanent settlement on the land. However, the restrictive measures that Israel enforced made the Bedouin community experience a significant and rapid change in their economic and social life and therefore a strong influence and limitation of the Bedouin lifestyle.

== See also ==
- Protest against conscription of yeshiva students
- Israel Defense Forces
- Tal Committee
- Status quo (Israel)
- Religion in Israel
- Bedouin in Israel
- Negev Bedouin
- Unrecognized Bedouin villages in Israel
