= United Mizrahi Bank v. Migdal Cooperative Village =

1995 Supreme Court of Israel decision

- Court: Supreme Court of Israel
- Decided: November 9, 1995
- Citation: [1995] IsrLR 1

Court membership
- Judges sitting: Gabriel Bach; Eliezer Goldberg; Dov Levin; Eliyahu Matza; Tsevi E. Tal; Yitzhak Zamir; Meir Shamgar; Mishael Cheshin
- Chief judge: Aharon Barak

United Mizrahi Bank v. Migdal Cooperative Village [1995] IsrLR 1 is a landmark judgment of the Supreme Court of Israel that the Basic Laws of Israel are superior to other laws and are subject to judicial review. Aharon Barak described the judgment as a "constitutional revolution".
