= Plesner Committee =

The Plesner Committee (Hebrew: ועדת פלסנר), also known as the Commission for Equality in the Burden (Hebrew: הוועדה לקידום השוויון בנטל), was a committee established by the Government of Israel to formulate recommendations on the recruitment of Israelis to the Israel Defense Forces, in particular the recruitment of Haredim and Arabs. The committee was established prior to the anticipated expiration of Tal Law which exempted yeshiva students from mandatory military service in the IDF.

The committee included representatives of all the coalition parties, with the exception of the religious parties (Shas and the United Torah Judaism parties), which boycotted the committee. On July 2, 2012, about a month and a half after it was established, Israeli Prime Minister Benjamin Netanyahu dissolved the committee after several representatives withdrew from the coalition in protest over the way the committee was conducted. On 4 July, the chairman of the committee Yohanan Plesner published the committee's report although he was the only one who signed it.

== Background ==
On 23 July 2002 the Knesset passed the Tal Law, based on the recommendations of the Tal committee. The Tal Law set the conditions for the exemption of yeshiva students from military service. The law was a temporary one pending further consideration and set to expire after 5 years. On 18 July 2007, the Knesset extended the law by a further 5 years. On 21 February 2012, the Israeli Supreme Court declared the Tal Law unconstitutional, by 6 votes to 3, and that the law could not be extended after it expired on 1 August 2012.

As a result, the government established the Plesner Committee. It consisted of ten members, included both Knesset members and representatives of the public. The committee began deliberations on 21 May 2012, and the Prime Minister asked them to report by the end of July 2012.

== Members of the committee and professional teams ==
Committee members were:

- MK Yohanan Plesner, a representative of the Kadima party and committee chairman
- MK Ze'ev Elkin, a representative of the Likud party.
- MK David Rotem, a representative of the Israel Beiteinu party. Withdrew from the committee on June 28.
- MK Uri Orbach, a representative of the Jewish Home party. Withdrew from the committee on June 28.
- MK Einat Wilf, a representative of the Independence party.
- Yehuda Segev, former head of the Manpower Directorate.
- Attorney Jacob Weinroth. Withdrew from the committee on July 1.
- Yoav Kish, public representative, leader of the "HaMachana HaMeshutaf" (המחנה המשותף) movement
- Professor Yaffa Zilbershatz, a professor of law at Bar-Ilan University
- Professor Yedidia Stern, a professor https://www.haaretz.com/2012-02-19/ty-article/forgotten-artwork-by-one-of-the-fathers-of-the-dada-movement-restored-to-life-in-israel/0000017f-da74-dea8-a77f-de76b8550000 law at Bar-Ilan University

== Dissolution ==
Following the withdrawal of the representatives of the parties Israel Beiteinu the Jewish Home party, on 2 July 2012 Prime Minister Netanyahu informed that the committee would be dissolved because it could not form a recommendation without a majority.

Netanyahu's instructions on the dissolution of the committee created a political crisis within the coalition and an unsolvable dispute between Netanyahu and Kadima's chairman Shaul Mofaz.

== MK Plesner's report and recommendations ==
After the dissolution of the committee its chairman Plesner published a report on 4 July 2012 which was based on the draft of the committee's report. Plesner stated that he wrote the report himself, and some members of the committee, including Yedidia Stern, ostracized it. The aim set by in the report is to recruit 80% of the Israeli Jewish Haredim from 2016 onwards, and impose heavy fines on draft dodgers and on the yeshivas at which large numbers of draft dodgers study.

The main recommendations:

- The main aim: from 2016 onwards about 80% of all male Israeli Jewish Haredim at the age of 18 would serve a significant amount of time in the army or in civil service.
- Personal responsibility: the responsibility for serving the state would be on the individual - financial penalties, criminal punishment and the denial of benefits would be imposed on draft dodgers.
- Recruitment age: all people would be required to serve until age 22 except for a selected group of 1,500 yeshiva students.
- Service routes: the army and civil service will develop designated routes to accommodate the large number of male Israeli Jewish Haredi recruits.
- Community and institutional responsibility: heavy fines and sanctions would be imposed on yeshivas at which large numbers of draft dodgers attend.

=== Proposed sanctions on individual haredi draft dodgers ===
- An immediate fine of 7,500 NIS.
- An additional fine of 75 NIS for every day in which a draft dodger failed to report for military service.
- Cancellation of the individual's yeshiva allowance and of the individual's special income support scholarship which is granted to yeshiva students.
- Cancellation of the individual's yeshiva student status at the National Insurance Institute.
- Eliminating the individual's eligibility for state support for housing and mortgages.
- Eliminating the individual's eligibility for a discount on property tax.
- A yeshiva which would have more than a quarter of its students absent would stop receiving support payments, and if at the next check up it would be the same that yeshiva would be closed.
- Ministry of Education would visit yeshivas, and if any of the 1,500 selected yeshiva students would be missing from the school, it would be fined 50,000 NIS.
