= Tal Committee =

The Tal Committee was an Israeli public committee appointed on 22 August 1999 which dealt with the issue of Haredi conscription in Israel, where Haredi Jews had special exemption from mandatory military service in the Israel Defense Forces (IDF), which had been the status quo since independence, as well as extending mandatory military service to Israeli-Arabs. The committee was appointed by Prime Minister Ehud Barak and was initially headed by former Supreme Court Justice Tzvi Tal. The committee was later headed by Yohanan Plesner before its official dissolution on 2 July 2012, two days before submitting its report, hence the term Plesner Committee.

Based on the committee recommendations, on 23 July 2002 the Knesset passed the temporary Tal Law, which expired after five years and was renewed. The law authorises a continuation of the exemption to yeshiva students subject to the conditions within the law. According to the law, at the age of 22, yeshiva students have a "decision year" and can choose between one-year civilian national service alongside a paying job or a shortened 16-month military service and future service in the reserves as an alternative to continuing to study.

Five motions against the law were filed with the High Court of Justice claiming it violated the principle of equality. In 2005, the state admitted, in a response to a Supreme Court petition, that the Tal Law had failed to change enlistment arrangements for ultra-Orthodox Jews, as only a few dozen had enlisted in the army as a result. The law was then extended in 2007 for another five years. On 21 February 2012, the High Court ruled that the law is unconstitutional.

== History ==
Although yeshiva students were not technically exempt from military service, their enlistment was annually postponed until they received an age or parental exemption. This situation, while in practice from the early days of Israel, was viewed by many as undemocratic, unjust and unequal. Unlike other exemptions from military service given to some groups in Israel (Bedouin, Arabs, and others), it was based on a ministerial order and not specified in the law.

In 1974 only 2.4% of the soldiers eligible for military service were exempt based on the Haredi consciption exemption principle of Torato Umanuto. This number reached 9.2% in 1999, when it was anticipated that this percentage will reach up to 15% by the year 2012. By comparison, in the year 2025 the orthodox sector in Israel is expected to reach 12.4% of the total population, whereas the children of this sector would reach 22.4%. In 1999 there were 30,414 exempted yeshiva students, and by 2005 the number grew to 41,450. To be recognized as an exempt yeshiva student one must meet two conditions: dedicate one's whole time for the purpose of studying Torah in a recognized yeshiva institute, and not be employed in any work in which salary would be provided. The Finance Ministry of Israel presented data which indicates an unreasonable rise in the number of exempt young men. According to that data the number of the students grew 237% between the years 1985–1998, while the number of young men growth at the same period was 354%. This disproportional increase, creating an economical and a security burden on the other sectors of the Israeli population, led to an appeal to the Israeli Supreme Court.

The Tal committee was appointed after the Supreme Court determined that the minister of defense had no authority to determine the extent of the exemption from army service given to ultra-Orthodox yeshiva students. The ruling also elaborated on the need for a legislative solution, dealing with all aspects of the issue. Other committees before the Tal committee had tried to resolve the matter, including the Cohen committee and the Israeli committee.

== Members ==
The committee was chaired by former Supreme Court Justice Tzvi Tal, and its members were Cabinet Secretary Isaac Herzog, attorney Jacob Weinroth, Deputy Director General of the Ministry of Defense Haim Israeli, Secretary of the Committee for Yeshivot in Eretz Yisrael Rabbi Asher Tenenboim, former head of the IDF's Manpower Directorate Moshe Nativ, Mayor of Hadera and former Police Major General Israel Sadan, deputy legal advisor to the defense system Rachel Stuvitzky, Mayor of Bnei Brak Rabbi Mordechai Kerlitz, and Deputy Attorney General Yehoshua Shufman.

== Goals ==
The goals of the committee as they were declared when it was appointed were:

1. To recommend the appropriate way in the legislation which would entitle the defense minister to provide exemptions or postponements from army service.
2. The exemption or postponement should be applied without a limitation of the number of yeshiva students, because there was no intention to prevent them from continuing their studies.
3. To look into the development of possible alternative frameworks for ultra-Orthodox citizens and recommend how the defense minister should act in this regard. Discussed were the possibility of lowering the age of exemption from military service, minimal military training, and relevant training for ultra-Orthodox citizens choosing to integrate into the job market, taking into consideration the possibilities and needs of the IDF.

Goals which the committee itself formulated:

1. The committee saw its main point in finding a proper agreement.
2. Finding a solution which would be practical and not theoretical.
3. Creating a way to prevent the alienation and the social distance of the ultra-Orthodox population in Israel from the other Israeli population groups.

== Tal Law ==
In April 2000 the committee presented its report, which served as a basis for the legislation of the Deferral of Military Service for Yeshiva Students Law, also called the Tal Law on March 7, 2001. On July 23, 2002, the Tal Law in an expanded and updated version was passed in the Knesset by a majority of 51 to 41. It was a temporary law, to be renewed every five years. The law enabled a continuation of the exemptions to yeshiva students subject to certain conditions. Yeshiva students had the option to defer their military service until the age of 22. When they reached that age, they had a “decision year” in which they could perform a year of vocational training and then decide whether to join the army for a minimum of 16 months followed by annual reserve duty, or to perform a year of unpaid civilian national service if they decided not to continue to study full-time. In addition, the law also provided for the IDF's Orthodox units to be expanded, such as the Orthodox Nahal units. It also recommended that those included in the arrangement be carefully supervised and checked while enforcing the set conditions. The leadership of the yeshivas were required to cooperate on these matters. After the law was passed, the Movement for Quality Government submitted a petition to the High Court, seeking an annulment of the law. The law was also to affect recruitment within the Arab population and was later reported to have been supported by the de facto leader of the Lithuanian and all non-Hasidic Haredim Rabbi Aharon Leib Shteinman.

This rumor was denied vehemently by Rabbi Shteinman himself. R. Don Segal inquired about this rumor in a letter. To which R. Shteinman responded "Since you have heard a widespread and continued report suggesting that I am in support of the idea of Nachal Charedi, that bochurim who are weak in Torah study or in Yiras Shomayim will benefit from being there. Understandably, such a thought would never enter my mind at all. What was discussed in the beginning was that bochurim who are mechallelei Shabbos and actually committing other grave transgressions for which the punishment is kareis. And the father wants to save the boy and to save the [people in the] street from harm that we do not have the power to prevent. But for sure it is an unforgivable sin for anyone to persuade or entice in any possible way cause anyone who is not a mechallel Shabbos or committing other chayavei kerisos to go to the Nacahal Charedi."

In July 2005, three years after the law took effect, the state admitted in a response to a petition to the Supreme Court that the law had failed to change enlistments for Orthodox Jews as only a few dozen had enlisted in the army as a result of the law. Tzvi Tal responded that the state had done nothing to enforce the law. Also, state representatives announced that propositions planned for enforcement, mainly optional exchange of national service for army service for Orthodox Jews, were not implemented. The minister of justice detailed the omissions of the Tal Law in the letter to the Israeli prime minister.

On May 11, 2006, the Supreme Court determined that the Tal Law conflicted with the human dignity of those who serve in the Israeli Army and that the law was implemented in a vague way that did not constitute a "worthy purpose" that would justify damage to rights of those who serve. However, the court determined that the law should be left untouched for an additional year and a half to see if its application would improve. Two judges held a minority opinion. Judge Mishael Cheshin determined that the law was illegitimate from its foundation, and completely contradicted the values of Israel as a Jewish democratic state, and Judge Asher Grunis said that the Court shouldn't interfere with Knesset decisions unless they damage rights of minorities, whereas in this case the damaged part is the majority, which must take care of its own rights.

On July 18, 2007 the Knesset decided to extend the Tal Law for another five years, to August 2012. The Movement for Quality Government petitioned the High Court again. Paradoxically, the petition promoted the law's implementation, as the state tried to prove that it does encourage military or civilian national service. But according to the data submitted to the Court, only a few more ultra-Orthodox men served in the IDF.

=== 2012 extension debate ===
In January 2012, a mock military camp was erected in Tel Aviv to protest against the Tal Law.

On 21 February 2012, the High Court ruled that the Tal Law was unconstitutional by 6 votes to 3. Outgoing High Court President Dorit Beinisch who supported the ruling wrote in her opinion that “apart from a certain improvement in the implementation of the law, one cannot say that the law’s means achieved their goals, and it seems that certain blocs influence its potential to be fully fulfilled. That being the case, one cannot but determine that the law is unconstitutional... Originally the legislation harboured the hope that the law would launch a social process that without coercion would encourage ultra-Orthodox people to serve in the military or take part in civilian national service. These hopes were dashed.” In a minority opinion, incoming president Asher Grunis who was among those who opposed the ruling said that “it would have been best if the court didn’t have to deal with the issue; if it had been left in the public sphere beyond the court’s jurisdiction.” In his opinion, “the fact that this court dealt again and again with the issue of Haredi military service, without any progress being made as a result of the court’s ruling, does not add much to the standing of the High Court.” The court argued that the Law had failed to encourage Haredim to serve in the military or take part in civilian national service (Sherut Leumi) without coercion. Defense Minister Ehud Barak welcomed the ruling; in the past he had expressed the view that only 2,000 to 3,000 Torah experts should be granted exemption. Shas and United Torah Judaism, two Haredi political parties, issued a joint statement rejecting any discussion of changes to the status of the tens of thousands of Haredi yeshiva students who do not serve in the army or perform civilian national service. Prime minister Benjamin Netanyahu said that the government would formulate a new bill that would guarantee a more equal sharing of the burden by all parts of Israeli society. The system in place since 2002 was regarded as unfair by secular Jews, but there was no obvious alternative.

The Movement for Quality Government and Meretz, which had submitted the petition to the High Court, welcomed the decision, as well as many Members of Knesset, among them Kadima's Tzipi Livni, Shaul Mofaz, and Yohanan Plesner, and Likud's Tzipi Hotovely. Plesner was tasked with heading the committee.

Prime Minister Benjamin Netanyahu announced that he “will formulate a new bill that would guarantee a more equal sharing of the burden of all parts of Israeli society.” Defense Minister Ehud Barak also stated that a new law has to be passed so that all citizens equally share society's burdens. Interior Minister Eli Yishai said that “together with the Defense and Justice ministries, we will come up with a new law to regulate the status of the yeshiva students, whose contribution to the Jewish people and the State of Israel is obvious to any Jewish believer”. Foreign Minister Avigdor Lieberman had expressed his objections to extending the Tal Law before the High Court ruling.

== Dissolution and report ==
On 2 July, Netanyahu dissolved the committee following the resignation of former Yisrael Beiteinu and Habayit Hayehudi representative Jacob Weinroth. An aide to Kadima leader Shaul Mofaz said that there was no need for the prime minister to meet the deputy prime minister to discuss the dissolution as "Netanyahu made up his mind and there is no point in discussing it after the fact," following his claim that he would convene a meeting of the leaders of the ruling coalition party members "in order to draft a proposal that would garner a majority in the Knesset." The aide then also said that "the prime minister knows Kadima's position, and the only reason for calling the meeting is to discuss the framework of the Plesner Committee and its recommendations, including issuing personal sanctions against those who refuse to serve in the IDF." After having carried out the dissolution, an unnamed member of the committee told Ynet that he was "very disappointed by Prime Minister Benjamin Netanyahu's decision to dissolve the committee. We missed a historic opportunity to ease the tensions surrounding one of the most heated disputes in Israeli society." It was also followed by controversy and a threat by Mofaz to have Kadima leave the coalition that it recently joined over the issue itself. The move was also criticised as done to placate the two Haredi parties, avoid a new election and incur the wrath of the Arab-Israeli public.

Two days later, the committee issued its report that called for conscripting the Haredi. Netanyahu's met with Kadima leader Shaul Mofaz and other political leaders in regards to the issue. Likud parliamentary leader Ze'ev Elkin said that the differences between the governing coalition's two main parties was not big and could be bridged as neither party were opposed to the imposition of personal sanctions on whoever would not take part in national military service. Netanyahu also said that if no agreement was reached by 1 August, the law would be applied universally. If no accord is found it was further speculated that the two Haredi parties, United Torah Judaism and Shas, would leave the government and a new election would be called. Upon issue of the report, Plesner said that his "committee met for hundreds of hours, held dozens of meetings, heard dozens of experts, performed exhaustive staff work… in an effort to produce the most comprehensive work on this subject in Israel's history. We have every intention of releasing our findings. [This could] lead to a fundamental change in Israeli society by creating a new social treaty that will see more sectors on Israeli society shoulder the burden of service. We do not wish to trample on any sector's rights. We aim to foster a historic change and create a more cohesive, united society." It also suggested that within four years 80% of yeshiva students who were eligible for conscription would carry out their service. Ynet highlighted the committee's findings as including:

1. Imposing the principle of universal service on all Israeli citizens.
2. Imposing individual liability on anyone trying to evade the service.
3. Offering those serving in the IDF incentives and increased compensation.
4. Formulating an effective enforcement system against those violating draft directives.
5. Mandating the draft of ultra-Orthodox men.
6. Applying the principle of universal service to the Arab sector via National Service opportunities.

=== Reactions ===
Shas leader and Interior Minister Eli Yishai said that following the High Court's declaration of the “unconstitutional” Tal Law he would "submit a Tal Law substitute for second and third readings before the end of the Knesset summer session. I will oppose any form of sanctions against Yeshiva students who refuse to be drafted." Mofaz said Netanyahu should be given more time to resolve the issue. Netanyahu's office issued a statement in reaction to the report that read: "The draft dodger will not get the same reception as the service member." He also said that a bill to be presented to the Knesset at the end of the month "will be hard for Haredim." He also said of the report's issuance that "we are moving in the right direction. The haredim must be integrated in military service and both haredim and Arab-Israelis must be integrated in civil service." However, Kadima was reportedly still disappointed over his reaction. Netanyahu also announced that two new teams would be set up, but Mofaz rejected the moves and insisted that the recommendations of the Plesner Committee be adopted, causing a rift in Likud-Kadima relations.

However, Haaretz read this in saying that "hardness is subjective," and that "in the end, everything is political. But beyond politics there is also substance. The report...is the most thorough, serious and genuine document ever written on the issue of Haredim who avoid military service, the product of long months of work that began before the committee was even appointed. It does historic justice and ends decades of infuriating and outrageous discrimination between 'blood and blood.' This is undoubtedly Plesner's finest hour. It could also be Netanyahu's. An op-ed in the Jerusalem Post also defended Plesner's recommendations in saying that a "majority will be drawn out of hiding." The New York Times asked about the issue as an emblematic of a conflict within Israeli society. It said that the "debate over these details masks a more fundamental and fractious one about evolving identity in this still-young state, where a 'people’s army' has long been a defining principle, and about the growing cleavage among its tribes."

On 17 May, thousands of ultra-orthodox Jews protested against the implementation of the law.

=== Other issues ===
As a result of the uncertainty over the expiry of the law on 1 August 2012, Haaretz also cited a "record number" of Haredim volunteers. As the Camp Sucker Movement gained progress, tens of thousands of protestors attended rallies in support of universal service for Haredim and Israeli-Arabs in early July. Protestors include IDF reservists, disabled veterans, social activists and politicians. According to the Times of Israel, the rally drew 50,000 people.

The IDF also published statistics in August 2012 that showed over a third of reservists are West Bank settlers.

== See also ==
- Religion in Israel
- Status quo (Israel)
- Torah study
- Hesder - combining the Torah study practice and military service.
- Netzah Yehuda Battalion
- 2013 Israeli protests
