= Israel Democracy Institute =

Research center dedicated to strengthening Israeli democracy

- המכון הישראלי לדמוקרטיה
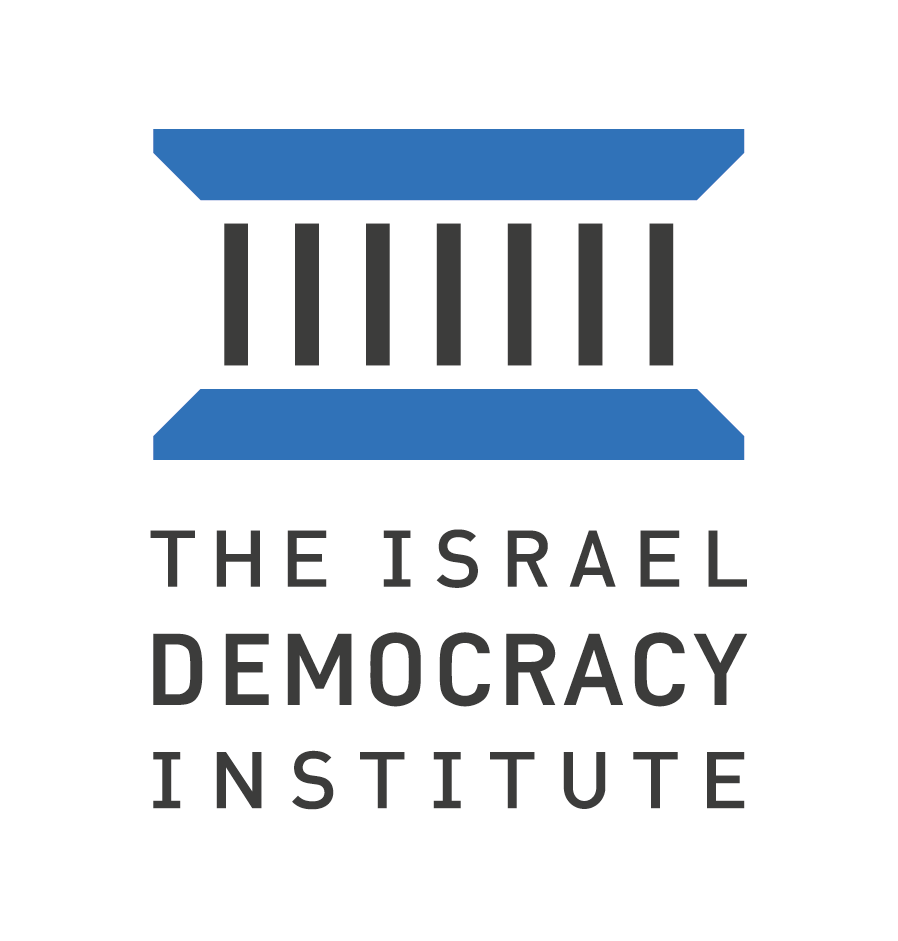
- Formation: 1991; 35 years ago
- Founder: Arye Carmon
- Legal status: nonprofit organization
- Headquarters: Jerusalem, Israel
- President: Yohanan Plesner
- Website: en.idi.org.il

The Israel Democracy Institute (IDI; Hebrew: המכון הישראלי לדמוקרטיה), established in 1991, is an independent research center that defines itself as being dedicated to strengthening the foundations of Israeli democracy. It is based in Jerusalem.

== History ==
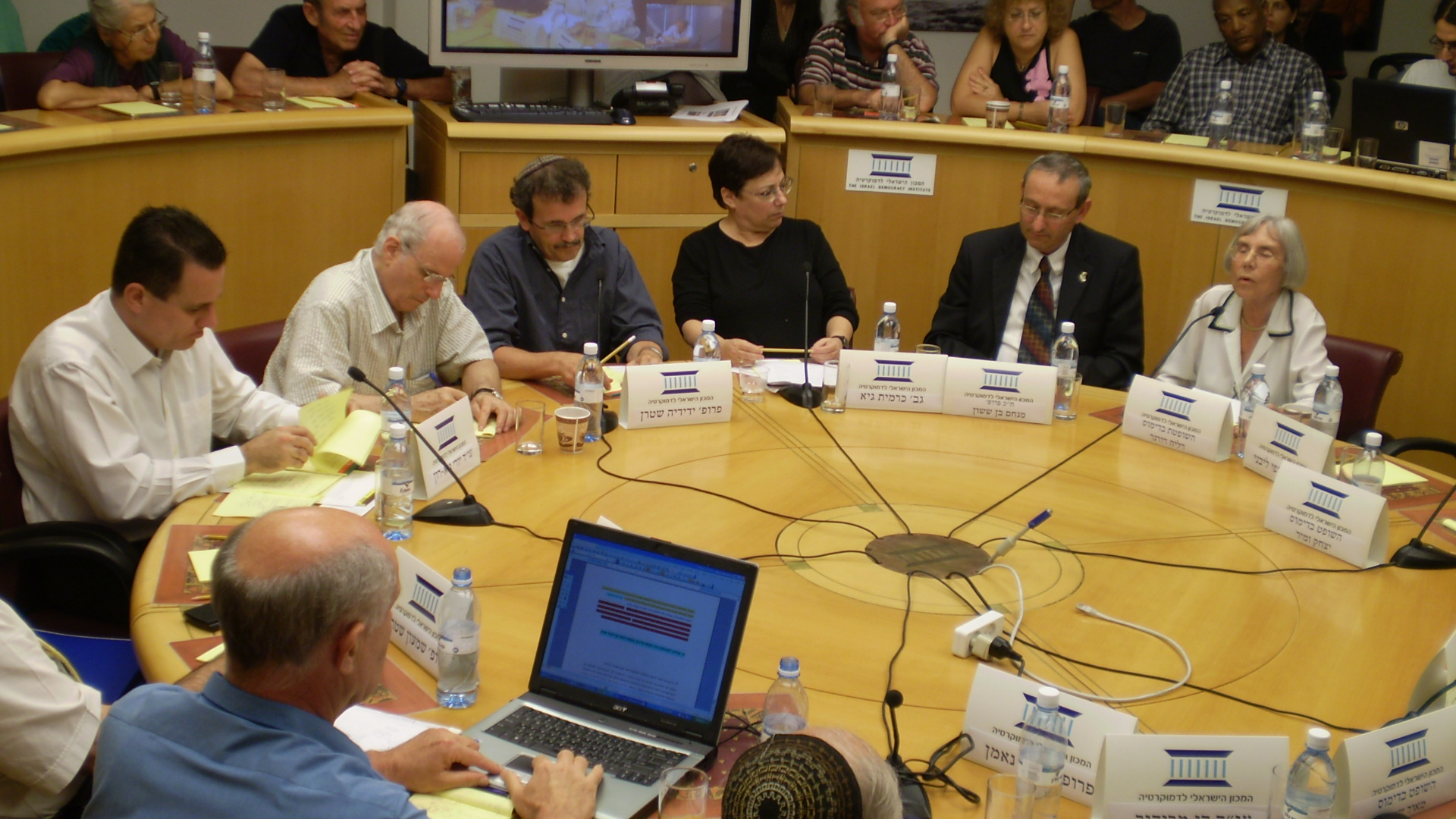
Round table discussion, Israel Democracy Institute

The Israel Democracy Institute (IDI) was founded in 1991 as a "center of research and action dedicated to strengthening the foundations of Israeli democracy." Haaretz described IDI as a "pro-democracy think tank," while the IDI has traditionally coined itself as a "do tank". The IDI is generally portrayed as the leftist counterweight to the Kohelet Policy Forum.

The IDI received funding from Bernard Marcus.

IDI's offices are located in Jerusalem.

== Activities ==
In November 2022, the IDI began a public campaign about the Israeli judicial reform. Karnit Flug, the institute's vice president of research, was one of the first authoritative voices warning about the reform's potential impact on the Israeli economy.

It aims to bolster the values and institutions of Israel as a Jewish and democratic state. The non-partisan think tank was awarded the Israel Prize for by the State of Israel.

In 2014, Yohanan Plesner was appointed president. In 2018, their vice president of research Yuval Shany was chosen to head the United Nations Human Rights Committee.

Until 2015, the IDI published HaAyin HaShevi'it (The Seventh Eye).

== Award and ranking ==
In 2009, IDI was awarded the Israel Prize for its "lifetime achievement and special contribution to society and the State of Israel.

In the University of Pennsylvania's 2014 Global Go To Think Tanks Report, it was ranked the 23rd best think tank in the Middle East and North Africa.

== See also ==
- List of Israel Prize recipients
