= Kollel =

Institute for full-time, advanced study of the Talmud and rabbinic literature

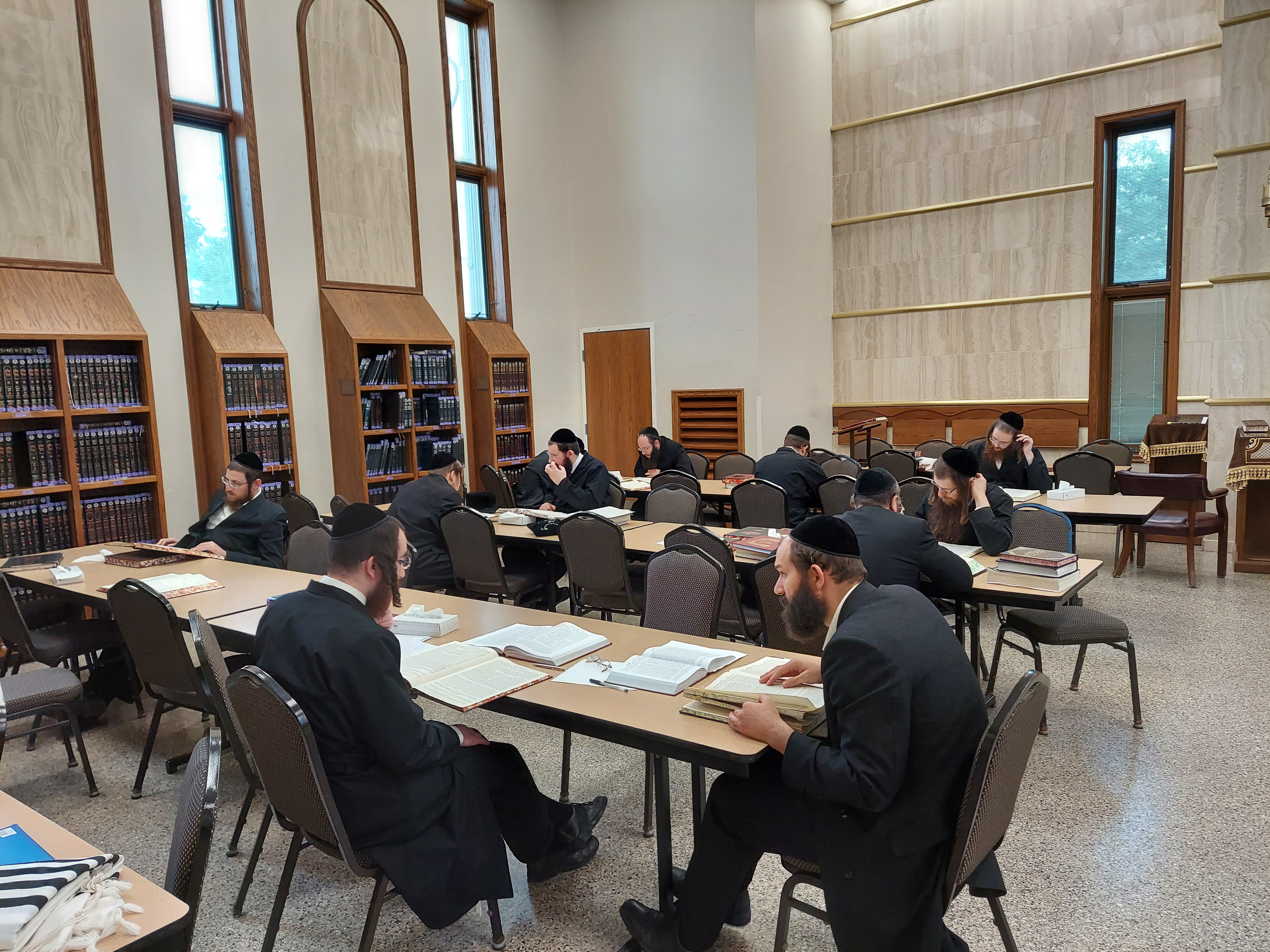
Chicago Chassidishe Kollel

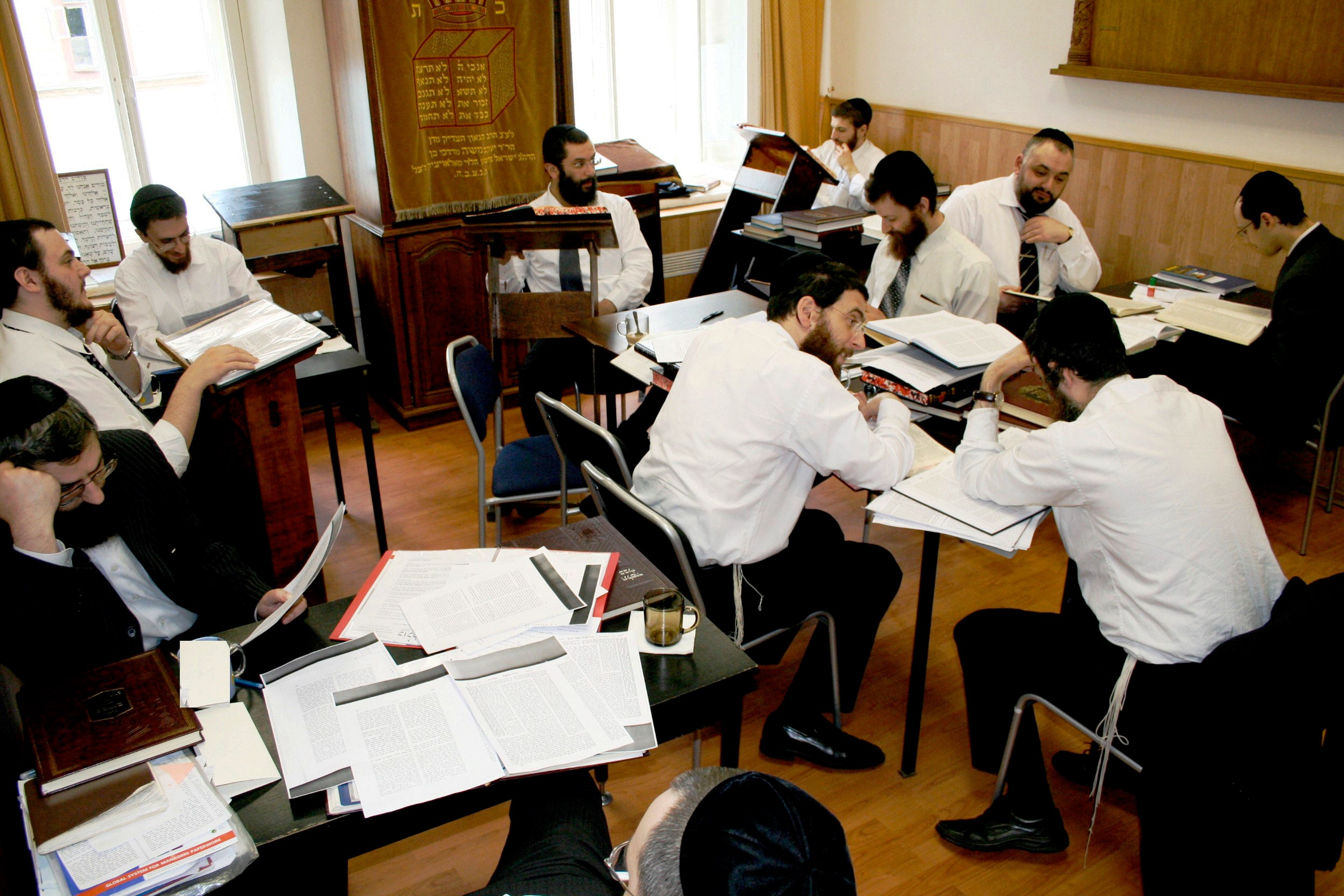
Kollel Birkat Yitzchak in Moscow

A kollel (also kolel; Hebrew: כּוֹלֵל, kólel, pl. כּוֹלְלִים, kolelím, a "gathering" or "collection" [of scholars]) is an institute for full-time, advanced study of the Talmud and rabbinic literature. Like a yeshiva, a kollel features shiurim (lectures) and learning sedarim (sessions); unlike most yeshivot, the student body of a kollel typically consists mostly of married men. A kollel generally pays a regular monthly stipend to its members.

== History ==
=== Original sense ===
Originally, the word was used in the sense of "community". Each group of European Jews settling in Israel established their own community with their own support system. Each community was referred to as the "kollel of [place-name]" to identify the specific community of the Old Yishuv. The overwhelming majority of these Jews were scholars who left their birth countries to devote themselves to study Torah and serve God for the rest of their lives. The kollel was the umbrella organization for all their needs.

The first examples were Kolel Perushim (students of the Vilna Gaon who established the first Ashkenazi Jewish settlement in Jerusalem) and Colel Chabad for the Russian Hasidim. The Polish Jews were divided into many kollelim: Kolel Polen (Poland), headed by Rabbi Chaim Elozor Wax; Kolel Vilna Zamość was under different leadership; and the Galicians were incorporated under Kolel Chibas Yerushalayim. The last initially included the entire Austro-Hungarian Kingdom, but as each subparty looking for more courteous distribution, the Hungarians separated into Kolel Shomrei HaChomos.

=== Modern sense ===
The first kollel – in the modern sense of the term – in the Jewish diaspora was the Kovno Kollel ("Kolel Perushim") founded in Kovno (Kaunas, Lithuania) in 1877. It was founded by Rabbi Yisrael Salanter and directed by Rabbi Isaac Blaser. The ten students enrolled were required to separate from their families, except for the Sabbath, and devote themselves to studying for the Rabbinate. There was a four-year limit on one's membership in the kollel.

Two people can be considered to have spearheaded the kollel philosophy and outgrowth in today's world: Rabbi Aharon Kotler (founder of Beth Medrash Govoha, Lakewood, New Jersey, the largest yeshiva in the US) and Rabbi Elazar Shach, one of the most prominent leaders of the Jewish community in Israel until his death in 2001. The community kollel movement was also fostered by Torah Umesorah, the National Society for Hebrew Day Schools.

Currently, the term is applied in America to any stipend given for yeshiva study and is now a general term for the yeshivah approach to life.

== Philosophy ==
The philosophy of the kollel, in which members are subsisting on support from others, is part of an overall philosophy of some Orthodox Jews, that God desires that the children of Israel primarily occupy themselves in this world with the study of the Torah, and gave certain Jews more of a propensity to work with the intention that they should support the 'learners'. In Orthodox Judaism this has become known as the 'Yissachar-Zebulun' partnership, after the Midrashic legend that the tribe of Zevulun financially supported the tribe of Issachar so that they could occupy themselves with Torah study. The reward of the supporter in the World-to-Come is seen to be equal to that of the scholar's reward.

== Structure ==
=== Leadership ===
Most kollels have a scholar serving as a rosh kollel, or head of the kollel. He decides on the subject matter studied by the kollel. In many cases he also has to spend considerable time fund-raising to support the kollel.

Many kollels employ former students – avrechim (אברכים), sg. avrech (אברך) – as fundraisers, often giving them titles such as Executive Director or Director of Community Programming. Fundraising projects may include sponsorships of specific events or "day(s) of learning".

=== Student body ===
Many Orthodox Jewish yeshiva students study in kollel for a year or two after they get married, whether or not they will pursue a rabbinic career. Modest stipends, or the salaries of their working wives, and the increased wealth of many families have made kollel study commonplace for yeshiva graduates. The largest United States kollel is at Beth Medrash Govoha in Lakewood, New Jersey. More than 4,500 kollel scholars are attached to the yeshiva, which has 6500 students in total. Large kollels also exist in Ner Israel Rabbinical College, numbering 180 scholars, and in Yeshiva Rabbi Chaim Berlin, with more than 100 scholars. In the Israeli Haredi Jewish community, thousands of men study full-time for many years in hundreds of kollelim.

Kollel has been known at times to cause a great deal of friction with the secular Israeli public at large. It has been criticized by the Modern Orthodox, non-Orthodox, and secular Jewish communities. The Haredi community defends the practice of kollel on the grounds that Judaism must cultivate Torah scholarship in the same way that the secular academic world conducts research into subject areas. While costs may be high in the short run, in the long run the Jewish people will benefit from having numerous learned laymen, scholars, and rabbis. (See also: Religious relations in Israel)

Yeshiva students who learn in kollel often continue their studies and become rabbis, poskim ("deciders" of Jewish law), or teachers of Talmud and Judaism. Others enter the world of business. If successful, they may financially support the study of others while making time to continue their own learning.

== Community kollelim ==
In the late 20th century, community kollelim were introduced. They are an Orthodox outreach tool, aimed to decrease assimilation and propagate Orthodox Judaism among the wider Jewish population. In the early 1990s community kollelim (or kollels) in North America were functioning in Los Angeles, Toronto, and Detroit; a kollel was also established in Montreal. Other locations with community kollelim include Atlanta, Dallas, Jacksonville, Las Vegas, Miami Beach, Minneapolis, Pittsburgh, Philadelphia, Phoenix, St. Louis, and Seattle.

In the past years about 30 Haredi community kollelim in North America have been opened by yeshiva-trained scholars to serve, in addition to the full-time study by the members of the kollel, as centers for adult education and outreach to the Jewish communities in which they located themselves. Topics include everything from basic Hebrew to advanced Talmud. In addition to imparting Torah knowledge, such kollels function to impart technical skills required for self-study.

Many Modern Orthodox communities host a Torah MiTzion kollel, where Hesder graduates learn and teach, generally for one year.

In recent years there have been established a number of Chassidishe Kollelim as well, such as the Chicago Chassidishe Kollel, the Los Angeles Kollel Yechiel Yehudah, and others. Unlike most community Kollelim that primarily focus on in depth Talmud study, Chassidishe Kollelim usually focus more on the study of Shulchan Aruch and poskim, including tests on the material by leading Poskim.

== Criticism ==
Maimonides in his code of Jewish law, is very critical of those that study Torah without having a source of income and rely on charity, to the extent that he calls it a disgrace to God and to the Torah.

However, the kollel system is both a popular and accepted one in many Orthodox Jewish circles, yet some maintain that a distinction must be made between a situation of mutual desire for such by both the learner and the supporter and, on the other hand, communities that put pressure on the learner to join and remain in a kollel while simultaneously putting pressure on the community to support such an individual.

Some other criticisms of the modern kollel system include:

- The difficult financial burden placed on individuals who are less than willing to support institutions for kollel studies.
- The complex halachic permissibility of receiving financial support for Torah study, while avoiding preparation for a future occupation.
- The community-wide poverty that often accompanies the system along with its effect on the larger economy.
- The convention of isolation from daily life, social interactions and a career resulting in studies being divorced from actual day-to-day practice.
- The lack of standardized testing and regular supervision which allows for misuse of time intended for study.
- The focus on thorough examination of a relatively few number of pages of Talmud, as opposed to completion of the entire Talmud with a focus on practical halachah and other areas of Jewish literature.

== Sources ==
- The World of the Yeshiva: An Intimate Portrait of Orthodox Jewry William B. Helmreich, KTAV Publishing House; ISBN 0-88125-641-2; Augmented edition (February 2000)
- The way we were before our destruction: Lives of Jewish students from Vilna who perished during the Holocaust Yulian I. Rafes, VIA Press; YIVO Institute for Jewish Research; ISBN 1-885563-06-X; (July 1, 1998)
