= Haredi conscription in Israel =

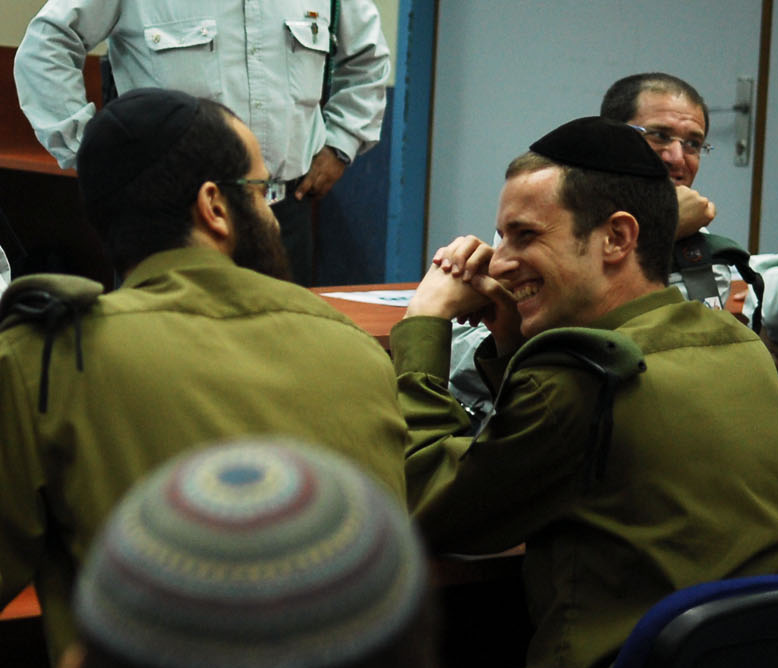
Haredi soldiers serving in the Israel Defense Forces

Since Israeli independence in 1948, most Haredi Jews (also known as ultra-Orthodox Jews) in Israel have been exempt from military service under an arrangement based on the principle of Torato Umanuto, whereby young men who declare themselves full time yeshiva students and devote their lives to Torah study serve a shortened service or are exempted entirely. This arrangement lasted until 2014, when legislation was enacted with a timeline for eventual conscription. In 2024, widespread enforcement of conscription began amidst the ongoing Gaza war.

In response to conscription efforts, the Haredi community has staged large scale protests to maintain their exemption. The most widespread protests occurred in 2014 and 2024, after legislation on Haredi conscription.

Overall, the issue of Haredi conscription in Israel has remained highly contentious.

== Status ==
As the Israeli population has grown over the years, the number of Haredi men eligible for exemption has risen from 400 to tens of thousands in 2024. In 2022, an estimated 18.4% of Jewish men refused to serve, with the majority citing religious belief as the reason. As of 2026, the number of Haredi soldiers in the IDF remains low.

Israelis who belong to the Religious Zionist community are conscripted, often under the yeshiva system of the Hesder program, which combines Torah study with military service.

== History ==
=== Torato Umanuto exemption arrangement ===
"Tehillim neged Tilim" (Hebrew: תהילים נגד טילים, lit. 'Psalms against missiles'), a slogan initially coined during the Iraqi missile campaign against Israel in 1991. It has since gained widespread popularity among the Religious Zionist and the Haredi community.

During the 1948 Arab–Israeli War, Israeli prime minister David Ben-Gurion reached a special arrangement with Haredi representative Yitzhak-Meir Levin, who led the Haredi party Agudat Yisrael in Israel. The arrangement was based on the Jewish principle of Torato Umanuto, so that those in the Haredi community eligible for conscription would be exempt from service in the IDF as long as Torah study is their sole profession, which for many is a religious commandment that is devoted a majority of the day.

Haredi recruits training with rifles during the 1948 Arab–Israeli War.

The Haredi community maintains that studying Torah is crucial for defending the Israeli people from threats.

The Israeli government seeks to preserve the secular–religious status quo with the aim of maintaining national and political stability. This arrangement based on the principle of Torato Umanuto effectively became a regulation under the jurisdiction of the Ministry of Defense.

Following the Six-Day War, defense minister Moshe Dayan headed a committee to examine the issue of Haredi conscription based on a request from chief of staff Haim Bar-Lev, but decided on keeping the existing arrangement with 800 exemptions per year.

In 1970, a petition was filed with the Supreme Court of Israel regarding the exemptions, with the court upholding the existing arrangements.

In 1977, after the legislative election that year introduced the nation's first right-wing government, the quotas on Haredi exemptions were lifted completely following an agreement between Likud and Agudat Yisrael.

In 1981, the governing coalition expanded exemptions to include those besides students involved in Torah study including teachers, rabbis, and others.

In 1986, a petition to the Supreme Court was again filed on Haredi exemptions, with the court again upholding the arrangement. However, the court also determined that the petitioner had a right of standing, and that the number of exemptions is an important factor on this matter.

Also in 1986, the Knesset formed the Cohen Committee to examine Haredi exemption policy, and decided on an arrangement with more limitations on exemption. The recommendation was for the exemption arrangement to only apply to select schools, and that only 200 outstanding yeshiva students per year would receive full exemption, with the others conscripted for a shortened service of about a year.

=== Tal Law ===
In 1998, a petition was filed to the Supreme Court regarding the exemptions. The court ruled that due to the scale of exemptions, new legislation from the Knesset was needed to regulate this matter.

In 1999, in accordance with the judicial ruling, Prime Minister Ehud Barak set up a public committee, which was headed by Justice Zvi Tal and therefore known as the Tal Committee. In April 2000, the committee reported its recommendations, which were approved by the Knesset in July 2002. This law became known as the "Tal Law", and provided for a continuation of the existing arrangement based on the principle of Torato Umanuto, but laid down several specific conditions into the law, in the hopes that exemptions would decrease over time. Under this legislation, yeshiva students who dedicate to Torah study full time can delay army service until the age of 23, and afterwards can either serve 16 months of military service (shortened from three years) or may also serve for a year of Sherut Leumi. Afterwards, they may then choose to join the workforce.

Around the same time, a new unit called the Netzah Yehuda Battalion was formed in 1999 as a place where Haredi men could participate in military service, which had 30 members at its founding.

Following the 2003 elections, the Haredi parties for a while were replaced by the secular anti-religious Shinui party in the new 30th government, which lasted until 2005 when Shinui left and the Haredi United Torah Judaism party returned to the ruling coalition. During its position in government, Shinui advocated for ending extra funding to mostly Haredi schools and considered to Tal Law, which gives legal status exemptions from Haredi conscription.

In 2005, Justice Minister Tzipi Livni stated that the Tal Law, which by then had yet to be fully implemented, did not provide an adequate solution to Haredi conscription. The legislation originally intended for Haredi students to leave the yeshivas with shortened military service and then join the workforce, but in reality most chose to continue Torah study in order to avoid military service. At the time, only 1,115 of the 41,450 yeshiva students covered by the arrangement had taken the "decision year" provided by the law, and of these only 31 had later enlisted in the IDF. In 2007, the Tal Law was extended until August 2012.

In January 2012, Defense Minister Ehud Barak said his ministry was preparing an alternative to the Tal Law. Dozens of IDF reserve soldiers had put up what they called "the suckers' camp" near the Tel Aviv Savidor Central railway station, to protest the possible extension of the Tal Law. Several politicians, public figures, disabled IDF veterans and high school and university students visited the protest encampment.

=== Conscription amendments ===
In February 2012, the Supreme Court ruled that the Tal Law in its current form was unconstitutional and could not be extended beyond August. In response, prime minister Benjamin Netanyahu pledged to formulate new legislation that would improve conscription equality. On 21 May, the Plesner Committee was created with the goal of creating a new Haredi conscription bill, and it submitted potential legislation by early July. However, the issue remained divisive and the 32nd government could not agree on a clear solution.

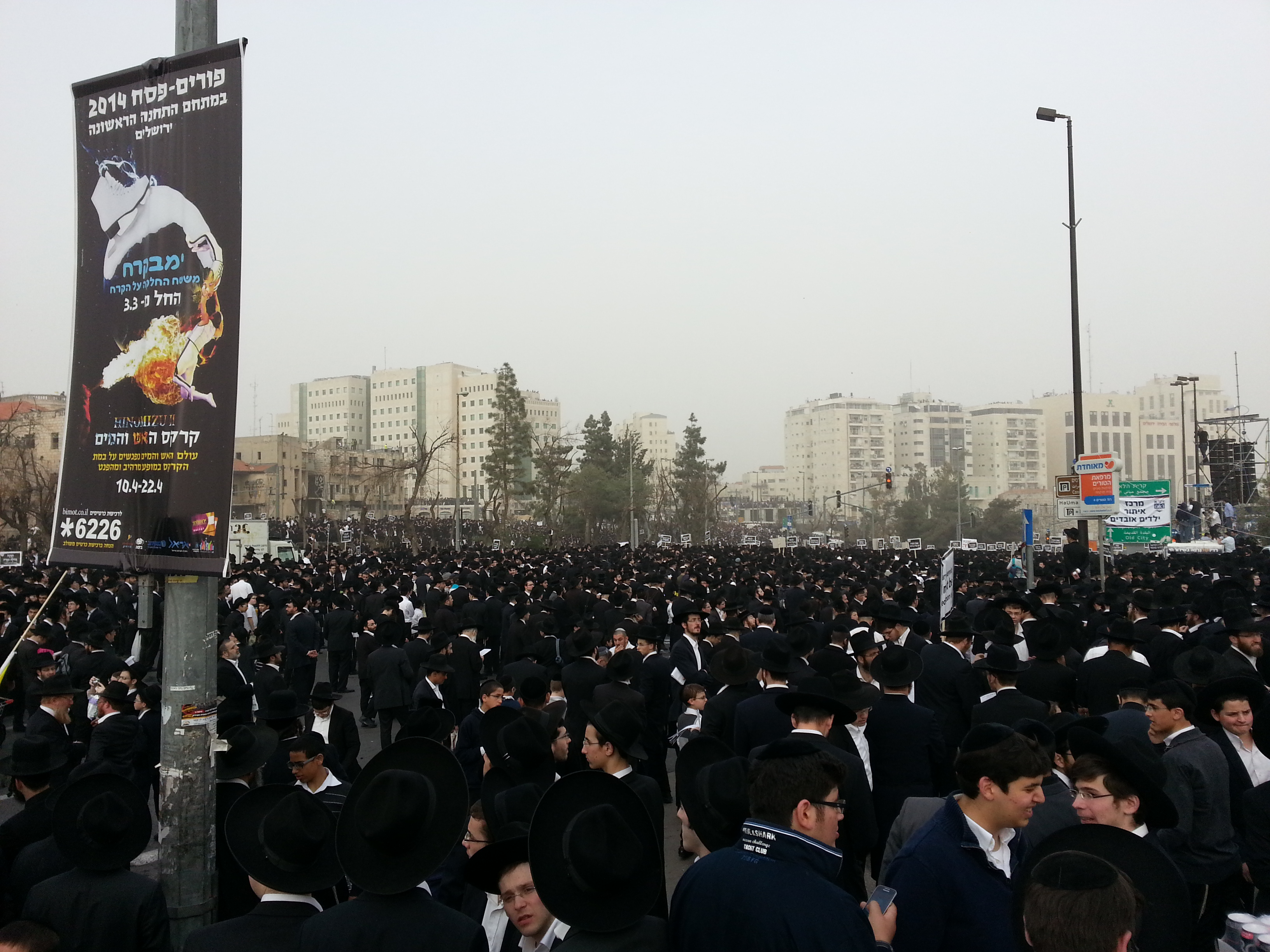
Anti-conscription demonstration in March 2014

After the 2013 election, the new 33rd government was formed in March 2013 without Haredi parties. By July, the government created the Shaked committee, headed by Ayelet Shaked of The Jewish Home, to write a conscription bill. In March 2014, the committee proposed a bill for increasing enlistment among those eligible in the Haredi community, leading to widespread protests.

On 12 March 2014, the bill passed the Knesset as an amendment to the Israeli Defense Service Law. Under the new law, the government would establish annual enlistment targets for the Haredim that would increase gradually until 2017. If the targets are met by 2017, then enlistment will remain voluntary. But if they are not met, then conscription will begin for most Haredi students, with the only exemptions being for a total of 1,800 standout students, who would be allowed to continue their yeshiva studies. This decision led to massive protests among the Haredim against conscription.

In November 2015, the Knesset under the 34th government passed an amendment that provided extensions for the enlistment plan passed in March 2014. Under the new amendment, the deadline for enlistment was pushed back from 2017 to 2020, and criminal sanctions for those not enlisted were also pushed back until 2023.

On 12 September 2017, the Supreme Court struck down both the 2014 and 2015 amendments, ruling that blanket military service exemptions for Haredi students were illegal and discriminatory. The court decided to terminate the amendments in a year to allow time for the Knesset to pass new legislation.

In February 2018, defense minister Avigdor Lieberman led a committee to draft a new conscription bill after the previous attempt was struck down. The bill passed first reading in July but did not advance to the next readings. The legislation would have set recruitment targets of 85%, and would force full enlistment if actual enlistment fell below target for three consecutive years. It also would have placed financial sanctions on religious institutions, but did not have personal sanctions against those who do not enlist.

In December 2018, the Supreme Court gave the government an extension for passing new legislation on Haredi conscription, but as the 20th Knesset dissolved without resolving the issue, the deadline was extended again to July 2019.

Following the April 2019 election, Israel underwent a period of political instability with several snap elections due to the inability to form or maintain a stable government.

In January 2022, the 24th Knesset under the 36th government voted on the first reading of a new legislation on conscription, but it did not pass due to opposition from MK Ghaida Rinawie Zoabi of Meretz.

Following the Knesset's dissolution in June 2022, the Supreme Court again gave an extension in the following month for the legislature to pass a conscription bill, with the deadline now set for July 2023.

On 25 June 2023, as the court extension for passing conscription legislation was set to expire, the 37th government passed a cabinet resolution that extended conscription exemptions until April 2024. By July, a petition was filed to the Supreme Court for conscripting Haredi students, with the court ruling to wait and provide some time for a government response.

=== Enforcement since 2024 ===
On 26 February 2024, the Supreme Court issued an interim order requiring a government explanation for the non-enlistment of yeshiva students by 31 March.

In March 2024, a draft was prepared for legislating Haredi conscription. This draft allowed continued exemption for those engaged in Torah study, but everyone else would be required to serve in either the IDF or in non-military roles such as in United Hatzalah or the Israel Police. For the first time, a Haredi conscription draft was recognized by the Haredi rabbis. However, chief rabbi Yitzhak Yosef remained opposed to this conscription draft.

Also in March 2024, Attorney General Gali Baharav-Miara instructed both the Education Ministry and the Defense Ministry to begin the drafting process for Haredi men.

On 1 April 2024, the Supreme Court decided that the Haredim would no longer receive an exemption from military service and that yeshivas could no longer receive the associated government subsidies. In response, the coalition government clarified that it had not agreed to an extension of the exemption, which had thus expired.

The Times of Israel reported that per government figures, 1,257 yeshivas would lose subsidies for 49,485 students receiving the exemption. Haredi lawmakers, members of the political parties United Torah Judaism and Shas, and supporters of the coalition government stated in April 2024 their intention to walk out if the exemption removal was enforced. Anshel Pfeffer, a journalist for the newspaper Haaretz, argued that these threats were hollow. Haredi youth in the ultra-Orthodox neighbourhood of Mea Shearim in Jerusalem burned Israeli flags and military uniforms in protest.

On May 15, 2024, prime minister Benjamin Netanyahu revived a conscription bill from the previous government and presented it to committee in the Knesset. On 10 June 2024, the bill passed first reading in the Knesset by a vote of 63 to 57 and was transferred to the Foreign Affairs and Defense Committee.

On 2 June 2024, the Supreme Court reconvened with an expanded nine-judge panel, to hear a case on Haredi conscription. On 25 June, the court agreed by unanimous decision that there was no longer a legal framework for blanket exemptions from conscription, and that the government was obligated to begin conscripting Haredi men into military service.

In response, officials from the ultra-Orthodox Shas party urged potential conscripts to ignore any call-ups from the IDF and to protest. During at least one June protest, protestors attacked both law enforcement and the vehicle of Minister Yitzhak Goldknopf.

In July 2024, the army issued draft notices for 3,000 Haredi men, but less than 10% showed up at recruitment centers. In November, 7,000 additional draft orders for Haredi men were approved, and military officials also issued 1,126 arrest warrants for Haredi conscripts who did not respond to drafting orders.

On 14 January 2025, defense minister Israel Katz presented a policy outline regarding Haredi conscription into the IDF, which included annual conscription targets that gradually increased to 50% by 2032. Failure to meet these targets would result in financial sanctions on educational institutions such as yeshivas. The plan preserves exemption for elite students in Torah study.

On 4 August 2025, outgoing Foreign Affairs and Defense Committee chair Yuli Edelstein publicized his proposed version of a revised Haredi conscription bill, which included full conscription for anyone not engaged in full time Torah study, along with implementing various penalties for draft evaders, including cancellation of drivers licenses and banning of international travel.

On 27 November 2025, the new Foreign Affairs and Defense Committee chairman Boaz Bismuth laid out another revised bill on Haredi conscription, which would conscript 50% of Haredi men who are not engaged in full time Torah study. This plan would allow for the conscription of an estimated 23,000 Haredim, out of a total of 80,000 Haredim currently eligible but exempt from military service.Speaking at the swearing-in of the 26th Knesset on 10 November 2026, President Isaac Herzog called for "joint responsibility for the duty of service" in regards to the conscription of the Haredi population.

== Anti-conscription protests ==
Anti-conscription protests
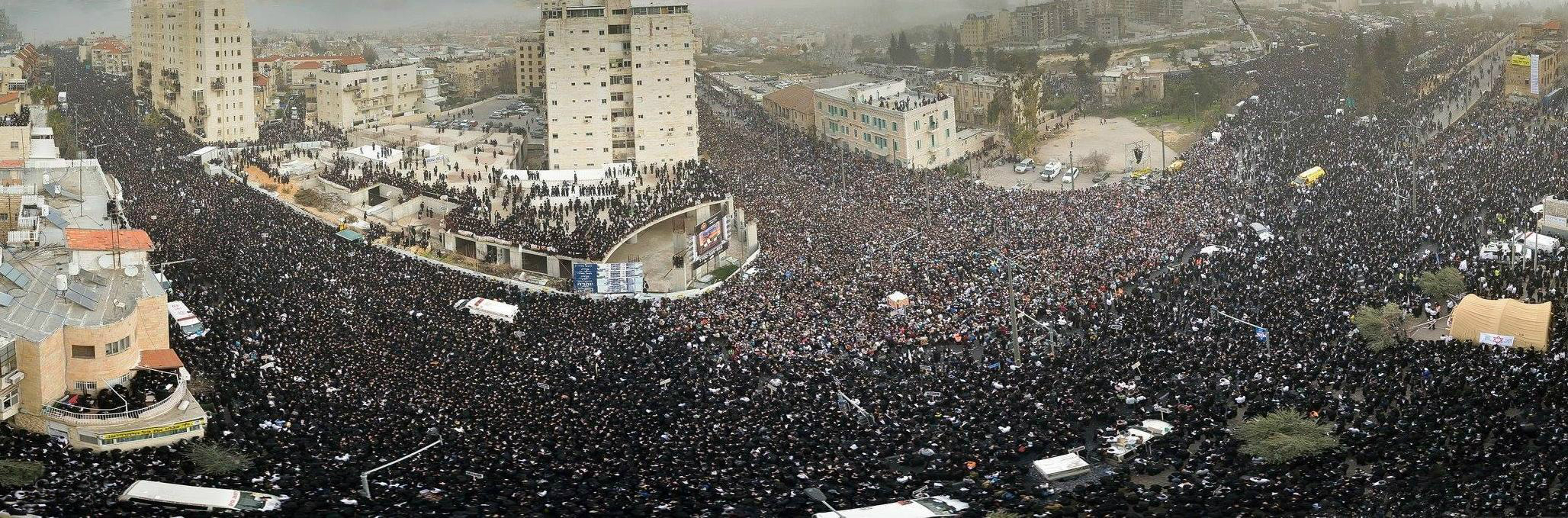
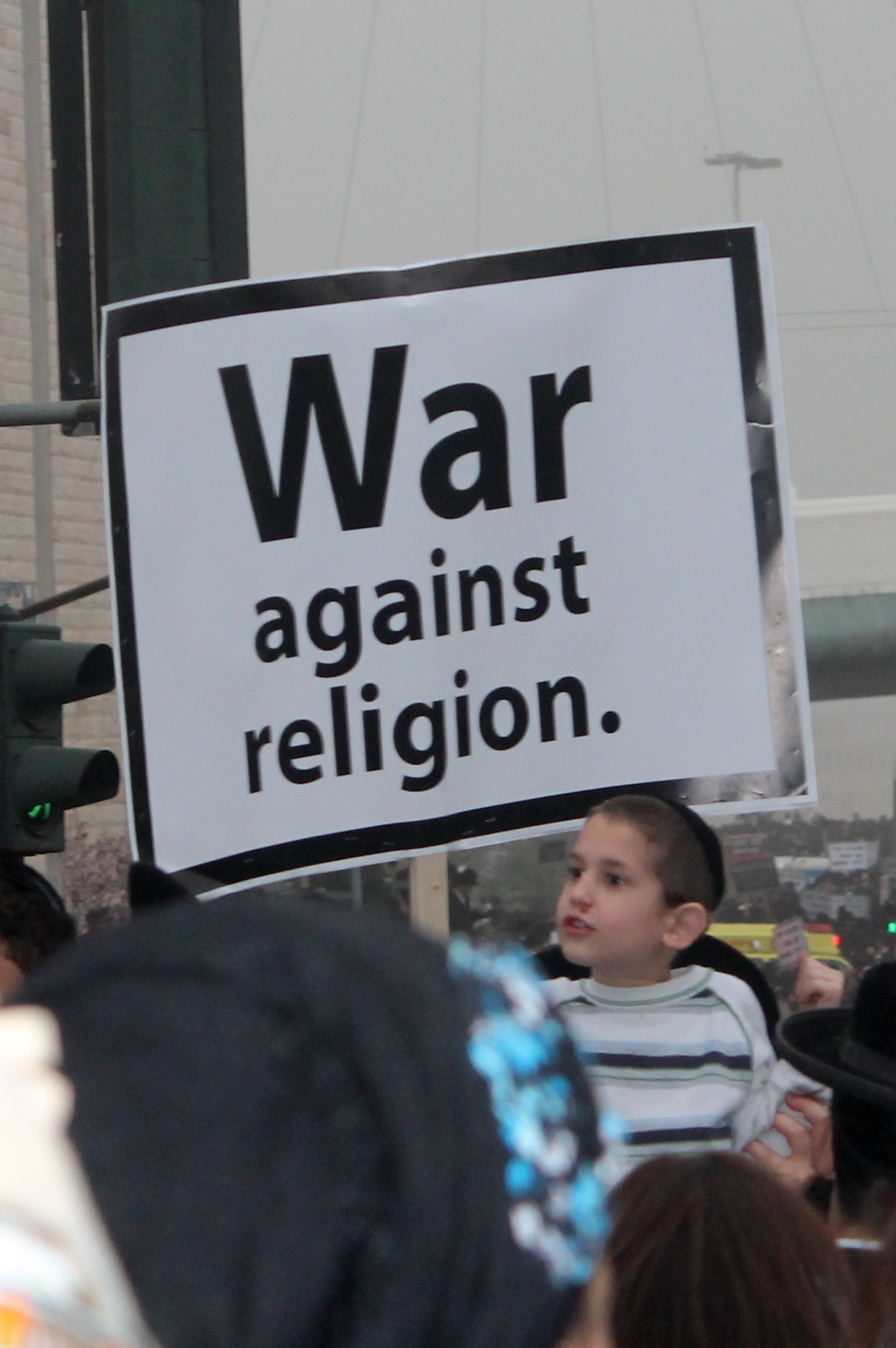
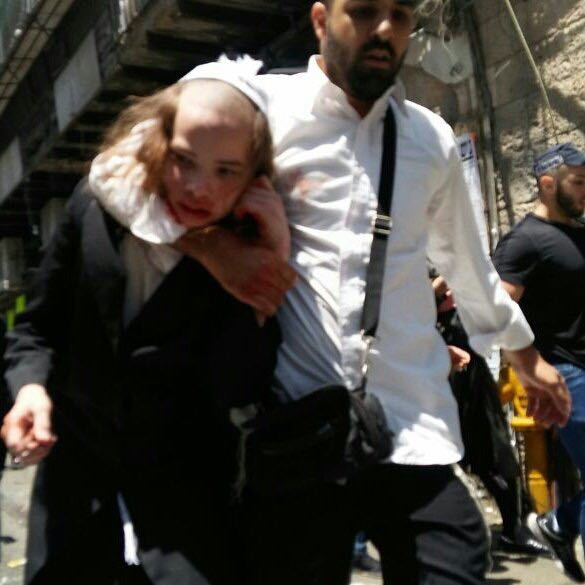
- Clockwise from top left: Anti-conscription demonstration in Jerusalem in March 2014, A Haredi child holding a protest sign, A teenager getting arrested at a protest
- Location: Israel, sometimes worldwide
- Caused by: Proposed conscription of Haredi Israelis into the IDF
- Goals: Maintain religious exemption from military service
- Methods: Protests, demonstrations, civil disobedience, civil resistance, online activism, riots
- Status: Active

Parties
Ultra-Orthodox movements: Jerusalem Faction; Edah HaChareidis; Moetzes Gedolei HaTorah; World Agudath Israel; Degel HaTorah; Moetzet Chachmei HaTorah; Shas	State authorities & enforcement: Supreme Court of Israel; Israeli Police; Israel Defense Forces

In response to demands for conscription, Haredi Israelis eligible for military service, mainly yeshiva students, staged several protests to express their desire to continue exemption from military service. Large anti-conscription protests have been held in Israel and worldwide. Three of these protests had more than 200,000 participants and were significant in the ultra-Orthodox community:

- The ultra-Orthodox demonstration against the Supreme Court (Hebrew: הפגנת החצי מיליון), 1999.
- The ultra-Orthodox demonstration against conscription of yeshiva students (Hebrew: עצרת המיליון), 2014
- The Haredis demonstration against conscription of yeshiva students (Hebrew: עצרת המיליון), 2025, in response to arrests of yeshiva students refusing conscription.

=== 2012 ===
Smaller protests against Haredi conscription began around 2012 with the meeting of the Plesner committee. The first of such protests was held in Kikar HaShabbat in Jerusalem, with thousands in attendance.

=== 2013 ===
In response to efforts by the new 33rd government to implement Haredi conscription, pamphlets were handed out in Haredi neighbourhoods in Jerusalem calling for demonstrations against conscription. On 16 May 2013, between 15,000 and 30,000 Haredi men demonstrated outside an IDF recruiting office in Jerusalem, with reports of some protesters throwing stones or bottles at the police. Haredi rabbis supported the protests, with Rabbi David Zycherman saying that conscription is an effort from the govenrment to "uproot and secularise" the community but that "you cannot change our [way of life]". Other protesters read out loud passages from the Torah to “annul the evil decree” of military service.

=== 2014 ===
On February 24, 2014, the leaders of Agudat Yisrael, Degel HaTorah, and Shas, including Rav Aharon Leib Shteinman, Rav Shmuel Auerbach, the Vizhnitzer Rebbe, and Rav Shalom Cohen, gathered for a conference in Bnei Brak and decided on a demonstration a week after the conference. All Haredi boys and men over age nine were summoned to attend. Rav Shteinman publicly encouraged attendance at the protest. He said that in the IDF, there is gilui arayot (sexual immorality), shefichut damim (bloodshed), and avodah zarah (idolatry), but greater than these three cardinal sins is the chillul hashem that a country calling itself the Jewish State should put quotas on Torah learning. Hundreds of thousands of protesters lined the streets surrounding the area, with Jaffa Road designated for women, despite unfavorable weather. Many leaders of the Haredi community, including the rabbis of Gur, Belz and Vizhnitz, Lithuanian rabbis Aharon Leib Shteinman, Chaim Kanievsky and Shmuel Auerbach, Sephardic rabbis Shalom Cohen and Shimon Desserts and other members of the Great Council of Torah and the Council of Torah Sages attended the rally. Members of the orthodox rabbinical community (including Yitzhak Tuvia Weiss, chief Rabbis David Lowe and Isaac Joseph, and Hasidic leaders, rabbis and public figures) were also in attendance. Small groups and religious Zionist rabbis, including Shmuel Eliyahu and Yaakov Shapira, were present.

Leading rabbis from the conservative wing of the national religious community (including Shmuel Eliyahu, Mordechai Sternberg, Micha Halevi, and Shlomo Aviner) supported the rally, and a group of nationalist Haredi rabbis issued a proclamation calling on the public to participate in the religious, Zionist rally. Other groups, such as the Tzohar and Beit Hillel rabbinical associations, and rabbis from the religious Zionist community (including Haim Druckman) opposed the protest. After harsh commentary by a Haredi newspaper about Religious Zionist leader Haim Druckman, Yehoshua Shapira (rabbi of the Ramat Gan yeshiva) and the Association of Community Rabbis (led by Chief Rabbi of Tzfat Shmuel Eliyahu) canceled plans to attend the "million-man march". Roads in the capital around the protest area were blocked in the early afternoon, and Route 1, the main highway between the capital and the coast, was closed to private vehicles from 2:00 to 7:00 p.m.

The organizers, who called for a "million-man protest" by men and boys aged nine and older, estimated attendance at 500,000; police estimated a crowd at 300,000. Some believed that 600,000 were present, which led to a public recitation of the Chacham HaRazim blessing. All three major Jewish streams (Lithuanian, Hasidic and Sephardic) were represented. The protest drew hundreds of thousands and was one of the largest in Israel's history, although it remained peaceful. There was loudspeaker noise heard across Jerusalem as a result. It was secured by about 3,500 police and other security personnel. No speeches were made at the rally, but at its end statements received by the Council of Torah Sages were read opposing the conscription of yeshiva and kolel students.

=== 2015–2019 ===
On 2 February 2015, following an incident where an ultra-Orthodox Jew was arrested for refusing to join the IDF, hundreds of ultra-Orthodox Jews blocked roads in Israel, in the cities of Ashdod, Hadera, Bnei Brak, Elad and more, About 50 were arrested, a policeman was slightly injured. On 21 August 2016, following an incident where an ultra-Orthodox Jew was arrested for refusing to join the IDF, riots broke out in Jerusalem and Beit Shemesh. stones were thrown at Israeli policemen. Three were arrested.

On 8 February 2017, ultra-Orthodox Jews from Jerusalem Faction blocked many places in Israel. Three policeman were injured and 50 protesters were arrested. On 29 March, ultra-Orthodox Jews from Edah HaChareidis and Jerusalem Faction were in a huge rally against the conscription and arrest of refusers. 30 were arrested. On 11 June, a rally was held at Barclays Center in Brooklyn. Close to 20,000 Haredim attended. The speakers included Rabbi Aaron Schechter, Yeshiva Rabbi Chaim Berlin, Rabbi Leibish Leiser of Pshevorsk, known as The Pshevorsker Rebbe, one of the most prominent leaders of the Haredi community of Antwerp, Belgium, and Rabbi Yaakov Shapiro, author of The Empty Wagon: Zionism's Journey from Identity Crisis to Identity Theft. A letter was read from Rabbi Aharon Feldma, the rosh yeshiva of Yeshivas Ner Yisroel in Baltimore, who was unable to attend in person. Rabbi Schechter lambasted the attempt to draft Orthodox Jews as an assault on the essential characteristics of religious Jews. On 26 October 2017, hundreds of ultra-Orthodox Jews held a protest at Kikar HaShabbat in Jerusalem. 5 were arrested. On 26 November, ultra-Orthodox Jews blocked Chords Bridge. 36 were arrested.

On 8 March 2018, ultra-Orthodox Jews from the Jerusalem Faction protested in different places in Jerusalem. On 22 March, ultra-Orthodox Jews from the Jerusalem Faction blocked entrance to Jerusalem. 28 were arrested. On 5 July, Edah HaChareidis held a protest at Kikar HaShabbat in Jerusalem, chanting "We'll die and not conscript". On 6 August, 500 ultra-Orthodox Jews from the Jerusalem Faction protested in Bnei Brak. 29 were arrested.

On 7 March 2019, following an incident where an ultra-Orthodox Jew was arrested for refusing to join the IDF, more than 500 from the Jerusalem Faction blocked main roads in Jerusalem. they changed "We'll die and not conscript". 30 were arrested. On 2 July, following an incident where an ultra-Orthodox Jew was arrested for refusing to join the IDF, more than 2,000 from the Jerusalem Faction blocked main roads in Jerusalem. 22 were arrested.

=== 2020s ===
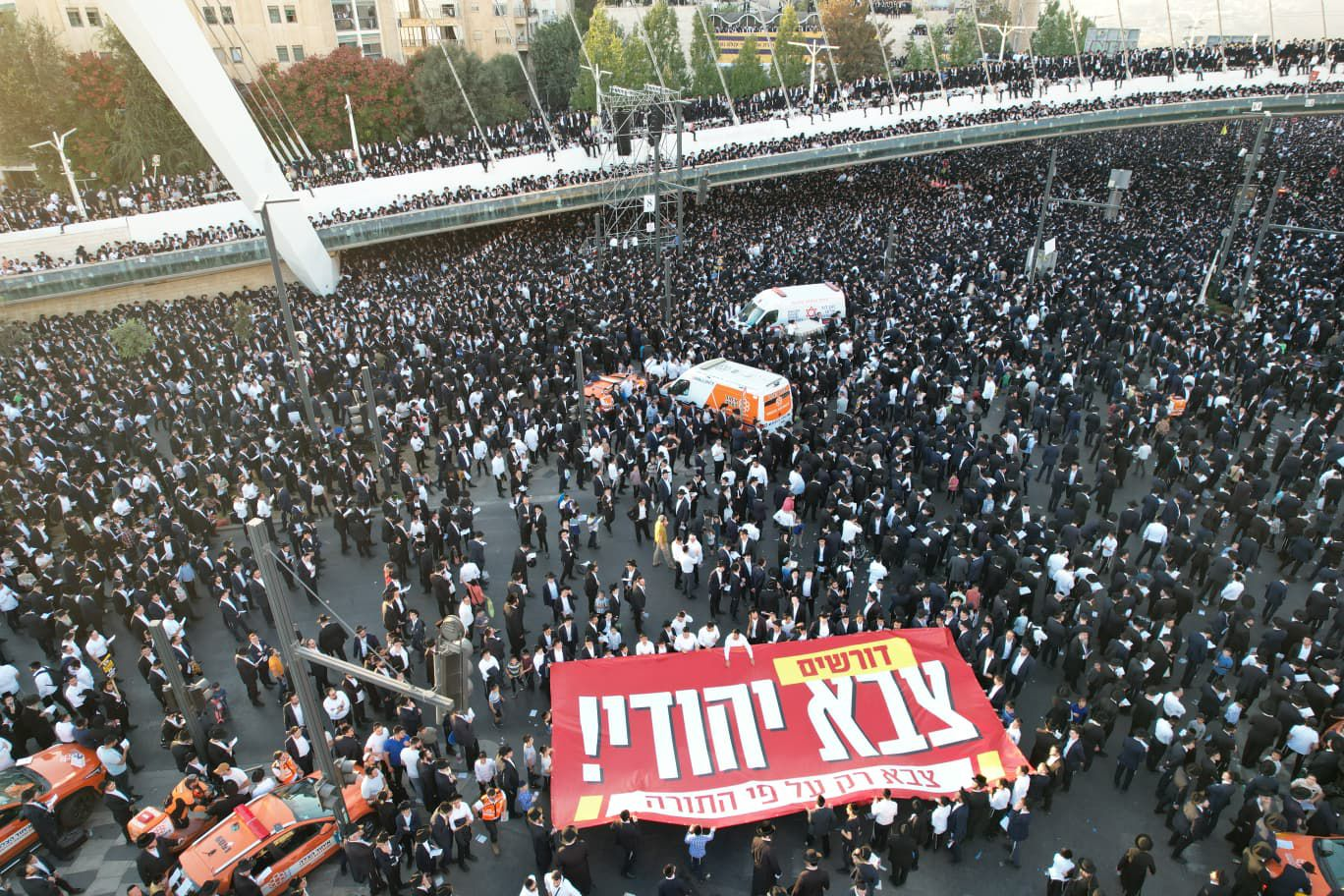
Ultra-Orthodox Jews hold a sign saying "Jewish military only by the Torah", 2025

On 3 February 2020, hundreds of ultra-Orthodox Jews from the Jerusalem Faction blocked Israeli Highway 4 in Bnei Brak in solidarity with "conscription refusers". 3 policeman were injured and 13 were arrested. On 22 December, following an incident where an ultra-Orthodox Jew (Shachna Rotenberg) was arrested for refusing to join the IDF, 2,000 from the Jerusalem Faction blocked Highway 1. one policeman and one protester got injured. 3 were arrested On 27 December, following an incident where an ultra-Orthodox Jew (Shachna Rotenberg) was arrested for refusing to join the IDF, more than 1,000 from the Jerusalem Faction blocked Highway 4. 13 protesters were arrested.

On 15 November 2021, ultra-Orthodox Jews from the Jerusalem Faction blocked Israeli Highway 4 in Bar-Ilan Interchange. 2 were arrested.

On 6 March 2022, following an incident where an ultra-Orthodox Jew was arrested for refusing to join the IDF, the Jerusalem Faction protested in Chords Bridge. Israeli politician Yoel Razvozov was stuck in his car because of protesters. 7 were arrested. On 8 March, following an incident where an ultra-Orthodox Jew was arrested for refusing to join the IDF, the Jerusalem Faction blocked Israeli Highway 4. 7 were arrested.

On 13 September 2023, following an incident where an ultra-Orthodox Jew was arrested for refusing to join the IDF, thousands from the Jerusalem Faction blocked the Tel Aviv Light Rail, the entrance to Jerusalem, and Israeli Highway 4 in protests. 3 were arrested.

==== 2024 ====
In June 2024, Supreme Court ruled to conscript thousands of ultra-Orthodox Jews.

- 3 March - ultra-Orthodox Jews from the Jerusalem Faction blocked Israeli Highway 4 in Bnei Brak with the slogan "We'll die and not conscript".
- 18 March - ultra-Orthodox Jews from the Jerusalem Faction blocked number of roads in Jerusalem. 1 was arrested.
- 1 April - ultra-Orthodox Jews from the Jerusalem Faction blocked Israeli Highway 4 in Bnei Brak. 5 were arrested.
- 11 April - ultra-Orthodox Jews from the Jerusalem Faction blocked an IDF Conscription Office in Jerusalem.
- 2 May - ultra-Orthodox Jews blocked Israeli Highway 4 in Bnei Brak. 6 were arrested.
- 20 May - ultra-Orthodox Jews from the Jerusalem Faction protested in Bnei Brak.
- 2 June - ultra-Orthodox Jews blocked cinema city junction in Jerusalem. 6 were arrested.
- 9 June - ultra-Orthodox Jews from the Jerusalem Faction blocked Israeli Highway 4 on Geha Interchange.
- 20 June - ultra-Orthodox Jews from the Jerusalem Faction blocked Israeli Highway 4 on Aluf Sade Interchange.
- 27 June - ultra-Orthodox Jews blocked Israeli Highway 4 in Bnei Brak. 32 were arrested.
- 30 June - Tens of thousands of ultra-Orthodox Jews from the Jerusalem Faction protested in Jerusalem and stoned Minister of Housing and Construction Yitzhak Goldknopf's vehicle. Others set bins on fire and the Israeli Police dispersed them with a water cannon.
- 6 August - approximately 500 Haredi protestors stormed the Tel HaShomer army base in protest of mandatory conscription. Only 8% of summoned Haredi youth appeared on the first day.

=== Solidarity protests abroad ===
On June 9, 2013, a rally was held in Foley Square in Manhattan attended by 20,000–30,000 Haredim. Among the speakers was Rabbi Elya Ber Wachtfogel, the rosh yeshiva of Yeshiva Gedolah Zichron Moshe in South Fallsburg, N.Y.

On June 27, 2013, Haredim protested in front of the EU headquarters in Brussels, Belgium against Israel attempting to draft Orthodox yeshiva students. The protest was attended by Rabbi Ephraim Padwa, head of The Union of Orthodox Hebrew Congregations in London, Rabbi Elyakim Schlesinger, a prominent English rosh yeshiva and internationally recognized halachic authority, and Rabbi Leibish Leiser of Pshevorsk from Antwerp, Belgium.

A protest in London on March 3, 2014 drew 4,000 demonstrators

On June 11, 2017, a similar rally was held at Barclays Center in Brooklyn. Close to 20,000 Haredim attended. The speakers included Rabbi Aaron Schechter, Yeshiva Rabbi Chaim Berlin, Rabbi Leibish Leiser of Pshevorsk, known as The Pshevorsker Rebbe, one of the most prominent leaders of the Haredi community of Antwerp, Belgium, and Rabbi Yaakov Shapiro, author of The Empty Wagon: Zionism's Journey from Identity Crisis to Identity Theft. A letter was read from Rabbi Aharon Feldman, the rosh yeshiva of Yeshivas Ner Yisroel in Baltimore, who wasn't able to attend in person. Rabbi Schechter lambasted the attempt to draft Orthodox Jews as an assault on the essential characteristics of religious Jews.

== See also ==
- Nahal Haredi
- David Leibel
- Shlav Bet
- Hesder
- Tal Committee
- Refusal to serve in the Israel Defense Forces
- Exemption from military service in Israel
- Religious relations in Israel
  - Status quo (Israel)
  - Haredim and Zionism
- Jewish City Guard
