= Arye Carmon =

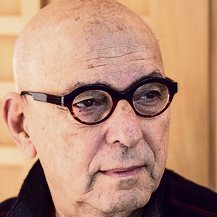
Portrait of Arye Carmon

Arye Carmon (Hebrew: אריה כרמון; born 1943) is the Founding President and Senior Fellow at the Israel Democracy Institute (IDI). He helped to found the institute in 1991 as an independent think tank dedicated to promoting and strengthening democracy and democratic values in Israel.

== Biography ==
Arye (Arik) Carmon was born in Jerusalem in 1943. He received a B.A. in History and Philosophy and an M.A. in History from the Hebrew University of Jerusalem. He went on to earn a Ph.D. from the University of Wisconsin with a major in European History and a minor in Educational Policy Studies. Since then he has taught at prestigious institutes around the world including Max Planck Institut in Germany, UCLA and Stanford University in the United States. He also taught at Hebrew University's School of Public Policy.

In the 1960s, Carmon was an Educational adviser at the Boyer School in Jerusalem, and he later served as Deputy Principal of the ORT Alliance High School. In the 1970s he was Head of the Curriculum Division of the Youth Department of the Ministry of Education, and Academic advisor and moderator of the educational series "Open Circuit" on Israeli Educational Television. In the 1980s he served as Chairman of the Israeli National Committee for Fostering Democratic Education. Carmon has been a member of the International Council of Yad Vashem since 1979, and President of the Israeli-Diaspora Institute.

Carmon has written extensively on education, Israel-Diaspora relations, and the Holocaust.

== Published works ==
- Schooling of a Society in the Making: Education in Israel
- Mamlachtiyut Yehudit
- The Holocaust (educational program for high school students)
- Reinventing Israeli Democracy
- Building Democracy on Sand

== See also ==
- Education in Israel
