= Nahum Rakover =

Israeli legal scholar (born 1932)

- נחום רקובר
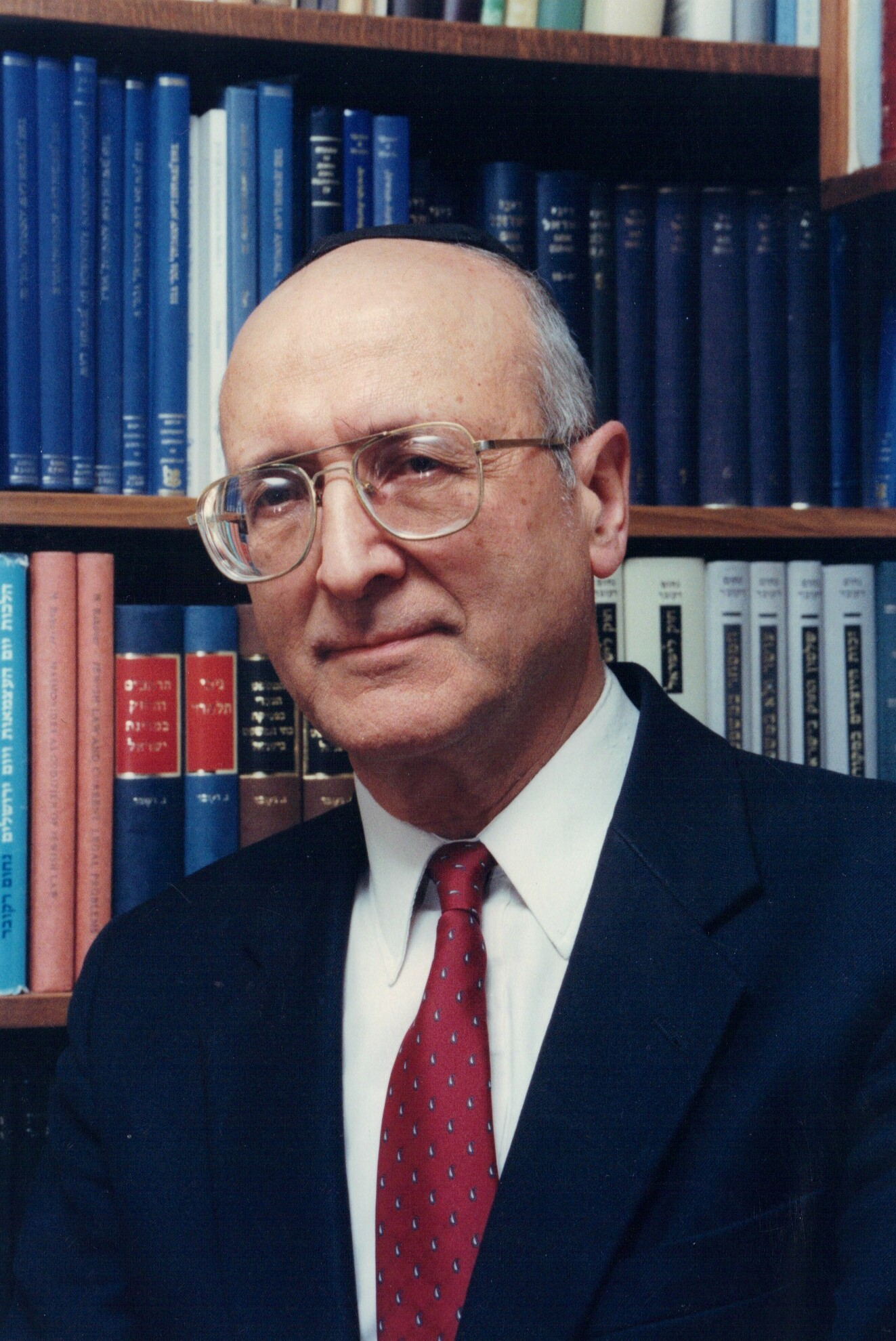
- Nahum Rakover
- Born: 13 November 1932 (age 93)
- Known for: Application of Jewish law to Israel's state legal system
- Awards: Israel Prize (2002); Yakir Yerushalayim (2010); The EMET Prize (2019)

Academic work
- Institutions: Bar-Ilan University

Nahum Rakover (Hebrew: נחום רקובר b. 13 November 1932), professor emeritus at Bar-Ilan University, is an Israeli former deputy attorney general. Rakover is a leading researcher in the application of traditional Jewish rabbinic law to Israel's state legal system.

== Legal career ==
Nahum Rakover is a prolific author on Jewish law and associated with the Mishpat Ivri movement, and is the author of over 30 books and 200 articles. In addition to important monographs, he has compiled several bibliographies on the use of Jewish law in Israeli judicial opinions, legislative deliberations, and scholarship. He is the advisor on Jewish Law to the Israeli Ministry of Justice.

Rakover's 2-volume "Jewish Law in the Debates of the Knesset" explores the applications of Jewish law to the problems of modern Israeli society from a legislative rather than a judicial perspective. Of particular interest is his discussion of the 1980 Foundations of Law Act, which looks at the extent to which Jewish law can be used as a basis or supplement to the legal system of Israel.

Rakover has been the main author and editor for The Jewish Legal Heritage Society.

== Awards and recognition ==
Rakover's work has won him numerous awards, including:

- In 2002, he was awarded the Israel Prize, for Jewish thought.
- In 2010, he received the Yakir Yerushalayim (Worthy Citizen of Jerusalem) award from the city of Jerusalem.
- In 2019, he was awarded The EMET Prize for Art, Science and Culture in the Humanities for Jewish Law.

== Selected works ==
- Law and the Noahides: law as a universal value
- Guide to the Sources of Jewish Law
- Multi-Language Bibliography of Jewish Law
- Commerce in Jewish Law (HaMischar b'Mishpat HaIvri)
- Copyright in Jewish Law (Zchut HaYotzrim baMekorot haYehudiyim)
- The Rule of Law in the Jewish Sources (Shilton haChok b'Yisrael)
- Unjust Enrichment in Jewish Law (Osher v'Lo b'Mishpat)
- Human Dignity in Jewish Law (Gadol Kvod haBriot)
- Ends that Justify the Means (Matara haMekadesheket et haEmtzaim)
- Sacrificing One to Save Many (Mesirut Nefesh – Hakravat haYahid l'Hatzalat haKlal)
- Environment and Judaism, Legal and Philosophical Perspectives (Eichut haSeviva)

Rakover also was the editor of the following works:

- Jewish Law in the Israeli Courts (HaMishpat HaIvri b'Psikat Batei HaMishpat b'Yisrael) 2 volumes. (English translation published as: Modern Applications of Jewish Law; Resolution of Contemporary Problems According to Jewish Sources in Israeli Courts)
- Jewish Law in the Debates of the Knesset (HaMishpat HaIvri b'Chakikat HaKneset) 2 volumes.
- Jewish Law and Current Legal Problems, Jerusalem: The Library of Jewish Law

== See also ==
- List of Israel Prize recipients
