= Religious relations in Israel =

Israel is the home to Haredim, non-Haredi Orthodox, Karaite, Ethiopian, Reform, Conservative, and secular Jews, as well as adherents of other religions in Israel. The religious status quo, agreed to by David Ben-Gurion with the Orthodox parties at the time of Israel's declaration of independence in 1948, is an agreement on the role that Judaism would play in Israel's government and the judicial system. Tensions exist between religious and secular groups in Israel.

== Background ==
As of 2010, 8% of Israel's Jewish population above the age of 20 defines itself as Haredi (sometimes referred to as ultra-Orthodox), 12% as religious (generally Orthodox), 13% as traditional-religious, 25% as traditional, and 42% as secular. Among the Arab population, 8% define themselves as very religious, 47% as religious, 27% as not very religious, and 18% as not religious.

For those under the age of 20, in Jewish secondary schools, 20.2% are Haredi, 17.3% are religious, and 62.5% are non-religious. In primary school, 28.9% are Haredi, 18.5% religious, and 52.6% are non-religious.

== Relations within the Jewish community ==
The State of Israel allows freedom of religion for all religious communities, both in law and in practice. Freedom House reports that in Israel: "Freedom of religion is respected. Each community has jurisdiction over its own members in matters of marriage, burial, and divorce."

One point of contention between Haredi and non-Haredi Jewish Israelis is the topic of Haredi conscription. This is because Haredi Israelis were previously exempt from military service as long as they were devoted full-time to Torah study. Many leaders of Haredi yeshivas encourage students to apply for exemptions from service, ostensibly to protect them from the secularizing environment of the IDF. Over the years, the number of exemptions has grown to about 10% of conscriptable manpower. Many secular Israelis consider the system of exemptions to be systematic shirking of duty to serve in the IDF by a large segment of society.

Haredi couples tend to marry young and often rely on government assistance sooner and to a greater extent than do secular Israelis. Haredi Israelis are also represented by Haredi political parties, which like all smaller parties in a system of proportional representation may tend to wield disproportionate political power at the point when government coalitions need to be negotiated and formed following national elections.

As of June 2008, the two main Haredi parties in the Knesset are Shas, representing Sephardi and Mizrahi interests, and United Torah Judaism, an alliance of Degel HaTorah (Lithuanian Haredi) and Agudath Yisrael. Secular Israelis often view Haredi Israelis with distrust or animosity. The Shinui party was created as a backlash to the perceived influence of the Haredi parties, and to represent the interests of secular Jews that supposedly were not seen to by the other non-religious parties.

Tension also exists between the Orthodox establishment and the Conservative and Reform movements. Only Orthodox Judaism is officially recognized in Israel (though conversions conducted by Conservative and Reform clergy outside of Israel may be accepted for the purposes of the Law of Return). As a result, Conservative and Reform synagogues receive minimal government funding and support. In the past, Conservative and Reform rabbis cannot officiate at religious ceremonies, and any marriages, divorces, and conversions they perform are not considered valid. Conservative and Reform Jews have been prohibited from holding services at the Western Wall on the grounds that they violate Orthodox norms regarding participation of women. Tensions surrounding practices at the Kotel have received international attention and have resulted in the formation of a group, Women of the Wall, dedicated to ensuring that Jewish women are allowed to pray at the Kotel in their fashion.

=== Tensions between Haredim and secular Jews ===
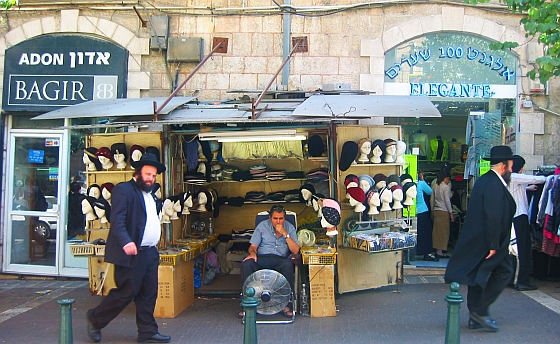
Meah Shearim neighborhood, Jerusalem

The Haredi community in Israel has adopted a policy of cultural dissociation, but at the same time, it has struggled to remain politically active, perceiving itself as the true protector of the country's Jewish nature.

The issues date to the late nineteenth-early twentieth century, with the rise of Zionism. The vast majority of Haredi Jews rejected Zionism for a number of reasons. Chief among these was the claim that Jewish political independence could only be obtained through Divine intervention, with the coming of the Jewish Messiah. Any attempt to force history was seen as an open rebellion against Judaism (for a more complete exposition of this ideology see Three Oaths; Vayoel Moshe; Neturei Karta).

More important was the dislike that the political and cultural Zionism of the time felt toward any manifestation of religion. Influenced by socialism, secular Zionists looked on religion as an outdated relic, which should disappear (or, according to some extreme views, even be eradicated) in favor of Jewish nationalism. As with the nineteenth century Reform Judaism movement in Germany, the result was mutual recriminations, rejection, and harsh verbal attacks. To Zionists, Haredi Jews were either "primitives" or "parasites"; to Haredi Jews, Zionists were tyrannizing heretics. This cultural conflict still plagues Israeli society today, where animosity between the two groups has even pervaded both their educational systems.

Despite the animosity, it was necessary for the two groups to work out some modus vivendi in the face of a more dangerous enemy, the Nazis. This was achieved by a division of powers and authority, based on the division that existed during the British Mandate in the country. Known as the "status quo", it granted political authority (such as control over public institutions, the army, etc.) to the then-secular Zionist establishment, and religious authority (such as control over marriage, divorce, conversions, etc.) to the Orthodox. A compromise worked out by Labor Zionist leader Berl Katznelson even before statehood ensured that public institutions accommodate the Orthodox by observing the Sabbath and providing kosher food.

Notwithstanding these compromises, many Haredi groups maintained their previous apolitical stance. The community had split into two parts: Agudat Israel, which cooperated with the state, and the Edah HaChareidis, which fiercely opposed it. Both groups still exist today, with the same attitudes. The Edah HaChareidis includes a number of Hasidic groups, such as Satmar, Dushinsky, and Toldos Aharon, as well as several non-Hasidic groups of Lithuanian and Hungarian background.

A small minority of Jews, who claim to have been descended from communities who had lived peacefully with their Arab neighbors during the 18th and early 19th centuries, took a different stance. In 1935, they formed a new grouping called the Neturei Karta out of a coalition of several previous anti-Zionist Jewish groups in the Holy Land, and aligned themselves politically with the Arabs out of a dislike for Zionist policies.

In 2010, the Sephardic Haredi political party Shas broke ranks with the aforementioned Ashkenazi Haredi organizations and joined the World Zionist Organization, becoming the first officially Zionist Haredi political party.

As part of the Status Quo Agreement worked out between prime minister David Ben-Gurion and the religious parties, Haredi leader Rabbi Avraham Yeshayah Karelitz (known as the Chazon Ish) was promised that the government would exempt a group of religious scholars (at that time, 400) from compulsory military service so that they could pursue their studies.

Finally, the Agudat Israel party, supported by much of the Haredi population, was invited to participate in the governing coalition. It agreed, but did not appoint any ministers, since that would have implied participation in non-religious actions taken by the government.

Haredim proved to be able politicians, gradually increasing their leverage and influence. In addition, the Haredi population grew substantially, giving them a larger power base. From a small group of just four members in the 1977 Knesset, they gradually increased the number of seats they hold to 22 (out of 120) in 1999. In effect, they controlled the balance of power between the country's two major parties.

In the early 1980s, the Shas party of Sephardic Haredim was set up. Shas appealed to Sephardim who felt marginalized by the dominant Ashkenazi Zionist establishment. In 1999, Shas gained 17 Knesset seats (other Haredim won 5 seats). Taking the attitude that restoring Sephardic pride and restoring Sephardic religious observance are one and the same, Shas has created devoted cadres of newly religious and semi-religious men and women with the zeal of neophytes and an animosity toward the country's secular European political establishment. Furthermore, the movement has shown unwavering and determined obedience in its supporters to the teachings of it spiritual leader, Rabbi Ovadiah Yosef.

The Haredim are often at odds with the Supreme Court of Israel, which does not base its rulings on halachic beliefs or policy. A notable case of this trend is the "Who Is a Jew?" case, in which the Supreme Court ruled that the Ministry of the Interior (then controlled by Shas) must recognize Reform and Conservative converts to Judaism. In many instances, the Haredim have responded to these perceived threats angrily, verbally defending against their opponents. At the same time, they recognize the animosity many secular Israelis feel toward them, and have embarked on various public relations campaigns and other media projects to improve their image among the general public. In practice, the Israeli Haredim remain firmly entrenched in seats of political power befitting their voting strength, with both blocs doing everything they can to gain their support.

The Haredim are relatively poor, compared to other Israelis, but represent an important market sector. Consequently, the Israeli Haredim "probably spend more time in formal study than any other class of humans ever has in the history of the planet". "More than 50 percent live below the poverty line and get state allowances, compared with 15 percent of the rest of the population..." Their families are also larger, usually having six or seven children.

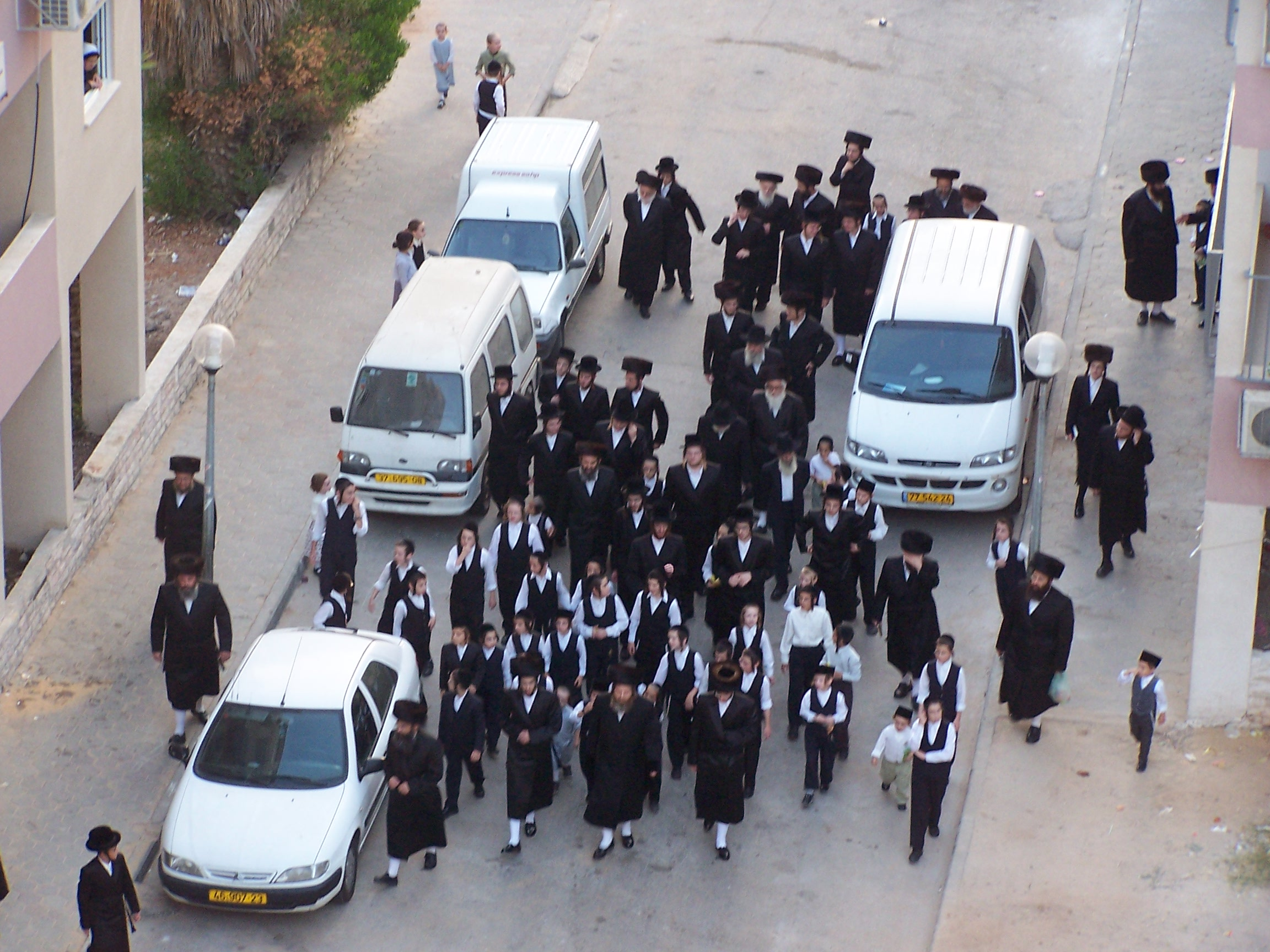
Haredim going to the synagogue in Rehovot, Israel

In recent years, there has been a process of reconciliation and a merging of Haredi Jews with Israeli society, for example in relation to employment. While not compromising on religious issues and their strict code of life, Haredi Jews have become more open to the secular Israeli culture. Haredi Jews, such as satirist Kobi Arieli, publicist Sehara Blau and politician Israel Eichler write regularly to leading Israeli newspapers. Another important factor in the reconciliation process has been the activity of ZAKA – a voluntary rescue organization run by Haredim, which provides emergency first response medical attention at suicide bombing scenes and retrieves human remains found there to provide proper burial. Another important unifying organization is Yad Sarah, established by Uri Lupolianski (mayor of Jerusalem 2003–2009) in 1977. Yad Sarah is the largest national volunteer organization in Israel, with over 6,000 volunteers representing all ages and backgrounds, including different socioeconomic sectors and cultural and religious backgrounds. Yad Sarah provides free loans of medical and rehabilitative home-care equipment to Jews, Christians, Muslims and Druze, enabling hundreds of thousands of sick, disabled, elderly and recuperating patients to live at home. Its menu of free or nominal-fee services also includes oxygen service, wheelchair transportation, national emergency alarm system, services for the homebound, legal aid for the elderly, geriatric dentistry, day rehabilitation centers, a play center for special needs children, and an education and recreation club for retirees. Yad Sarah receives no government funding, yet saves the country's economy an estimated $320 million in hospital fees and long-term care costs each year.

Between Haredi Judaism and National Religious or Religious Zionist Judaism, there is also a category of Orthodox Jews known as 'Hardalim', who combine Religious Zionism with a stricter adherence to Halacha.

=== Secular–religious status quo ===
The religious status quo, agreed to by David Ben-Gurion with the Orthodox parties at the time of Israel's declaration of independence in 1948, is an agreement on the role that Judaism would play in Israel's government and the judicial system. The agreement was based upon a letter sent by Ben-Gurion to Agudat Israel dated June 19, 1947. Under this agreement, which still operates in most respects today:

- The Chief Rabbinate has authority over kashrut, shabbat, Jewish burial and personal status issues, such as marriage, divorce, and conversions.
- Streets in Haredi neighborhoods are closed to traffic on the Jewish Sabbath.
- There is no public transport on the Jewish Sabbath, and most businesses are closed. However, there is public transport in Haifa, since Haifa had a large Arab population at the time of the British Mandate.
- Restaurants who wish to advertise themselves as kosher must be certified by the Chief Rabbinate.
- Importation of non-kosher foods is prohibited. Despite this prohibition, a few pork farms supply establishments selling white meat, due to demand therefore among specific population sectors, particularly the Russian immigrants of the 1990s. Despite the status quo, the Supreme Court ruled in 2004 that local governments are not allowed to ban the sale of pork, although this had previously been a common by-law.

Nevertheless, some breaches of the status quo have become prevalent, such as several suburban malls remaining open during the Sabbath. Though this is contrary to the law, the government largely turns a blind eye.

Many parts of the "status quo" have been challenged by secular Israelis regarding the Chief Rabbinate's strict control over Jewish weddings, Jewish divorce proceedings, conversions, and the question of who is a Jew for the purposes of immigration.

While the state of Israel enables freedom of religion for all of its citizens, it does not enable civil marriage. The state forbids and disapproves of any civil marriages or non-religious divorces performed amongst within the country. Because of this, some Israelis choose to marry outside of Israel.

The Ministry of Education manages the secular and Orthodox school networks of various faiths in parallel, with a limited degree of independence and a common core curriculum.

In recent years, perceived frustration with the status quo among the secular population has strengthened parties such as Shinui, which advocate separation of religion and state, without much success so far.

Today the secular Israeli-Jews claim that they aren't religious and don't observe Jewish law, and that Israel as a democratic modern country should not force the observance thereof upon its citizens against their will. The Orthodox Israeli-Jews claim that the separation between state and religion will contribute to the end of Israel's Jewish identity.

Signs of the first challenge to the status quo came in 1977, with the fall of the Labor government that had been in power since independence, and the formation of a right-wing coalition under Menachem Begin. Right-wing Revisionist Zionism had always been more acceptable to the Orthodox parties, since it did not share the same history of anti-religious rhetoric that marked socialist Zionism. Furthermore, Begin needed the Haredi members of the Knesset (Israel's unicameral parliament) to form his coalition, and offered more power and benefits to their community than what they had been accustomed to receiving, including a lifting of the numerical limit on military exemptions for those engaged in full-time Torah study.

On the other hand, secular Israelis began questioning whether a "status quo" based on the conditions of the 1940s and 1950s was still relevant in the 1980s and 1990s, and reckoned that they had cultural and institutional support to enable them to change it regardless of its relevance. They challenged Orthodox control of personal affairs such as marriage and divorce, resented the lack of entertainment and transportation options on the Jewish Sabbath (then the country's only day of rest), and questioned whether the burden of military service was being shared equitably, since the 400 scholars who originally benefited from the exemption, had grown to 50,000. Finally, the Progressive and Masorti communities, though still small, began to exert themselves as an alternative to the Haredi control of religious issues. No one was happy with the "status quo"; the Orthodox used their newfound political force to attempt to extend religious control, and the non-Orthodox sought to reduce or even eliminate it.

=== Mehadrin bus lines ===
Religious tensions exist surrounding Mehadrin bus lines, a type of bus line in Israel that mostly runs in and/or between major Haredi population centers, in which gender segregation and other rigid religious rules observed by some ultra-Orthodox Jews are applied. Non-Haredi female passengers have complained of being harassed and forced to sit at the back of the bus.

The so-called "mehadrin" bus lines were created in the late 1990s for the Haredi public. It began with two lines in Jerusalem and Bnei Brak in 1997. In fall 2001, Dan and Egged bus companies, in order to compete with private buses run by Haredim, had come to an agreement with the ultra-Orthodox Mehadrin Council. In 2007 there were an estimated thirty "mehadrin" buses operated by public transportation companies, in early 2010 the number had risen to more than fifty.

In a ruling of January 2011, the Israeli High Court of Justice stated the unlawfulness of gender segregation and abolished the "mehadrin" public buses. However, the court rule allows the continuation of the gender segregation in public buses on a strictly voluntary basis for a one-year experimental period.

==== Bus incidents ====
- A secular woman, hailed as "Israeli Rosa Parks", who refused to move to the back of the bus when told to by a Haredi man on Egged bus line 451 from Ashdod to Jerusalem, where women commonly sit in the back, made headlines both in Israeli and international media. A Haredi woman's taking a seat in a front row on the same Egged bus a few days later remained mostly unnoticed by the media.
- On December 28, 2011, a Haredi man allegedly asked a female IDF soldier on city bus line 49A in Jerusalem's Ramat Eshkol neighborhood to move to the back of the bus. When she refused, he allegedly called her a "slut" and continued to harass her until the driver called the police. The man was arrested and charged with sexual harassment and unruly misconduct in a public place before being released on bail.

==== Beit Shemesh incidents ====
Conflicts between Haredim on one side and Religious Zionists and secular Jews on the other side had been ongoing for several years in Beit Shemesh, occasionally leading to isolated incidents of violence and demonstrations from both sides, without being noticed by the wider Israeli public. However, in December 2011, the following incidents captured the attention of the national and international media.

- Protests by extremist Haredim thought to be affiliated with the Sikrikim group and Neturei Karta against the Orthodox 'Orot Banot' girls elementary school in Beit Shemesh, located on the border of a Haredi neighborhood, escalated; at one point, one of the extremists allegedly spat on a 7-year-old girl, Na'ama Margolis. This incident was reported by Channel 2 television news, and quickly became an international news topic, attracting the attention of the entire Israeli political spectrum and leading to widespread condemnation.
- Shortly afterwards, a journalist in Beit Shemesh photographed a sign attached to a lamppost on the sidewalk in front of a synagogue nearby, requesting women to walk by without stopping or cross the street. A major public outcry from the secular public led to the Beit Shemesh mayor and police deciding to immediately remove the sign, the removal of which led to clashes with local residents opposing the removal of the sign. The sign had been up for nearly 8 years without incident. It hung in a small alley between several major Haredi institutions.
- A Haredi man allegedly attacked a woman who was, in his opinion, not dressed modestly enough. This led to arrests, followed by a riot a couple of days later.

=== Other cases of friction ===
Some passengers flying on the El Al airline complained that they were asked by Haredi men to switch seats so they would not need to sit near women. Groups of Haredim would secure blocks of up to 20 seats for themselves. The airline was accused of facilitating such requests of seat-switching, which were mostly targeted at women.

=== Alleged demonization of Haredim ===
In November 2011, Knesset speaker Reuven Rivlin suggested that, "Haredim face the same demonization, in which 'harmful marginal groups' are portrayed as the norm."

Israel Harel of Haaretz wrote that "one can safely assume that the goal of most of the critics, including the religious ones, is Haredi-bashing, pure and simple," concluding: "the main problem for which the ultra-Orthodox can be collectively blamed, and their rabbis held responsible, is the degeneration to which they have sentenced themselves, of which segregation is only one symptom." Gideon Levy wrote in Haaretz that "the campaign against the ultra-Orthodox, all of them, went beyond all proportion", adding "unfortunately, the ultra-Orthodox are not the only enemies of enlightenment and freedom around, and it's doubtful they're the most dangerous. But they're a convenient and easy punching bag".

Member of Knesset Yisrael Eichler of United Torah Judaism criticized what he called the "coordinated campaign of the media and secular lobbying groups" designed "to portray the entire Haredi community as intemperate extremists". In his opinion, "The campaign is political and focused on trying to bring down the current government by delegitimizing coalition parties."

During the weeks following the initial incidents, Haredi news website Kikar HaShabbat called the uproar against ultra-Orthodox extremism a "secular intifada", and wrote of "a long list of verbal and physical assaults against Haredim in recent days". It opened a special email 'hotline' gathering a list of complaints, claiming incidents ranging from a secular woman grabbing a 61-year-old Haredi women by the throat in Rehovot to death threats, a secular Israeli loudly calling for the murder of all Haredi Jews on a city bus in Jerusalem, and a Haredi girl being spat on by a secular man in Jerusalem's Clal Building. Two incidents of violence allegedly by secular citizens against Haredi children in early January 2012 were also reported by other Israeli media:

- On January 2, an 11-year-old girl from the Erlau Hasidic movement was allegedly verbally assaulted, threatened and spat at by a young non-religious man while traveling on a Jerusalem bus. According to the report, the man also threatened to kill Haredim.
- On January 3, an 11-year old Haredi boy told the police that he was allegedly verbally and physically assaulted by two secular teens at a bus stop in Jerusalem.

A spokesperson for the Jerusalem police said the police were investigating, adding that "he did not believe that the two similar incidents were the beginning of a strong backlash against the ultra-Orthodox". According to media reports, the police say they know the perpetrator or perpetrators and are planning to make an arrest soon.

=== Reactions ===
On December 27, 2011, a rally with thousands of participants was held in Beit Shemesh to protest against religious extremism and the "exclusion of women".

On January 3, 2012, one of the main organizers of the rally, the Yisrael Hofshit religious freedom activist group, issued a statement condemning "all forms of violence and verbal abuse against the ultra-Orthodox public".

=== Use of Holocaust symbolism by Haredim ===
On December 31, 2011, hundreds of Haredi men assembled in Jerusalem's Kikar HaShabbat (Sabbath Square) in a demonstration organized by the Edah HaChareidis, protesting what they call "the exclusion of Haredim" – using the same word the secular media used for the "exclusion of women" by some Haredim. Some protesters wore Holocaust-style yellow badges, claiming they are persecuted as Jews by the Israeli state. Politicians of various parties expressed outrage over the use of Holocaust symbolism during the protest, and the incident was widely reported in the international media. Following widespread criticism, an official of the Edah HaChareidis defended the usage of Holocaust symbols, telling Haredi news website Kikar HaShabbat they had "no regret at all" adding that "during the Shoah they tried to eliminate us physically and now the Zionists and the media are trying to eliminate us spiritually", and "This is why we wanted to express the real pain that we are experiencing."

A draft legislation has been put forward to make it a crime in Israel to use the word "Nazi" or symbols of the Holocaust for purposes other than teaching.

== Relations between Jews and Christians ==
Messianic Jews who are members of Messianic congregations, and separately evangelical Christians, are among the most active missionary movements in Israel. Their proselytizing has faced demonstrations and intermittent protests by the Haredi anti-missionary group Yad L'Achim, which infiltrates those movements, as well as other proselytizing groups, including Hare Krishna and Scientology, and maintains extensive records on their activities. Attempts by Messianic Jews to evangelize Jews are seen by religious Jews as incitement to "avodah zarah" (foreign worship or idolatry). Over the years, there have been several arson attempts of messianic congregations. There have also been attacks on Messianic Jews and hundreds of New Testaments distributed in Or Yehuda were burned. While missionary activity is legal, it is illegal to offer money or other material inducements, and legislation banning missionary work outright has been attempted in the past.

Orthodox Jewish communities in Israel have come under scrutiny for the negative stereotyping and scapegoating of Christian minorities in the region, including violent acts against Christian missionaries and communities. A frequent complaint of Christian clergy in Israel is being spat at by Jews, often Haredi yeshiva students. The Anti-Defamation League has called on the chief Rabbis to speak out against the interfaith assaults. In January 2010, Christian leaders, Israeli Foreign ministry staff, representatives of the Jerusalem municipality and the Haredi community met to discuss the problem. The Haredi Community Tribunal of Justice published a statement condemning the practice, stating that it was a "desecration of God's name". Several events were planned in 2010 by the liberal Orthodox Yedidya congregation to show solidarity with Christians and improve relations between the Haredi and Christian communities of Jerusalem.

== See also ==
- Edah HaChareidis
- Haredim and Zionism
- Neturei Karta
- Sikrikim
- Haredi conscription in Israel
- Women in Israel

== Related reading ==
- Sobel, Zvi (1993). A Small Place in Galilee: Religion and Social Conflict in an Israeli Village. New York: Holmes & Meier. p. 253. ISBN 978-0-8419-1342-4. OCLC 28066333.

- (Book review): Review of A Small Place in Galilee: Religion and Social Conflict in an Israeli Village. From Middle East Forum, a think tank based in Philadelphia

- Wald, Kenneth D.; Shye, Samuel (1994). "Interreligious Conflict in Israel: The Group Basis of Conflicting Visions". Political Behavior. 16 (1): 157–178. doi:10.1007/BF01541646. JSTOR 586486. S2CID 143321833.
