= Status quo (Israel) =

Secular–religious political understanding

In Israel, the term status quo (or the secular–religious status quo) refers to a political understanding between secular and religious political parties not to alter the communal arrangement in relation to religious matters. The established Jewish religious communities in Israel desire to maintain and promote the religious character of the state, while the secular community sometimes wishes to reduce the impact of religious regulations in their everyday lives. Occasionally, one political side seeks to make changes to inter-communal arrangements, but these are often met by political opposition from the other side. The status quo preserves the established religious relations in Israel, and only small changes are usually made.

== Origins ==
The prevailing view attributes the origins of the status quo to a letter sent by David Ben-Gurion, as chairman of the Jewish Agency Executive, on 19 June 1947, to the ultra-Orthodox Agudat Israel, in order to form a united policy to present to the United Nations Special Committee on Palestine (UNSCOP), which had commenced its fact-finding tour four days earlier. The letter was meant to address their concerns that the emerging State of Israel will be a secular one, which might hurt the status of religion and religious institutions, as well as the values of their followers.

In the letter, Ben-Gurion stated that neither the Jewish Agency Executive nor any other body in the country is authorized to determine in advance the constitution of the emerging Jewish state, and its secular character. One precondition from the U.N. for the establishment of the Jewish state was freedom of thought and freedom of speech to all its citizens. It was considered that the letter would satisfy the concerns of religious parties. The letter stipulated policy principles in four main areas that are considered fundamental to Orthodox Judaism:

- Shabbat (the Sabbath of Judaism) — the Jewish state's day of rest would be that of Judaism, between sunset on Friday and sunset on Saturday.
- Kashrut (religious Jewish kosher laws regarding food) — kitchens in the Jewish state's official institutions would keep kosher, as defined by the authorities of Orthodox Judaism, but privately, each individual would be free to choose whether to observe these rules.
- Family laws (marriage, etc.) — a single judicial system would be preserved for the purpose of marriage and divorce, with these being conducted in rabbinical courts for Jews and by the relevant religious authorities for people of other faiths, as was the case before; there would be no civil marriage.
- Education — full autonomy to the different Jewish denominations, while stipulating the minimum standards in fields such as the Hebrew language, Jewish history, science, etc.

== Personal status issues ==
The status quo arrangement in Israel officially recognised the authority of only the Orthodox rabbinate on all personal status issues. However, each of the main Jewish denominations has a different view of "Who is a Jew?". The definition has potential implications in a range of areas, including the Law of Return, on nationality, and other purposes. The Orthodox rabbinate has a very strict interpretation of Jewish status and conversion standards, and has demanded recognition only of Orthodox conversion to Judaism. The Orthodox monopoly in Israel has for many years been attacked as a "political stumbling block" in the relations between the more conservative religious community and the state and secular Jews in Israel.

On 1 March 2021, Israel’s High Court of Justice ruled that the government must recognize conversions by the Reform and Masorti (Conservative) movements in Israel for the purposes of citizenship, ending a 15-year legal saga. In 1988, the High Court had ruled that non-Orthodox conversions performed outside of Israel must be recognized for the purposes of aliyah and citizenship under the Law of Return, but did not extend that recognition to non-Orthodox conversions performed in Israel itself.

== The Law of Return ==
The political debate over "Who is a Jew?" has symbolized the secular–religious divide in Israel, and the way it has been handled. It was the principal objective of Zionism that Palestine should be the homeland for the Jewish People. When Israel was formed in 1948, that objective was taken over by the new State. The Law of Return, enacted in 1950, stipulates that every Jew has a right to make aliyah (immigrate to Israel), hence the importance of a clear definition of who is a Jew.

According to the halakha (Jewish law), a Jew is an individual who was born to a Jewish mother or one who converted to Judaism. Therefore, in those early days of the Jewish state, a temporary vagueness on the issue of "Who is a Jew?" suited the Consociationalist form of democracy that exists in Israel, since every ruling provoked a political storm. Along with the recognition of the Status quo as the regulating arrangement, a political custom has evolved, in which the Ministry of Interior would be held by one of the religious parties represented in the Knesset (the Israeli parliament); the Minister of Interior is principally responsible for citizenship, residency, and identity cards (Teudat Zehut). This custom is part of the principle of consociationalist democracy that requires governmental rewards to be granted on the basis of each party's relative importance in the eyes of the political players.

Twenty years after the Law of Return was enacted, the definition of "Who is a Jew?" was ruled to be an individual who was born to a Jewish mother, or one who has converted and is not also practicing another religion at the same time. At the same time, however, the right of entry and settlement was extended to people with one Jewish grandparent and a person who is married to a Jew, whether or not he or she is considered Jewish under Orthodox interpretations of Halakha. The political reality of the founding fathers of the state of Israel was one that emphasized the form of consociational democracy. The pattern of this model could be seen in the secular–religious fracture, and especially against the background of not having been implemented in other areas of divisions in the Israeli society.

== See also ==
- Conscription in Israel
- Religion in Israel
- Status Quo (Jerusalem and Bethlehem) - Status quo for nine shared religious sites in Holy Land
- Hashemite custodianship of Jerusalem holy sites
- Haredi conscription in Israel
- Torah study commandment
- Hesder - a system combining Torah study with military service, used mostly by the "National Religious" sector (Religious Zionism).
- Sherut Leumi
- Tal committee (the "Tal law")
- Atchalta De'Geulah
- Orthodox Judaism
- Haredi Judaism
- Religious Zionism
- Hardal
- Nahal Haredi
