= Jacob Weinroth =

Israeli attorney (1947–2018)

- יעקב וינרוט
- Born: August 2, 1947; Ansbach, Germany
- Died: October 16, 2018 (aged 71)
- Education: Ponevezh Yeshiva, Mir Yeshiva; Tel Aviv University
- Occupations: Partner at Dr. J. Weinroth & Co. Law Office
- Relatives: Dr. Avraham Weinroth
- Website: weinrothlaw.com

Jacob Weinroth (Hebrew: יעקב וינרוט; August 2, 1947 – October 16, 2018) was an Israeli attorney who specialized in litigation and was the founding partner of Dr. J. Weinroth & Co. Law Office.

== Biography ==
Jacob Weinroth was born in a displaced persons camp in Ansbach, Germany. His parents were Polish Jews who had escaped to the Soviet Union during World War II. His family moved to Israel in 1949 and settled in Netanya. He studied at Rav Amiel Yeshiva "New Yishuv" in Tel Aviv and later at the Ponevezh Yeshiva in Bnei Brak followed by the Mir Yeshiva in Jerusalem. He was ordained as a Rabbi by Rabbi Shmuel Rozovski, Rabbi Dovid Povarsky and the Head Rabbi of Jerusalem Rabbi Bezalel Zolty. He did his regular service in the Israel Defense Forces in the infantry, and later did reserve duty in the Military Advocate General's Corps.

Weinroth studied law at Tel Aviv University. He received a BA with honors in 1972, an MA with honors in 1974, and a PhD in 1981. His doctoral thesis, titled "The Law of the Rebellious Wife", dealt with ways to force husbands to divorce their wives that will be valid according to Jewish Halakha, which is the state law in Israel on matrimonial matters. His thesis included a bill proposal later passed as a law in the Knesset: Rabbinical courts law (enforcing court orders for divorce) 1995. The law, which was approved by leading Rabbis, improved the situations of women in divorce processes and is still called the "Weinroth law". The doctoral thesis is based on an argument presented by Weinroth in the upper Rabbinical court of appeals.

Weinroth lived in Ramat Gan and was married to Belgium-born Giselle. He was the father of six children. His brother, Dr. Avraham Weinroth, is a senior partner in the firm. Two of his sons also work in the firm.

Weinroth died of cancer on October 16, 2018, at age 71. He had developed cancer the previous year but continued working almost to his last day.

== Legal career ==
In 1972, Weinroth established the firm Dr. J. Weinroth & Co. Law Office and remained an active partner until his death. He served as a lecturer in the Tel Aviv University Faculty of Law from 1974 to his death in 2018. Also served as a lecturer at the Tel Aviv University Philosophy School. Weinroth specializes in white collar and civil litigation and was considered as one of Israel's leading litigators. He represented many high-profile personalities in the political arena, including Prime Minister Benjamin Netanyahu in the "Bar-On Hebron" and the "Amedi" cases and former Israeli Chief of Staff Major General. Rafael Eitan, former Minister of Finance Meir Sheetrit, former President Ezer Weizman, and others. He is famous for taking on cases without political prejudice. He represented Margalit Har Shefi (an acquaintance of Yizhak Rabin's killer Yigal Amir) in the Supreme Court and was one of the lawyers that represented the Jewish Underground in 1984–1985. On the other side of the political spectrum, he represented former Minister Salah Tarif, and Knesset member Ahmad Tibi.

In 1991, Weinroth was approached about possibly serving as a judge on the Supreme Court but turned down the offer. He was a member of the Tal Committee, which dealt with Haredi conscription, and the Ivry Commission on the civil service.

On 31 December 2009, he was indicted for bribery and money laundering. He was tried in the Tel Aviv District Court. On 31 October 2011, the court cleared him of all charges.

Weinroth was a member of the defense team of Israeli Foreign Minister Avigdor Lieberman, who was tried for corruption and acquitted in November 2013.

In 2025, an arbitrator ruled in favor of Moises and Mendi Gertner, concluding that they had entrusted Weinroth with tens of millions of dollars in 2005 to transfer to another of his clients, Dan Gertler, but that he had failed to do so. As a result, Weinroth’s heirs were ordered to pay 37.7 million dollars plus interest, bringing the total to approximately 120 million dollars.

== Published works ==
- Company Liquidation in Israel with Judge S. Luvenberg o.b.m., 1978.

== See also ==
- Israeli judicial system
- Israeli law
