= Yohanan Plesner =

Israeli politician

- יוחנן פלסנר
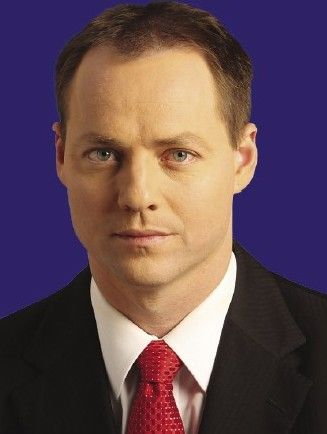

Faction represented in the Knesset
- 2007–2013: Kadima

Personal details
- Born: 17 January 1972 (age 54) London, England

Yohanan Plesner (Hebrew: יוחנן פלסנר; born January 17, 1972) is an Israeli politician who served as a member of the Knesset for Kadima between 2007 and 2013.

== Life and career ==
Plesner was born in London, the son of Danish architect Ulrik Plesner and Israeli journalist and lecturer Tamar Liebes. The couple had married in Colombo, Sri Lanka, and had moved to London, where Ulrik was working as an architect. Yohanan inherited both Israeli and Danish citizenship through his parents (he renounced his Danish citizenship in 2009 as a condition for being allowed to remain a Knesset member). He has two sisters, Daniela and Maya. In 1972, when Yohanan was two months old, the family moved to Israel and settled in Jerusalem, where his father opened an office and became a city architect.

Plesner grew up in Jerusalem, and during his national service in the Israel Defense Forces from 1989 to 1994, he served as an officer with the Sayeret Matkal commando unit. He went on to study at the prestigious Amirim Program of Excellence at the Hebrew University of Jerusalem, where he gained a BA with distinction in economics. Plesner then spent several years in the business world, first as a consultant to major financial corporations in Britain, and then as co-founder and manager of an international software company. He studied at the John F. Kennedy School of Government at Harvard University, where he earned an MPA in political economics and security studies, and spoke regularly on behalf of Israel. Upon his return to Israel, Plesner assumed the position of Head of Special Projects in the Prime Minister's Office under then Prime Minister Ariel Sharon. When the Kadima Party was founded in early 2006, Plesner was appointed the first Secretary-General of the nascent party, and led the formation of its organizational infrastructure.

Plesner lives in Hod HaSharon with his wife Shimrit and their three children Talia, Abigail and Dan. He also has two daughters, Michaela and Ayala, from a previous marriage to Matat, a lawyer.

== Member of the Knesset from 2007 to 2013 ==
Plesner became a member of Knesset in 2007. During his time in the legislature, Plesner spoke out on issues ranging from national security and electoral reform to preservation of the environment and excellence in education.

The Knesset Ethics Committee censured Plesner in 2011 for making "insulting and harmful comments that are not connected to political stances and public life, but rather an MK's personal life." Plesner, during a Haneen Zoabi speech on the Gaza Flotilla, said of Zoabi, "Go to Gaza for a week and see what happens to you, a single 38-year-old woman."

Plesner was, in 2012, Deputy Chairman of the Kadima Faction and a member of both the Constitution, Law and Justice Committee and of the Defense and Foreign Relations Committee. He was also founder of the European Forum of the Knesset, a parliamentary group dedicated to improving relations between the Knesset and European legislators, and chaired the Knesset's permanent delegation to the Council of Europe.

Placed third on the Kadima list for the 2013 elections, he lost his seat when the party was reduced to two MKs.

== Post-Knesset career ==
In 2014, Plesner was appointed President of the Israel Democracy Institute, replacing Dr. Arye Carmon upon his retirement.

== Plesner Committee ==
In 2012, Plesner chaired the Keshev committee, though widely known as the Plesner Committee, for revision in Haredi conscripting policy for the replacement of the Tal Law which was set to lapse on 1 August 2012. The committee was dissolved by Prime Minister Benjamin Netanyahu due to disagreements between coalition parties, yet Plesner publicized the recommendations which included aggressive draft goals, as well as criminal charges, fines, or loss of benefits for draft dodgers under the plan.
