= Tsevi E. Tal =

Israeli judge (1927–2021)

- צבי א. טל
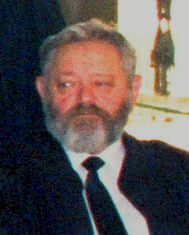
- Born: 16 January 1927; Rzeszów, Poland
- Died: 22 June 2021 (aged 94); Israel
- Occupation: Judge

Tsevi E. Tal (Hebrew: צבי א. טל; 16 January 1927 – 22 June 2021) was a Polish-born Israeli judge. After being Israeli district court judge (1978–1994) he became Justice of the Supreme Court of Israel (1994–1997).

He was the head of the Tal Committee on exemptions from military service for ultra-Orthodox Jews (1999-2000).

Tal died on 22 June 2021, aged 94.
