= Military service and conscription for autistic people =

Military authorities generally oppose military service and conscription for autistic people. Military commanders generally consider individuals with autism to be unfit for military service, and therefore often exclude them. However, it has been argued, including by neurodiversity advocates, that this exclusion constitutes discrimination against autistic people.

Neurodiversity advocates make the same argument regarding the militaries of countries that use conscription. Neurodiversity advocates argue that autistic people should not be excluded from military conscription. Neurodiversity advocates argue that completely excluding autistic people from military conscription and exempting them from service is a form of discrimination. Neurodiversity advocates argue that excluding individuals from conscription based solely on a diagnosis of autism is a violation of anti-discrimination laws.

== By country ==
=== Countries with conscription for both men and women ===
==== Sweden ====
Sweden excludes people with autism and ADHD from conscription and military service. Through the Swedish government agency Equality Ombudsman (Diskrimineringsombudsmannen), neurodiversity advocates argued that the Swedish military's policy of not conscripting autistic individuals was a form of discrimination.

Until 2021, Swedish military authorities excluded individuals with ADHD from conscription and denied their enlistment applications. In 2022, they implemented a change for ADHD: military enlistment became possible for those with mild ADHD who could "clearly prove that they had not required medication, contact with the medical system for treatment, or other support measures for more than three years." Individuals who could not meet this standard, or other people with ADHD, remained excluded. However, at that time, the Swedish military authorities did not change the rules for autistic individuals and firmly denied military service to those with autism.

In 2023, the Swedish military authorities firmly excluded autistic individuals from conscription. In response, Swedish neurodiversity advocates, through the Equality Ombudsman, filed a lawsuit arguing that the military's policy constituted discrimination against people with autism.

In 2024, Sweden continued to exclude autistic people from conscription, and it firmly rejected military enlistment applications from men with autism. Working through the Diskrimineringsombudsmannen, neurodiversity advocates argued that the administrative decision to deny military enlistment to an autistic person violated anti-discrimination laws. The Diskrimineringsombudsmannen subsequently filed a lawsuit against the military authorities on April 25, 2024. The district court then stayed the case on December 19, 2024.

In 2020, Erik Fenn was denied military enlistment by Swedish authorities and disqualified from the conscription assessment based solely on his autism diagnosis. Using the government agency Diskrimineringsombudsmannen, neurodiversity advocates argued that the Swedish military authorities had violated anti-discrimination laws. The Diskrimineringsombudsmannen then filed a lawsuit against the Swedish military on November 21, 2022, asserting this violation. They won the case at the Stockholm District Court on November 19, 2024. Following the victory, Fenn was recognized as eligible for conscription, overturning his previous exclusion. The Swedish Armed Forces have since appealed the ruling on December 10, 2024. The main trial at the Svea Court of Appeal is scheduled for late January 2026. Erik Fenn served on the front lines in the war in Ukraine, where he died on June 31, 2025.

In 2025, a 17-year-old named Samantha was rejected from Swedish military conscription solely because of her autism diagnosis, a decision she calls a "disappointment". Samantha, who views her autism and ADHD as strengths, feels it is unfair that she is barred from serving while some of her friends who were selected have no desire to join the military.

As of March 18, 2025, Swedish military authorities are facing seven lawsuits alleging that their rejection of military enlistment applications from individuals with autism violated anti-discrimination laws.

==== Denmark ====
In Denmark, health grades for military service are classified on a scale from 0 to 5. A higher grade (closer to 5) indicates a person is healthier and more suitable for military service. Individuals with a grade of 2 or lower are considered unfit for military service, and grades of 0 and 1 are unconditionally classified as unfit for service. While a rating of "0 – (4)" typically results in exclusion from military service, an individual can be permitted to serve if they can prove a special "just cause", which qualifies them as fit for duty.

Denmark's conscription policy classifies individuals with an autism diagnosis (including infantile autism) as "0" ("unfit for military service"), and they are consequently excluded from conscription.

An exception is made, however, for individuals diagnosed with Asperger's syndrome, who receive a rating of "0 – (4)". Even for this group, military service is only permitted if a "just cause for military service" can be proven; otherwise, they are also classified as "unfit for military service" and cannot serve.

==== Norway ====
In Norway, individuals must fill out a questionnaire before military enlistment. On this questionnaire, autism is included in the same category as conditions like Down syndrome. As a result, even those with a very mild form of autism may be deemed unfit during the conscription process and be unable to serve.

==== Israel ====
In Israel until 2017, individuals with a diagnosis of autism and a disability rating of at least a 100 % have been exempt from military service 2017. Individuals with autism who did not meet that rating were generally drafted and given profile 45 or 64. In July 2021, after the Titkadmu (Move Forwards) program was launched, approximately 200 individuals with high-functioning autism volunteered for military service.

Additionally, a program called Ro'im Rachok allows individuals to apply as military volunteers. As part of the program, Unit 9900 of the Military Intelligence Directorate has a subunit consisting of autistic servicemen for imagery and geospatial intelligence duties.

=== Countries with conscription for men only ===
==== Finland ====
Prior to the 2010s, Finnish military authorities typically exempted men with a confirmed autism diagnosis from conscription. However, this policy began to change in the 2010s, when even men with a confirmed diagnosis started to be included as conscription candidates. According to a 2019 report from Finland's Defence Forces' news magazine, autistic individuals are no longer exempt from conscription and are now drafted into the Finnish military.

Finland's Defence Forces' news magazine claimed that conscripted individuals with autism spectrum disorders had a positive view of their service, arguing that the conscription of autistic people has positive effects.

==== Ukraine ====
In Ukraine, individuals with a mild and moderate severity of autism spectrum disorder are eligible for conscription, but are assigned to non-combat roles rather than being sent to the front line.

Parents often feel despair when their sons with moderate autism spectrum disorder are deemed fit for military service and subsequently conscripted. Although parents of autistic sons are aware that everyday demands can lead to a "terrible collapse with unpredictable consequences" for even those with mild autism, they cannot get them exempted from the draft.

==== South Korea ====
In South Korea, military service is classified into grades 1 through 7. The majority of those in grades 1 through 4 are required to serve as active-duty soldiers. A grade 1 classification makes active duty highly likely, with the possibility of serving decreasing as the grade number increases. Even those who are exempted from active duty must still register for the reserve forces and participate in regular military training. The South Korean Ministry of National Defense initially classified individuals with autism and Asperger's syndrome as Grade 3. However, starting on February 1, 2018, this was revised to a Grade 4 classification. Until February 1, 2018, most individuals with autism who did not have an intellectual disability were required to serve on active duty by South Korean military authorities. In peacetime, Koreans with autism are exempt from active-duty service but must still perform reserve duty.

==== Turkey ====
In Turkey, while individuals with autism are officially exempt from conscription, this policy is sometimes disregarded in practice, and they may be suspected of draft evasion. To clear these allegations, individuals with autism and their families often have to go through very difficult administrative procedures.

One non-verbal individual with autism was suspected of draft evasion. To prove their son's disability, his parents had to get him examined three separate times and submit new medical certificates.

==== Taiwan ====
In Taiwan, individuals who are diagnosed with autism are exempt from military service.

=== Countries with an all-volunteer military ===
==== United States of America ====
The Department of Defense has an official policy that excludes all autistic individuals from military service. In reality, individuals with autism who apply to join the U.S. military are disqualified during the screening process.

A soldier who is diagnosed with autism while already on active duty may continue to serve instead of being discharged. After serving in the U.S. Air Force for nearly a decade, including multiple tours in the Middle East, Major Daniel Kiser was diagnosed with autism. With the support of his superiors, he was able to continue his service as an instructor, and he credits his autism with helping him in his role. Service members with autism are often diagnosed in secret after they join the military, and they believe that their successful careers could be jeopardized if their condition becomes known.

Neurodiversity advocates argue that military enlistment standards should be revised and that the military itself should be reorganized to better accommodate neurodivergent individuals. Cortney Weinbaum argues that the military should embrace neurodiversity for the sake of U.S. national security.

Cortney Weinbaum, Omair Khan, Teresa D. Thomas, and Bradley D. Stein, in their research, assert that embracing neurodiversity can enhance U.S. national security. They contend that the U.S. government is wrong to treat neurodivergent individuals as disabled and that the military should redesign its structure with neurodiversity in mind. Their recommendations include: Providing equal accommodations to all employees to lessen the impact of sensory stimuli. Creating specific, jargon-free job descriptions for neurodivergent applicants and improving interview processes. Educating all staff on neurodiversity. Systematically reforming the military organization to be neurodiversity-friendly.

However if conscription were to be reinstated in the United States, individuals with autism could be drafted and even serve if they pass physical examination despite the rule normally excluding all individuals with autism. However, those with moderate to severe autism would likely find it difficult to pass the physical examination.

==== Poland ====
The Polish Ministry of National Defence rejects active military service for individuals with autism spectrum disorder. However, they are not automatically excluded from being candidates for active duty in the Territorial Defence Force. Furthermore, individuals with autism are permitted to work as civilian employees for the Ministry of National Defence.
