= Military stress card =

American urban legend

The military stress card was a rumored "Get out of jail free" card said to have allowed United States basic training recruits to halt their training at will by showing the card, probably originating with a United States Navy "Blues Card", a short-term experiment by the United States Navy to inform new recruits about available mental health resources. Although these cards were only issued for a brief period during the 1990s, the rumor that trainees in all services were issued cards became urban legend. Both Snopes.com and Stars and Stripes confirmed that a card to halt training was a myth.

A Time magazine editorial said a card was issued for this purpose by the Navy for recruits heading to boot camp at RTC Great Lakes. Whether urban legend or not, the purported use of them in boot camp has been cited as evidence of the softening of U.S. military forces, degrading readiness to fight.

== Background ==
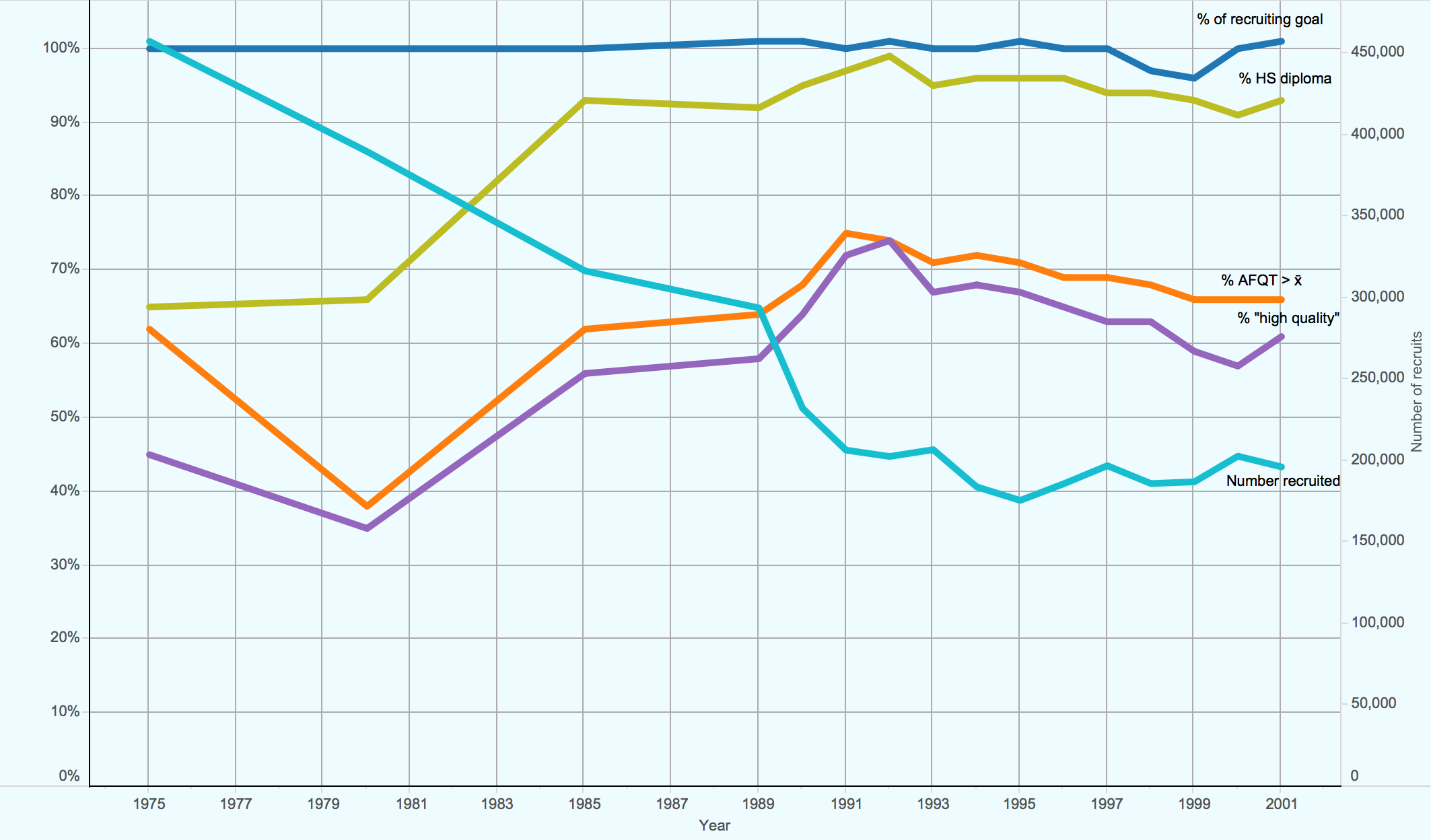
Trends in recruiting 1975-2001 showing total numbers of enlisted recruits in all branches of US armed forces in light blue and percentage of recruiting goals met in dark blue. Percentage of recruits with at least a high school diploma is shown in gold, percentage with an above average AFQT in orange,^{*} and the percentage called "high quality", with both a diploma and above-average AFQT score, is in purple.

The stress cards were said to have appeared during the 1990s. Some of those saying basic training had "gone soft" said it was due to "relaxed standards of physical performance and sexual tensions" caused by the integration of women into basic training in the Navy in 1992 and the Army in 1994; the Air Force had been so integrated 1977. The cards were also associated with what some critics said was an overtly proactive effort to combat sexual harassment in response to the 1991 Tailhook scandal.

The Navy's informational card was titled "Blues Card", listing options like the Chaplain and, Navy C.A.R.E./R.E.U. (Recruit Evaluation Unit) and RDCs (Recruit Division Commander, meaning drill instructor), telling recruits to seek help when feeling depressed or thinking of hurting themselves. The card also says "Present this card to your RDC". Later rumors, denied by several authorities, said that the card itself was a signal, and when presented to the drill instructor they were obligated to halt training. The cards were referred to as "the blue card", either descriptive of the blue color or a variation of the "Blues Card" title. In 2005, the 7th Fleet introduced the Liberty (shore leave) Card Program, using various colored cards, including a "blue card" totally unrelated to the short-lived basic training experiment from a decade earlier.

Though all branches of the armed services met or exceeded their recruiting goals through this period, recruit quality fell from the peak reached in 1992. "High quality" enlisted recruits, defined as having both a high school diploma and an above average Armed Forces Qualification Test (AFQT) score were far lower in the 1970s, rising through the 1993 establishment of the first minimum requirement for recruit quality, which was met every year since, in spite of dropping in subsequent years.^{*} Possible explanations offered in hindsight were waning public enthusiasm for the military in the years immediately following the successful Gulf War (1990-1991), which coincided with decreasing unemployment and better civilian pay relative to the military; more high school graduates attending college instead of enlisting; and a perceived drop in quality of life and job satisfaction in the military. Even at their lowest point in 2000, these statistical measures of recruit quality remained well above those of the 1970s and early to mid 1980s.

== Notes ==
- The population that takes the AFQT is larger than the population that of those who subsequently enlist, allowing for a large majority of enlistees to be above average, compared to population including both enlistees and non-enlistees.
