= Shaarei Ha'esh Battalion (Israel) =

Reserve battalion of the Israel Defence Forces

Unit 9300
- Active: 2018-present
- Country: Israel
- Branch: Israel Defense Forces
- Type: Reserve unit
- Role: Border protection
- Size: Battalion
- Part of: Baram Brigade

Commanders
- Current commander: Lt. Col. (res.) Noam Aharon

The Shaarei Ha’esh Battalion, also Unit 9300, is a reserve battalion of the Israel Defense Forces.

== History ==
The unit is part of the regional Baram Brigade. Personnel of the Unit 9300 consists of reservists freshly released from the reconnaissance battalion of the Golani Brigade.

According Colonel Roi Levi, commander of the Baram Brigade, the battalion serves the purpose of defending communities near the Israeli-Lebanon border and provide attack resources against Hezbollah.

== See also ==
- Reserve duty (Israel)
