= Hanna Rieber =

Israeli actress

- חנה ריבר
- Born: 28 January 1927; Romania
- Died: 9 September 2014 (aged 87); Tel Aviv, Israel
- Occupation: Actress

Hanna Rieber (Hebrew: חנה ריבר; 28 January 1927 – 9 September 2014) was a Romanian-born Israeli actress of stage, screen and television. She performed on stage at the Haifa Municipal Theatre, the Orna Porat Children's Theater, the Beersheba Theater (of which the latter three she co-established) and the Yiddishpiel. Rieber was awarded the Fringe Lifetime Achievement Award by the Golden Hedgehog Association for her work and contribution to the non-institutional theater field in 2013.

== Biography ==
Rieber was born in Romania on 28 January 1927. She had one brother. Rieber began her career in acting at the Bucharest Yiddish Studio Theater from which she would later graduate. There, she had roles in The Threepenny Opera and The Diary of Anne Frank and earned the National Award for Acting as a result. In 1963, Rieber emigrated to Israel when she was at the age of 37.

She was a co-founder of the Haifa Municipal Theatre, the Orna Porat Children's Theater and the Beersheba Theater, and also acted at the same establishments. Rieber also acted in various other theatres that were either small or institutionalised across Israel such as the library theatre. At the Haifa Municipal Theatre, she performed such roles in the plays The Rose Tattoo by Tennessee Williams and Hillel Mittelpunkt's Parcels from America, Sodom and Gomorrah, Pygmalion, Peter Pan, Uncle Vanya, Richard III and Hedda Gabler among others. Rieber performed in the plays Tales from the Vienna Woods, Drums in the Night, Hunting Pictures, Mephisto and Poetry, and Juno and the Paycock at the Beer Sheva Municipal Theatre. She also had roles in the plays Le Bourgeois gentilhomme and Conversations with My Father at the Beit Lessin Theater. Rieber also performed at the Yiddishpiel, having roles in Sweet Days of Winter, The Enchanted Tailor, 8 Women and It's Hard to be a Jew among others. At the Children's and Youth Theater she starred in the plays Sarah, the Heroine of Nili, The Magic Peacock and Gan Dror as well as having roles in True West, Whale Song, and The Gobler at the Library Theatre.

Rieber also had roles in cinema and television. She played the role of Mrs. Zimmerman in the 1972 film Salomonico, Anita in We Are Judges in 1975, the grocery store owner in The Cowards in 1981, the buyer in the following year's film Michel Ezra Safra and Sons, Kayitz Etzel Erika in 1992, Vania in the 1995 television series Sipurey Efraim and the 1995 film Devarim. Rieber has a guest role in the 1999 television series Tironoot, and as a grandmother in the 2005 Cannes Film Festival winning entrant, the student film Visiting Hours. In 2009, she played the role of the comfort in the film On the Way to the Cats. The following year, Rieber was in the television series Hakol Dvash and House Arrest and was cast as Mrs. Trachtenberg for the 2012 sitcom Bnot HaZahav. The next year, she played Malka Shtisel in the first season of the television drama Shtisel. In 2014, Rieber had roles in Metim LeRega as Miriam, Ruhama in The Farewell Party, Bird in Hanna's Journey the grandmother in Grounded and in Atlit. Her final film role was playing the role of Hanga in the 2014 production Anywhere Else. She was a member of Shaham and was on the council of the National Authority for Yiddish Culture. Rieber received the Fringe Lifetime Achievement Award by the Golden Hedgehog Association for her work and contribution to the non-institutional theatre field in 2013.

== Personal life ==
On the morning of 9 September 2014, Rieber died at her home in Tel Aviv. She was given a funeral at Holon Cemetery one day later.
