= Benad Goldwasser =

Israeli urologic surgeon

- בּנְעָד גוֹלְדוָוסֵר
- Born: 1 November 1950 (age 75); Israel
- Occupations: Urologic surgeon and investor

Benad Goldwasser (Hebrew: בּנְעָד גוֹלְדוָוסֵר; born 1 November 1950) is an Israeli urologic surgeon and businessman. He was CEO and chairman for a number of healthcare related companies.

== Biography ==
Goldwasser was born in Israel. In 1975 he obtained his MD degree from Tel-Aviv University.

Between 1975 and 1978 Goldwasser served in the Israeli army in a tank corp division. In 1982 while on reserve duty he was severely injured at Beirut Airport and was honorably discharged with the rank of Major. After serving in the Israel Defense Forces, he began 1978 his urology residency at the Sheba Medical Center in Tel Hashomer. In 1984 he spent a year at Duke University Medical Center as a post-graduate fellow, and in the following year he attended another fellowship at the Mayo Clinic where he developed a technique of replacing the urinary bladder with a reconstructed segment of large bowel for patients whose bladder was removed due to invasive cancer. Immediately upon his return to Israel in 1987 Goldwasser was appointed the chairman of the Urology Department at the Chaim Sheba Medical Center and Professor of Surgery at Tel Aviv University. He worked in this position until 1996 when he left the practice of medicine to pursue a business career. In 1997 he obtained an MBA degree from Tel-Aviv University's School of Management. In February 2021 he was chairman of Inspira Technologies. (NASDAQ: IINN/IINNW).

=== Authored books and publications ===
During his medical and academic career Goldwasser was the author and co-author of more than 120 articles published in peer reviewed journals, and of 19 chapters in books concerning urology. He was also a co-editor of two books on the subject of reconstructive urology.
