= Project 100,000 =

1960s U.S. military recruitment program

- Date: October 1966 – December 1971
- Location: United States
- Also known as: McNamara's Morons
- Type: Disability draft
- Cause: Vietnam War
- Organised by: United States Department of Defense
- Mobilization plan: To recruit people below military, mental or medical standards into the United States Armed Forces
- Number mobilized: 320,000–354,000

Project 100,000, also known as McNamara's 100,000, McNamara's Folly, McNamara's Morons, and McNamara's Misfits, was a controversial 1960s program by the United States Department of Defense (DoD) to recruit soldiers who would previously have been below military mental or medical standards. Project 100,000 was initiated by Defense Secretary Robert McNamara in October 1966 to meet the escalating workforce requirements of the U.S. government's involvement in the Vietnam War. According to Hamilton Gregory, author of the book McNamara's Folly: The Use of Low-IQ Troops in the Vietnam War, inductees of the project died at three times the rate of other Americans serving in Vietnam and, following their service, had lower incomes and higher rates of divorce than their non-veteran counterparts. The project was ended in December 1971.

== Background ==
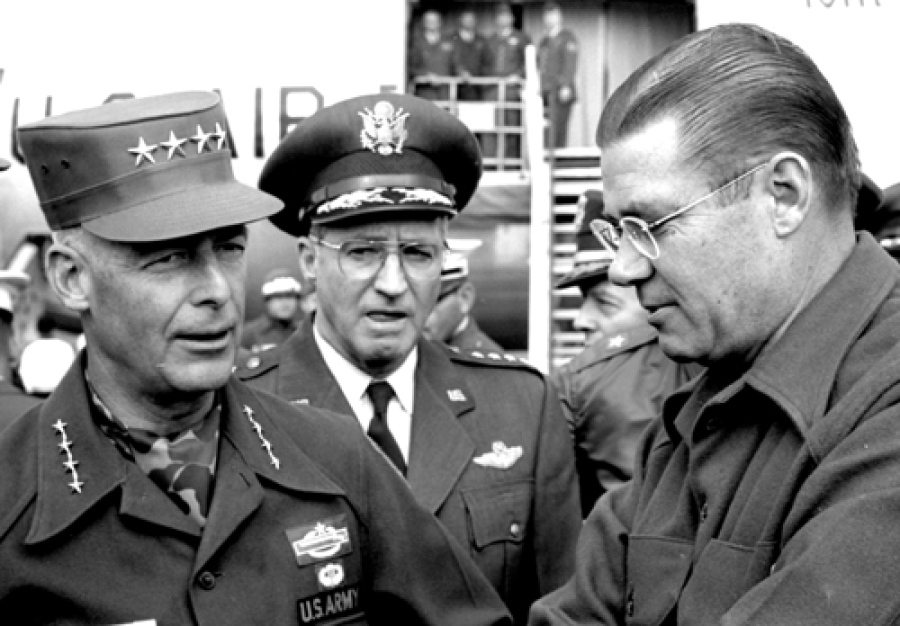
U.S. Secretary of Defense Robert McNamara being greeted by General Paul L. Freeman Jr. during a visit to Rhein-Main Air Base in Frankfurt, West Germany, 1962

At various times, the United States Armed Forces has recruited people who measured below specific mental and medical standards. During World War II, those who scored in certain lower percentiles of mental aptitude tests were admitted into service. However, this experience eventually led to a legal floor of IQ 80 to enlist. Another instance occurred in the 1980s due to an error in setting the score norm on the Armed Services Vocational Aptitude Battery.

President John F. Kennedy created the Task Force on Manpower Conservation in 1963 to look into draft eligibility issues. The task force, which included Defense Secretary Robert McNamara, found that "one-third of all young men in the nation turning 18 [years old] would be found unqualified if they were to be examined for induction into the armed forces". Of the third, half were due to men failing the Armed Forces Qualification Test. As a result, the army developed the voluntary Special Training and Enlistment Program in 1964, which provided additional and specialized instruction to men who had failed to meet the eligibility requirements. $16 million was requested by President Lyndon B. Johnson to fund the project, which Congress declined, believing the Army was overstepping into education. McNamara, who had proposed the project, would later use it as the basis for Project 100,000.

By October 1966, monthly draft calls had been steadily increasing for 15 consecutive months; it stood at 49,300, the highest since early 1951, the peak mobilization period of the Korean War, when 80,000 men a month were called up. In a series of decisions, the Pentagon lowered its required score for induction on the Armed Forces Qualification Test to as low as the 10th percentile – a 6% drop.

According to Hamilton Gregory, author of McNamara's Folly: The Use of Low-IQ Troops in the Vietnam War:

McNamara was a lover of technology ... McNamara believed he could win the war in Vietnam through the use of advanced technology and computerized analysis ... And he believed he could raise the intelligence of men through the use of video tapes.

== Project ==
McNamara announced Project 100,000 in a speech on August 23, 1966, saying that the poor could be "salvage[d] . . . first for productive military careers and later for productive roles in society", and the project began in October. Promoted as a response to President Lyndon B. Johnson's War on Poverty by giving training and opportunity to the uneducated and poor, the recruited men were classified as "New Standards Men" (or, pejoratively, as the "Moron Corps"). They had scored in Category IV of the Armed Forces Qualification Test, which placed them in the 10th–30th percentile range. The number of soldiers reportedly recruited through the program varies, from more than 320,000 to 354,000, which included both voluntary enlistees and draftees (54% and 46%, respectively). Entrance requirements were loosened, but all the Project 100,000 men were sent through normal training programs with other recruits, and performance standards thus were the same for everyone. The U.S. Army received 71% of recruits, followed by 10% by the Marines, 10% by the Navy, and 9% by the Air Force.

Project 100,000 soldiers included those unable to speak English, those who had low mental aptitude or minor physical impairments, and those who were slightly over- or underweight. They also included a special category made up of a control group of "normal" soldiers. Each category was identified in the soldiers' official personnel records by a large red letter stamped on the first page of their enlistment contracts. Human resources offices had to prepare reports on them to be submitted monthly to the Department of the Army. The monthly reports did not disclose the identity of the soldiers.

== Aftermath ==
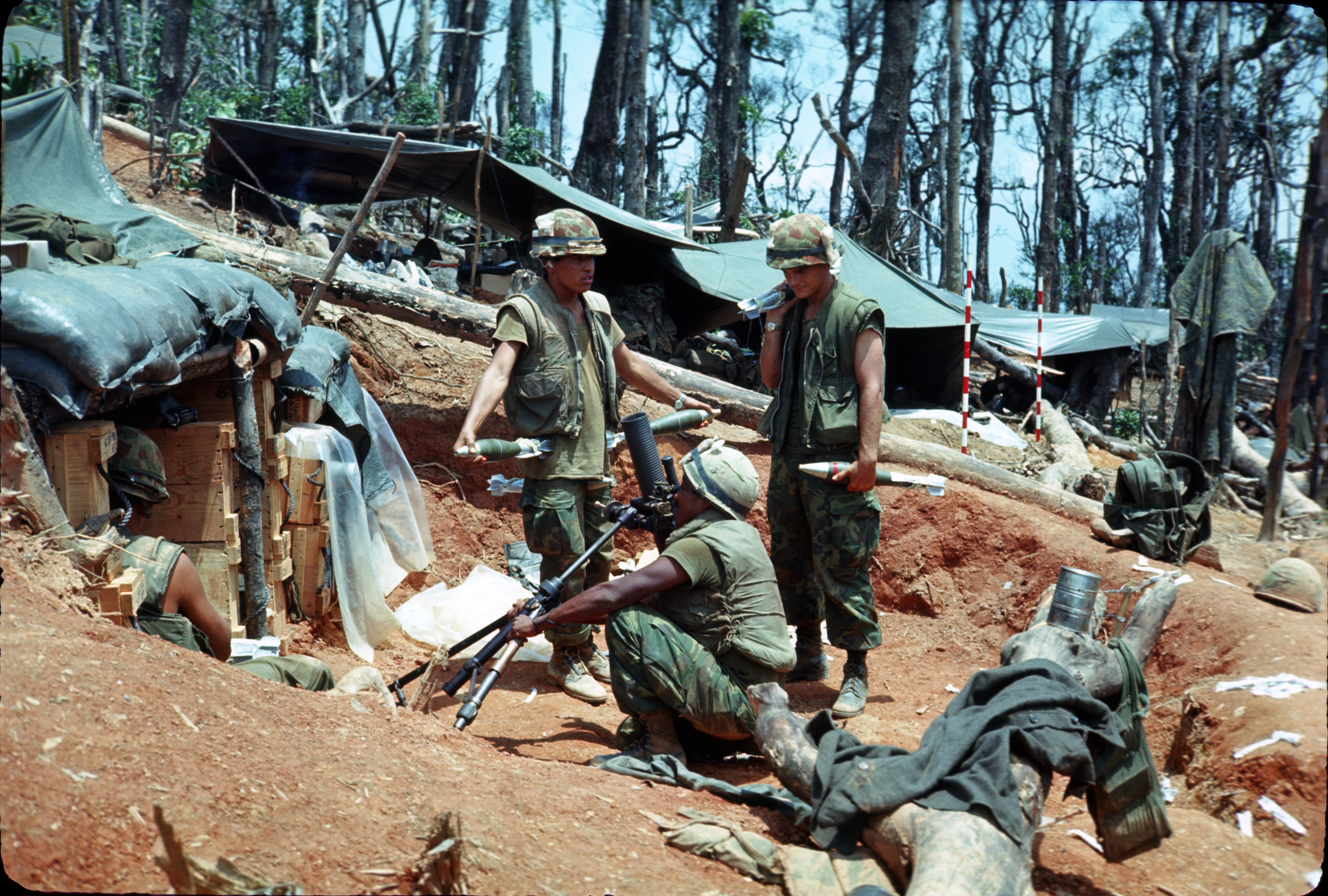
U.S. Marine Corps mortar platoon in April 1969, the month when U.S. presence in Vietnam peaked with 543,000 deployed troops

While the project was promoted as a response to President Lyndon B. Johnson's war on poverty, it has been an object of criticism. Regarding the consequences of the program, a 1989 study sponsored by the DoD concluded:

Comparisons between Project 100,000 participants and their non-veteran peers showed that, in terms of employment status, educational achievement, and income, non-veterans appeared better off. Veterans were more likely to be unemployed and to have a significantly lower level of education. Income differences ranged from $5,000 [to] $7,000 in favor of non-veterans. Veterans were more likely to have been divorced.

A 1995 review by Myra MacPherson in Washington Monthly of McNamara's book, In Retrospect: The Tragedy and Lessons of Vietnam, severely criticized the project, saying that "the program offered a one-way ticket to Vietnam, where these men fought and died in disproportionate numbers ... the men of the 'Moron Corps' provided the necessary cannon fodder to help evade the political horror of dropping student deferments or calling up the reserves, which were sanctuaries for the lily-white."

Project 100,000 was highlighted in a 2006 op-ed in The New York Times in which former Wesleyan assistant professor and then Tufts assistant professor Kelly M. Greenhill, writing in the context of a contemporary recruitment shortfall, concluded that "Project 100,000 was a failed experiment. It proved to be a distraction for the military and of little benefit to the men it was created to help." To explain why veterans from the project fared worse in civilian life than their non-veteran peers, Greenhill hypothesized it might be related to the psychological consequences of combat or unpreparedness for the post-military transition.

== See also ==
- Catch-22
- Disability draft
- Forrest Gump
- Full Metal Jacket
- Intelligence and public policy
- McNamara fallacy
