= Ro'im Rachok =

Israeli military training program for autistic people

Ro'im Rachok (Hebrew: רואים רחוק, lit. 'looking ahead') is a program designed to train young autistic adults in professions by the Israel Defense Forces. Qualified young adults, who want to volunteer for service in the IDF or integrate into the job market, are taught professions for which they have a comparative advantage.

Military service is mandatory in Israel for almost all citizens, but teenagers on the autism spectrum (and some with disabilities) are exempt.

The first graduates of the program learned to analyze aerial and satellite photographs in cooperation with Unit 9900. Later the program expanded and currently it trains for professions like Software QA, Information sorting Electro-optics and Electronics. The soldiers serve in more than 10 units in the Israeli Intelligence Community, Israeli Air Force and more. In 2016 the program had roughly 50 individuals.

The program is operated in cooperation with Beyond the Horizon and Ono Academic College.

== History ==
Ro'im Rachok was founded in 2013 by two Mossad veterans who realized that certain individuals on the autism spectrum could be unusually skilled at spending long hours analyzing aerial reconnaissance photographs and picking out tiny details. In addition to its military benefits, there are social benefits to the program. This poses a barrier to advancement in their lives as military service is a significant step in Israeli society for young men, both symbolically as well as professionally.

Now, the military increasingly looks at autistic individuals with low support needs as potentially useful. Rather than forcing individuals to remain enlisted for the standard three years, Ro'im Rachok gives individuals the option to enlist in one-year increments once their three-month training is complete. When enlisted, the soldiers are accompanied by a therapist as well as a psychologist for their own benefit as well as to accommodate for some social barriers their commanders and colleagues may encounter.

The program also helps to prepare young autistic adults for their futures with training on how to deal with challenging situations related to their civilian life such as public transportation. The program also helps to prepare people for future careers in technological fields and careers. Ro'im Rachok aims to utilize skills people on the autism spectrum exhibit, as well as end stigma surrounding autism.
