= Conscription of people with disabilities =

Conscripting of disabled persons for military service

Although people with disabilities are generally exempt from military service, conscription of people with disabilities has occurred on various occasions historically.

== Instances ==
During the Second Sino-Japanese War, more than 480 people with intellectual disabilities were conscripted into the military of Imperial Japan.

The 6th CC.NN. Division "Tevere" which fought in the Second Italo-Ethiopian War had soldiers in its ranks who were amputees.

Project 100,000 was a disability draft under the Johnson Administration. Men who had previously been rejected from military service due to physical or mental disabilities were re-classified and sent to the frontlines in the Vietnam War.

In 2023, two United States Senators made inquiries as to whether or not the military's migration to an Electronic health record system disrupted recruitment numbers.

=== Ukraine ===
Numerous Ukrainians with disabilities have been drafted over the course of the Russian invasion of Ukraine. The Ukrainian Defence Ministry amended the criteria for medical exemptions, reclassifying people with tuberculosis, viral hepatitis, thyroid disease and HIV to be fit for military service. On 22 October 2024, Ukrainian president Zelenskyy signed a decree which dissolved the medical examination commissions for determining the severity of disabilities that qualified for military exemptions. 8 July 2025, the Council of Europe's Commissioner for Human Rights published a report which said there were systemic human rights violations during mobilization, which included reports of beatings, selective recruitment, and the conscription of people with disabilities.

According to an unnamed Ukrainian brigade commander who spoke to Deutsche Welle on condition of anonymity, some people who had been drafted showed up to the training center with edentulism and tuberculosis. According to a soldier who identified himself as "Kyrylo" to Deutsche Welle, he saw homeless people with swollen legs, drug addicts and alcoholics being drafted. "Kyrylo" also told DW that the medical exam is "often just a formality and in some places, it doesn't even happen" though he also mentioned that a "more thorough medical examination" would be carried out at a training center. According to another soldier who identified himself as "Oleksandr", he saw people with epilepsy and schizophrenia being drafted. "Oleksandr" also reported that in 2024, a man with schizophrenia was assigned to a brigade in the Ukrainian Marine Corps and was later identified as having schizophrenia during basic training.

== See also ==
- Conscription
- Disability abuse
- McNamara fallacy
- Military service and conscription for autistic people
- Project 100,000
