= Reserve duty (Israel) =

Israeli residents after military service

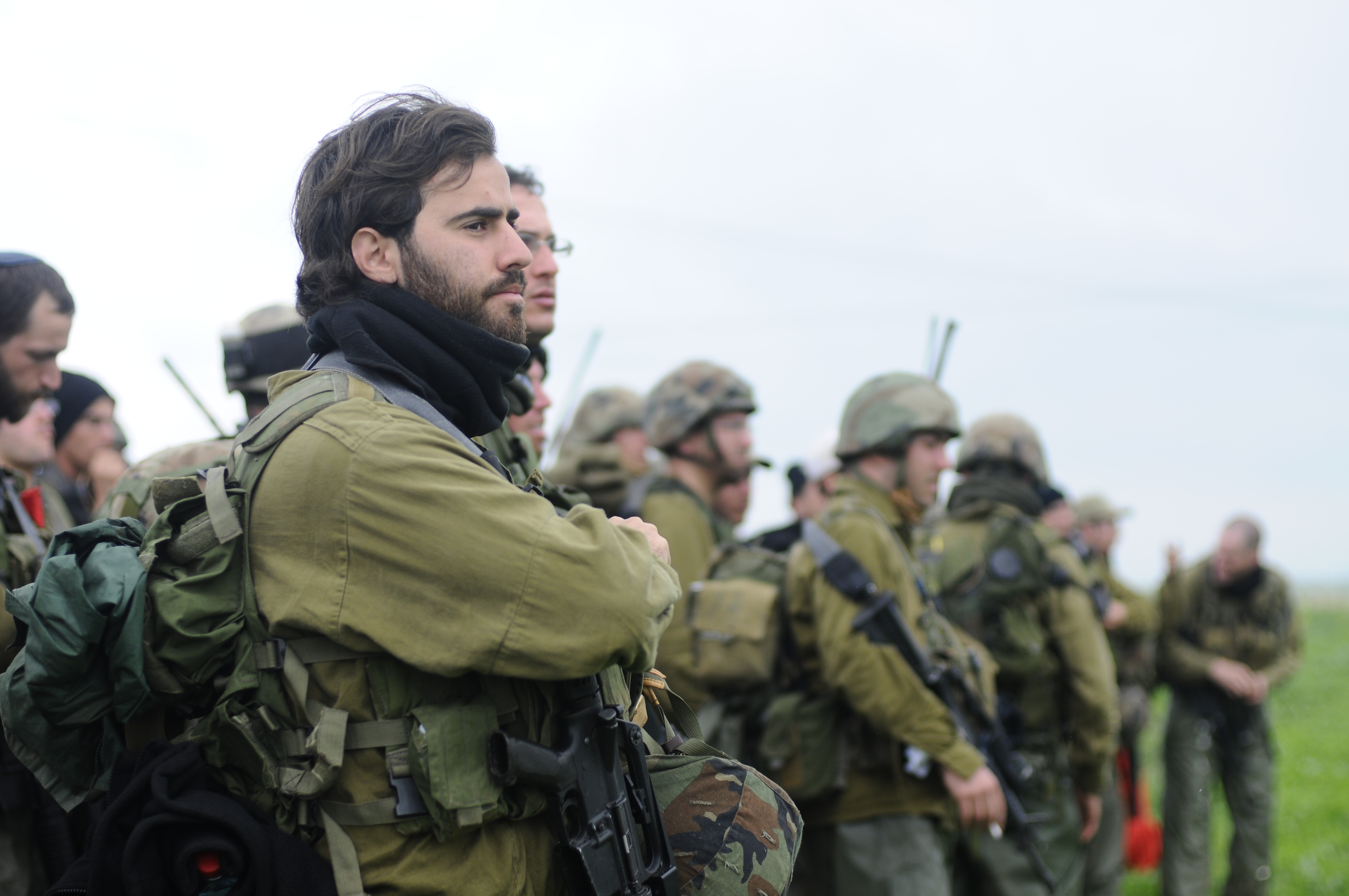
Reservists of the Israel Defense Forces in 2011

In reserve duty (or reserve service; Hebrew: שירות מילואים, Sherut Milu'im), Israeli residents who have completed military service are assigned to the Israel Defense Forces' military reserve force to provide reinforcements during emergencies (war, military operations or natural disasters), and as a matter of routine course (e.g. for training, ongoing security and other activities). Some reservists are assigned to the same units they served in during their regular military service, and some are assigned to dedicated reserve units.

Within the IDF's Personnel Directorate, the professional officer in charge of the reserve army is the Commander of Reserve Forces Corps (abbreviated קמל"ר; "Kamlar"), an officer with the rank of Brigadier General.

For many years, reserve service had been implemented under the "Defense Service Law", but since 1 August 2008 it has been implemented mainly under the "Reserve Service Law".

From 2004 onwards Israel has marked "Yom Miluim" (National Reserve Day) on the Lag BaOmer holiday to promote public sympathy for and appreciation of the soldiers serving in the reserve forces.

== Mandatory reserve service in Israel ==
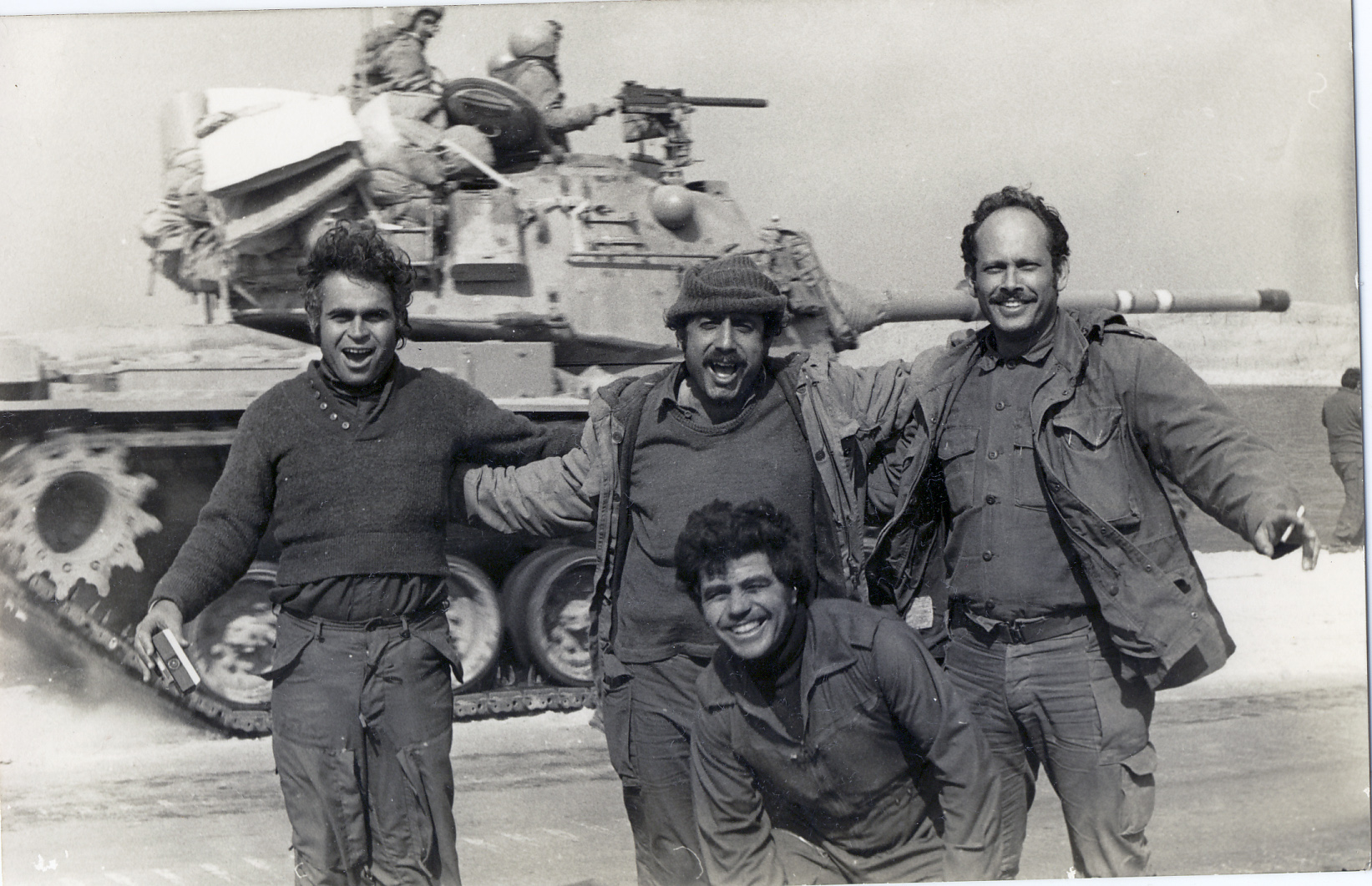
Israeli reservists returning to the Sinai peninsula from the front line following the Yom Kippur War, April 1974

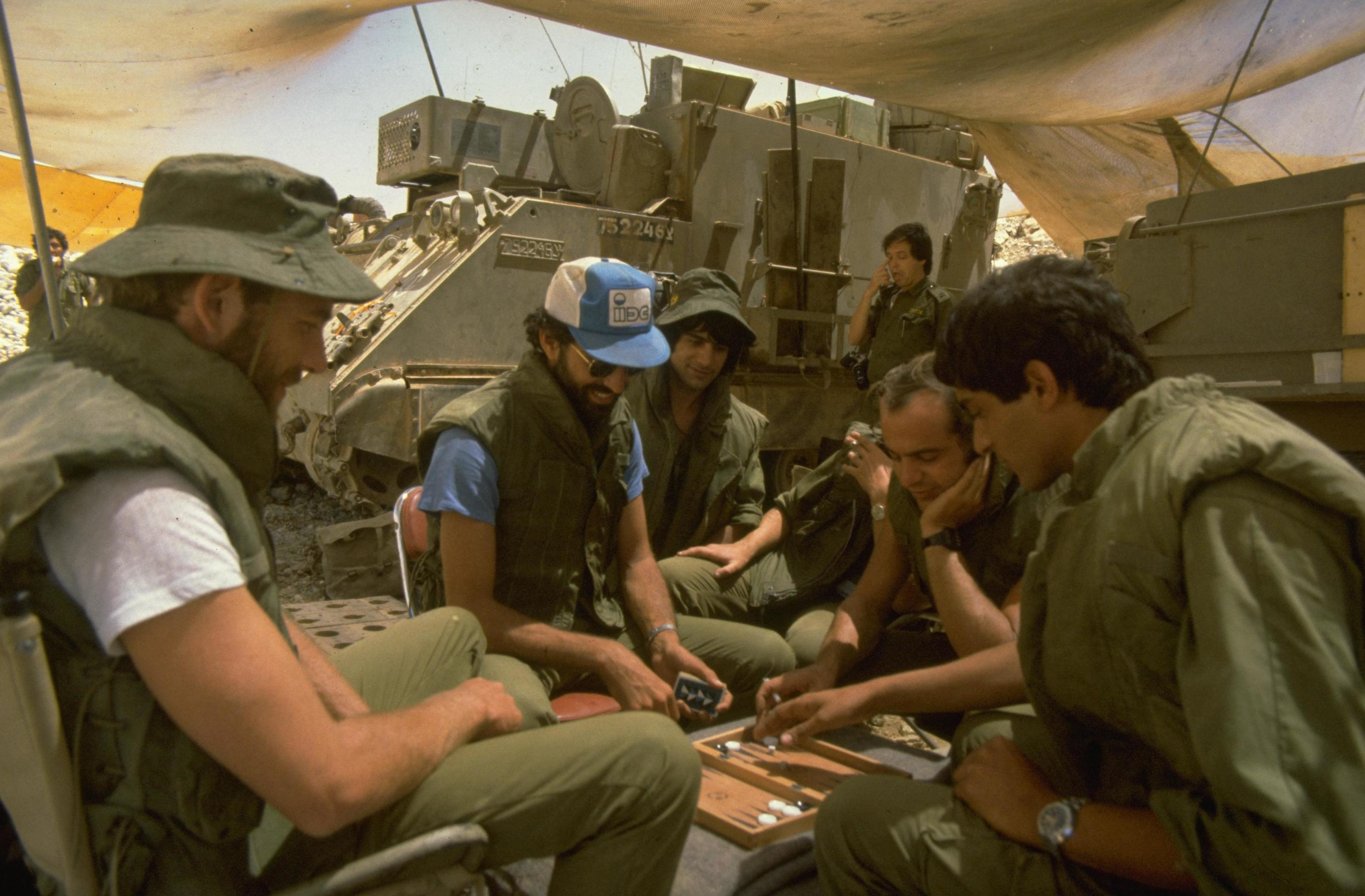
A reserve artillery crew plays backgammon during the 1982 Lebanon War

Reserve service is mandatory in Israel, and is considered part of the national ethos. The actual percentage serving in the IDF reserves has significantly dwindled over the years, and nowadays consists mainly of soldiers who served in one of the IDF combat units during their initial compulsory service.

All Israelis under the age of 40 who served in the IDF, unless otherwise exempt, are theoretically eligible for reserve duty. Women in non-combat positions are released from this obligation upon the birth of their first child. However, only those who completed at least 20 days of reserve service in the past three years are considered to be active reservists. In 2015, about 26% of the population eligible for reserve duty had an active reservist status.

In the past, the age of exemption from reserve duty by the Defense Service Law (חוק שירות ביטחון [נוסח משולב], התשמ"ו-1986) was 54 for men and 38 for women; nevertheless, it was not possible to call up reservists over 41 years of age who had served in a combat unit in the last 10 years or more, or reserve soldiers over the age of 48 who had served in a combat unit for at least 20 years, unless they gave consent for this to happen. Over the years, the IDF has lowered the maximum age at which male reservists are called for reserve duty service, so that the earliest age of exemption for males has become 40 for regular soldiers, 42 for combat officers, 45 for non-combat officers, 48 for soldiers serving in the Regional Defense units (הגמ"ר) and in non-military reservist units, and 51 years-of-age for the reservists serving as physicians in their reserve duty. In 2008 the Knesset approved the Reserve Service Law (חוק שירות המילואים, התשס"ח-2008) which came into effect on 1 August 2008. Accordingly, the age of exemption from reserve duty was reduced for all males, and as a result, ever since then it has stood at 40 for all soldiers, 45 for officers, and 49 for reservists who perform certain specific duties defined as such by the Minister of Defense and approved by the Foreign Affairs and Defense Committee (this mostly includes officials in the medical branch, drivers of heavy equipment, mechanics and technicians).

Although still available for call-up in times of crisis, most men and virtually all women are not called up for reserve duty in any given year, as units do not always call up their reservists every year, and a variety of exemptions are available for regular reserve service, though virtually no exemptions exist for reserve duty in a time of crisis.

The quota of the total reserve days per soldier is also determined in the Defense Service Law, and is defined as being 36 days per year, which the Israeli Minister of Defense has the authority to extend by a further seven days if necessary (and in special cases which are also defined in the law they might extend this period yet further for reservists who hold specific jobs and professions).

The IDF calls its reservists for duty through a special call-up letter (צו קריאה) containing details of the reserve duty they are obliged to undertake, including the relevant dates and location. In cases where these dates might conflict with the work or school schedule of the reservist, they are allowed to appeal to the Reserve Coordination Committee (ולת"ם) who may grant a change to a more convenient time.

In addition to calling up candidates for reserve duty involving training, preparation, and operational employment, the IDF might also call up reservists for duty in circumstances of emergency, via a special immediate order called "Decree 8" (צו 8).

Since 2001 reserve duty is also performed in the Israel Border Police units. Reserve service also applies for units of the Office of the Prime Minister, such as the Shin Bet and the Mossad.

Until the mid-1990s female reservists were very rare in the IDF. Nevertheless, with the opening of many military professions to women, many female soldiers were required to agree to take part in reserve duty after they finish their initial mandatory service in the military as a condition for joining certain positions in the IDF. Women serve until fully exempt from service at age 40, regardless of marital status. Pregnant women, or those with children are given immediate exemption from service, unless they serve in combat roles.

== The reserve duty in the Israeli ethos and in Israeli popular culture ==
In the first four decades following the establishment of the State of Israel, a large part of the Israeli population served in the IDF reserves, and the amount of reserve duty given to each one was relatively high (in most instances one month per year, and sometimes even up to two months per year). As a result, a rich folklore developed surrounding the Israeli reserve service in which the IDF reservist was portrayed as a kind soldier, a little lazy, but with a sense of humour, ingenuity and resourcefulness, who served his country from ideological motives.

=== Film and television ===
One of the most prominent Israeli films depicting the reserve service experience is Assi Dayan's 1976 cult comedy Giv'at Halfon Eina Ona. The film depicts the comic situations resulting from the encounter between the reservists' everyday civilian life, and the rigid world of the military.

In the mid-2000s the TV series Miluim depicted the experiences of the members of a reserve unit called up for service, taking the viewer through their training, strategy, teamwork, and different missions.

=== The reserve duty in Israeli humour ===
A notable feature of Israeli songs dealing with the reserve duty experience is the deeply humorous tone intertwined in describing this way of life. One of the most famous of these songs is "Pgisha BaMiluim" (פגישה במילואים) by Israeli pop group The High Windows, which gained massive and immediate popularity in Israel upon its release in the 1960s.

The prominent Israeli comedy group HaGashash HaHiver also had various skits which focused on the experience of reserve duty in the IDF. One of the most famous of these, "The Drafted Vehicle", portrayed the experiences of three IDF reservists after the Six-Day War, who are in charge of stowing various cars commandeered by the military during the war. Other such famous sketches include "Cooks Discourse", in which two veteran reservist cooks meet and reminisce about the period of the establishment of the State of Israel, together with a non-reserve IDF soldier; and "Pagaz Compote" in which a reservist seeks to be exempted from his upcoming duty because he is getting married.
