= Conscription in Israel =

Since the Israeli Declaration of Independence in 1948, fixed-term military service has been compulsory in Israel. The conscription laws of the Israel Defense Forces (IDF) apply to Jews (males and females), Druze (males only), and Circassians (males only). Because the Druze and Circassian communities are less populous, their women are exempted from mandatory military service altogether. Women from the Jewish community are not exempted, but serve for slightly shorter terms than their male counterparts. The IDF does not conscript non-Druze Arab citizens of Israel, though their men and women may enlist voluntarily.

Unique among the country's Jewish-majority population are the Haredi Jews, who previously enjoyed full exemption from military service through a special arrangement based on the principle of Torato Umanuto, which was organized by Israel's founding prime minister David Ben-Gurion. The arrangement became increasingly controversial in Israeli society, with growing discontent towards the increasingly populous Haredi community not "sharing the burden" of national duty. In June 2024, Israel's Supreme Court unanimously ruled that Haredi Jews were eligible for compulsory service, ending nearly eight decades of exemption. The army began drafting Haredi men the following month.

As of 2022, the minimum required length of military service is two years and eight months (with some roles requiring an additional four months of service) for all conscripted men, and two years (with some roles requiring an additional eight months of service) for conscripted Jewish women. Once they have completed their mandatory term of service, all discharged citizens remain eligible to be called up for reserve duty until the age of 40. Draftees may be exempted from military service on humanitarian, religious, or certain legal grounds.

== History ==
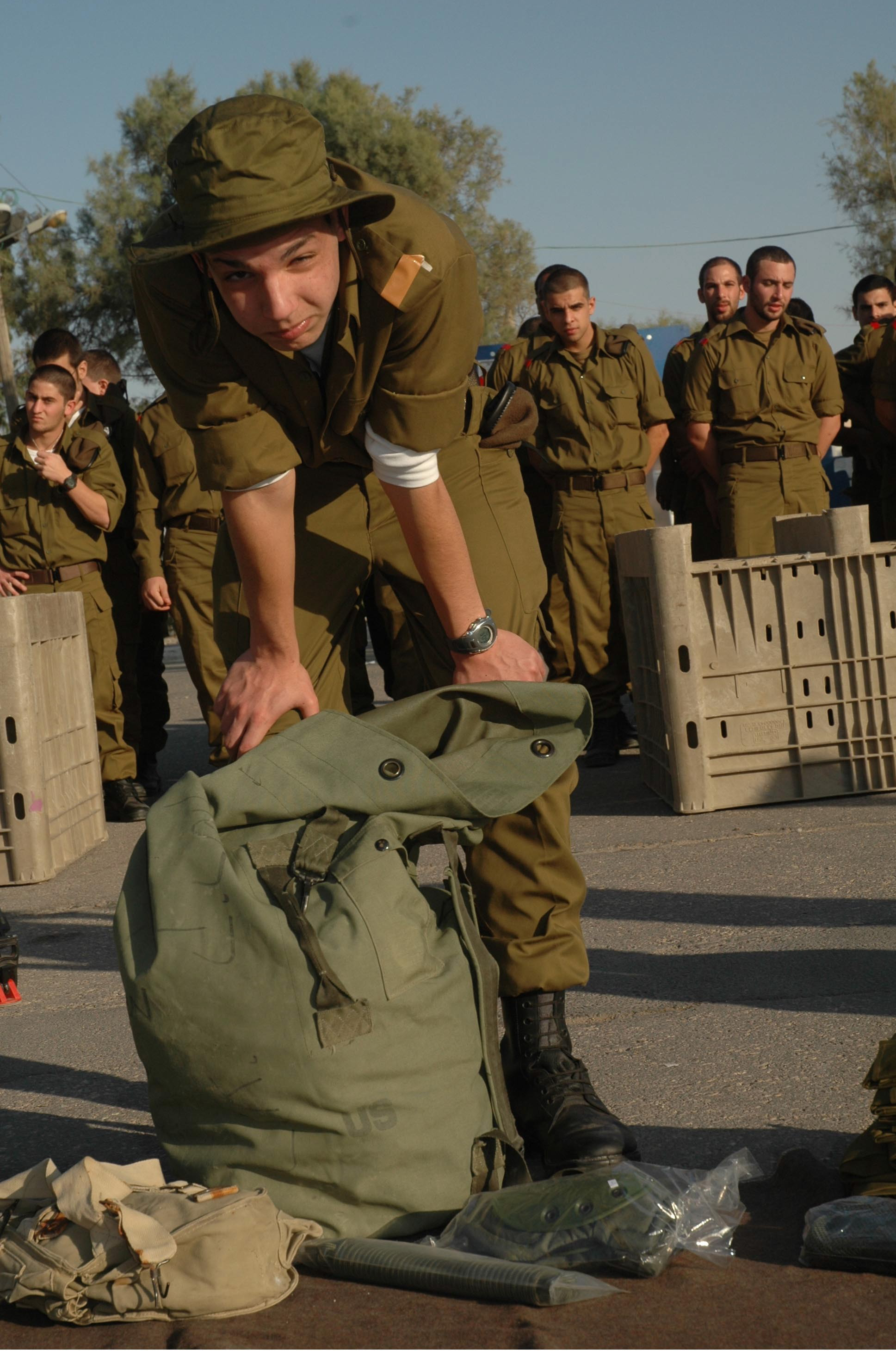
New IDF conscript packing his bag

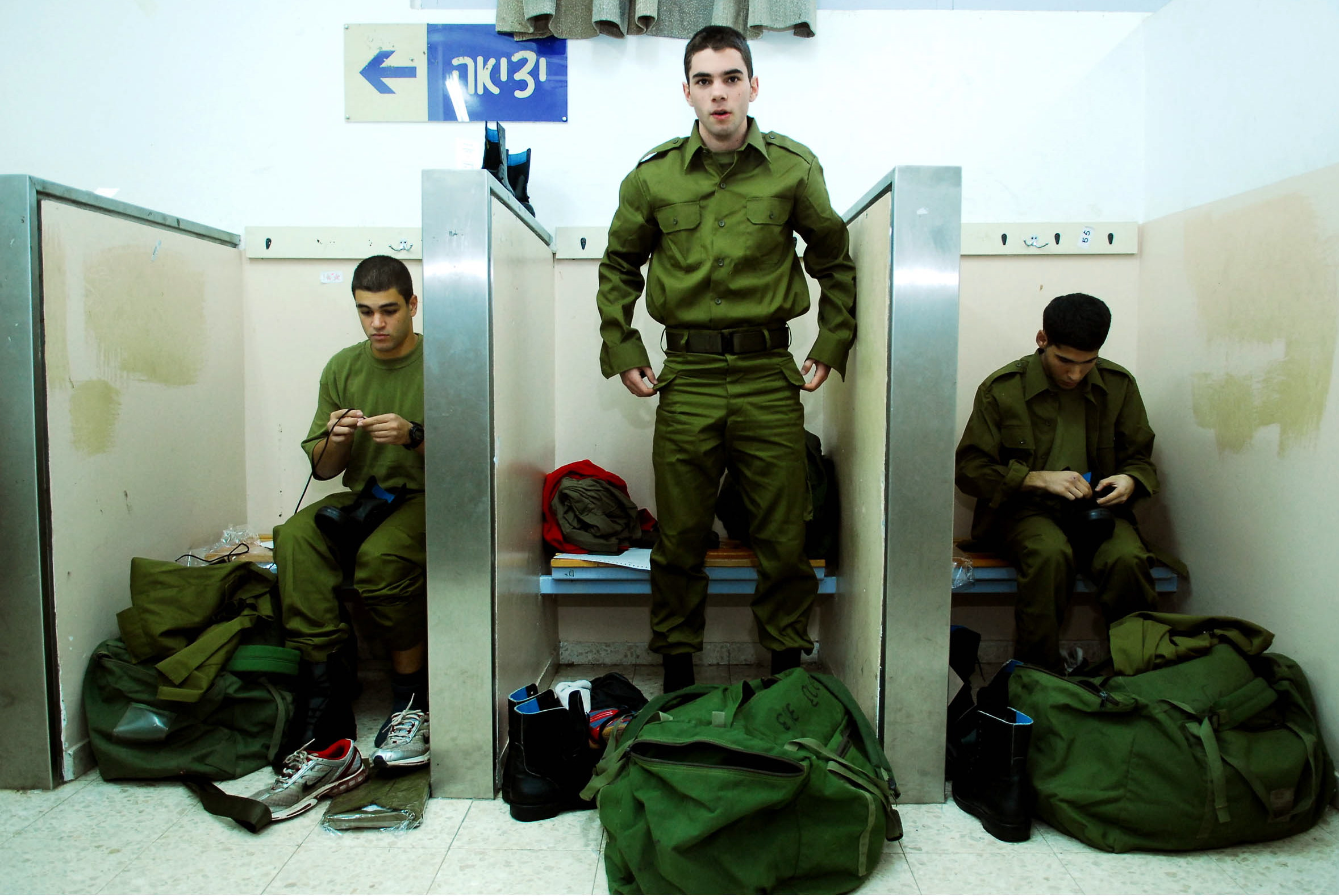
New conscripts trying on uniforms

According to the Israeli Defense Service Law, which regulates duties and exceptions, all Israeli citizens who meet the conscription criteria are required to serve once they reach 18 years of age unless they qualify for any of the above-mentioned exemptions.

In 1949, after the founding of the State of Israel, the Knesset passed the Defense Service Law which gave the IDF the authority to enlist any citizen over the age of 18. Draftees would then be required to show up for the draft in accordance with the military's decision to enlist them. Under this law, the period of service for men was 30 months and for women 18 months (although in accordance with a temporary order from January 10, 1968, six additional months were added to the mandatory service, 36 months for men and 24 months for women respectively). Since 2015, the service for men has been 32 months; in 2020, this was reduced to 30 months following a decision made in 2016, but this change was reverted in 2021 and the reduction was postponed to 2024. The draft requirement applies to any citizen or permanent resident of legal age, and in accordance with the law, the individuals who are exempt from the draft are dismissed for various reasons, such as incapability, medical problems, military personnel needs, etc. Many of the soldiers who complete their mandatory military service are later obligated to serve in a reserve unit in accordance with the military's needs.

Economic constraints on the IDF have caused them to reconsider their structure and slowly shift towards a more modern military. A shift towards a professional militia has caused the IDF to adopt more career-oriented attributes, thus becoming more selective than in prior years. Instead of focusing on “role expansion,” Israel, most specifically its government, is focusing on “nation building.” One of the most recent developments is a focus on inclusivity of gay and especially disabled citizens. In 2013, 26 percent of all potential conscripts were exempted from military service in the Israel Defense Forces; 13.5 percent for religious reasons, 4 percent for psychological reasons, 2 percent for physical health reasons, 3 percent due to existing criminal records, and 3 percent due to residing abroad.

== Medical profiles ==
The IDF determines a medical profile for each soldier; according to that profile, the army decides where to assign the draftees. The highest medical profile draftees serve in the five infantry Brigades, Field/Combat Intelligence units, and Combat engineers. The second highest medical profiles are assigned to serve in the Armoured Corps, Artillery, Military Police, Border Police, and Aman. The lowest acceptable level of medical profiles are drafted into the combat support and combat service support Arms, such as the Adjutant Corps, Logistics Corps, and the Ordnance Corps. Draftees with lower than acceptable profiles (Profile 21) and draftees diagnosed as not suitable for military service are fully exempted from military obligations. The highest profile is 97.

== Grounds for exemption ==
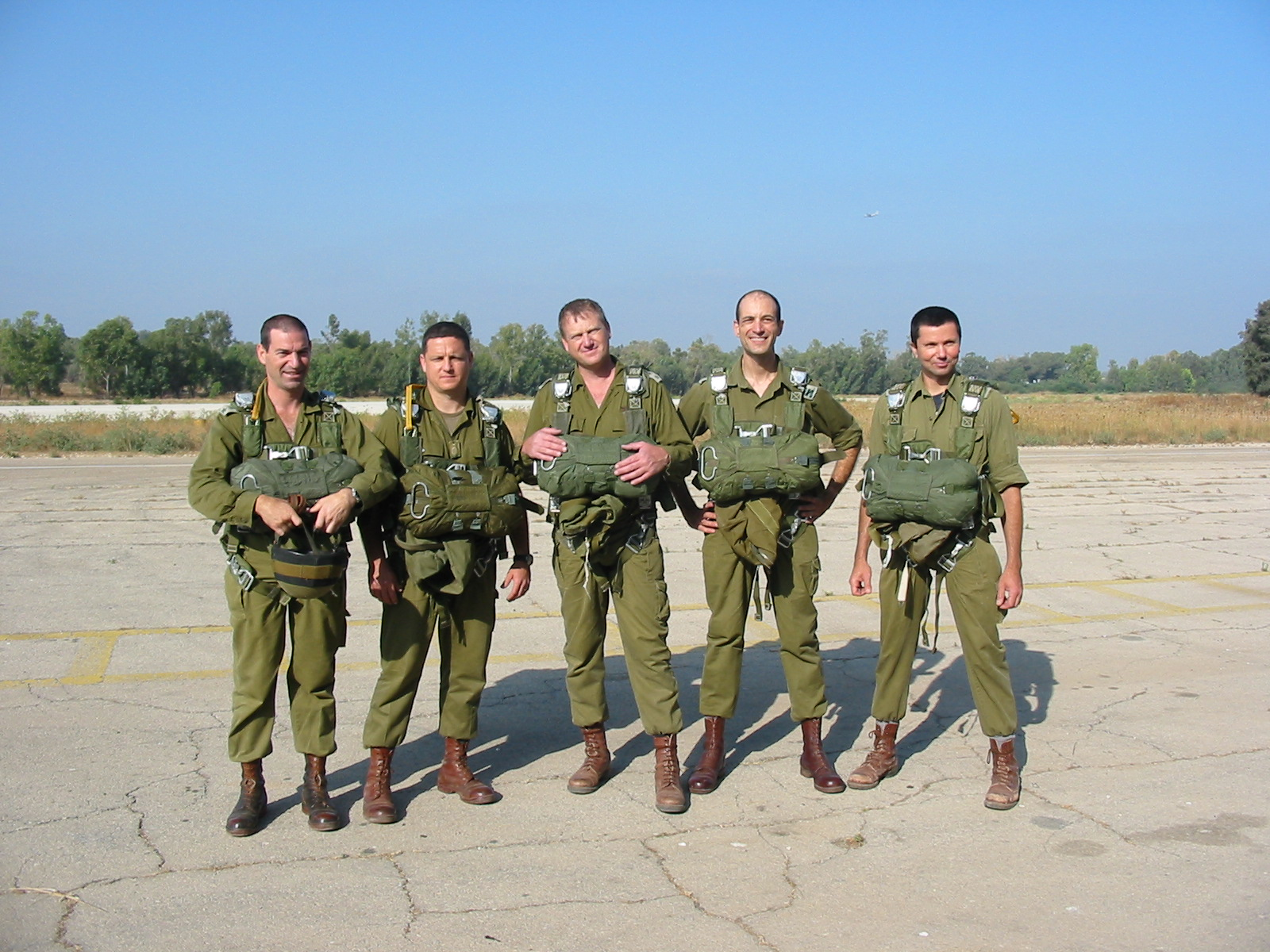
Officers in reserve duty before a parachuting exercise. Reserve service may continue until the age of 51.

Although military service in Israel is compulsory, exemptions can be secured on religious, physical, psychological, or legal grounds. There is also a growing, but still very rare, phenomenon of draft dodging, mainly due to conscience or political reasons. Exemptions have come under attack on grounds of fairness, and also because of a perceived shortage of combat personnel.

Yeshiva students who declare that "Torah study is their occupation" (תורתו אומנותו, Torato Umanuto) can delay their conscription as long as they continue their studies, under the so-called Tal Law. In practice, many Yeshiva students end up never serving at all. Following the Haredi community's high birthrate and massive growth in comparison to the rest of Jewish Israeli society, the system which was initially created to allow for a couple hundred exemptions has now led to, as of 2019, 59% of Jewish women and 69% of Jewish men being drafted. The Tal Law was later ruled unconstitutional in its current form, and a replacement is needed before August 2012. Most previous beneficiaries of this exemption are Haredi Jews. Members of the Religious Zionist sector often serve within a separate system called Hesder, a concept developed by Rabbi Yehuda Amital, which combines advanced Talmudic studies with military service in the Israel Defense Forces. The IDF also tends to make the military service easier for older conscripts and those with families; as well as high-ranked sportspeople and artists (musicians, models, actors, and social media influencers) of note. From time to time a public debate emerges in Israel around the issue of exemption from military service in Israel.

A basic law of Israel is the Israeli Defense Service Law. It lists the guidelines and regulations of mandated military service in Israel. Some regulation includes age, duties, service requirements, time of service, etc. Chapter 5: Reserve Service: Going Abroad covers the rules and requirements for going on becoming a temporary reserve and going abroad.

(a) A person designated for defense service and a person of military age who belongs to the regular forces of the Israel Defense Forces shall not go abroad unless granted a permit from the Minister of Defense. (b) A person of military age the continuance of whose regular service has been deferred for any reason shall not go abroad during the period of deferment save under a permit from the Minister of Defense. (c) A permit under this section may be unconditional or subject to conditions, including a condition relating to the holder's stay abroad. (e) Where any of the conditions of the permit is not fulfilled, the Minister of Defense may revoke the permit and may direct him, by order, to return to Israel within the time prescribed in the order. (f) The Minister of Defense shall not exercise his power under subsection (e) before he has given the holder of the permit an opportunity to state his case to him.

The IDF had strict restraints on letting individuals go into the reserves, even if just temporarily because of their high risk of attack from neighboring states. Through the dissolution of partnerships and peace treaties in recent years, that threat has reduced considerably. Consequently, the high demand for IDF soldiers has slightly decreased as well.

== Specific population groups ==
- The IDF does not conscript Arab citizens of Israel who are Muslim or Christian; however, they may choose to volunteer for military service. Since 1956, enlistment has been mandatory for Druze and Circassian men, after a request by the Druze community to make conscription mandatory.
- Yeshiva students who declare that "Torah study is their profession" (תורתו אומנותו, Torato Umanuto) could previously delay their conscription as long as they continue their studies, under the so-called Tal Law until it was repealed.
- Female draftees who state that they maintain a religious Jewish way of life are exempt from military service, and many of them choose to volunteer for an alternative national service called Sherut Leumi.
- Male members of the Religious Zionist sector often serve within a separate system called Hesder, a concept developed by Rabbi Yehuda Amital, which combines advanced Talmudic studies with military service in the Israel Defense Forces. It is a five year program, which normally entails serving for a year and five months instead of three years and learning for three years and seven months.
- Draftees who state that they are pacifists are required to appear before a committee tasked with examining the credibility of their claim. Exemption from service is granted if the committee is persuaded that their pacifism is sincere and meets the agreed criteria. Only a few individuals each year are granted an exemption on grounds of pacifism; all other self-declared pacifists are required to enlist.
- Immigrants who immigrate to Israel at the age of conscription get various concessions in their military service.
- Draftees with a physical or psychological disability which are exempt from military service may still volunteer to serve. It can be a symbolic service of four hours a day, but they might also end up serving in full-time military service.
- Leading active athletes might in many cases be granted an "Outstanding athlete" status which allows them to get a more convenient and shorter service, so they can continue to develop their career and represent Israel abroad in international competitions. The "Outstanding athlete" status is given only to athletes competing in Olympic sports. In addition, the military also grants the similar "Outstanding dancer" status and an "Outstanding musician" status. This status is granted in the same way and after the individuals have been examined. They may also be granted a more convenient service so that they can continue to improve their abilities and career during military service.

== Draft process ==
The military draft process occurs in the following steps:

The Army calls upon a potential soldier in a letter and this is called the "First Calling" or Tzav Rishon. This letter states that the teenager must report to a certain place at a certain time for a day-long examination and interviewing. After careful looking over of the Tzav Rishon's results the army will call the people to enlist when they turn a certain age to begin the army process and basic training.

== Deferral of service ==
There are various routes which allow the draftees to postpone the date of conscription. An automatic postponement is granted for students to graduate from high school. Additional routes which lead to the postponing of conscription include:

- Volunteering for a one-year service in a youth organization.
- Postponement of conscription due to the IDF needs, usually due to a course beginning on a date which occurs later than the original drafting date given to the draftee.
- Postponement of conscription due to various personal reasons.
- One can postpone the draft for a year in order to go to Torah studies.
- One can postpone the draft as part of the Hesder agreement.

== Academic programs ==
- Academic Reserve – a program designed to enlist and train soldiers who have an academic background in fields vital to the military's needs.
- Talpiot program – an elite training program for young people who have demonstrated outstanding academic ability in the sciences, physics and mathematics. Graduates of the Talpiot program pursue higher education while serving in the army, and then utilize their expertise to further IDF research and development.
- The pilot course also offers a Tal college degree.
- The Israeli Naval Academy (קורס חובלים), whose candidates study for a degree from the Haifa University during the course.

== Volunteering equivalency ==
A draftee found unfit for military service may still choose to volunteer for military service; their status will be similar to all the other draftees found to be fit for service. Once enlisted, these volunteers cannot choose to quit the military early.

== Alternative national service ==
There is an alternative voluntary civilian national service in Israel for those that cannot or do not wish to serve in the Israel Defense Forces. Most participants are Jewish women from the Religious Zionist sector.

== See also ==
- Israel Defense Forces
- The People's Army Model
- Refusal to serve in the IDF
- Reserve duty (Israel)
- Women in the Israel Defense Forces
- David Leibel
