= Military exemption =

Legal exemption from military service

A military exemption is an official legal provision that exempts individuals or groups of people from compulsory military service or from certain military duties. Depending on the country and its laws, military exemptions may be granted for various reasons, such as medical reasons, religious beliefs, conscientious objection, family responsibilities, or educational pursuits.

== Algeria ==
Under the Algerian National Service Law, citizens with serious physical or mental disabilities may be examined by a military medical board and can be exempted from military service either temporarily or permanently, depending on the condition. Individuals may also receive an exemption if they are the primary supporter of a large family, a parent, or a disabled relative.

Under certain dual-nationality agreements, dual citizens from countries such as France are exempt from Algerian military service. The president has the authority to grant exemptions to specific groups of people through official decrees. Citizens can also receive exemptions if they are preparing to run for or hold a government office. In addition, some individuals whose ancestors fought in the Algerian War of Independence may qualify for exemption. Finally, Algerian citizens living abroad may apply for military service exemptions through Algerian consulates.

== Angola ==
Under Angola's Military Service Law (Lei do Serviço Militar), a person may be exempt from military service if they have a serious physical or mental disability that makes them unfit to serve. Exemptions may also be granted to certain essential workers, such as full-time teachers, because the government considers their work important to the functioning of society. Individuals who refuse military service for moral or religious reasons may also be exempted and instead required to perform community or alternative civilian service. In addition, exemptions or deferments can be granted to people who are the sole provider for their family or orphans responsible for caring for younger siblings.

== Armenia ==
Armenian law provides several exemptions from compulsory military service. Individuals declared medically unfit by a military commission are exempt, and health-related exemptions account for a large share of cases. Exemptions may also apply in certain family circumstances, including when a person is the only son in a family that has lost a member during military service. Persons who have completed military service in another country, generally for a minimum required period prior to obtaining Armenian citizenship, may also qualify for exemption.

In addition, exemptions may be granted by decision of the government in specific cases. Armenian law also provides for alternative civilian service for conscientious objectors, allowing individuals to fulfill their obligation outside the armed forces.

Separate provisions apply to individuals who have not served by the age of eligibility. Men aged 27–37 who avoided conscription may regularize their status by completing reduced service or paying a legally prescribed fee in exchange for exemption.

== Austria ==
Under Austrian law, male citizens are generally subject to compulsory military service (Wehrpflicht) from the age of 18. Exemptions may be granted for medical unfitness, ongoing education, or significant family or economic responsibilities. Male citizens who object to armed service for reasons of conscience may perform alternative civilian service (Zivildienst), which lasts longer than standard military service. Austrian citizens living abroad or those who have completed equivalent mandatory service in another country may also qualify for exemption. Female citizens are not subject to conscription but may volunteer for military service.

== Azerbaijan ==
In Azerbaijan, certain individuals may be permanently exempt from mandatory military service in the Azerbaijani Armed Forces. While all able-bodied male citizens are generally subject to conscription at age 18, exemptions can be granted under specific conditions. Permanent deferment applies to individuals who hold a doctoral degree (PhD), people with serious health conditions including mental illness, citizens who have been arrested for committing a grave crime, and individuals registered with law enforcement under preventive or operational supervision. Women are not required to serve unless they choose to volunteer. The standard service period for those who do serve is 18 months, or 12 months for university graduates.

== Belarus ==
Under the Law of the Republic of Belarus “On Military Duty and Military Service,” men are required to complete compulsory military service. The length of service is 18 months for those without higher education and 12 months for those who have obtained a higher education degree. It is generally difficult to be declared unfit for service in Belarus; however, exemptions or deferments may be granted in certain cases, including those employed in critical civilian occupations, and members of specific religions (such as Jehovah's Witnesses) who qualify as conscientious objectors.

== Bolivia ==
In Bolivia, military service is legally mandatory for male citizens beginning at age 18; however, exemptions and non-service are permitted under a range of conditions within the system of the Bolivian Armed Forces. Individuals may be exempted on medical grounds, including physical or mental health conditions that render them unfit for service. Deferments are commonly granted to those enrolled in secondary or higher education, which may delay or effectively prevent conscription. Additional exemptions may apply to individuals who are the sole economic providers for their families.

== Brazil ==
Military service in Brazil is compulsory for all male citizens, who are subject to conscription from the first day of the year in which they turn 18 until the end of the year in which they turn 45. In the case of war, the period may be extended according to the needs of the government. Those who are not selected during the annual process are issued a Certificate of Exemption from Enlistment, or Certificado de Dispensa de Incorporação (CDI), a certificate of exemption from military enlistment that confirms the individual's military obligations, even when not in the armed forces. The document is used as evidence for compliance with military obligations and may be required for certain procedures including public examinations, passport distribution, and enrollment in educational institutions.

Permitted rationales for exemption include both mental and physical disabilities, being the sole provider for other individuals, being an only child, or being a member of the clergy.

== Croatia ==
Under Croatian law, all male citizens aged between 18 and 27 must complete a 2 month long compulsory military service. Permanent exemptions may be granted to those with a criminal history or severe disabilities. Police cadets, judicial police officers, members of the clergy and those who have completed similar training in another country are also exempt. Deferrals may be granted to those enrolled in higher education institutions, certain professional athletes, Croatians living abroad, sole earners and those undergoing work training. Deferrals can also be granted for major life events such as a close family member's death, marriage childbirth or starting a business. Female citizens are not subject to conscription but may volunteer for military service.

== Cuba ==
Under Cuban law, male citizens are generally subject to 2 years of compulsory military service.These 2 years can be completed at any time as long as they are completed in one continuous period between the ages of 17 and 28. Permanent exemptions may be granted for medical unfitness, due to a severe physical or mental disability. Individuals can also defer if they have a temporary injury or illness, are completing their studies or are the sole supporter of 2 or more dependents under the age of 21. According to the report of the UN Committee on the Rights of the Child, "adolescents have the option of working out their term of military service by performing duties of other kinds, which may be economic or social in character". Female citizens are not subject to conscription but may volunteer for military service.

== Eritrea ==
Under Eritrean law, all Eritrean citizens aged 18–50 must complete 18 months of compulsory military service. Exemptions on the base of conscientious objection are not accepted. Conscripts have no choice in the type of the work they are conscripted to do. The state may also indefinitely increase conscription, with conscripts often spending years or decades in the military. Several human rights watchdog organizations, have also documented cases of children as young 15 being conscripted. Permanent exemptions are provided only in cases of a severe disability preventing the individual from participating in the military service. Examples include but are not limited to blindness or major development delays.

== Greece ==
Conscription in Greece is codified is enshrined in Article 4(6) of the Constitution, which states that "every Greek capable of bearing arms is obliged to contribute to the defense of the Fatherland as provided by law." The law on conscription is Law 3421/2005; under it, all Greek males are obliged to serve in the Armed Forces for 9 to 12 months from the beginning of their 19th year to the end of their 45th year.

Permitted rationales for exemption include being a father of more than three children or children who cannot support themselves, or a widower. Postponements are allowed to students in higher education, on rationales of health, or to those with brothers serving in the Armed Forces.

== Germany ==
Since 2011, Germany no longer mandates military service for men, transitioning to an all-volunteer army. However, the constitutional clause permitting the establishment of mandatory military service for men remained in effect. Since 2026, men and women will receive a form to assess their fitness to serve once they turn 18, which men are obligated to fill out. Starting in July 2026, young men born later than 2007 may be called to a military center for assessment, if capacity is available. In addition, new measures have been implemented to make military service more appealing. The new law also allows the Bundestag to create a chance-based system for mandatory service, if the number of volunteers is not sufficient.

Art. 4 III of the Grundgesetz allows any person to become a conscientious objector. The objector must explain his reasons in detail; broad statements lacking depth or specificity are not generally sufficient. In case of war or a significant tension, those refusing to serve in the armed forces may be obligated to complete civil service instead (§ 1 II KDVG).

== Iran ==
All male Iranian citizens are obligated to serve between 18 and 24 months.

Service exceptions exist for reasons of physical and mental health. LGBTQ individuals are excluded from service due to "moral and sexual deviancy", and may be forced to undergo humiliating treatment. In addition, gay men may be pressured to present as trans women.

A reduction in service time or a delay of service is offered to university students. Exceptions may also be granted due to family situations, membership in the Basij, or other academic/work reasons in exceptional circumstances.

As of 2014, no protocol exists for a conscientious objection, despite some minorities in Iran holding pacifist beliefs. Refusal to serve may lead to being denied for government employment and driver's licenses. Passports and permits to leave the country are regularly denied to those who refuse to serve. There are no provisions for alternative service.

== Israel ==
Israel's Security Service Law requires military service mainly for Jewish, Druze, and Circassian citizens (Jewish men and women, but only men from the other two groups). People can receive exemptions for reasons such as medical or psychological issues, living abroad, criminal records, or religious and family reasons, especially for women. Arab citizens of Israel are generally not conscripted but may volunteer. For many years, ultra-Orthodox (Haredi) Jewish men studying in religious schools were exempt, but in 2024 the Supreme Court of Israel ruled that they could be drafted, leading the military to begin conscripting them. Military service is an important part of Israeli society, and avoiding service is often criticized.

== Jordan ==
Under a new Jordanian law, passed in 2025, a number of male citizens will be subject to compulsory military service. They will be selected, from a pool of those who are 18 by the 1 of January of the corresponding year.This will be done in 3 equal waves, using a statistical draw based on personal data.In 2026, an inaugural cohort of 6000 conscripts has been selected, with 300 from each region with the exceptions of Amman, Zarqa and Irbid, which had 1,500, 900 and 900 conscripts selected respectively.The number of total annual conscriptions is set to grow to 10,000 in the coming years with each region increasing proportionally. The first 2–3 months, of the year long military services are composed of military training and the remaining 9 entail a placement in a specific speciality in the private sector. Permanent exemptions may be granted to those medical unfit to serve in the military or sole sons in a family.Individuals can also defer if they are studying at an educational institution or live abroad, the sole supporter of 2 or more dependents under the age of 21. Up to 12 university credit hours may count towards the time on one's military service hours. Female citizens are not subject to conscription but may volunteer for military service.

== Latvia ==
Under Latvia law, some male citizens aged between 18 and 27, selected by random draw must complete a 11 months long compulsory military service, if there are not enough volunteers. Permanent exemptions are granted for those who are considered physically unfit, sole caretakers of children or other dependents, people who had completed a similar service in another country, certain government employees, graduates of a military school and people convicted of serious crime. Consciencous conjecture may participate in an 11-month alternative civilian service they spend their time working in a Latvian defense sector institution. Female citizens are not subject to conscription but may volunteer for military service.

== North Korea ==
North Korea's law requires most civilians to serve in the military unless they have severe physical disabilities that make them unfit for service. In some cases, exemptions or deferments may also be granted to individuals with close connections to the ruling elite, students attending prestigious institutions such as Kim Il-sung University, or personnel working in essential technological, industrial, or scientific field.

== Norway ==
Conscription in Norway is constitutionally established and further regulated by the Act on Military Service. Conscientious objection has been legally recognized since 1922, with the 1965 Law on Exemption of Military Service for Reasons of Personal Conviction being, under which religious and non-religious grounds are recognized, being the present legal basis. Article 1 of the 1965 law states that "If there is any reason to suppose that a conscript is unable to perform military service of any kind without coming into conflict with his serious conviction, he shall be exempted from such service by the competent Ministry or by judgement pronounced pursuant to the provisions of this Act". Opposition to the use of nuclear weapons has also been included as grounds since a 1990 amendment to the law. Chapter 4 of the Act on Military Service focuses on the rights and responsibilities of conscientious objectors, stipulates that a conscript shall be exempted from military service if there is reason to believe that serving would be in violation of their religious or fundamental beliefs.

== Poland ==
Military exemption (Polish: Egzempcja wojskowa) was the soldier's legal immunity in Polish–Lithuanian Commonwealth of 16th–17th century.

Military exemptions allow to evaluate the legal position of mercenary soldiers, functioning of legal norms of a temporary character and the interrelations between the statutory law and customary law in Poland.

In 16th and 17th centuries both the general exemptions, granted by Sejm (parliament), and hetman’s exemptions, deprived of the Sejm’s sanction, existed. The constitutions on the exemptions always had a temporary nature. As a consequence of the advancing paralysis of the parliament’s works, the exemptions issued by hetman became more and more common.

Exemptions were the releases to be applied before all types of courts, apart from military courts. They withheld the proceedings (even enforcement proceedings when the verdict did not benefit from the res iudicata character) with regard to all persons taking part in the military expeditions and their families. This enhanced the attractiveness of military service and prevented soldiers from leaving the army.

Exemptions were known to the customary law, however, they were formulated by Sejm by means of constitutions. The parliament, depending on the circumstances, enlarged or limited the group of the beneficiaries, applied more or less strict criteria, changed the time limits of the exemptions’ validity, prevented their abuse, and most importantly, it firmly opposed a rejection of the releases by courts.

== Russia ==
Students in higher education can receive a deferment for the duration of their studies. Civilian service is available as an alternative, if the prospective conscript declares their preference 6 months before the beginning of the service. Their preference may be considered, but isn't binding; some areas of service include occupied Ukrainian territory. In some cases, even those applying for alternative service may be prosecuted for draft evasion.

== Serbia ==
A recent Serbian law reintroduced a 75-day compulsory military service for all male Serbian citizens age 18–27. Permanent exemptions may be granted to those medically unfit to serve in the military and those living abroad. Deferrals are automatically granted to double citizens until age 26. Conscientous objectivers may complete a 150 day long alternative civilian service. Female citizens are not subject to conscription but may volunteer for military service.

== Singapore ==
All Singaporean males between the ages of 16 and a half and 50 are eligible for military service, with a 2-year enlistment possible any time after one's 18th birthday. Singapore allows for exemptions to military service only with approval from the military authorities. There are no official guidelines in place for what can lead to an exemption, but in practice, it is used for medical reasons, to avoid enlisting people with a criminal record, and when the enlistment would cause hardship on enlistee's family.

== Sweden ==
Both men and women can be called to service. Sweden allows for applications of the so-called "weapons-free status", which replaces military with civil service. Applications are possible even after completing military training, are generally accepted, and number roughly 100 per year in 2022 and 2023, with an increase in 2024, followed by a reduction in 2025. The civil service includes areas such as electricity and emergency services. Military exemptions are also possible for health reasons even during training.

== Switzerland ==
Switzerland obligates men to serve in the military. Service includes an obligation to report to local civil and military authorities, appearing for muster and service, and a punishment if one refuses. Men with severe disabilities or service-related injuries do not have to serve.

There is an alternative civil service available for those who cannot serve for reasons of conscience. Those refusing both options to serve must pay an additional tax, which may be refunded if the service is later completed. Men with dual citizenship who have served in other militaries (and some other dual citizens), those who recently gained or lost their citizenship, and citizens residing in another country are exempt.

== Taiwan ==
Under Taiwanese law, all male eligible male citizens must complete at least 1 year of compulsory military service, usually starting around the age of 19. Permanent exemptions may be granted to those medical unfit to serve in the military. A few possible reasons to be certified as medically unfit include are a severe physical or mental disability, certain chronic conditions and a BMI of over 35. Those sentenced to over 5 years in prison or those who have served at least 3 years in prison, are also ineligible.Those who pass these criteria are participate in a random draw.The branch to which an individual is conscripted to is selected using the random draw.Deferrals may be provided to allow individuals to complete their studies. Additionally, those who cannot the complete the military service due to familial, religious, financial, educational or other factors, may choose to complete an equivalent substitute service.Those ineligible for conscription due to health reasons may also often complete the substitute services. This substitute services is often composed of civilian social duties based, the nature of which is based on the skillset of the participant. Taiwanese citizens living abroad must enter the draft if they ever return to Taiwan for 6 or more consecutive months. They may defer for 6 months due to exigent circumstances such as being denied entry to their country of residence or conflict there.This process may be repeated. Female citizens are not subject to conscription but may volunteer for military service.

== Turkey ==
Under Turkish law, all male eligible male citizens must complete at least 1 year of compulsory military service, usually starting around the age of 18. Permanent exemptions may be granted to those medical unfit to serve in the military, however they will be subject to regular medical check-ups for 2 years to verify their ineligibility. Permanent exemptions may also be granted to gay, bisexual or transgender men as long as “prove” their status. Furthermore, according to local sources, a conscript can receive a permanent exemption if his brother has died during military service. Turkish citizens living abroad may defer indefinitely but are required to pay a fee upon return to Turkey. People enrolled in higher education institutions may also defer until the end of their education. Finally, there also exists a buy out scheme that allows those who have completed the 1 months of military training may pay a fee of 31,000 Turkish Lira to avoid the rest. Female citizens are not subject to conscription but may volunteer for military service.

== Turkministan ==
Under Turkmen law, all male eligible male citizens must complete 24 months of compulsory military service, between the ages of 18 and 27. Deferrals may be provided to individuals attending a higher education institution, however even when they are granted they may be overridden by the government at any time. Exemptions on the base of conscientious objection are not accepted. According to a report by Radio Free Europe, many families pay bribes of around $5,700 to obtain deferrals for their children. Female citizens are not subject to conscription but may volunteer for military service.

== United Arab Emirates ==
Under Emirati law, all male citizens aged between 18 and 30 must complete an 11 month long compulsory military service. Permanent exemptions may be granted to those medically unfit to serve in the military and only children. Deferrals may be granted to those who are financially supporting a parent, a sibling or a family member with a severe disability. Additionally, those sentenced to time in prison or those who are with a temporary illness or injury, are exempt until the above condition resolves. Female citizens are not subject to conscription but may volunteer for military service.

== United States of America ==
Under US law, generally, able-bodied men between the ages of 17 and 45 who are US citizens or who have made a declaration to become a citizen may be conscripted for military service. Those who are continually confined to an institution due to disability, incarcerated, active duty military members, or students in military officer procurement programs, service academies, or Coast Guard academy are not required to register for the Selective Service System, which is the body that collates eligible men. Conscientious objectors, ministers, students preparing for ministry, elected officials, and members of some other professions are required to register for the draft, but will be differed from service if they would otherwise be required to serve. Any man who would otherwise be required to serve but had a mother, father, brother, or sister killed or missing while serving is exempt.

== See also ==
- Exemption from military service in Israel
- Szlachta
