= Israeli Defense Service Law =

Israeli law that regulates military conscription

Israel Defense Service Law 5746–1986

Knesset
- Enacted by: Knesset
- Signed: 30 January 1986
- Status: Current legislation

The Israel Security Service Law (Hebrew: חוק שירות ביטחון), also known as the Israel Defense Service Law, regulates conscription into military service for citizens and residents of Israel. Enacted in 1986, it replaced the Security Service Act of 1949 and the Security Service Law of 1959, which made conscription a national routine rather than only requiring military draft during national security emergencies.

== History ==
=== Background ===
Following the devastation of Europe's Jewish population during the Nazi Holocaust and coupled with the rise in Zionism since the 19th century, the United Nations General Assembly recommended the establishment of a Jewish state in the Middle Eastern province of Palestine. Following the declaration of its independence on 14 May 1948, the Arab nations of Egypt, Syria, Jordan, and Iraq began to invade Palestine in an attempt to eradicate the newly formed state of Israel. On 26 May 1948, the Israeli Defense Force, or IDF, was established as Israel's official military. Formed out of the pre-1948 Jewish paramilitary organizations Haganah, Irgun and Lehi, the IDF was a conscription military divided into the army, navy, and air force branches. Immediately, the IDF drafted thousands of men into service to combat the invading Arab forces. The Security Service Act and later Security Service Law was passed in 1949 to regulate the recruitment into IDF service. The law has since gone through several revisions and alterations, most notably in 1959 and 1986.

=== Haredi conscription ===
Due to the increasing Haredi population in Israel, their continued exemption from service became a subject of debate in the country. In 1999, the Tal Committee was formed to discuss legislation aimed at integrating these communities into military or national service. The Tal Law passed in 2002 which aimed to enlist about 80% of eligible Haredim, with the law subject to 5-year renewals based on performance. The law was renewed once in 2007 but not renewed for a second in 2012 because the Supreme Court of Israel found it inadequate in addressing enlistment.

On 12 March 2014, the Knesset passed amendment 19 which ended conscription exemptions for Haredi Israelis by introducing enlistment targets over several years to reach about 60% by 2017.

== Provisions ==
=== Qualification ===
The Security Service Law requires that all citizens of Israel, except those who qualify for the exemptions from service, to service in the various branches of the IDF. Section 2 defines the age appropriate for conscription, and set it at 18–29 years of age for men, and 18–26 for women, based on the Hebrew calendar. However, recruitment may begin at age 17 if the parents or guardians of the recruit allow it.

=== Pre-service screening ===
Section 3 through 12 gives the Israeli Secretary of Defense the authority to call citizens to medical screenings to determine if conscription is permissible.

=== Duration of service ===
Before 2015, under article 15, service for men is set at 36 months, and recruits over the age of 27 serve for 24 months, while new immigrants who are older than 27 serve 18 months. In 2015, male service was shortened to 32 months with plans to shorten again to 30 months. This move was delayed until June 2029 due to the military needs amidst the Middle Eastern crisis.

Under section 16a, service for women is set at 24 months, with optional volunteering for an additional 12 months.

Any soldier tried and found guilty by a military court or deserters who are returned to service are to have their service time extended to meet the requirements of regular service duty under Article 18.

=== Non-military positions ===
The Security Service Law extends to cover conscription into the Israeli Border Police, or Magav, under Article 24.

Since 1995, section 24A regulated the transfer of soldiers into the Israeli Police Service, or Shaham.

In 2005, Section 24 regulated the use of IDF troops as Israeli prison guards.

=== Exemptions from service ===
Power is given to the Israeli Defense Minister to exempt citizens from service under Section 36.

Section 36A states that for regular service in the IDF, the age of the soldier shall not exceed 54 for men and 38 for women.

Section 39 exempts pregnant women and current mothers from service, also married women are exempt from regular service but not reserve service.

Article 40 provides the layout for what the military allows for religious exemption from service. However, this is the only exemption that may be enacted and revoked at any time by the Israeli Ministry of Defense.

Male Druzes are eligible for conscription into the IDF under the Israeli Security Service Law; however, a growing controversy is the exclusion of recruiting Muslim Israeli Arabs into service. This exemption originated in 1949 and was again continued after review in 1954 and has yet to be revoked.

=== Punishments ===
If a person attempts to dodge the draft by providing the state of Israel with false information, false medical recorders, mutilates their body or has someone else mutilate their body to avoid conscription, they may be charged and given 5 years in prison as punishment under Article 46A.

== See also ==
- Conscription in Israel
- Refusal to serve in the IDF
- IDF
- Tal Law
- Exemption from military service in Israel
