= Chief Reserve Officer (Israel) =

Commander of the Israel Defense Forces military reserve force

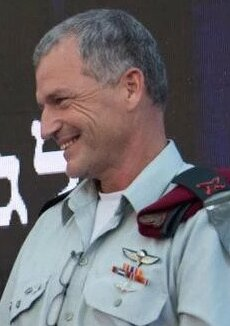
Benny Ben Ari

The Israeli Commander of Reserve Forces Corps (Hebrew: קצין מילואים ראשי) is the commander of the Israel Defense Forces military reserve force. As of 2021, the Commander of Reserve Forces Corps is Brigadier-General Benny Ben Ari.

The position was created both as part of the 21st Century IDF reforms as well as largely due to feelings of discrimination by reservists following Operation Defensive Shield, whereby the reservists complained that employers preferred those who serve shorter durations over those serving lengthier terms. Until the position was created, the reserve force fell under the jurisdiction of the respective branch and there was no one, single officer to represent IDF reservists. Also, as part of the reserve force reform, a celebratory "Reserve Day" was established during which reservists are entitled to several benefits. Leaders of the reservists groups, however, maintained this falls short and that better employment protections and more substantive benefits are needed. During the Second Lebanon War, severe war-time shortages and other critical oversights affecting the reserve force culminated in the reserve soldiers' protest, which became an important political event in Israel, leading to the creation of the Winograd Commission.

== Goals ==
- To oversee the advancement and development of the reserve system; to aid in its operations and its intake of manpower
- To aid in the maintenance of the reserve system's operational competence and its coherency, according to the new reserve system design
- To improve the motivation of the reservists in continuing their service according to the new reserve system design
- To increase the positive results and joint cooperation in the reserve system according to the new reserve system design
- To be the center of development and integration in all matters regarding the reserve system, as a facility to promote decisions regarding the reserves
- To be the primary facility promoting connection between the reserves in the military and in society
