= Exemption from military service in Israel =

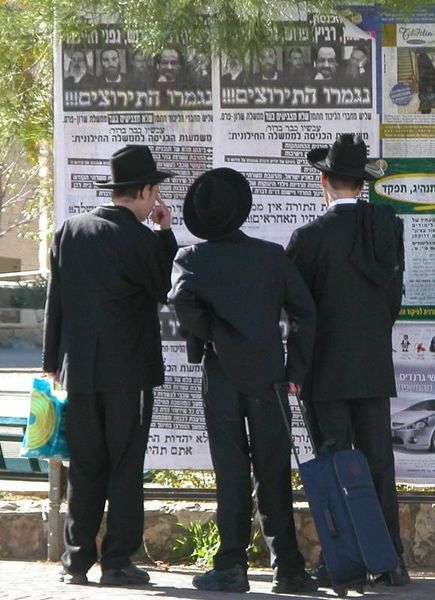
Male Haredi Jews who declared that Torah study is their profession were exempt from compulsory military service or served for a considerably shorter period until the law was changed in 2014. Legislation on this has since changed in a way that has been contested by the High Court.

Per Israeli Security Service Law, which regulates the process of Israeli military conscription, an Israeli citizen who is drafted into the Israel Defense Forces (IDF) may be exempted if an evaluation finds them to meet specific criteria. The IDF's conscription laws only apply to three communities: the Jews, the Druze, and the Circassians. Both men and women are drafted from the Jewish community, whereas only men are drafted from the Druze and Circassian communities.

Grounds for exemptions are expatriate status, medical or psychological issues, conscientious objection, and criminal record (subject to review). Additionally, female Jewish draftees can be exempt due to marriage, pregnancy, motherhood, or religious commitments, including observing dietary and Sabbath travel laws, in accordance with §39 and §40 of the Security Service Law.

For Haredi Jews, their conscription into military service were previously shortened or exempted based on the religious principle of Torato Umanuto, where military service was avoided as long as they remained enrolled at their yeshiva for religious studies. In June 2024, Israel's Supreme Court unanimously ruled that Haredi Jews were eligible for compulsory service, ending nearly eight decades of exemption. The army began drafting Haredi men the following month.

Additionally, Arab citizens of Israel (who constitute about 21% of the Israeli population) are also exempted from military service. This exemption does not originate via Israeli statutory law, but is instead based on the guidelines of the IDF Human Resource Department, issued under the IDF's discretionary powers pursuant to the law. As a result, Arab Muslims, Arab Christians, and Bedouins are not conscripted, though all of them may still serve voluntarily. Among Israel's non-Druze and non-Circassian minorities, the Bedouin community has been notable for their voluntary contributions to service in the IDF.

== Statistics ==
According to 2007 IDF figures, the largest single group of young (Jewish) Israelis who avoided conscription consisted of women who claim exemptions on religious grounds. This group made up 35% of all women eligible for the draft. Amongst males, the overall percentage of non-participation was 27.7%. This figure included 11.2% citing Torato Umanuto, 7.3% citing medical and psychological reasons, 4.7% because of criminal records and 4.2% because of residing abroad. In 2014, the law changed such that the majority of the Haredi Jews were no longer exempt from the military service. Another law change to grant exemptions again was contested by the High Court in 2017. This ban on exemptions has now theoretically come into force but a lack of government action means nothing has changed in practice.

By 2020, about 32.9% of men and 44.3% of women received exemptions from IDF service, and an additional 15% of men dropped out before completing their term of service. Of those who received exemptions, some 44.7% were Haredim, 46.6% were secular, and 8.7% were religious Zionist. There was a noted increase in exemptions granted for reasons of mental health.

== Non-recruitment ==
Accordance with section 36 of the Security Service Law, the security minister may exempt certain people from an army service in the IDF, for reasons related to the volume of the military forces or reserve forces, or for reasons related to educational needs, settlement needs, security needs, economy needs, family needs and various other reasons.

In accordance with section 5 of the Security Service Law, a medical board is authorized to determine if a candidate is unfit for national security service.

Gila Golan was not conscripted due to her not knowing her age.

== Draft evasion ==
In 2005, 32.1% of the Jewish women did not enlist in the military on religious grounds, and the overall rate of non-enlisted Jewish women has risen to 42.3%. These high rates indicate that refraining from the draft is relatively common, at least among Israeli women. In 2008, the proportion of women who did not enlist rose to 44%, from which 34.6% did not enlist on religious grounds. As a result, the Israeli military tightened the way it handles cases in which Jewish women request an exemption on religious grounds, through investigating the truthfulness of their claims, in order to expose young women who lied about being religious.

- Marrying with the sole purpose of receiving the exemption granted to all married women, without any intention of the actual realization of the marriage (usually the woman would seek to divorce after being granted the desired exemption).
- Displaying false medical certificates or pretending to be ill, in order to obtain an exemption based on health reasons.
- A woman would ask to be exempted for religious reasons, while in real life she is not religious.
- Leaving Israel before a person gets to the age of recruitment, and not returning to the country despite the attempts of the recruiting office to contact the individual. A common method which the state uses to fight this trend is to avoid extending the validity of a person's passport when it expires.

Section 94 of the Security Service Law describes another method of draft evasion: defecting from the military on the day of recruitment. When a soldier fails to show up to be recruited he is defined by the military as a draft evader. After being defined as a draft evader, an arrest warrant is issued against him and thereafter the military police is responsible for locating and capturing him. After being caught by the military police, it would be decided whether the draft evader would go through disciplinary proceedings (which means that they would get a limited punishment and not a criminal record), or whether he or she would face a military court where the punishment is not limited and the criminal conviction is registered.

=== Mental health exemptions ===
The IDF is permitted to exempt Israeli Jews from conscription if they have mental health issues. It has been reported that this exemption was "notoriously easy to obtain" compared to applying for conscientious objector status, allowing the IDF to accommodate draft evaders while maintaining plausible deniability for all involved. In response to this trend, in 2022 the IDF tightened its criteria for mental health-based draft exemptions.

== Public censure ==
Draft evasion is a criminal act and condemned by the majority of Israelis. Among the strongest opponents to the Israeli government policy, a few people support draft evasion, but they are a minority in the Israeli public. After the 2006 Lebanon War media campaigns were organized against draft evasion and to promote enlistment, especially in combat units. Head of Human Resources Elazar Stern and Defense Minister Ehud Barak were particularly vocal on this subject:

The army is increasingly transforming from the people's army to the army of half of the people. A soldier should not feel that he is going into a battle while being perceived by large parts of the Israeli public as a patsy.

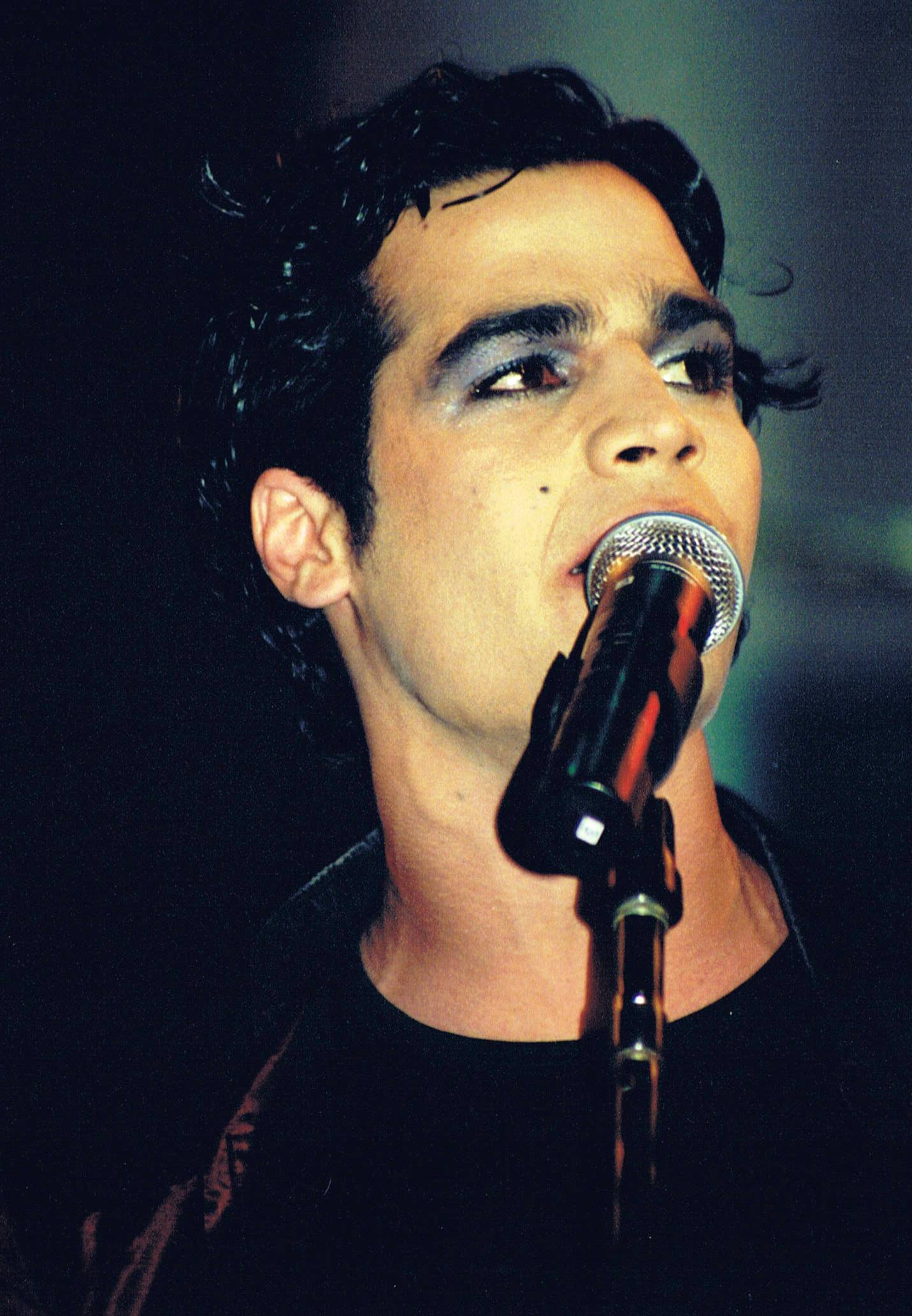
In 1992, Israeli rock singer Aviv Geffen stated that he did not serve in the IDF and encouraged people not to enlist.

Israeli celebrities and public figures who evaded the draft in their youth (mostly before they became famous) have been condemned.

- Knesset Speaker Dalia Itzik: After graduating from a religious high school, "Evelina de Rothschild," Itzik declared she was religious and was granted an exemption from military service.
- In 1992, Israeli rock singer Aviv Geffen stated that he did not serve in the IDF and encouraged people not to enlist. Later, Geffen claimed that the army exempted him from service for medical reasons.
- Israeli model Bar Refaeli, who married a few days before her recruitment day, received an exemption from the military and divorced soon thereafter. In an interview with Yedioth Ahronoth published in October 2007, Refaeli stated: "I'm not against the army and I really wanted to serve, but I do not regret that I did not enlist, because this decision has paid off big time" and added, "What does it matter, Uganda or Israel? For me, it does not matter. Why is it good to die for our country? Isn't it better to live in New York? For what reason do children aged 18 need to sacrifice their lives? It makes no sense that people should die so that I can live in Israel."
- During the 2000s, Israeli singer Jacko Eisenberg stated that the IDF exempted him from service and he did not regret it.
- Israeli singer Maya Buskila was exempted from a military service on grounds of her being religious. Later, Buskila expressed regret for not serving, explaining that she did not know at the time that she would become a role model for young girls. Eventually Buskila decided to enlist in the military, and on 13 April 2008, at the age of 30, she was drafted for a relative short compulsory service in the IDF.

== Impact on civilian life ==
An individual's military service is usually a topic of discussion in many job interviews in Israel, and is information job seekers usually would add to their resume. Nevertheless, in 2003 the Regional Court in Tel Aviv declared that the requirement of military service as a precondition to be hired for a position constitutes discrimination and is forbidden if military service is not relevant for that position. The Israeli Equal Opportunities Act (חוק שוויון ההזדמנויות בעבודה) was revised in the mid 1990s to prohibit employers from asking candidates about their military profile in the IDF. Nevertheless, legally there is as yet no prohibition against questions regarding an individual's military service or the fact that they did not enlist in the military - information which might be used later on as part of the many considerations which would contribute to an interviewer's decision not to hire the individual. In the years since the Equal Opportunities Act was revised, and despite the changes in the Israeli public regarding military service, there is still largely a negative attitude toward those who have not served in the IDF. As an example, a substantial proportion of the employment ads in the newspapers state explicitly that only candidates who have carried out "full military service" will be considered for that position.

== See also ==
- New Profile
- Profile 21
- Refusal to serve in the Israeli military
- Women in the Israel Defense Forces
