= Unit 9900 =

Israeli military intelligence

- יחידה 9900
- Active: 1997 - Present
- Country: Israel
- Branch: Military Intelligence Directorate (Israel)
- Role: Geospatial intelligence
- Engagements: Operation Breaking Dawn; Gaza War; Hezbollah–Israel conflict (2023–present); Twelve-Day War
- Decorations: Israel Defense Prize (2022)

Commanders
- Current commander: Brigadier General S.
- (2019-2023): Brigadier General Erez Eskal

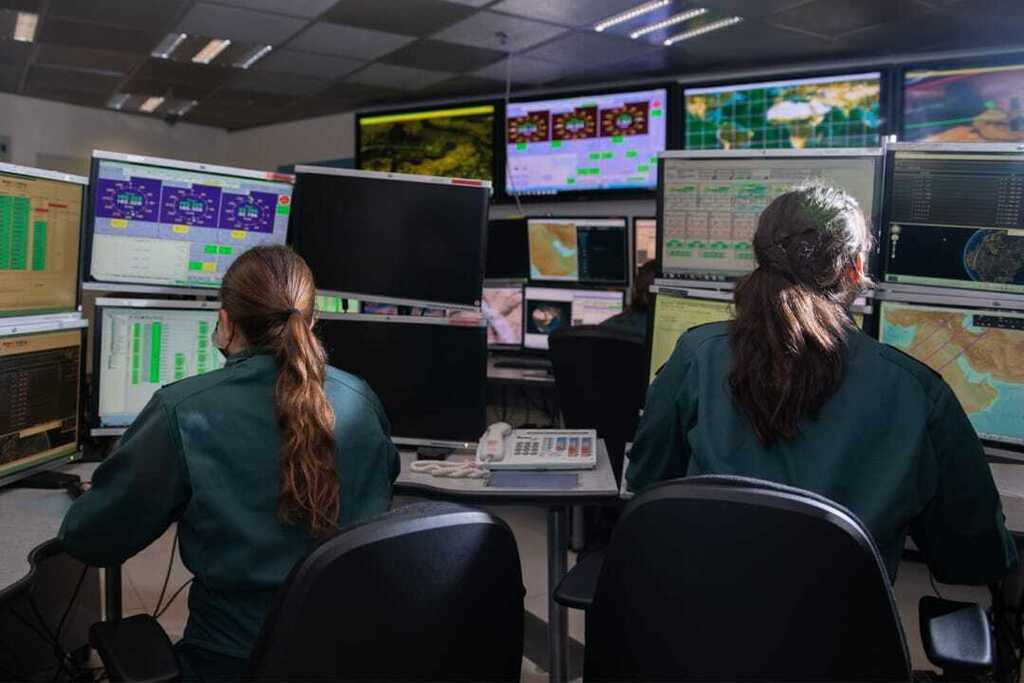
Satellite operators in Unit 9900

Unit 9900 (formerly Unit 9700) is a division within the Israel Defense Forces (IDF), operating under the Intelligence Directorate. Its mission is to collect visual and geospatial intelligence for the IDF and other security forces. The unit is known for recruiting autistic soldiers specifically. Unit members are often otherwise exempted from military service and sign up via the Ro'im Rachok program or similar.

== History ==
In 2020 it was reported that 58% of the unit's members were women. It was also reported that the unit was using civilian drones as part of a new drone unit within unit 9900, as well as artificial intelligence.

In 2022, the unit was involved in Operation Breaking Dawn.

In 2024, the unit was involved in operations against Hezbollah, analysing "terabytes of data" to identify operatives.

In 2025, the unit was instrumental in Operation Roaring Lion, the IDF's strikes on Iran. They directed Israel's intelligence satellites to obtain images of Iran's facilities and anti-air defence systems.
