= Intelligence and public policy =

Interactions between intelligence testing and public policy

A large body of research indicates that IQ ("intelligence quotient") and similar measures vary between individuals and between certain groups, and that they correlate with socially important outcomes such as educational achievement, employment, crime, poverty and socioeconomic status.

In the United States, certain public policies and laws regarding employment, military service, education and crime incorporate IQ or similar measurements. Internationally, certain public policies, such as improving nutrition and prohibiting neurotoxins, have as one of their goals raising or preventing a decline in intelligence.

== Use of cognitive tests in the United States legal system and public policy ==
=== History ===
In the early 20th century, eugenics legislation was passed in many US states which allowed, or encouraged, sterilization of "feeble-minded" individuals.

In the 1927 case Buck v. Bell, Justice Oliver Wendell Holmes closed the 8–1 majority opinion upholding the sterilization of Carrie Buck, who along with her mother and daughter was labeled "feeble-minded", with the infamous phrase, "Three generations of imbeciles are enough."

Eugenics fell out of favor in the middle part of the century and is now widely denounced, though memories of the period continue to influence public policy.

=== US education ===
Cognitive test scores predict educational performance better than they predict any other outcome, and cognitive testing is pervasive in academics. Central policy issues concern the proper role of testing in assessing educational quality and in college admission; efforts to characterize and close the educational achievement gap between racial and socioeconomic groups in the US; and the importance of cognitive ability differences in educational affirmative action.

The existence of educational achievement gaps between racial and socioeconomic groups is broadly accepted; the source and stability of the gaps remain areas of active research and debate. The No Child Left Behind Act of 2001 (NCLB) is aimed explicitly at reducing achievement gaps by race. Federally defined formulas in NCLB call for elimination of all achievement disparity by 2014. Regardless of the source of the gap, most educators agree that it must be addressed. They often advocate equitable funding for education.

The 9th Circuit Court of Appeals interpreted state and federal statutes to require that IQ tests not be used in a manner that was determinative of tracking students into classes designed for the intellectually disabled. Larry P. v. Riles, 793 F.2d 969 (9th Cir. 1984). The court specifically found that the tests involved were designed and standardized based on an all-white population, and had not undergone a legislatively mandated validation process. In addition, the court ruled that predictive validity for a general population is not sufficient, since the rights of an individual student were at issue, and emphasized that had the tests not been treated as controlling but instead used as part of a thorough and individualized assessment by a school psychologist a different result would have been obtained. In September 1982, the judge in the Larry P. case, Federal District Judge Robert F. Peckham, relented in part in response to a lawsuit brought by black parents who wanted their children tested. The parents' attorney, Mark Bredemeier, said his clients viewed the modern special education offered by California schools today as helpful to children with learning disabilities, not a dead-end track, as parents contended in the original 1979 Larry P. case.

A major area of controversy regarding the NCLB Act is whether achievement gaps are the result of "the soft bigotry of low expectations" or reflect real cognitive ability differences between groups. Because the Act includes warnings and funding consequences for schools which do not meet performance goals, whether disparate student performance is due primarily to environment (which is perceived to be under substantial school and teacher control) or to genetics (which is perceived to be far less malleable) has become a crucial issue.

Gifted education and special education programs aim to provide tailored instruction to students with especially high or low ability. Research in both civilian and military training has demonstrated that bright individuals learn 2–5 times faster than their less able peers.

=== Employment ===
One summary of the relationship between employment policy and IQ testing is provided by Murphy (2002):

Cognitive ability tests represent the best single predictor of job performance, but also represent the predictor most likely to have substantial adverse impact on employment opportunities for members of several racial and ethnic minority groups. Debates over the use of these tests in selection often involve trade-offs between two criteria that are valued by decision makers – that is, efficiency and equity. Findings and methods from decision research can help us frame these trade-offs, but in most cases they cannot be avoided.

Before the late twentieth century, on the basis of studies showing widely varying validities for personnel selection techniques, the theory of "situational specificity" held sway. This principle holds that each organization, work setting and job is unique, requiring unique employee characteristics or skills, and that selection on any general ability yields little benefit. However, the development of statistical techniques such as meta-analysis allowed large samples to be assembled from smaller studies, revealing that apparent validity variations reflected statistical artifacts. Re-analysis, and subsequent studies, have established that general mental ability (IQ) predicts job performance across all jobs. The validity of IQ varies most notably with job complexity: IQ matters little for simple jobs such as packing, and a great deal in complex jobs such as medicine.

These findings have major significance. For example, racial groups differ in average performance on mental ability tests: East Asians on average score higher than Whites, who on average score higher than Blacks (see Race and intelligence for a more thorough discussion). Race-blind hiring on the basis of cognitive test score, among the best predictors of job performance, tends to lead to under-representation of some racial groups in favor of others, a phenomenon called "adverse impact" or "disparate impact" in employment law. (In contrast, "disparate treatment" refers to deliberate discrimination.)

In 1971, in the case Griggs v. Duke Power Co., the US Supreme Court handed down a seminal ruling which framed US public policy on adverse impact. Griggs concerned a company which had rejected a large number of Black applicants who either lacked a high-school education or performed poorly on a paper-and-pencil cognitive test. Referring to the Civil Rights Act of 1964 , the Court wrote,

The Act proscribes not only overt discrimination but also practices that are fair in form, but discriminatory in operation. The touchstone is business necessity. If an employment practice which operates to exclude Negroes cannot be shown to be related to job performance, the practice is prohibited.

Title VII of the Civil Rights Act generally prohibits employment practices that are unfair or discriminatory. One provision of Title VII, codified at 42 USC 2000e-2(h), specifically provides that it is not an "unlawful employment practice for an employer to give and to act upon the results of any professionally developed ability test provided that such test, its administration or action upon the results is not designed, intended or used to discriminate because of race, color, religion, sex or national origin." This statute was interpreted by the Supreme Court in Griggs v. Duke Power Co., 401 US 424 (1971). In Griggs, the Court ruled that the reliance solely on a general IQ test that was not found to be specifically relevant to the job at issue was a discriminatory practice where it had a "disparate impact" on hiring. The Court gave considerable weight in its ruling to an Equal Employment Opportunity Commission regulation interpreting Section 2002e-2(h)'s reference to a "professionally developed ability test" to mean "a test which fairly measures the knowledge or skills required by the particular job or class of jobs which the applicant seeks, or which fairly affords the employer a chance to measure the applicant's ability to perform a particular job or class of jobs." In other words, the use of any particular test would need to be shown to be relevant to the particular job or class of jobs at issue.

In 1989, the US Supreme Court decision in Wards Cove Packing Co. v. Atonio reduced the defendant's burden of proving business necessity to a burden of producing evidence of business justification. The Civil Rights Act of 1991 overturned that portion of the Wards Cove decision.

These decisions added a legal dimension to trade-offs between "efficiency and equity" referenced by Murphy. Though cognitive testing is generally inexpensive, reliable and valid, US employers risk expensive legal action if such testing produces disparate impact. In practice, companies have responded with a variety of strategies, from abandonment of cognitive testing to maintenance of racial hiring quotas. The latter derives from enforcement of the Equal Employment Opportunity Commission's "four-fifths rule", which states that any group selection rate that is less than four-fifths (80%) of the highest rate will be regarded by Federal enforcement agencies as evidence of adverse impact.

Attempts to formulate a test with reliability and validity equal to cognitive testing, but that does not produce disparate impact, have generally failed.

Microsoft is known for using non-illegal tests that correlate with IQ tests as part of the interview process, weighing the results even more than experience in many cases.

=== US military service ===
All US military recruits take the Armed Forces Qualification Test. A recruit's test scores in part determine the professions available to them.

The AFQT is part of the ASVAB, which also measures qualities such as spatial aptitude and general mechanical skill. Combined scores are used to see if a potential recruit qualifies for a certain position.

The U.S. military uses the Armed Forces Qualifying Test (AFQT), as higher scores correlate with significant increases in effectiveness of both individual soldiers and units.

=== US crime ===
In its 2002 ruling on the case Atkins v. Virginia, the US Supreme Court outlawed the execution of intellectually-disabled criminals on the grounds that it constituted cruel and unusual punishment, which is prohibited by the 8th Amendment. The designation of mental retardation (or developmental disability) typically requires a measured IQ below 70 or 75.

The Supreme Court of the United States has utilized IQ test results during the sentencing phase of some criminal proceedings. The Supreme Court case of Atkins v. Virginia, decided June 20, 2002, held that executions of mentally challenged criminals are "cruel and unusual punishments" prohibited by the Eighth Amendment. In Atkins the court stated that

"[I]t appears that even among those States that regularly execute offenders and that have no prohibition with regard to the mentally retarded, only five have executed offenders possessing a known IQ less than 70 since we decided Penry. The practice, therefore, has become truly unusual, and it is fair to say that a national consensus has developed against it."

In overturning the Virginia Supreme Court's holding, the Atkins opinion stated that petitioner's IQ result of 59 was a factor making the imposition of capital punishment a violation of his eighth amendment rights. In the opinion's notes the court provided some of the facts relied upon when reaching their decision

At the sentencing phase, Dr. Nelson testified: "Atkins' full scale IQ is 59. Compared to the population at large, that means less than one percentile. ... Mental retardation is a relatively rare thing. It's about one percent of the population." App. 274. According to Dr. Nelson, Atkins' IQ score "would automatically qualify for Social Security disability income." Id., at 280. Dr. Nelson also indicated that of the over 40 capital defendants that he had evaluated, Atkins was only the second individual who met the criteria for mental retardation. Id., at 310. He testified that, in his opinion, Atkins' limited intellect had been a consistent feature throughout his life, and that his IQ score of 59 is not an "aberration, malingered result, or invalid test score." Id., at 308.

Individuals with IQs below 70 have been essentially exempted from the death penalty in the U.S. since 2002, even though this cannot be definitely confirmed.

=== US Social Security ===
The Social Security Administration also uses IQ results when deciding disability claims. In certain cases, IQ results alone are used (in those cases where the result shows a "full scale IQ of 59 or less") and in other cases IQ results are used along with other factors (for a "full scale IQ of 60 through 70") when deciding whether a claimant qualifies for Social Security Disability benefits.

== Race issues ==
The public policy implications of intelligence research have often been defined by debates surrounding race and intelligence.

Pseudoscientific claims of inherent differences in intelligence between races have played a central role in the history of scientific racism. The first tests showing differences in IQ scores between different population groups in the United States were the tests of United States Army recruits in World War I. In the 1920s, groups of eugenics lobbyists argued that these results demonstrated that African Americans and certain immigrant groups were of inferior intellect to Anglo-Saxon white people, and that this was due to innate biological differences. In turn, they used such beliefs to justify policies of racial segregation. However, other studies soon appeared, contesting these conclusions and arguing instead that the Army tests had not adequately controlled for environmental factors, such as socioeconomic and educational inequality between black people and white people. Later observations of phenomena such as the Flynn effect, and the steady closing of the gap between black and white Americans, along with recognition of disparities in access to prenatal care, all highlighted ways in which environmental factors affect group IQ differences. In recent decades, as understanding of human genetics has advanced, claims of inherent differences in intelligence between races have been broadly rejected by scientists on both theoretical and empirical grounds.
