= Torato Umanuto =

Term in Judaism

Torato Umanuto (Hebrew: תּוֹרָתוֹ אֻמָּנוּתוֹ, lit. 'Torah study is his job') is a term in Judaism originating from the Talmud to describe someone who devotes time to the study of the Torah, so that Torah is their profession. Such a person has a special status in Halakha.

In Israel, this term is also commonly used to discuss Haredi conscription in the country, where many Haredim are exempt from military service through this principle of Torato Umanuto.

== Origin ==
The term "Torato Umanuto" describes in the Talmud individuals who are devoted solely to studying Torah, without interruption. In the tractate Shabbat, Rabbi Johanan bar Nappaha excludes himself from the group of students devoted to studying Torah:

For it was taught: If companions [scholars] are engaged in studying, they must break off for the reading of the shema, but not for prayer. R. Johanan said: This was taught only of such as R. Simeon b. Yohai and his companions, whose Torah study was their occupation.

— b. Talmud, tractate Shabbat, 11a

Nachmanides and Joseph ibn Migash quotes the words of Rabbi Isaac Alfasi: “A scholar whose Torah is his profession, that is, whose Torah is established and whose business is a layman, but not one whose business is established and whose Torah is not established.” Following this, the Torah ruled: “If he has a little art or a little negotiation to support himself with and not to become rich, and whenever he is free from his business he repeats the words of Torah and studies frequently, his Torah shall be his profession.” These matters were also ruled in the Shulchan Aruch.

== Halakha ==
The subject of Torah and work is discussed in Tractate Berakhot:

Our rabbis gave: “And you shall gather your grain” – what is the Talmud to say? Since it is said, “This book of the Torah shall not depart from your mouth.” Can things be written as they are?! The Talmud to say, “And you shall gather your grain” – the one who practices them is a custom of the land; the words of Rabbi Ishmael.

Rabbi Shimon bar Yochai says: It is possible for a person to plow at the time of plowing, sow at the time of sowing, reap at the time of harvest, thresh at the time of threshing, and sow at the time of wind. What is the Torah about it? Except that while the Israelites are doing the will of a place – their work is done by others, as it is said, “And strangers shall stand and pasture your flocks, etc.” And while the Israelites are not doing the will of a place – their work is done by themselves, as it is said, “And you shall gather your grain.” And what is more, the work of others is done by them, as it is said, “And you shall serve your enemies, etc.”

Abaye said: Many did as Rabbi Ishmael did, and it was done by them; Rabbi Shimon bar Yochai, and it did not come to their aid.

— tractate Berakhot

Some have learned from Abaye's words that the halakha is according to the words of Rabbi Yishmael, and that one must combine Torah and work for the sake of earning a living.

Maimonides, in the Laws of Talmud Torah, categorically rules that Talmud Torah must be conducted with a secular approach (work). Arguments regarding the agreement between Issachar and Zebulun, according to which part of the people engage in Torah and the other part engages in commerce and supports the learners, are rejected by Maimonides in his commentary on the Mishnah .[ 6 ]And he claims that this only applies to someone who gives his wealth to merchants so that they can trade his wealth and make a profit for him, but making a living from charity is prohibited.

Others, on the other hand, ruled Because in our generation, if you practice Torah with work, the Torah is not fulfilled, and therefore it is necessary to fulfill the agreement of Issachar and Zebulun, and it is permissible to study without earning a living, and to live off of alms, even from tax payments forced on the public.

Today, the status of "Torah is our art" is considered the ideal of most Torah students. In the prayer said at the end of studying a tractate, they say, "May it be your will that your Torah be our art".

=== Compliance with laws ===
In Arba'ah Turim and in the Shulchan Aruch, it was ruled that a scholar whose "Torah is his art" is exempt from paying taxes and security duties, as well as from compulsory community work such as digging water wells, but must pay the digging workers, if they were hired.

== See also ==
- Torah study
- Haredi conscription in Israel
