= Armed Services Vocational Aptitude Battery =

Educational assessment administered by the U.S. military

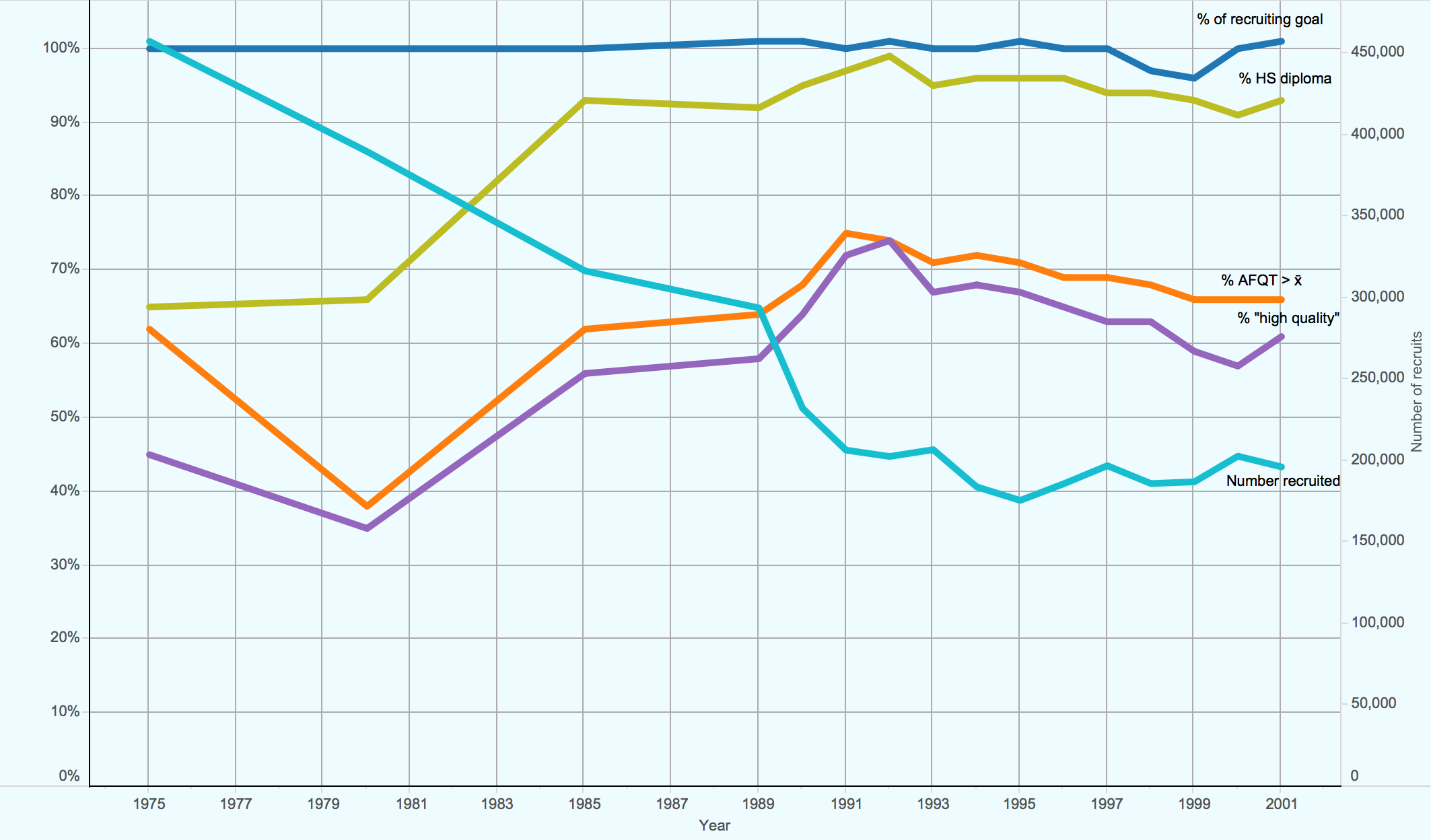
Trends in recruiting 1975–2001 showing total numbers of enlisted recruits in all branches of U.S. armed forces in light blue and percentage of recruiting goals met in dark blue. The percentage of recruits with at least a high school diploma is shown in gold, percentage with an above-average AFQT in orange, and the percentage called "high quality", with both a diploma and above-average AFQT score, is in purple.

The Armed Services Vocational Aptitude Battery (ASVAB) is a multiple choice test, administered by the United States Military Entrance Processing Command, used to determine qualification for enlistment in the United States Armed Forces. It is often offered to U.S. high school students when they are in the 10th, 11th and 12th grade, though anyone eligible for enlistment may take it.

== History ==
The ASVAB was first introduced in 1968 and was adopted by all branches of the military in 1976. It underwent a major revision in 2002. In 2004, the test's percentile rank scoring system was renormalized, to ensure that a score of 50% really did represent doing better than exactly 50% of the test takers.

== Categories ==
=== Format ===
The ASVAB contains nine sections and takes three hours to complete. The duration of each section varies between 7 and 39 minutes, the longest being for Arithmetic Reasoning. The test is typically administered in a computerized format (the CAT-ASWAB for (Computerized adaptive testing)) at Military Entrance Processing Stations (MEPS) or in a written format (P&P-ASWAB) at satellite locations called Military Entrance Test (MET) sites. Testing procedures vary depending on the mode of administration.

==== Computerized test format (CAT-ASVAB) ====
Test	Abbreviation	Domain	Content
General Science	(GS)	Science/Technical	15 questions in 8 minutes
Arithmetic Reasoning	(AR)	Math	15 questions in 39 minutes
Word Knowledge	(WK)	Verbal	15 questions in 8 minutes
Paragraph Comprehension	(PC)	Verbal	10 questions in 22 minutes
Mathematics Knowledge	(MK)	Math	15 questions in 20 minutes
Electronics Information	(EI)	Science/Technical	15 questions in 8 minutes
Automotive and Shop Information	(AS)	Science/Technical	10 questions in 7 minutes
Mechanical Comprehension	(MC)	Science/Technical	15 questions in 20 minutes
Assembling Objects	(AO)	Spatial	15 questions in 40 minutes
Verbal Expression	(VE)	Not a test, just a combined score: Score = (WK)+(PC)	

The tests are presented in the order in which they are administered.

==== Written test format (P&P-ASVAB) ====
Test	Abbreviation	Content
General Science	(GS)	45 questions in 20 minutes
Arithmetic Reasoning	(AR)	30 questions in 36 minutes
Word Knowledge	(WK)	35 questions in 11 minutes
Paragraph Comprehension	(PC)	15 questions in 13 minutes
Mathematics Knowledge	(MK)	25 questions in 24 minutes
Electronics Information	(EI)	20 questions in 9 minutes
Automotive and Shop Information	(AS)	25 questions in 11 minutes
Mechanical Comprehension	(MC)	25 questions in 19 minutes
Assembling Objects	(AO)	25 questions in 15 minutes
Verbal Expression	(VE)	Score = (WK)+(PC)

Navy applicants also complete a Coding Speed (CS) test.

=== Previous ===
- "Numerical Operations" (NO)
- "Space Perception" (SP)
- "Tool Knowledge" (TK)
- "General Information" (GI)
- "Attention to Detail" (AD)
- "Coding Speed" (CS)

== Armed Forces Qualification Test ==
The Armed Forces Qualification Test (AFQT) is not a test, rather, it is the score obtained by taking the ASVAB. The AFQT is used to determine basic qualifications for enlistment.

The AFQT scores are divided into the following categories

- Category I: 93–99%
- Category II: 65–92%
- Category III A: 50–64%
- Category III B: 31–49%
- Category IV A: 21–30%
- Category IV B: 16–20%
- Category IV C: 10–15%
- Category V: 0–9%

- The formula for computing an AFQT score is: AR + MK + (2 × VE).

- The VE (verbal) score is determined by adding the raw scores from the PC and WK tests and using a table to get the VE score from that combined PC and WK raw score.

- AFQT scores are not raw scores, but rather percentile scores indicating how each examinee performed compared with the base youth population. For example, if someone receives an AFQT score of 55 that means they scored higher than 55 percent of all other members of the base youth population. The highest possible percentile score is 99.

- The minimum score for enlistment varies according to branch of service and whether the enlistee has a high school diploma.

Minimum AFQT
	Tier I	Tier II
Branch	≥ HS Diploma	= GED
Army	31	50
Marines	31	50
Air Force	31	50
Navy	31	50
Coast Guard	40	50 with 15 college credits
*Army National Guard	31	50
*Air National Guard	50	50

GED holders who have earned 15 college credits in courses at the 100 level or higher are considered equivalent to those holding high school diplomas, so they need only the Tier I score to enlist. However, eligibility is not determined by the score alone. Depending on current recruitment goals an applicant may be required to achieve a higher score than the required minimum AFQT score in order to be considered for enlistment. Up-to-date information about eligibility requirements can be obtained from local recruiting centers.

Applicants in Category V are legally ineligible for enlistment. Applicants in Category IV must be high school diploma holders (unless they are needed to satisfy “established strength” requirements). The law limits the percentage of accessions who can fall between Categories IV and V (currently, the limit is 20% of all persons originally enlisted in a given armed force in a given fiscal year).

== Composite scores ==
In addition to the ASVAB's AFQT, each branch has military occupational specialty, or MOS, scores. Combinations of scores from the nine tests are used to determine qualification for a MOS. These combinations are called "aptitude area scores", "composite scores", or "line scores". Each of the five armed services has its own aptitude area scores and sets its own minimum composite scores for each MOS.

Army/Army National Guard Composite Scores
CL	Clerical	VE+AR+MK
CO	Combat Operations	VE+AS+MC
EL	Electronics	GS+AR+MK+EI
FA	Field Artillery	AR+MK+MC
GM	General Maintenance	GS+AS+MK+EI
GT	General Technical	WK+PC+AR
MM	Mechanical Maintenance	AS+MC+EI
OF	Operators and Food	VE+AS+MC
SC	Surveillance and Communications	VE+AR+AS+MC
ST	Skilled Technical	VE+GS+MC+MK
* SF	Special Forces	GT≥110 CO≥100

Navy Line Scores
GT	General Technical	AR+VE
EL	Electronics	AR+EI+GS+MK
BEE	Basic Electricity and Electronics	AR+GS+2*MK
ENG	Engineering	AI+EI+MK
MEC	Mechanical Maintenance	AR+AI+SI+MC
MEC2	Mechanical Maintenance 2	AO+AR+MC
NUC	Nuclear Field	AR+MC+MK+VE
OPS	Operations Specialist	WK, PC, AR, MK, AO
HM	Hospital Corpsman (medical)	GS+MK+VE
ADM	Administrative	MK+VE
* SEALs	Special Operations	GS+MC+EI≥165 or VE+MK+MC+CS≥220 (minimum for BUD/S)

Coast Guard Line Scores
AET	Aviation Electrical Technician	MK+EI+GS≥172 & AR≥52 or AFQT≥65
AMT	Aviation Maintenance Technician	AR+MC+AS+EI≥220 & AR≥52 or AFQT≥65
AST	Aviation Survival Technician	VE+MC+AS≥162 & AR≥52 or AFQT≥65
BM	Boatswain's Mate	VE+AR≥100
DC	Damage Controlman	VE+MC+AS≥155
EM	Electrician's Mate	MK+EI+GS≥153 & AR≥52
ET	Electronics Technician	MK+EI+GS≥172 & AR≥52 or AFQT≥65
FS	Food Service Specialist	VE+AR≥105
GM	Gunner's Mate	AR+MK+EI+GS≥209
HS	Health Services Technician	VE+MK+GS+AR≥207 & AR≥50
IS	Intelligence Specialist	VE+AR≥109
IT	Information Systems Technician	MK+EI+GS≥172 & AR≥52 or AFQT≥65
ME	Maritime Enforcement Specialist	VE+AR≥100
MK	Machinery Technician	AR+MC+AS≥154 or VE+AR≥105
MST	Marine Science Technician	VE+AR≥114 & MK≥56
OS	Operational Specialist	VE+AR≥105
PA	Public Affairs Specialist	VE+AR≥109 & VE≥54
SK	Storekeeper	VE+AR≥105 & VE≥51
YN	Yeoman	VE+AR≥105

Air Force/Air National Guard Composite Scores (Standard AFQT score AR + MK + (2 x VE))

M	Mechanical	GS + MC + AS
A	Administrative	VE
G	General	VE + AR
E	Electrical	AR + MK + EI + GS

Marine Corps Line Score:
CL	Clerical	VE+AR+MK
EL	Electronics	GS+AR+MK+EI
GT	General Technical	VE+AR
MM	Mechanical Maintenance	NO+AS+MC+EI
ST	Skilled Technical	GS+VE+MK+MC
* MARSOC	Special Operations	GT=105

== See also ==
- Intelligence and public policy
- Project 100,000
