= Shaham =

Shaham or Shacham (Hebrew: שחם) is a Hebrew surname. Notable people with the surname include:

- Assaf Shaham, Israeli artist
- Gil Shaham, American and Israeli violinist
- Hagai Shaham, Israeli-born American violinist
- Hovav Shacham, "S" in BLS digital signature
- Nathan Shaham, Israeli writer
- Ofir Shaham (born 2004), Israeli team world champion rhythmic gymnast
- Orli Shaham, Israeli-born American pianist
- Rinat Shaham, Israeli-born singer

== See also ==
- Shaham (שח"מ) is also an abbreviation for Mandatrory Police Service, Israel.
