= Leibel =

Leibel can be a given name or a surname. Notable people with the name include:

== Given name ==
- Leibel Bergman, American communist activist
- Leibel Groner, American rabbi

== Surname ==
- Allan Leibel (born 1945), Canadian sailor
- Blake Leibel (born 1981), Canadian murderer
- David Leibel, Israeli Haredi rabbi
- Kyla Leibel (born 2001), Canadian swimmer
- Lorne Leibel (born 1941), Canadian sailor
- Rudolph Leibel (born 1942), American research professor
- Stanley Leibel (born 1927), Canadian sailor
- Terry Leibel, Canadian journalist and equestrian
- David Leibel, Israeli rabbi

== See also ==
- Leib
- Leibl
