= Geriatric Park =

Geriatric Park may refer to:

- Geriatric Park, a 1994 British film by Backyard Productions UK
- "Geriatric Park", an episode of the television series Bobby's World
- Geriatric Park, a fictional retirement home in The Simpsons episode "Treehouse of Horror XXIX"
