= List of Bobby's World episodes =

This is a list of episodes from the Fox animated television series Bobby's World. The series premiered on September 8, 1990 and ended on February 23, 1998. A total of 81 half-hour episodes were produced.

== Series overview ==
Season	Episodes	Originally released	
Season	Episodes	First released	Last released
1	13	September 8, 1990	January 19, 1991
2	8	September 7, 1991	November 16, 1991
3	13	August 29, 1992	May 8, 1993
4	13	September 18, 1993	February 26, 1994
5	13	September 12, 1994	February 20, 1995
6	11	September 11, 1995	November 4, 1996
7	10	September 6, 1997	February 23, 1998

== Episodes ==
=== Season 1 (1990–91) ===
No. overall	No. in season	Title	Directed by	Written by	Storyboard by	Original release date	Prod. code
1	1	"The Visit to Aunt Ruth's"	Bernard Wolf, Mike Wolf & Jeff Hall	Jim Staahl & Jim Fisher	Al Zegler, Craig Kellman, Gary Hoffman & Bill Barry	September 8, 1990	BW-101
Bobby doesn't want to visit Aunt Ruth's house. He thinks he'll be bored and that she stinks. However, Bobby finds that being with his Aunt Ruth is actually fun and he begins to look forward to going to Aunt Ruth's again.
2	2	"Uncle Ted's Excellent Adventure"	Bernard Wolf & Mike Wolf	Jim Staahl & Jim Fisher	Andrew Austin, Gary Conrad & Bill Perez	September 15, 1990	BW-102
Uncle Ted and Bobby decide to have a campout in the back yard. This is Bobby's first time sleeping outside and he does not know if he is ready. At first Bobby can't wait, but when he finally camps out with Uncle Ted, he is scared by many things. At the end of the episode the whole family ends up roughing it for the night with Bobby and Uncle Ted.
3	3	"Adventures in Bobby Sitting"	Tom Tataranowicz & Mike Wolf	Jim Staahl & Jim Fisher	Gary Hoffman, Craig Kellman & Bill Perez	September 22, 1990	BW-103
Bobby's parents and Kelly are going out. Bobby and Derek are upset because they are getting a babysitter, but things turn out better than they thought.
4	4	"The Best One of the Mall"	Bernard Wolf & Mike Wolf	Dianne Dixon	Andrew Austin, Gary Conrad & Gary Hoffman	October 6, 1990	BW-105
Bobby goes with Kelly and Derek to the mall, but ends up getting lost.
5	5	"My Dad Can Fix Anything"	Mike Wolf, Bernard Wolf & Tom Tataranowicz	Betty G. Birney	Mitch Schauer, Craig Kellman & Pete Alvarado	October 20, 1990	BW-104
Howie tries to fix a plumbing problem in the house.
6	6	"Me and Roger"	Bernard Wolf & Mike Wolf	Jim Staahl & Jim Fisher	Gary Hoffman, Craig Kellman & Bill Perez	November 3, 1990	BW-106
Bobby shows Roger his leash and he runs away. Now everyone has to find Roger.
7	7	"The Big Sweep"	Mike Wolf, Bernard Wolf & Tom Tataranowicz	Dianne Dixon	Mitch Schauer, Del Barras & Byron Vaughns	November 10, 1990	BW-107
Bobby loses one of his mom's irreplaceable bedroom slippers.
8	8	"The Night of the Living Pumpkin"	Mike Wolf, Bernard Wolf & Ron Myrick	Betty G. Birney	Mitch Schauer, Gary Hoffman & Craig Kellman	November 24, 1990	BW-108
It's Halloween and Bobby is too little to go trick-or-treating, so Uncle Ted helps Bobby turn the house into a Halloween house of horror. The trick-or-treaters have to pay money to Ted and give candy to Bobby to go inside the house of horrors much to Derek's dismay.
9	9	"Beach Blanket Bobby"	Mike Wolf, Tom Tataranowicz & Jeff Hall	Jim Staahl & Jim Fisher	Gary Conrad, Craig Kellman, Pete Alvarado & Byron Vaughns	December 1, 1990	BW-109
Uncle Ted takes the family out on his new boat and they end up stranded on an uncharted island. Bobby enjoys being stranded; however, when a rescue group arrives, it causes Bobby to feel sad.
10	10	"The Revenge of Dr. Noo"	Mike Wolf, Tom Tataranowicz & Jeff Hall	Dianne Dixon	Gary Conrad, Craig Kellman, Pete Alvarado & Byron Vaughns	December 15, 1990	BW-110
Bobby is afraid to see a new doctor after watching a scary movie on television.
11	11	"In Search of the Ring Bear"	Mike Wolf, Bernard Wolf, Jeff Hall & Ron Myrick	Dianne Dixon	Gary Conrad, Gary Hoffman & Craig Kellman	January 5, 1991	BW-113
Bobby goes to a relative's wedding with his family. Bobby is looking forward to see the "Ring Bear", only to find out what the ring bearer actually is, leaving Bobby feeling disappointed.
12	12	"See America Last"	Mike Wolf, Bernard Wolf, Ron Myrick & Tom Tataranowicz	Betty G. Birney	Gary Conrad, Pete Alvarado & Byron Vaughns	January 12, 1991	BW-111
The family goes on a road trip to the Grand Canyon. Unfortunately, the trip doesn't go as smoothly as Howie thought it would.
13	13	"Bobby's Big Broadcast"	Mike Wolf, Bernard Wolf, Gary Conrad, Jeff Hall, Norm McCabe & Tom Ray	Dianne Dixon & Mitch Schauer	Mitch Schauer	January 19, 1991	BW-112
Uncle Ted takes Bobby to a museum while Bobby daydreams about cartoons.

=== Season 2 (1991) ===
No. overall	No. in season	Title	Directed by	Written by	Storyboard by	Original release date	Prod. code
14	1	"Three Kids and a Baby"	Ron Myrick & Jeff Hall	Jim Staahl & Jim Fisher	Gary Hoffman, Will Meugniot & Gary Conrad	September 7, 1991	BW-201
The Generic family finds out that Martha's pregnant. Bobby's friend Jackie also makes her first appearance.
15	2	"Suspects, Lies & Videotape"	Bernard Wolf & Ron Myrick	Dianne Dixon	Gary Conrad, Al Zegler, Karl Toerge & Chris Jenkyns	September 14, 1991	BW-202
Bobby accidentally crushes his mother's prized Elvis bust, but tries everything he can to pretend it never happened, even going as far as to blame Derek and Kelly for it.
16	3	"Clubhouse Bobby"	Bernard Wolf	Jim Staahl & Jim Fisher	Pete Alvarado, Gary Hoffman & Gary Conrad	September 21, 1991	BW-205
After Bobby feels left out when Kelly and her friends are into teen girl stuff, he finds inspiration from his father and Uncle Ted's Elephant Lodge, and decides to make a club in his treehouse. However, when his friends are reluctant to admit a kid named Rodney (based on Rodney Dangerfield) who just moved to the neighborhood, Bobby convinces his friends to give Rodney a chance.
17	4	"Nightmare on Bobby's Street"	Ron Myrick & Bernard Wolf	Jim Staahl & Jim Fisher	Andrew Austin, Mitch Schauer, Gary Conrad & Gary Hoffman	September 28, 1991	BW-207
Bobby watches a scary movie at the drive-in theater and has nightmares until Uncle Ted tries to help.
18	5	"Caution: Bobby at Work"	Bernard Wolf & Ron Myrick	Betty G. Birney	Marty Murphy, Gary Hoffman, Al Zegler & Gary Conrad	October 12, 1991	BW-203
Bobby spends a day at work with Howard at his office.
19	6	"Total Recess"	Jeff Hall, Ron Myrick & Bernard Wolf	Dianne Dixon	Gary Conrad, Adrian Gonzales, Wanda Brown & Geoffrey Everts	October 26, 1991	BW-206
Bobby has his first day at pre-school.
20	7	"Chariots of Bobby"	Ron Myrick & Bernard Wolf	Tony Marino	Andrew Austin, Gary Conrad & Adrian Gonzales	November 2, 1991	BW-204
Bobby's family pressures him to win when he enters the neighborhood Olympics.
21	8	"Bobby's Birthday Bash"	Ron Myrick & Bernard Wolf	Jim Staahl & Jim Fisher	Gary Hoffman, Gary Conrad, Marty Murphy & Mike Sosnowski	November 16, 1991	BW-208
Bobby's fifth birthday was put off by Martha going into labor, only to realize it is a false alarm. The rest of Bobby's family work to make his makeup party a success, such as Howie acting as magician with Kelly as his assistant.

=== Season 3 (1992–93) ===
No. overall	No. in season	Title	Directed by	Written by	Storyboard by	Original release date	Prod. code
22	1	"Bobby's Tooth or Dare"	Dave Brain & Ron Myrick	Jim Staahl & Jim Fisher	Gary Hoffman, Craig Kellman & Pete Alvarado	August 29, 1992	BW-301
Bobby loses his first baby tooth. Originally aired in a double feature with a rerun of Three Kids and a Baby.
23	2	"Bobby's Big Move"	Dave Brain, Allen Foster & Ron Myrick	Jim Staahl & Jim Fisher	Gary Hoffman, Brian Hogan & David Rodriguez	September 5, 1992	BW-302
Bobby and his family are moving to a new and bigger house, but Bobby isn't happy with it because he loves the old house.
24	3	"Bad News Bobby"	Vincent Davis, Ron Myrick & Jeff Hall	Mark Zaslove	Gary Hoffman, David Rodriguez & Brian Hogan	September 12, 1992	BW-303
Bobby takes up T-Ball after going to a baseball game with Howard.
25	4	"Swim by Me"	Vincent Davis & Tom Tataranowicz	Gary Marks	Gary Hoffman, David Rodriguez & Brian Hogan	September 19, 1992	BW-304
Bobby learns how to swim while he is afraid of a mysterious house until he meets the man who lives there, and finds out that the man isn't scary at all. This episode parodies the movie To Kill a Mockingbird.
26	5	"The Play's the Thing"	Dave Brain, Bob Nesler & Ron Myrick	Carol Corwen	Bob Nesler, Ann Telnaes, Mona Koth & Pete Alvarado	September 26, 1992	BW-305
Uncle Ted puts on a play. Bobby and the family are the performers, but all Bobby wants to do is sing!
27	6	"Fish Tales"	Ron Myrick, Tom Tataranowicz & Jeff Hall	Jim Staahl & Jim Fisher	Gary Hoffman, Andrew Austin & David Rodriguez	October 10, 1992	BW-306
The Generics take a fishing trip to Canada.
28	7	"The Music"	Allen Foster, Ron Myrick & Marlene Robinson May	Dianne Dixon & Peter Tilden	Bob Nesler, Craig Kellman, Barrington Bunce & Brian Hogan	October 17, 1992	BW-307
Bobby learns a life lesson from his friend Abe the crossing guard while having a test on shapes in school.
29	8	"Misery Loves Company"	Allen Foster & Bob Nesler	Carol Corwen	Gary Hoffman, Brian Hogan & David Rodriguez	October 24, 1992	BW-308
Bobby spends the night with a friend who keeps blaming him for his own bad behavior. A parody of Misery by Stephen King.
30	9	"Bobby Phone Home"	Dave Brain, Bob Nesler & Marlene Robinson May	Tino Insana	Gary Hoffman, Brian Hogan & David Rodriguez	November 7, 1992	BW-310
Bobby and Uncle Ted leave the house to take their housekeeper to a wedding. Little do they know that it's in Las Vegas. They are on an adventure to try to find a phone to call home to let them know where they are.
31	10	"Baby Brother Blues"	Bob Nesler, Ron Myrick & Dave Brain	Dianne Dixon & Peter Tilden	Gary Hoffman, Brian Hogan & David Rodriguez	November 14, 1992	BW-311
The baby is coming and Bobby is feeling left out because he's not getting any attention.
32	11	"Bobby's Girl"	Bob Nesler, Dave Brain & Marlene Robinson May	Carol Corwen	Andrew Austin, Brian Hogan, Ann Telanes & Mona Koth	November 21, 1992	BW-312
It's Valentine's Day and Bobby realizes he might like Jackie.
33	12	"Ill Effects"	Bob Nesler, Ron Myrick & Dave Brain	Sam Graham & Chris Hubbell	Gary Hoffman, Brian Hogan & David Rodriguez	November 28, 1992	BW-309
Uncle Ted tells Bobby stories while he is sick.
34	13	"I Want My Mommy"	Dave Brain, Ron Myrick & Marlene Robinson May	Jim Staahl & Jim Fisher	Brian Hogan & David Rodriguez	May 8, 1993	BW-313
The Generic family celebrates Mother's Day at an amusement park.

=== Season 4 (1993–94) ===
No. overall	No. in season	Title	Directed by	Written by	Storyboard by	Original release date	Prod. code
35	1	"The Hero"	Bob Treat, Marlene Robinson May & Klay Hall	Carol Corwen	Andrew Austin, Brian Hogan & Warren Greenwood	September 18, 1993	BW-401
When a missing baby is recovered in the Generics' backyard, Bobby is mistaken for a hero and showered with accolade and presents because the baby was holding Bobby's new shoes that Bobby ruined. Bobby's conscience, in the form of Captain Squash, says that Bobby must clear the air, but Bobby is also hounded by his temptation, in the form of a sleazy Hollywood agent, who says being the center of attention is the key to a happy childhood. After telling the truth, things are okay. When his mom mentions about going to ponyland, Bobby hopes he gets rewarded for ruining new pair of shoes next time.
36	2	"Uncle Ted's New Friend"	Bob Treat, Marlene Robinson May & Klay Hall	Chris Hubbell & Sam Graham	Rachel Brenner, Tony Craig & Gary Hoffman	September 25, 1993	BW-402
Bobby discovers that Uncle Ted's new girlfriend is a thief.
37	3	"The World Accordion to Bobby"	Bob Treat, Mike Wolf, Marlene Robinson May, Ron Myrick & Klay Hall	Grant Moran	Pete Alvarado, Andrew Austin & Gary Hoffman	October 2, 1993	BW-403
Martha and Aunt Ruth make Bobby take up the accordion.
38	4	"Bobby Ties the Knot"	Bob Treat, Robert Shellhorn & Dave Brain	Carol Corwen	Jim Schumann, Rachel Brenner & Stark Howell	October 9, 1993	BW-404
Bobby develops a crush on a substitute teacher.
39	5	"Jets, Choo-Choos, and Cars"	Bob Treat, Marlene Robinson May, Ron Myrick & Klay Hall	Jim Staahl, Jim Fisher, Dianne Dixon & Peter Tilden	Andrew Austin, Rachel Brenner & Gary Hoffman	October 16, 1993	BW-405
In an effort to get some rest, Martha and Howard send Bobby and Derek to their grandmother in Minnesota. Unfortunately, they miss their connection, thanks to Bobby's antics and Derek's irresponsibility. Ironically, this gives Martha and Howard the rest they needed. Now Derek is the one who needs rest after putting up with his little brother.
40	6	"Karate Bobby"	Bob Treat, Tom Tataranowicz & Robert Shellhorn	Carol Corwen	Brian Hogan, Rachel Brenner & Stark Howell	October 23, 1993	BW-406
Bobby takes up karate to fend off bullies, but gets himself into trouble for misusing his skills. This episode is a parody of The Karate Kid.
41	7	"A Day with Dad"	Bob Treat, Brian Hogan & Dave Brain	Chris Hubbell & Sam Graham	Andrew Austin, Gary Hoffman & Jim Schumann	November 6, 1993	BW-407
Bobby helps his father and Uncle Ted fix the bathroom light so he can go to the amusement park. Meanwhile, Bobby admires a man who makes many "easy fix" gadgets, only to learn that he is the father of his friend Peter, and is rather distant with Peter. Bobby finally figures out "it is not what dads have, it is what they do" when Mr. Generic takes Bobby and Peter to the amusement park and Bobby gets put on stage for a demonstration, only to quickly be brushed off.
42	8	"Psycho Bobby"	Bob Treat, Brian Hogan & Dave Brain	Jim Staahl & Jim Fisher	Brian Hogan, Bob Boyle & Bob Curtis	November 13, 1993	BW-408
Bobby tries to create a statue of his mom for her birthday and comes across as acting very odd from everyone else's point of view. This episode is a parody of Psycho.
43	9	"The Smell of a Tattletale"	Bob Treat, Mike Wolf, Dave Brain, Marlene Robinson May & Brian Hogan	Grant Moran	Andrew Austin, Rachel Brenner & Gary Hoffman	November 20, 1993	BW-409
Bobby starts telling all the moms everything their kids are doing, then wonders why the neighborhood kids are angry at him.
44	10	"It's My Party"	Brian Hogan, Klay Hall, Bob Treat & Dave Brain	Carol Corwen	Bob Curtis, Jim Schumann & Stark Howell	November 27, 1993	BW-410
Howard says he has to postpone his plans to help Bobby build a fort in order to help Martha host Kelly's sweet sixteen birthday party, which angers Bobby, and as a result, Bobby unintentionally ruins Kelly's party.
45	11	"One Clump or Two"	Brian Hogan, Marlene Robinson May & Ron Myrick	Carol Corwen	Bob Boyle, Rachel Brenner, Andrew Austin & Gary Hoffman	February 5, 1994	BW-411
Bobby tries to prove his friend Ozzy is innocent after a mysterious mud clump is thrown onto Martha, so that Ozzy can sleep over, especially since Ozzy's parents aren't in town. Special guest: Robbie Lee.
46	12	"Bobby's Big Dream"	Bob Treat, Dave Brain & Brian Hogan	David Castro, Jim Staahl & Jim Fisher	Bob Curtis, Brian Hogan & Jim Schumann	February 19, 1994	BW-412
Bobby goes out for an audition at the mall for a commercial. In the end, it turns out the whole thing was just a dream. Special guest: Kathy Ireland.
47	13	"Bobby, the Musical"	Bob Treat, Ron Myrick & Brian Hogan	Dianne Dixon & Peter Tilden	Andrew Austin, Gary Hoffman, Bob Boyle & Jim Schumann	February 26, 1994	BW-413
Bobby relives musical numbers from past episodes, ending with a finale of "If You're Happy and You Know It", when the family is stuck at home during a power outage caused by a rainstorm.

=== Season 5 (1994–95) ===
No. overall	No. in season	Title	Directed by	Written by	Storyboard by	Original release date	Prod. code
48	1	"Rebel Without a Clue"	Bob Nesler, Marlene Robinson May & Bob Treat	Grant Moran	Brian Hogan & David Feiss	September 12, 1994	BW-501
Bobby is influenced by a new boy named Anthony (Brad Garrett) to become bad, after Derek keeps pointing out to Bobby how short Bobby is for certain rides at the amusement park.
49	2	"Geriatric Park"	Michael Wolf, Ron Myrick, Marlene Robinson May & Bob Treat	Jim Staahl & Jim Fisher	Gary Hoffman, Jim Schumann & Brian Hogan	September 13, 1994	BW-502
Bobby goes to visit his great-grandpa Generic and learn about the many generations of his grandfather at Jerry Atric's Home for the Aged.
50	3	"Harry Takes a Powder"	Bob Nesler, Ron Myrick & Milton Gray	Carol Corwen	David Feiss, Michael Goguen, Gary Hoffman & Brian Hogan	September 14, 1994	BW-503
Bobby loses Jackie's hamster. This is a parody episode of An American Tail.
51	4	"Bobby's Big Boo-Boo"	Bob Treat, Brian Hogan & Swinton O. Scott III	Carol Corwen	David Feiss, Brian Hogan, Jim Schumann & Stark Howell	September 15, 1994	BW-504
Bobby needs to get his tonsils removed. When Derek tells horrible lies to him about surgery, Bobby tries to avoid going to the hospital; however, it failed miserably. Bobby was forced to go to the hospital. The doctors put him to sleep. Bobby has dreams of trying to avoid surgery; however, he's unaware that the doctors are doing surgery on him while he's sleeping.
52	5	"Mom on Wheels"	Milton Gray, Bob Nesler, Marlene Robinson May & Swinton O. Scott III	Dianne Dixon & Peter Tilden	Andrew Austin, Michael Goguen & Brian Hogan	September 16, 1994	BW-505
Bobby spends the day with his mom at her job at Big Roy's while his dad goes on a job interview.
53	6	"Weekend at Teddie's"	Swinton O. Scott III, Bob Treat, Bob Nesler & Marlene Robinson May	Jim Staahl & Jim Fisher	Stark Howell, Brian Hogan & Michael Goguen	November 7, 1994	BW-506
Bobby spends the weekend with Uncle Ted, where he learns to appreciate his homelife.
54	7	"Generics Under Construction"	Ron Myrick, Swinton O. Scott III & Bob Treat	Arnie Wess & Steve Brasfield	Adam Dykstra, Floyd Norman, Bob Boyle & Stark Howell	November 8, 1994	BW-507
Bobby must figure out how to tidy up his family's remodeled for a photographer.
55	8	"Mrs. Noogiefire"	Swinton O. Scott III, Marlene Robinson May, Chuck Sheetz & Mike Wolf	Jim Staahl & Jim Fisher	Stark Howell, Jim Schumann & Brian Hogan	November 14, 1994	BW-508
Uncle Ted dresses up as an elderly nanny to prove he can take care of the kids. This is a parody episode of Mrs. Doubtfire.
56	9	"Bobby Slicker"	Swinton O. Scott III, Bob Nesler & Marlene Robinson May	Dianne Dixon	Bob Nesler, Brian Hogan, Michael Goguen, Ken Boyer & Jim Schumann	November 21, 1994	70205-0009 / BW-509
Martha wins a sweepstakes and the family gets to go to dude ranch.
57	10	"No Sale"	Ron Myrick, Bob Treat, Bernard Wolf & Jeff Hall	Dianne Dixon, Peter Tilden, Jim Fisher, Jim Staahl & Carol Corwen	Stark Howell, Adam Dykstra & Brian Hogan	November 28, 1994	BW-510
Bobby tries to sell the most candy in the school money sale so he can win pair of skates. However, Bobby is up against a very competitive boy who would use cheat tactics to win. Bobby almost won; however, Bobby lost because of Bobby's naïve personally.
58	11	"Who You Gonna Call...???"	Mike Wolf, Swinton O. Scott III & Marlene Robinson May	Steve Brasfield	Jim Schumann, Andrew Austin & Michael Goguen	February 6, 1995	BW-511
Bobby gets locked out of his house and cannot figure out what he should do.
59	12	"Starring Bobby"	Bob Nesler, Ron Myrick, Jeff Hall & Mike Wolf	Jim Staahl & Jim Fisher	Stark Howell, Brian Hogan & Ken Boyer	February 13, 1995	BW-512
The TV is broken so Bobby acts out movies for Kelly and Derek.
60	13	"The Truth About Aunt Ruth"	Swinton O. Scott III, Brian Hogan & Marlene Robinson May	Howie Mandel, Jim Fisher, Jim Staahl & Dianne Dixon	Gary Hoffman, Stark Howell & Brian Hogan	February 20, 1995	BW-513
Bobby learns lessons about telling the truth, particularly when to keep it to himself. He then spends the day with Aunt Ruth to make up for hurting her feelings.

=== Season 6 (1995–96) ===
No. overall	No. in season	Title	Directed by	Written by	Storyboard by	Original release date	Prod. code
61	1	"Bobby On-Line"	Dave Brain, Bob Nesler, Marlene Robinson May & Brian Hogan	Steve Brasfield	Brian Hogan, Gary Hoffman & Stark Howell	September 11, 1995	BW-601
The Generic family gets a computer and chaos ensues. Bobby is the only one of the family that is not allowed to use it.
62	2	"Bobby the Genius"	Dave Brain, Brian Hogan, Pete Michels & Marlene Robinson May	Dianne Dixon, Jim Fisher, Jim Staahl & Bruce Taylor	Bob Boyle, Michael Goguen & Bob Curtis	September 12, 1995	BW-602
A university professor tells Bobby that he is a genius. It causes Bobby to become egotistical.
63	3	"Hooked on Caps"	Dave Brain, Brian Hogan, Pete Michels, Klay Hall, Marlene Robinson May & Bob Nesler	Mark McKain	Brian Hogan, Gary Hoffman, Brad Landreth & Jim Schumann	September 13, 1995	BW-603
Bobby discovers that he is good at playing caps.
64	4	"Bobby's Last Stand"	Brian Hogan, Klay Hall & Pete Michels	Timothy Williams	Bob Boyle, Bob Curtis & Stark Howell	September 14, 1995	BW-604
Bobby has to do chores to earn money to buy the X-15 Super Saturating Soaker Hose.
65	5	"Miracle on 34th St and Rural Route 1"	Dave Brain, Bob Nesler, Marlene Robinson May & Brian Hogan	Jim Staahl & Jim Fisher	Stark Howell, Gary Hoffman & John Conning	December 22, 1995	BW-605
Bobby learns about the true meaning of Christmas while visiting family.
66	6	"Just Plain Sleepless"	Klay Hall, Bob Treat, Ron Myrick, Marlene Robinson May & Brian Hogan	Brenda Lilly	Brian Hogan, Bob Boyle, Jim Schumann & Bob Curtis	February 5, 1996	BW-606
Bobby thinks that Uncle Ted is lonely and tries to find him a wife.
67	7	"Bobby, Lord of the Slopes"	Brian Hogan, Dave Brain & Marlene Robinson May	Jim Staahl & Jim Fisher	Gary Hoffman, Michael Goguen & Bob Nesler	February 12, 1996	BW-607
Uncle Ted takes the kids on a ski trip.
68	8	"Time After Time"	Dave Brain, Gordon Kent & Marlene Robinson May	Jim Fisher & Jim Staahl	Gary Hoffman, Tomihiro Yamaguchi & Andrew Austin	October 20, 1996	BW-611
Bobby learns the concept of time. Later in the final scene, Bobby & Jackie moved on to attend the Neighborhood Elementary School. Bobby walks with Derek to school now that they attend the same school.
69	9	"Independence Bobby"	Dave Brain, Gordon Kent, Marlene Robinson May & Fred Miller	Jim Fisher & Jim Staahl	Gary Hoffman & Alberto De Mello	October 27, 1996	BW-609
Bobby tries to be independent and wants to get a buzz cut for the 4th of July. He thinks 4th of July is to get what you want.
70	10	"Bobby the Candidate"	Dave Brain, Marlene Robinson May & Fred Miller	Steve Brasfield	Gary Hoffman & Alberto De Mello	November 4, 1996	BW-610
Bobby runs for class president. However, he's bad at running a campaign.
71	11	"The Importance of Being Ernest"	Brian Hogan, Dave Brain & Marlene Robinson May	Jim Staahl, Jim Fisher, Dianne Dixon & Peter Tilden	Gary Hoffman, Michael Goguen & Brian Hogan	May 6, 1996	BW-608
Bobby wants desperately to read Kelly's diary. But he can't read.

=== Season 7 (1997–98) ===
No. overall	No. in season	Title	Directed by	Written by	Storyboard by	Original release date	Prod. code
72	1	"Bad Manners Bobby"	Marlene Robinson May & Fred Miller	Jim Fisher & Jim Staahl	Bob Boyle, Gary Hoffman & Alberto De Mello	September 6, 1997	BW-701
Bobby learns about the importance of manners.
73	2	"Roger's Ransom"	Marlene Robinson May, Fred Miller & Ron Myrick	Dianne Dixon	Michael Goguen & John Conning	September 13, 1997	BW-702
Bobby thinks that Roger is kidnapped and held for ransom.
74	3	"Cooties"	Marlene Robinson May, Ron Myrick & Brian Hogan	Steve Brasfield	Bob Boyle, Gary Hoffman & Tomihiro Yamaguchi	September 20, 1997	BW-703
Bobby is worried that he has come down with a terrible disease... the cooties.
75	4	"Promises, Promises"	Marlene Robinson May & Ron Myrick	Brenda Lilly, Dianne Dixon, Howie Mandel, Jim Fisher & Jim Staahl	John Conning & Alberto De Mello	September 27, 1997	BW-704
Bobby learns a lesson about keeping his word.
76	5	"Generics and Indians"	Michel Lyman, Marlene Robinson May & Ron Myrick	Tino Insana	Jim Schumann, Gary Hoffman & Michael Goguen	November 22, 1997	BW-710
Bobby learns about the importance of Thanksgiving.
77	6	"It's a Generic Life"	Marlene Robinson May	Howie Mandel, Dianne Dixon, Peter Tilden, Jim Fisher & Jim Staahl	Bob Boyle & Gary Hoffman	November 8, 1997	BW-706
Bobby takes care of the twins and learns that they're not so bad after all.
78	7	"Cruisin' Bobby"	Bill Hutten, Michel Lyman & Ron Myrick	Jim Fisher & Jim Staahl	Bob Boyle, Gary Hoffman & Alberto De Mello	October 18, 1997	BW-705
The family goes on a cruise and Bobby learns a lesson about practical jokes.
79	8	"Dad's Big Day"	Michel Lyman, Marlene Robinson May & Ron Myrick	Dianne Dixon	John Conning, Robert Taylor & Alberto De Mello	November 15, 1997	BW-708
Bobby tries to figure out what to get his dad for Father's Day.
80	9	"Blue Eggs and Bobby"	Tom Tataranowicz, Dave Brain, Allen Wilzbach & Marlene Robinson May	Jim Fisher & Jim Staahl	Bob Boyle & Gary Hoffman	February 17, 1998	BW-707
Bobby has the blues because he is too young to play with Kelly and Derek and their friends.
81	10	"Back to the Furniture"	Marlene Robinson May, Allen Wilzbach, Mark Glamack & Ron Myrick	Jim Fisher & Jim Staahl	Stark Howell, Alberto De Mello & John Conning	February 23, 1998	BW-709
Bobby gets into trouble and gets three punishments by his dad for ruining Grandma's antique table with packing peanuts. He dreams of his parents as children, hoping to get Howard in trouble as revenge.
