= Desert Frontier =

- ספר המדבר
- Active: 2020–present
- Country: Israel
- Branch: Israeli Ground Forces
- Size: Dozens of soldiers

Desert Frontier (Hebrew: ספר המדבר, romanized: Sfar Hamidbar) is a unit of the Israeli Ground Forces in the West Bank, mostly in the Judaean Desert and Jordan Valley, and is manned by only a few dozen soldiers as a watchman unit.

== History ==
Desert Frontier was created in 2020 by the Israeli Ground Forces to recruit members of the Hilltop Youth for rehabilitation into Israeli society and to fight for Israel and not against, they were created as a tracking unit with the main goal to track down, arrest, or kill terrorists that flee scenes. They were the main tracking unit to arrest the terrorists involved in the 2022 El'ad stabbing, which they did after 62 hours on the assignment. The establishment was by Yuval Gaez, a commander of the commando unit Maglan at the time of the 2014 Gush Etzion kidnapping and murder, with the unit being created with only 12 soldiers selected by officers at farms in the Judea and Samaria Area that are owned and controlled by the Hilltop Youth. They train alongside the Haredi Netzah Yehuda Battalion and have their own base at a post near the Dead Sea, where they transferred in 2023 after reports of abuse against Palestinians both by Israeli citizens and Palestinians. Desert Frontier mostly does patrolling campaigns in armored vehicles in the Judaean Desert, where they would interrogate or arrest Palestinians suspected of terrorism or facilitation of terrorism.

In December 2023, the Israel Defense Forces halted operations by the Sfar Hamidbar and dismissed five soldiers after reports of violence against Palestinians. They also stopped recruitment at illegal outposts in the West Bank after this incident.
