= Haredi Military Administration =

- מנהלת החרדים הצבאית
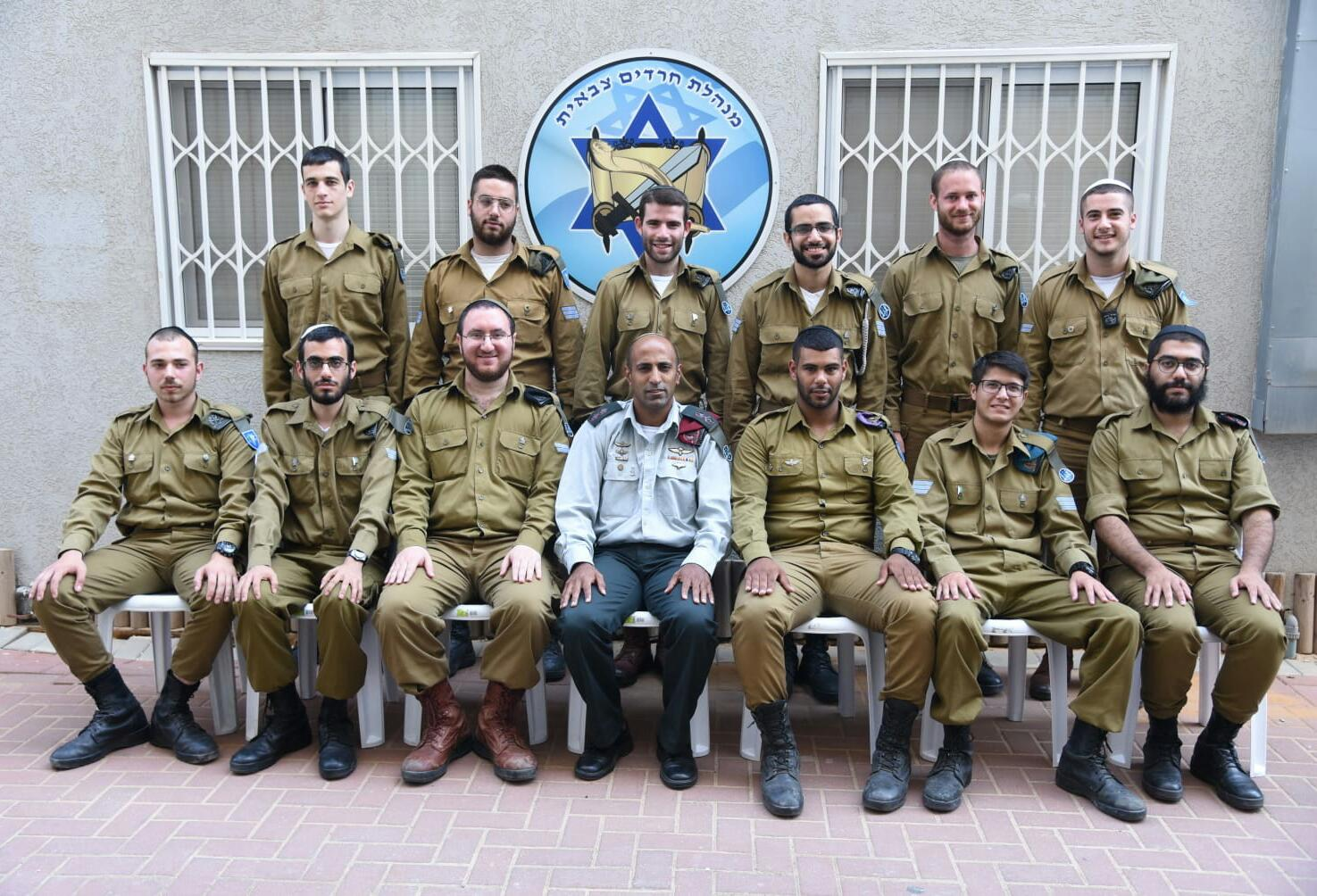
- Active: December 6th, 2017 - Present (7 years)
- Country: Israel
- Branch: Israel Defense Forces

The Haredi Military Administration (Hebrew: מנהלת החרדים הצבאית), also known by the acronym "Mahatz", is the Israel Defense Forces component responsible for Haredi military affairs and recruitment.

== See also ==
- Hasmonean Brigade
- Netzah Yehuda Battalion
- Shlav Bet
- Haredim and Zionism
