= Shlav Bet =

Israel Defense Forces recruitment track

Shlav Bet (Hebrew: שלב ב, English: Phase B) is an Israel Defense Forces recruitment track intended for Haredim over the age of 26 seeking to complete military service. The program is managed by the IDF's Haredi Military Administration.

== Training ==
Recruits undergo 2–3 weeks of basic training and then are integrated into various reserve units across Israel. The training process includes strict prayer times, kosher meals, and daily Torah study.

An additional 4-week training course, intended to allow for Haredi reservists to serve in homeland defense units, was introduced in March 2024.

== Gaza War ==
Since the October 7 attacks, 600 Haredim have enlisted through the Shlav Bet program.

In July 2024, Corporal Moti Raveh, a Haredi combat engineer and Magen David Adom paramedic serving with the Givati Brigade, was killed by a Hamas anti-tank missile which struck a bulldozer he was working on in southern Gaza. He was the first Shlav Bet recruit killed during the war.

== See also ==
- Hasmonean Brigade
- Netzah Yehuda Battalion
- Conscription of yeshiva students
