= Avinoam Emuna =

Israeli military commander

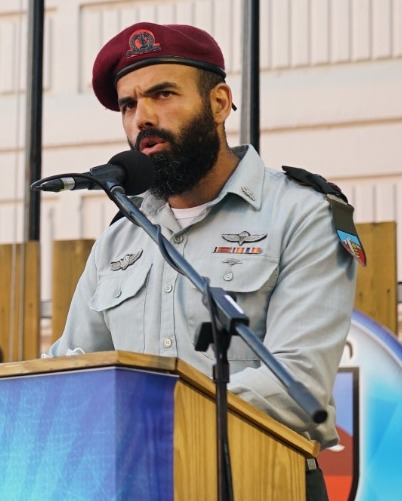
- Colonel Avinoam Emuna, 2020
- Born: 1980 (age 45–46); Rehovot, Israel
- Military career
- Allegiance: Israel
- Branch: Israel Defense Forces
- Service years: 1998–present
- Rank: Brigadier general
- Units: Maglan, Paratroopers Brigade
- Commands: Hasmonean Brigade; Hermon Brigade (810th Brigade); Tactical Command College; Golan Division; Maglan Unit; 101st Battalion
- Conflicts: South Lebanon conflict (1985–2000); Second Intifada; Operation Defensive Shield; 2006 Lebanon War; Operation Cast Lead; Operation Pillar of Defense; Operation Brother’s Keeper; Operation Protective Edge; Iron Swords War
- Awards: General’s Commendation

Avinoam Emuna (Hebrew: אבינועם אמונה ; born 1980) is a colonel in the Israel Defense Forces (IDF) who served as the commander of the Hasmonean Brigade. He was also commander of the Tactical Command College, Hermon Brigade (810th Brigade), Golan Division, the Maglan Unit, and the 101st Battalion.

== Biography ==
Avinoam Emuna grew up in Rehovot. He enlisted in the Israel Defense Forces in 1998, volunteered for the Paratroopers Brigade, and was assigned to the 101st Battalion. He completed infantry training, a squad commanders' course, and an infantry officers' course. Upon graduation, he returned to the 101st Battalion as a platoon commander and participated in combat in South Lebanon (1985–2000). He later served as a training company commander in the battalion, during which he began a process of religious return.

He was later appointed commander of the battalion's support company during the Second Intifada. During the 2006 Lebanon War, he joined combat as an officer in the battalion command post.

He was subsequently appointed commander of a combat platoon in the Maglan Unit, and later deputy commander of the unit. He later served as a training cycle commander at the Paratroopers Training Base.

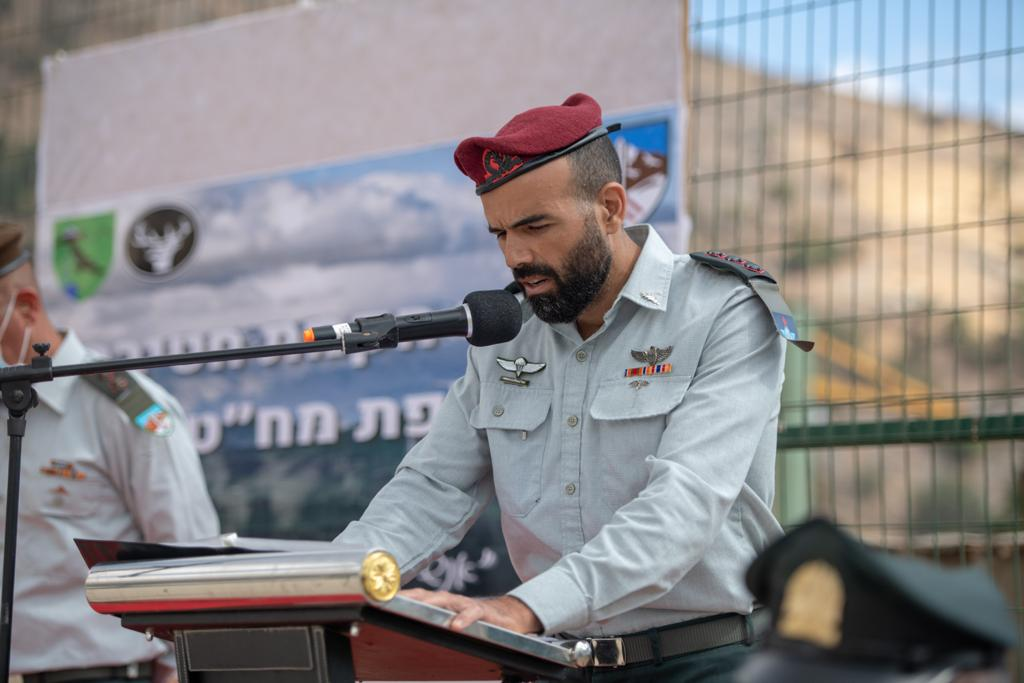
Re-establishment ceremony of the Hermon Brigade and appointment of Col. Emuna as brigade commander, September 2021

=== Lieutenant colonel roles ===
In 2013, he was promoted to lieutenant colonel and appointed head of the Infantry Branch at the Fire Training Center within MALY, serving until 2014.

In April 2014, he was appointed commander of the 101st Battalion, leading it during Operation Brother's Keeper and Operation Protective Edge. For its performance, the battalion received a General's Commendation. He concluded the role in June 2016.

On 31 July 2016, he was appointed commander of the Maglan Unit. During his tenure, the unit conducted a series of covert cross-border operations under the Campaign Between Wars framework. He served in this position until late May 2018.

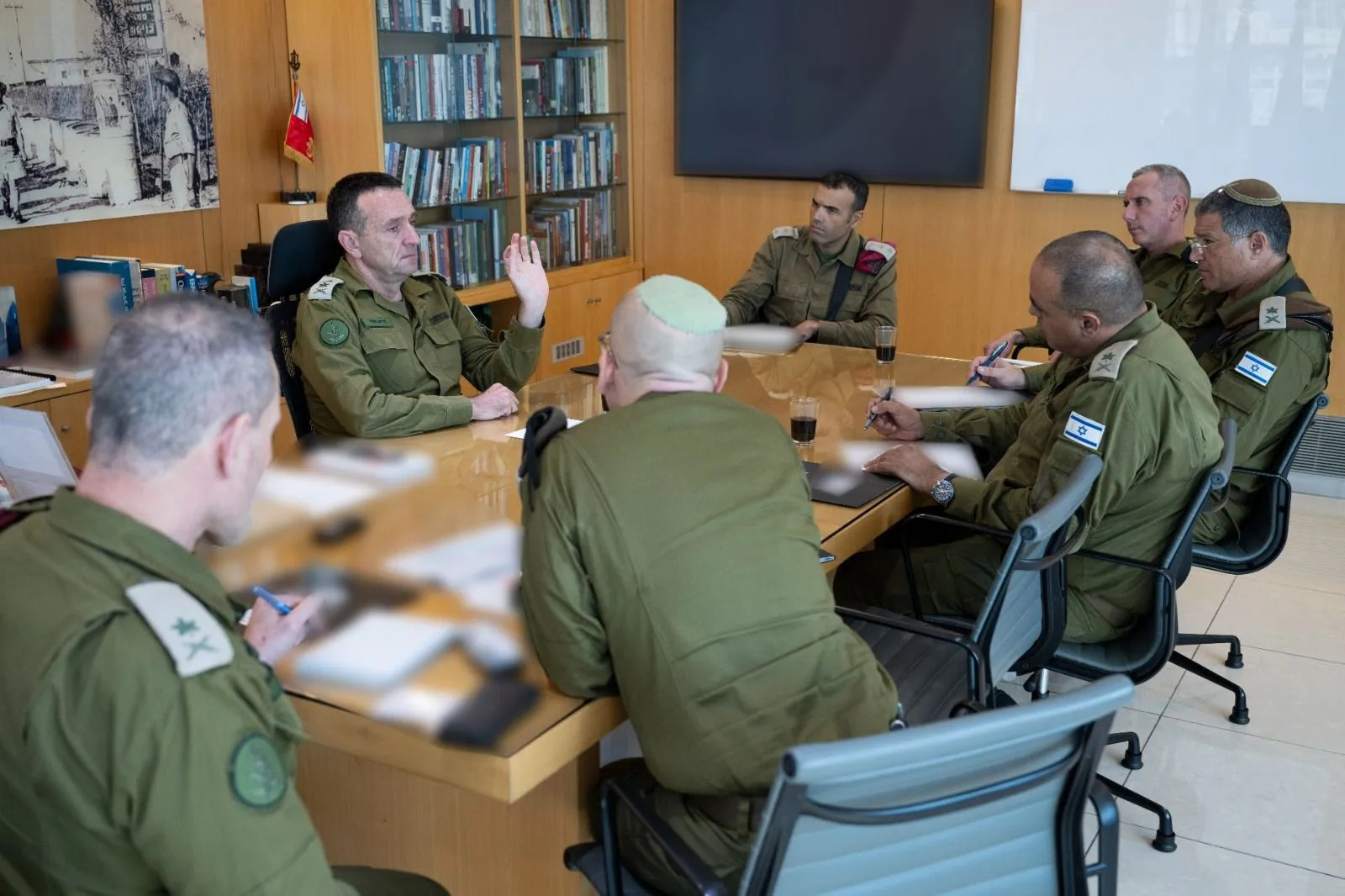
Col. Emuna meeting senior IDF officials regarding the establishment of the Hasmonean Brigade, November 2024

=== Colonel roles ===
On 15 July 2018, he was promoted to colonel and appointed commander of the Golan Division, serving until 6 July 2020.

In March 2021, IDF chief of staff Aviv Kochavi issued a reprimand and froze his promotion for two years after the serious injury of a Maglan soldier during an initiation ritual that was deemed dangerous. Although Emuna was not commanding the unit at the time, a similar incident occurred under his command, and it was determined that he had not sufficiently addressed the practice. Following the decision, he attended studies at the Royal College of Defence Studies in London.

On 17 August 2021, he was appointed commander of the Tactical Command College. On 12 September 2021, he was additionally appointed to establish and command the Hermon Brigade.

In April 2023, he met with Minister of National Security Itamar Ben-Gvir without notifying or receiving approval from his superiors. The meeting concerned a potential appointment as commander of the Israeli National Guard. As a result, he received a reprimand from the head of the Military Colleges.

On 13 June 2024, he concluded his role as commander of the Hermon Brigade (Brigade 810).

He was then appointed to establish and command the Hasmonean Brigade, the IDF's first regular ultra-Orthodox infantry brigade. He established the brigade under the supervision of Major Generals David Zini and Yaniv Asor and continues to command it. He is scheduled to conclude his role in January 2026.

On 25 January 2026, Chief of Staff Eyal Zamir announced Emuna's appointment as the chief of staff's adviser on Haredi affairs.

== Personal life ==
Emuna maintains a national-religious lifestyle, is married to Ortal, and has eight children. He resides in Rehovot.

== Publications ==
- "Leadership of the Commander on the Battlefield". Ma'arachot (in Hebrew) (461). 2015.
