= Masters of Menace =

1990 film

- Movie poster
- Directed by: Daniel Raskov
- Written by: Daniel Raskov; Tino Insana
- Produced by: Tino Insana; Catalaine Knell
- Starring: David Rasche; Catherine Bach; Tino Insana
- Music by: Hawk Wolinski
- Production company: CineTel Films
- Distributed by: New Line Cinema
- Release date: September 7, 1990
- Running time: 97 minutes
- Country: United States
- Language: English

Masters of Menace is a 1990 comedy film about a motorcycle gang.

== Plot ==
The Masters of Menace are a motorcycle club. When one of their own dies while testing his top fuel Harley, they decide to cross the country to go bury him. With the coffin in the back of the pick-up truck and the tight-butt lawyer in the front, their craving for beer combined with lack of manners will disturb quite a few people wherever they go, including law enforcement.

== Cast ==
- David Rasche as Buddy Wheeler
- Catherine Bach as Kitty Wheeler
- Tino Insana as Hank "Horny Hank"
- Lee Ving as Roy "Roy Boy"
- David Bowe as Joe "Sloppy Joe"
- Lonnie Parkinson as Frank "Fat Frank"
- Carol Ann Susi as Candy Colletti
- John Hazelwood as Larry "Lazy Larry"
- David L. Lander as "Squirt"
- C.E. Grimes as Chester
- Chris Oswald as "Wizard"
- Mike Petta as Mike
- Bill Reid as Bill
- Sam Turner as Sam
- Lance Kinsey as Wallace Wolfby
- Dan Aykroyd as Johnny Lewis
- Jim Belushi as "Gypsy"
- John Candy as Beer Truck Driver
- George Wendt as Dr. Jack Erheart
- Teri Copley as Sunny
- Ray Baker as Riley Hoover
- Malcolm Smith as Dick Schonweiller
- George Buck Flower as Sheriff Julip
- Robert Costanzo as Pilot
- Ron Taylor as Man At Door

== Home media ==
The film was released on VHS in the United States by RCA/Columbia.
