= David Rasche =

American actor

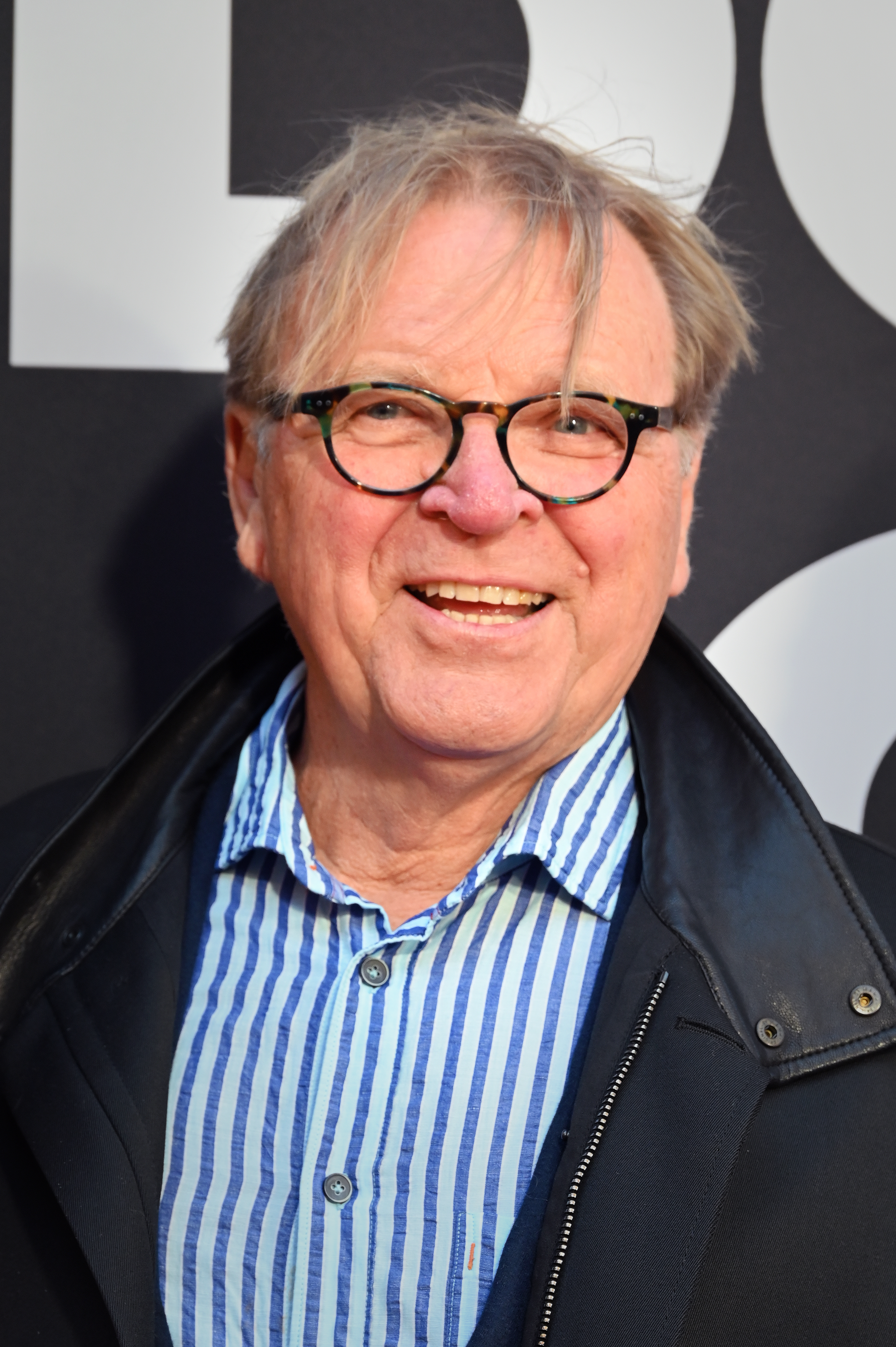
- Rasche in 2025
- Born: August 7, 1944 (age 82); St. Louis, Missouri, U.S.
- Education: Elmhurst College (BA); University of Chicago (MA)
- Occupation: Actor
- Years active: 1977–present
- Spouse: Heather Lupton (m. 1980)
- Children: 3

David Rasche (/ˈræʃi/ RASH-ee; born August 7, 1944) is an American theater, film, and television actor who is best known for his portrayal of the title character in the 1980s satirical police sitcom Sledge Hammer!. Since then he has often played characters in positions of authority, in both serious and comical turns. In television he is known for his main role as Karl Muller in the HBO drama series Succession and his role as Alden Schmidt in the TV Land comedy series Impastor, as well as recurring and guest performances in numerous programs including L.A. Law, Monk, The West Wing, Veep, Bored to Death, and Ugly Betty.

== Early life ==
Rasche was born in St. Louis, Missouri. His father was a minister and farmer.

Rasche graduated from Elmhurst College in 1966; his grandfather was also an alumnus. Coming from "a long line of Evangelical and United Church of Christ ministers", he attended the University of Chicago Divinity School for two years, then quit. He did, however, receive a graduate degree in English from the University of Chicago.

Rasche studied acting under Sanford Meisner.

== Career ==
=== Early years ===
Rasche worked as a writer and teacher, including teaching English for two years at Gustavus Adolphus College in Minnesota. He performed for two years in Chicago's Second City improvisation group after studying there, and he also helped fund Victory Gardens Theater in Chicago.

After Second City, Rasche starred in Organic Theater's 1974 production of David Mamet's Sexual Perversity in Chicago, which established the playwright's characteristic blend of earthy, sometimes brutal dialogue.

Rasche began appearing on television and films in 1977, making his film debut in 1978 in An Unmarried Woman, directed by Paul Mazursky. The following year, he had a small part in Woody Allen's Manhattan.

Rasche played a terrorist in the 1983 television film Special Bulletin. He appeared on the Miami Vice episode "Bushido" (first aired November 22, 1985) as a KGB agent attempting to capture a former colleague of Lt. Castillo (Edward James Olmos). During his subsequent starring role on Sledge Hammer! his character often made jokes about Miami Vice.

Rasche played Petruchio to Frances Conroy's Kate in a production of Shakespeare's The Taming of the Shrew directed by Zoe Caldwell at the American Shakespeare Theatre in Stratford, Connecticut, in the mid-1980s.

=== Sledge Hammer! ===
Rasche is best known for his portrayal of the title character in the satirical television sitcom Sledge Hammer!, which ran from 1986 to 1988. The show was a spoof of police dramas and concerned the character Sledge Hammer, a violent and chauvinistic – but also somewhat clumsy – police inspector with a taste for large and powerful weaponry.

=== Later work ===
Rasche had a minor role as a photographer in the movie Cobra alongside Brigitte Nielsen.

Shortly after Sledge Hammer! ended, he played to critical acclaim in the Broadway production of Mamet's Speed-the-Plow, and he later appeared in an Off-Broadway revival of Mamet's Edmond.

Rasche was lead character Buddy Wheeler in the 1990 biker comedy Masters of Menace. He played Parnell, one of two corrupt narcotics police officers, in the 1989 Tom Selleck crime drama, An Innocent Man.

Rasche played the role of Ted Forstmann in the 1993 made-for-television movie Barbarians at the Gate, about the leveraged buyout (LBO) of RJR Nabisco. Rasche had a leading role in the 1997 Columbo episode, "A Trace of Murder".

In addition to his work as a screen actor, Rasche can also be heard as Captain Piett in the NPR radio adaptation of The Empire Strikes Back.

Rasche portrayed Donald Greene, one of the passengers of United Airlines Flight 93, in Paul Greengrass's 2006 9/11 film United 93. He had a major role in the 2009 satirical political comedy In the Loop, as a US official pushing for an invasion of an unspecified Middle Eastern country.

Starting February 14, 2017, he played George Antrobus in Theatre for a New Audience's production of Thornton Wilder's The Skin of Our Teeth, opposite Kecia Lewis as Maggie Antrobus. Rasche had a main role in HBO's Succession as Karl Muller from 2018 to 2023. He also participated in an industry reading of Rob Sedgwick's play, Please Leave, on February 13, 2023.

== Personal life ==
Rasche met his future wife Heather Lupton after he moved to New York City in 1976. She has taught acting at the University of California, Santa Barbara. They have three children. Rasche owns a house in Santa Barbara, California.

== Theatre productions ==
Year	Title	Role	Venue
1977	Isadora Duncan Sleeps with the Russian Navy	Ivan Miroski / German Entrepreneur/ Lenin	American Place Theatre, Off-Broadway
1977	The Shadow Box	Mark	Morosco Theatre, Broadway
1979	Loose Ends	Ben	Circle in the Square Theatre, Broadway
1980	Lunch Hour	Peter	Ethel Barrymore Theatre, Broadway
1982	Geniuses	Eugene Winter	Playwrights Horizons, Off-Broadway
1984	To Gillian on Her 37th Birthday	David	Circle in the Square Downtown, Off-Broadway
1985	The Custom of the Country	Raymond De Chelles	McGinn/Cazale Theatre, Off-Broadway (Note: Second Stage Theater is a theatre company that stages Off-Broadway productions at the McGinn/Cazale Theatre and at the Tony Kiser Theater, and Broadway theatre productions at the Hayes Theatre since 2015. Thus, Second Stage is not associated with the 1998 Broadway production Rasche appeared in at the then-named Helen Hayes Theatre.)
1988	Speed-the-Plow	Bobby Gould	Royale Theatre, Broadway
1990	The Country Girl	Frank Elgin	Union Square Theatre, Off-Broadway
1996	Edmond	Edmond	Linda Gross Theater, Off-Broadway
1998	Getting and Spending	Richard O'Neill	Helen Hayes Theatre, Broadway
2003	Last Dance	Randall	New York City Center, Off-Broadway (Note: Manhattan Theatre Club is a theatre company that stages Off-Broadway productions at the New York City Center, and Broadway theatre productions at the Samuel J. Friedman Theatre)
2004	Five by Tenn	Josie Cartwright / Lawrence / Two	New York City Center, Off-Broadway
2005	Moonlight and Magnolias	Victor Fleming	New York City Center, Off-Broadway
2006	Lovely Day	Performer	Samuel Beckett Theatre, New York
2006	Elvis and Juliet	Joey Francis Lesley	June Havoc Theatre, New York
2006–07	Regrets Only	Jack McCullough	New York City Center, Off-Broadway
2008	The Seagull	Yevgeny Sergeyevich Dorn	Classic Stage Company, Off-Broadway
2008	To Be or Not to Be	Josef Tura	Samuel J. Friedman Theatre, Broadway
2012	Warrior Class	Nathan	McGinn/Cazale Theatre, Off-Broadway
2013	Little Miss Sunshine	Grandpa Hoover	Tony Kiser Theatre, Off-Broadway
2014	The Country House	Walter Keegan	Samuel J. Friedman Theatre, Broadway
2017	The Skin of Our Teeth	Mr. Antroubus	Polonsky Shakespeare Center, Brooklyn
2024	Cult of Love	William "Bill" Dahl	Helen Hayes Theatre, Broadway

== Filmography ==
=== Film ===
Year	Title	Role	Notes
1978	An Unmarried Woman	Man at Bar	Uncredited
1979	Manhattan	Television Actor #3	
1979	Something Short of Paradise	David Ritchie	
1980	Just Tell Me What You Want	Stopwatch Producer	
1981	Honky Tonk Freeway	Eddie White	
1982	Fighting Back	Michael Taylor	
1984	Best Defense	KGB Agent Jeff	
1986	Cobra	Dan	
1986	Native Son	Buckley	
1987	Made in Heaven	Donald Sumner	
1989	Wicked Stepmother	Steve Fisher	
1989	An Innocent Man	Detective Mike Parnell	
1989	Wedding Band	Sloane Vaughn	
1990	Masters of Menace	Buddy Wheeler	
1991	Delirious	Dr. Paul Kirkwood / Dennis	
1991	Bingo	Hal Devlin	
1993	Twenty Bucks	Baker	
1994	A Million to Juan	Jeff	
1994	Bigfoot: The Unforgettable Encounter	Chaz Frederick	
1995	Magic in the Water	Phillip	
1995	Pie in the Sky	Amy's Dad	
1997	That Old Feeling	Alan	
1999	Friends & Lovers	Richie Wickham	
1999	The Settlement	Denny	
1999	The Big Tease	Stig Ludwigssen	
1999	Pros & Cons	Jack Stanford	
2001	Teddy Bears' Picnic	Elliot Chevron	
2002	Divine Secrets of the Ya-Ya Sisterhood	Taylor Abbott	
2003	Just Married	Mr. McNerney	
2003	Exposed	Warren Ward	
2004	Off the Lip	Dr. Martin Shutte	
2005	The L.A. Riot Spectacular	Performer	
2005	Perception	Phil	
2006	The Sentinel	President John Ballentine	
2006	United 93	Donald Freeman Greene	
2006	Flags of Our Fathers	Senator	
2007	The Girl in the Park	Doug	
2008	Burn After Reading	CIA Officer Palmer DeBakey Smith	
2009	Peter and Vandy	Alan	
2009	In the Loop	Linton Barwick	
2009	Crimes of the Past	Thomas Sparrow	
2009	Blue Eyes	Marshall	
2011	Collaborator	Radio Host (voice)	
2011	Remembrance	Daniel Levine	
2012	Missed Connections	George	
2012	Revenge for Jolly!	Eichelberger	
2012	Men in Black 3	Agent X	
2012	Petunia	Percy Petunia	
2012	The Discoverers	Cyrus Marshall	
2012	The Strange Case of Wilhelm Reich	Hills	
2013	Kill Your Darlings	Harry Carman	
2013	The Big Wedding	Barry O'Connor	
2014	Amira & Sam	Jack	
2014	Freedom	Jefferson Monroe	
2019	Swallow	Michael	
2020	Paper Spiders	Bill Hoffman	
2021	Americanish	Jim	
2021	The Good House	Scott Good	
2023	Theater Camp	Dr. Bill Rauch	
2023	About My Father	Bill Collins	
2026	Evil Genius		

=== Television ===
Year	Title	Role	Notes
1977	The Andros Targets	Smitty	Episode: "Death in a Toy Balloon"
1978	On Our Town	Performer	Episode: "A Friend, Indeed"
1978–1981	Ryan's Hope	Wes Leonard	34 episodes
1979	Sanctuary of Fear	Jack Collins	Television movie
1979	Mrs. Columbo	William Gardner	Episode: "Falling Star"
1981–1982	Love, Sidney	J.M.	2 episodes
1982	SCTV Network	Robert Wellesly	Episode: "Melonvote"
1983	Special Bulletin	Dr. David McKeeson	Television movie
1984	The Lost Honor of Kathryn Beck	Donald Catton	Television movie
1984	Search for Tomorrow	Colonel Tom Burns	3 episodes
1985	Sara	David Collier	Episode: "David Returns"
1985	Code Name: Foxfire	Sam Rawlings	Episode: "Slay it Again, Sam"
1985	Miami Vice	Surf	Episode: "Bushido"
1986	Kate & Allie	Richard Lubin	Episode: "Thank You, Shirley"
1986–1988	Sledge Hammer!	Sledge Hammer	41 episodes
1988	Secret Witness	Sandy	Television movie
1990	Silhouette	Sheriff Kyle Lauder	Television movie
1991	The Trials of Rosie O'Neill	Patrick	Episode: "Wolf Pack"
1992	L.A. Law	David McCoy	2 episodes
1992–1994	Nurses	Jack Trenton	46 episodes
1993	Empty Nest	Jack Trenton	Episode: "Love and Marriage"
1993	Barbarians at the Gate	Ted Forstmann	Television movie
1994	Burke's Law	John Ramsey	Episode: "Who Killed the Legal Eagle?"
1994	Hart to Hart: Old Friends Never Die	Alfred Raine	Television movie
1995	Aaahh!!! Real Monsters	Friggit (voice)	Episode: "Where Have All the Monsters Gone?"
1995	Signs and Wonders	Brother Nahum	4 episodes
1995	Duckman	Baron Von Dillweed	Episode: "Married Alive"
1995	Perry Mason	Ben Landry	Episode: "The Case of the Jealous Jokester"
1995	Dead Weekend	Payne	Television movie
1995	Out There	Don Polson	Television movie
1995–1996	High Society	Peter Thomas	10 episodes
1997	Columbo	Patrick Kinsley	Episode: "A Trace of Murder"
1998	The Wonderful World of Disney	Derek Early	Episode: "Tourist Trap"
1998	Recess	Mr. E (voice)	Episode: "The Substitute"
1998	Just Shoot Me!	Michael Tenzer	Episode: "War and Sleaze"
1999	Grown Ups	Kenny Daniels	Episode: "Family Circus"
1999	The West Wing	Carl	Episode: "The State Dinner"
2000	Suddenly Susan	Evan	2 episodes
2000–2001	DAG	President Whitman	5 episodes
2001	The Lot	Eddie Moran	Episode: "The Mob Scene"
2001	For Your Love	Dr. Bruckner	Episode: "The Birth Day"
2002	MDs	Mr. Baranski	Episode: "Reversal of Fortune"
2002	Providence	Doc Croc	Episode: "The Wedding Planner"
2002	What Leonard Comes Home To	Performer	Television movie
2003	Malcolm in the Middle	The Lawyer	Episode: "Grandma Sues"
2003	Monk	Coach Patterson	Episode: "Mr. Monk Goes Back to School"
2003	She Spies	Norton Andrews	Episode: "While You Were Out"
2003	Robbery Homicide Division	Lee	Episode: "Hellbound Train"
2004	Las Vegas	Tim Valentine	Episode: "Die Fast, Die Furious"
2006	The Book of Daniel	Donald Warwick	Episode: "Acceptance"
2008	All My Children	Robert Gardner	38 episodes
2009	Law & Order	Joe Delaney	Episode: "Anchors Aweigh"
2009	Sherri	Bart	3 episodes
2009	Can Openers	Dr. Steven Miller	Television movie
2009–2010	Ugly Betty	Cal Hartley	10 episodes
2010	The Electric Company	The Ronald	Episode: "The Junior Assistant"
2010	Rubicon	James Wheeler	7 episodes
2011	Are We There Yet?	"Thunder" Clark	Episode: "She Got Game"
2011	Royal Pains	Charles Woodward	Episode: "Rash Talk"
2011	Bored to Death	Bernard	6 episodes
2013–2017	Veep	Jim Marwood	8 episodes
2014	Black Box	Hunter Black	2 episodes
2015–2016	Impastor	Alden Schmidt	20 episodes
2016	Understudies	Clement Shaw	Episode: "Table Manners"
2016	Madam Secretary	Ambassador Arlen Maxwell	Episode: "The Middle Way"
2018–2023	Succession	Karl Muller	28 episodes
2022	Inside Amy Schumer	CEO	Episode: "Quiet Pills"
2025	Dying for Sex	Dr. Pankowitz	miniseries
2025	Elsbeth	Monsignor Frank	Episode: "And Then There Were Nuns"
2026	The Hunting Party	Dr. Sidney Fairfax	Episode: "Sidney Fairfax"

== Awards and nominations ==
Year	Association	Category	Project	Result	Ref.
2022	Screen Actors Guild Awards	Outstanding Performance by an Ensemble in a Drama Series	Succession	Won	
2024	Screen Actors Guild Awards	Outstanding Performance by an Ensemble in a Drama Series	Succession	Won	
