= Hasmonean Brigade =

Ultra-Orthodox Israeli military unit

- חטיבת חשמונאים
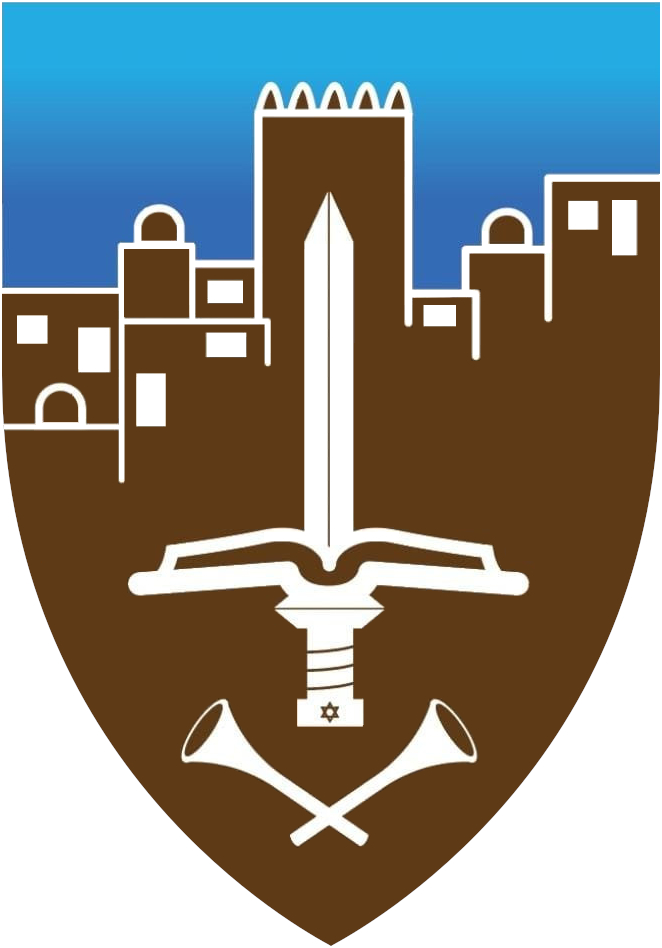
- Active: 2024 - Present
- Country: Israel
- Branch: Israeli Ground Forces
- Role: Haredi infantry brigade
- Size: Potentially up to 4,000
- Nickname: The Haredi Brigade
- Engagements: Gaza war, 2026 Iran war

Commanders
- Current commander: Colonel Avinoam Emunah

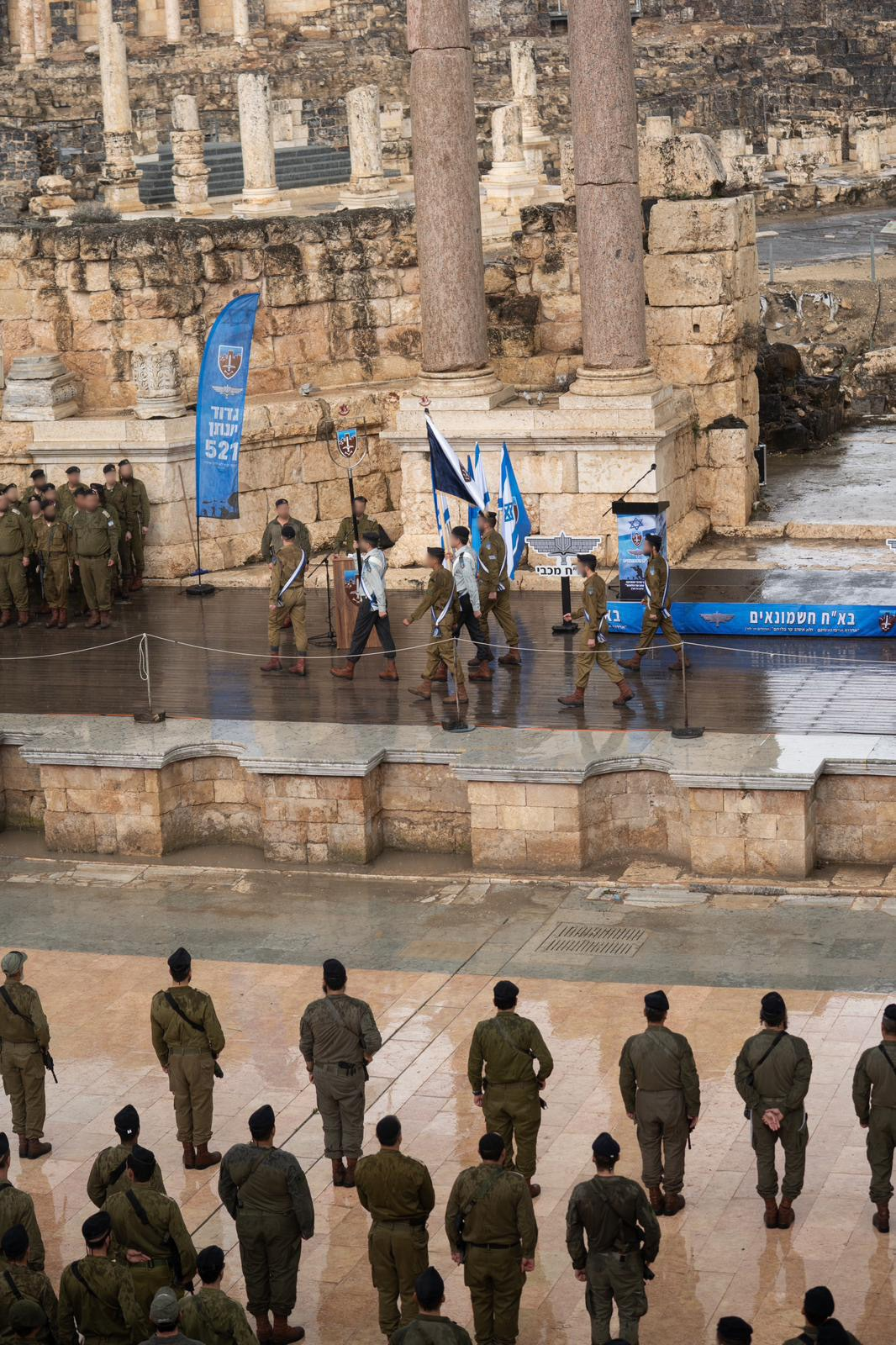
Hasmonean Brigade change of command ceremony, 2026

The Hasmonean Brigade (Hebrew: חטיבת החשמונאים) is an infantry unit in the Israel Defense Forces under the Education and Training Command. The brigade was founded to accommodate Haredi soldiers, who were previously exempt from conscription in Israel.

== History ==
The brigade is currently being arranged and commanded by Colonel Avinoam Emunah and will potentially have up to 4,000 soldiers.

The Israeli Ministry of Defense says the unit is intended for single or married soldiers who wish to maintain their Haredi lifestyle and combine their religious studies with military service.

Enlistees undergo 8 months of training to join the brigade, which includes rifleman, stealth, open terrain warfare, and night operations training. They are also required to sign a document stating that they will follow a halakhic lifestyle, which includes maintaining a beard and peyos, refraining from the use of foul language, and dressing in accordance with Jewish law.

The unit began operations in Lebanon as part of the 2026 Iran war in mid-March 2026.

As of 5 January 2025, the first 50 Haredim had successfully enlisted in the brigade.

Since early 2026, more than 300 soldiers have joined the brigade.

=== Brigade organization ===
- 613th Infantry Brigade "Hasmonean"
  - 521st Infantry Battalion "Jonathan"
  - 613th Infantry Battalion "Maccabim"
  - 1200th Infantry Battalion "Shimon" (Reserve)
  - Logistic Battalion (being formed)
  - Signal Company

== See also ==
- Netzah Yehuda Battalion
- Haredi Military Administration
- Shlav Bet
- Haredim and Zionism
- Conscription in Israel
- Religious Zionism
- Hardal
- David Leibel
