= Spaceballs: The Animated Series =

Television series

- Genre: Adult animation; Comic science fiction; Satire
- Created by: Mel Brooks; Thomas Meehan
- Based on: Spaceballs by: Mel Brooks; Thomas Meehan; Ronny Graham
- Voices of: Mel Brooks; Daphne Zuniga; Joan Rivers; Tino Insana; Rino Romano; Dee Bradley Baker
- Theme music composer: Mel Brooks
- Opening theme: "Spaceballs theme song"
- Ending theme: "Spaceballs theme song" (instrumental)
- Countries of origin: United States; Canada; Germany
- Original language: English
- No. of seasons: 1
- No. of episodes: 13

Production
- Executive producers: Mel Brooks; Rainer Soehnlein
- Producer: Chad Hammes
- Running time: 30 minutes (including commercials)
- Production companies: Berliner Film Companie; Brooksfilms; Fantasy Prone Interactive; MGM Television; G4 Media

Original release
- Network: Super Channel (Canada); G4 (United States)
- Release: June 4, 2008 – March 1, 2009

Spaceballs: The Animated Series, also known as Mel Brooks' Spaceballs: The Animated Series or simply Spaceballs: The Series, is an adult animated television series that premiered in 2008 on the United States' G4 and Canada's Super Channel. Created by Mel Brooks and Thomas Meehan, the series is loosely based on the parody science fiction film Spaceballs. Similarly to how the original film parodied the original Star Wars films and the Star Trek universe, each episode of the series parodies a different film or other aspect of popular culture, such as the Star Wars prequel trilogy, The Lord of the Rings, Jurassic Park, or the Grand Theft Auto video games. The show was widely panned and was not renewed for a second season.

== Production ==
Production began in early 2005 under the supervision of Brooksfilms, MGM, and Berliner Film Companie. Mel Brooks not only directed the writing, but also reprised his roles as President Skroob and Yogurt from the film.

Daphne Zuniga and Joan Rivers also reprise their roles from the film, while Bill Pullman, Rick Moranis, and George Wyner do not. Those roles are filled by Rino Romano, Dee Bradley Baker, and Dave Wittenberg, respectively. Tino Insana replaces John Candy, who died in 1994, as "Barf," and Rudy De Luca also supplied his voice talents while Dom DeLuise reprises his role of Pizza the Hutt.

=== Delayed series premiere ===
Some promotional items on the series were seen at the 2007 Comic-Con and a total of 13 episodes were planned to debut during the fall of 2007, although this "deadline" passed by with no sign of the show on G4's schedule. A start date of June 1, 2008 was later reported, but the series was delayed once again. Despite the lack of information in the United States, the series premiered on Canada's Super Channel, and remained absent from G4 in America until its eventual series premiere on September 21, 2008. The first two episodes of the series were shown following an airing of the original film.

== Voice cast ==
- Mel Brooks as President Skroob, Yogurt
- Daphne Zuniga as Princess Vespa
- Joan Rivers as Dot Matrix
- Tino Insana as Barf (replacing John Candy due to his death)
- Rino Romano as Lone Starr (replacing Bill Pullman)
- Dee Bradley Baker as Dark Helmet/Pannakin Crybaby (replacing Rick Moranis)
- Rudy De Luca as Vinnie, Fort Lox Checkpoint official
- Dom DeLuise as Pizza the Hutt
- Julianne Grossman as Commanderette Zircon (replacing Leslie Bevis), Charlene, Marlene (replacing Denise and Dian Gallup), Darlene, Yente, The Unsinkable Old Fat Lady, Princess Harley Van Patten (a parody of Padmé Amidala), Pannakin's mother (a parody of Shmi Skywalker), Robohooker, Jasmine, Telephone Operator
- Dave Wittenberg as Colonel Sandurz (replacing George Wyner)
- Jim Jackman
- Jim Meskimen

== Episodes ==
| No. | Title | Directed by | Written by | Original release date |
|---|---|---|---|---|
| 0 | "Pilot" | Unknown | Mel Brooks and Thomas Meehan | June 4, 2008 |
A retelling of the movie with some key differences to set up the series. The primary changes are that Lone Starr retains the ring of the Schwartz and he does not turn out to be a prince. Thus, Vespa instead decides to stay single since she cannot marry him. Note: This marked the final acting performance of Dom DeLuise before his death in May 2009.
| 1 | "Revenge of the Sithee" | Jay Surridge | David Lewman & Joe Liss | November 21, 2008 |
Dark Helmet gets knocked out by a robot stripper in President Skroob's new casino and recalls his origin story as in a dream. Once he was a young boy named Pannakin Crybaby, he won his freedom in a NasPodrace, was trained in the Schwartz by Yogurt, fell in love with Princess Harley Van Patten, and became Lord Dark Helmet. Parody: Star Wars prequel trilogy
| 2 | "Grand Theft Starship" | Blake Leibel | Ian Dallas | November 28, 2008 |
Lone Starr and Princess Vespa are sucked into a game of Grand Theft Starship, leaving the Spaceballs to conquer the known universe. But missing Lone Starr's opposition, President Skroob and Dark Helmet follow them into the game world. Parody: Grand Theft Auto and various other video game series
| 3 | "Lord of the Onion Rings" | David Dulac | Boomie Aglietti | December 5, 2008 |
Years ago, Lone Starr's father stole the One Onion ring from President Skroob's father. When Barf finds the Onion Ring stuck in an old couch inside the Eagle 5, Yogurt sends him on a quest to throw the Onion Ring into the deep fryer of Lardor. Meanwhile, President Skroob orders Dark Helmet to build him a dark army. Unfortunately, they end up with a dork army instead. Parody: The Lord of the Rings
| 4 | "Watch Your Assic Park" | Chad Hammes | Adam Kosloff | December 12, 2008 |
Lone Starr and Barf are named fans of the day at a Spankees ball game and win a trip to Watch your Assic Park to see the Spankees train. After they arrive at Isla Nueblo (180 star miles from Planet Costa Rica), they learn how President Skroob (who is the owner of the Spankees) uses a combination of steroids and dinosaur DNA to create Dino-athletes and rule the sports universe. Despite being quite disgusted, Lone Starr, Barf, Vespa, and Dot take the park tour anyway, accompanied by President Skroob's precious 9 year old niece Jasmine and two anonymous lawyers. Parody: Jurassic Park
| 5 | "Outbreak" | Jay Surridge & Chad Hammes | Boomie Aglietti | December 19, 2008 |
President Skroob hatches a plan to take over the galaxy with a pestilent soda. But Barf intercepts the shipment and causes an outbreak on planet Spaceball. Parodies: Outbreak and Quarantine
| 6 | "Hairy Putter and the Gopher of Fire" | Chad Hammes | Julie Chambers & David Chambers | December 26, 2008 |
Lone Starr and the gang go to a golf tournament at Mawgwarts academy. But President Skroob uses Dark Helmet to cheat using a magic diaper. Parody: Harry Potter and the Goblet of Fire
| 7 | "The Mighty Meteor" | Chad Hammes | Adam Kosloff | January 3, 2009 |
President Skroob and Dark Helmet attempt to destroy planet Druidia with a meteor, but it fails. With the help from Indians, they launch a mighty meteor. Meanwhile, Lone Starr becomes obsessed with his new van. Parody: Armageddon
| 8 | "Spaceballs of the Caribbean" | David Dulac | David Lewman & Joe Liss | January 24, 2009 |
President Skroob fools Yogurt with a "free body scan" to steal his gallbladder which is the source of all the Schwartz. Now Lone Starr and "Black Barf" must get it back. But Dark Helmet wants all the Schwartz in the galaxy. Parody: Pirates of the Caribbean
| 9 | "Fishfinger" | David Dulac | Juile Chambers & David Chambers | February 1, 2009 |
President Skroob in his Fishfinger alias has a plan to take over the galaxy's fish supply. Lone Starr AKA Double O "Sven" must stop Fishfinger. Parody: Goldfinger
| 10 | "The Skroobinator" | Jason Raines & Michael Montaine | Joe Meehan | February 8, 2009 |
President Skroob is way behind in the re-election polls, so he and Dark Helmet go back in time to kill the great-great-etc.-grandmother of his opponent. Parody: The Terminator
| 11 | "Deep Ship" | David Dulac & Chad Hammes | Juile Chambers & David Chambers | February 15, 2009 |
President Skroob kidnaps Princess Vespa and tries to use her as a virgin sacrifice on planet Areola. Parody: The Poseidon Adventure and Titanic
| 12 | "Druidian Idol" | Rainer Soehnlein | Boomie Aglietti | February 22, 2009 |
Barf and Princess Vespa appear on the show "Druidian Idol". Lone Star, Dot, and President Skroob pose as judges. On Lone Starr's part, he took up the job when Vinnie demanded that he and Barf pay him protection money. Parody: American Idol
| 13 | "Spidermawg" | Blake Leibel, Michael Montaine, & Jason Raines | Joe Meehan | March 1, 2009 |
Barf gets bitten by a mutant space spider and becomes Spidermawg. Parody: Spider-Man
