= Bobby's World =

American animated television series (1990–1998)

- Genre: Comedy; Fantasy; Children's television series
- Created by: Howie Mandel
- Developed by: Jim Staahl; Jim Fisher
- Written by: Howie Mandel (live action writer)
- Starring: Howie Mandel as himself and as the voice of Bobby Generic and Howard Generic
- Voices of: Gail Matthius; Susan Tolsky; Tino Insana; Edie McClurg; Charity James; Benny Grant; Kevin Smets; Pamela Adlon; Frank Welker
- Theme music composer: John Tesh
- Composers: John Tesh (1990–1993, seasons 1–3); Mark Koval (1993–1998, seasons 4–7)
- Country of origin: United States
- No. of seasons: 7
- No. of episodes: 81 (list of episodes)

Production
- Executive producers: Phil Roman; Howie Mandel (1991–1998, seasons 2–7)
- Producers: Mitch Schauer (1990–1991, seasons 1–2); Gary Conrad (1991–1998, seasons 3–7)
- Production companies: Film Roman; Alevy Productions; Fox Children's Productions

Original release
- Network: Fox Kids
- Release: September 8, 1990 – February 23, 1998

Bobby's World (originally known as The World According to Bobby) is an American animated comedy children's television series that aired on Fox Kids from September 8, 1990, to February 23, 1998. The show was created by Canadian actor/comedian Howie Mandel, who also performs the voices of both Bobby and his father Howard Generic.

It was produced by Film Roman in association with Mandel's company Alevy Productions and Fox Children's Productions. The theme song for Bobby's World was composed by John Tesh and Michael Hanna.

== Premise ==
The series follows the daily life of a four-year-old Bobby Generic (/ˈdʒɛnərɪk/ JEN-ər-ik), with his very overactive imagination and how he sees the world.

== Characters ==
=== Main ===
- Robert Adelvice "Bobby" Generic (voiced by Howie Mandel) – The main character of the series. He is a four-year-old boy (five in seasons 2 through 6, then six in season 7) who likes to fantasize. An imaginative Bobby claims however that he came from his dreams. Scenes with Bobby most often involve elaborate literal interpretations of the popular or colloquial sayings uttered by other characters during the show (i.e. a "traffic jam" becomes Traffic Jam, as Bobby imagines spreading tiny vehicles (cars and trucks) on a piece of bread and taking a bite). When he enters contests, he tends to end up losing because Bobby ends up being himself rather than using his common sense. Bobby has short, spiky black hair. He wears a white shirt with red short sleeves (which also reveals his innie and tummy exposed), red shorts and blue sneakers.

=== Family members ===
The Generic family's surname is pronounced "JEN-uh-rik", but mispronounced as "juh-NEHR-ik" by other characters as a running gag.

- Howard Generic (modeled upon and also voiced by Howie Mandel using his normal voice) – Bobby's father. Using his strict temper, he usually punishes his son Bobby by sending him to his room for his misbehaving and also does similar things to his other children when they do something he does not approve of. Howard works at a trouser manufacturing company.
- Martha Sven-Generic (voiced by Gail Matthius) – Bobby's mother who has red hair and is often seen wearing a sky-blue tracksuit. She has a prominent Midwestern accent, and often peppered her speech with phrases such as "Fer corn sakes", "Fer cryin' in the mud", "gee golly", "gosh darn" and "dont'cha know". Martha would often scold the children when Howard is either busy or unavailable. Gail Matthius based Martha on her Saturday Night Live character, Roweena, a chain-smoking hairdresser.
- Kelly Generic (voiced by Charity James) – Bobby's 15-year-old tomboyish rebellious sister, the eldest Generic sibling, donning a blonde shag haircut, colored makeup, pink-striped tights, and a valley girl accent and manner, and often uses her catchphrase "Get real!"
- Derek Generic (voiced by Benny Grant in Seasons 1-2, Kevin Smets in Seasons 3-6, then Pamela Adlon in Season 7) – Bobby's 10-year-old brother, who is a bully with a rat-tail hairdo, ripped blue jeans, and a sarcastic manner. He always teases and insults his younger brother and tends to call him a "dork" or a "dweeb". Bobby has a bad habit of listening to him and Derek is often reprimanded by his parents for fooling his middle-child brother.
- Jake and Alex Generic – Bobby's younger twin brothers who were introduced in Season 3, but mentioned in Season 2 as Martha was pregnant with them.
- Ted Sven (voiced by Tino Insana) – Bobby's uncle and Martha and Ruth's brother. He is a blond, portly, stout gentleman with a deep rough voice and his signature outfit is a yellow shirt printed with red hearts. Uncle Ted is a fun-loving fellow who loves to joke around with Bobby and is a collector of several things, one of which is a novelty item called Socks in a Can. His last name is revealed to be Sven. He is unpartnered and his attempts to find a sweetheart end in disaster. He is also affectionate toward his youngest nephew and often calls him by the nickname "Bobbo." Bobby likes hanging out with Uncle Ted because he thinks of all kinds of fun stuff to do including giving Bobby noogies.
- Ruth Sven (voiced by Susan Tolsky) – Bobby's aunt and Martha's sister, She is a blonde, amply-contoured lady with a sweet, pretty face and her hair tied in a bun, and kindly ways. She is loving and affectionate toward her younger nephew and particularly likes to pinch his cheeks, which Bobby really doesn't go for. Like her brother Ted, she is unpartnered. Unlike Ted, Ruth makes no attempt to seek a sweetheart. Part of her signature outfit is knee-high stockings rolled into a ring at the cuffs.
- Roger (vocal effects provided by Frank Welker) – The Generics' pet Old English Sheepdog.
- Webbly (vocal effects provided by Frank Welker) – Bobby's stuffed toy spider who make sounds in his imaginations.
- Teddy - Bobby's stuffed teddy bear who speaks to him in his imaginations.

=== Recurring ===
- Howie Mandel (portrayed by himself) – The show's creator in live-action who interacts with Bobby in the hybrid opening and ending scenes. In the first-season episodes, the live-action Howie is Howard Generic and has the ability to change into his animated alter-ego. Starting with season 2 and continuing until the end of the series, Howie and Howard Generic are two separate individuals.
- George (voiced by Pauly Shore) – The boyfriend of Kelly.
- Tiffany (voiced by Candi Milo) – One of Kelly's friends. She wears a hat.
- Amber (voiced by Candi Milo) – One of Kelly's friends.
- Andrea (voiced by Candi Milo) – Another one of Kelly's friends.
- Jackie Bodine (voiced by Debi Derryberry) – Bobby's best friend and neighbor with floor-length ginger pigtails who has a crush on Bobby. She always kisses him (which he dislikes, having to constantly wipe her kisses off). Jackie speaks with a monotone voice.
- Charlotte (voiced by unknown) – Rambunctious and sassy, Charlotte is the fun-loving, adventurous girl who is best known for her dislike of chocolate (due to being unhealthy) and her tendency to tease Bobby incessantly over minor things he does.
- Mrs. Orso (voiced by Susan Tolsky) – Bobby and Jackie's teacher at Little Red Preschool.
- Meeker (voiced by Pat Fraley) and Snurd (voiced by Jeff Doucette in 1990 to 1991, Rob Paulsen in 1991 to 1998) – A bumbling duo seen doing many different jobs around town, whether it be police officers, mall security guards, paramedics, stage hands, pee-wee sports coaches, hospital staff members, and airport security personnel. Meeker is a skinny guy and Snerd is a large African-American fat guy.
- Captain Squash (voiced by Gary Owens) – Captain Squash is Bobby's favorite superhero. He often appears to help Bobby in his imaginations.

== Episodes ==
Season	Episodes	Originally released	
Season	Episodes	First released	Last released
1	13	September 8, 1990	January 19, 1991
2	8	September 7, 1991	November 16, 1991
3	13	August 29, 1992	May 8, 1993
4	13	September 18, 1993	February 26, 1994
5	13	September 12, 1994	February 20, 1995
6	11	September 11, 1995	November 4, 1996
7	10	September 6, 1997	February 23, 1998

== Production ==
=== Development ===
Howie Mandel stated that he accidentally created the voice that would be later used to voice Bobby when he was choking on a piece of cake. Two of Mandel's friends, Jim Fisher and Jim Staahl, signed an agreement with the Fox Broadcasting Company's then newly-created children's division in 1989. Fisher and Staahl asked Mandel to join them in creating a show based on Mandel's Bobby character and voice. Mandel stated that he believed Fox did not think his stand-up routines were "family entertainment". He, Fisher, and Staahl (co-producers) recalled stories from their childhoods as they discussed the formation of the show. Mandel said "that was the seed of Bobby's World". Later stories from the childhoods of writers Dianne and Peter Tilden along with Mitch Schauer were used as the basis of many of the stories. The other characters on the show were mixes of characteristics of the creators' parents' friends and relatives. Specifically, Uncle Ted was based on Fisher and Staahl's former comedy partner in a comedy trio formed by the three after leaving Chicago's Second City, called The Graduates. Ultimately, that partner Tino Insana read for and won the part of Uncle Ted.

Future Nickelodeon staff member Mitch Schauer drew the designs for the main characters. Bobby's character design was based on Schauer's then-4-year-old son.

On February 12, 2007, the character Bobby made a surprise appearance on an episode of Deal or No Deal.

=== Show format ===
Episodes often consist of a short live-action segment either before or after the main story (and sometimes both before and after). The segment would include Mandel describing some aspect of the story and often relating it back to his personal childhood. Sometimes during these segments, the character of Bobby would appear in animated form and converse with Mandel. Other times, a live action child would appear and exchange words with Mandel. Endings of the show also featured Mandel breaking the "fourth wall" by talking to viewers about the preceding episode. In some part of the episode, Bobby will break the fourth wall by telling the audience his perspective on life.

=== Music ===
The series' music composed by Mark Koval. The theme music also composed by John Tesh and Michael Hanna.

=== Possible reboot ===
In an April 2006 online interview, Mandel expressed his desire for a possible reboot of the series.

In November 2014, it was announced that Mandel told a crowd at Comikaze that plans to revive the series were in motion.

In May 2018, Mandel again made reference to his efforts to get the series revived in an interview with Entertainment Weekly's Dave Quinn.

== Broadcast ==
During its original run, Bobby's World was seen on Fox Kids. After it was cancelled in 1998, reruns began airing on Fox Family until 2001.

The series used to be available in its entirety on Netflix and Kabillion as well. It used to be available on Amazon Prime Video until it got removed in 2025. Episodes can occasionally be seen in syndication, on a variety of websites, on Netflix or on Comcast's On-Demand service.

In the United States, starting in 1996, the show was open-captioned; this was intended as an aid to help younger children learn to read.

In Brazil, it was aired on SBT, being known as one of the most well known cartoons in the 1990s.

In Canada, it aired on Global Television Network, TVO, YTV and later, Teletoon Retro.

In Russia, it aired on REN-TV, TV-3 and Jetix Play.

In Kazakhstan, it aired on Raisovka Television.

In Europe and Latin America, it aired on Fox Kids (then Jetix, later Disney XD)

== Home media ==
From 1994 to 1998, 20th Century Fox Home Entertainment released VHS titles of the series.

- Volume 1 – Uncle Ted's Excellent Adventure / The Visit To Aunt Ruth's
- Volume 2 – Bobby's Big Move / Bobby's Big Broadcast
- Volume 3 – Swim By Me / Jets, Choo Choos & Cars
- Fish Tales / Generics Under Construction
- Me & Roger

In 2004, Anchor Bay Entertainment released two best-of compilations, Classic Scratch 'n' Sniff Episodes and The Signature Episodes, on DVD in Region 1.

On December 15, 2011, it was announced that MoonScoop Group had acquired the distribution rights to the series and planned to release all seven seasons of Bobby's World on DVD in early 2012 All seasons were made available for purchase on March 13, 2012.

== Video game ==
A video game adaptation of Bobby's World for the Super Nintendo Entertainment System and Sega Genesis was scheduled for release in 1994, but ultimately never did so. It was developed by Riedel Software Productions and set to be published by Hi Tech Entertainment. A prototype ROM image of the Super NES version was unofficially released by a Warez scene group in October 1994.

In the game, Bobby's mother tells him to clean his room. As he is cleaning his room, Bobby starts daydreaming about a toy. After beating a level, Bobby has another daydream about another toy that he puts away.

Bobby's World is a platform game. In some stages, the gameplay changes to something similar to a shoot 'em up. The player is asked to control Bobby and make him jump, squat, walk, run, and throw objects at the enemies – the objects often change according to the level's thematic – and use Webbly to defend Bobby. On some stages, Webbly can be used to do other things too, like reach higher platforms, throw it at their enemies or even using it as a mount.

A Game Boy game based on the series was also planned, developed by Unexpected Development and published by Hi Tech Entertainment. The game was originally based on Home Alone 2: Lost in New York, taking place in Kevin McCallister's dreams, before being retooled into a Bobby's World game during development, retaining the same premise but replacing the characters with those of Bobby's World. However, the game was never released.
