= Leibl =

Leibl is a surname. Notable people with the surname include:

- Carl Leibl (1784–1870), German musician and conductor
- Tammy Leibl (born 1965), American volleyball and beach volleyball player
- Wilhelm Leibl (1844–1900), German painter
