= Murder of Iana Kasian =

2016 murder in Los Angeles

On May 26, 2016, Ukrainian Iana Kasian was found dead in the apartment that she had shared with her fiancé in West Hollywood. Blake Leibel, her fiancé, was convicted of first-degree murder, torture and aggravated mayhem on June 20, 2018. On June 26, 2018, he was sentenced to life in prison without parole.

== Background ==
Blake Leibel (born May 8, 1981) is a Canadian former comic book creator and graphic novelist residing in Los Angeles. Leibel was born to two notable Canadian families. His father, Lorne Leibel, is a prominent Toronto real estate mogul and Canadian Motorsport Hall of Fame inductee. His mother was Alros Products heiress Eleanor Chitel Leibel. Leibel has a brother named Cody.

In 2010, Archaia published Leibel's graphic novel Syndrome, which was a joint venture with Leibel's company Fantasy Prone. The story revolved around a sadistic doctor and a serial killer he was studying. In the graphic novel, a serial killer murders a man "by slitting his throat and hanging him by his ankles so he bled out". Leibel described the novel: "Syndrome is a story about obsession, on a number of levels, as experienced by four characters who all come from different worlds and yet find themselves embroiled in this giant, impeccably simulated environment... It's the ultimate 'backstage' story, in that sense."

Iana Kasian (Cyrillic: Яна Касьян; 27 January 1986 – 26 May 2016) was born in Kyiv, where she had studied law and worked as a prosecutor at the Ukrainian tax service.

In 2014, she immigrated to the United States and worked as a model in California. After suddenly breaking up with his wife Amanda Braun in 2015, Leibel became engaged to Kasian. On 3 May 2016, Kasian gave birth to their daughter Diana.

== Torture and murder of Iana Kasian ==
Blake Leibel
- Born: May 8, 1981 (age 45); Toronto, Ontario, Canada
- Occupations: Comic book creator, screenwriter, graphic novelist
- Known for: Torture and murder of fiancée Iana Kasian
- Notable work: Spaceballs: The Animated Series (director, 3 episodes); Syndrome (graphic novel)
- Spouse(s): Amanda Braun (2004–2015) Iana Kasian (engaged) (2015–2016, her death)
- Children: 3
- Parent: Lorne Leibel (father)
- Relatives: Cody Leibel (brother)
- Conviction: First-degree murder
- Penalty: Life imprisonment without parole

On May 24, 2016, shortly after Kasian and Leibel became engaged, and three weeks after Kasian had given birth to their daughter, Olga (Kasian's mother) went looking for Kasian, after being unable to contact her, even after making more than ten calls. The day before, Kasian had gone shopping for strollers for the baby. When Olga got the police involved, two LASD officers attempted to conduct a search of Kasian's apartment. They knocked on the door but left after no one answered. On another occasion, Olga went to the apartment alone and stood across the street, yelling at Leibel to open the door. She would testify that she "saw him approach the window, only to close it and disappear inside".

Law enforcement officers found Iana Kasian's lifeless body on May 26, 2016 in an apartment that the couple had recently shared in West Hollywood, California. They found Kasian's body lying on the bed in the master bedroom, with Blake at her side. Prosecutors said there were indications that he had been lying next to her body, which had been cleaned, for some time before police arrived. Kasian was found mutilated, drained of blood and lying in their bed. The discovery was made following a barricade stand-off between Leibel and police officers. Leibel was subsequently charged with murder, torture, mayhem and aggravated mayhem, to which he pleaded not guilty. Their infant daughter was in the care of Kasian's mother who was visiting from Ukraine and staying in a nearby apartment.

An autopsy report was released on September 20, 2017, listing Kasian's causes of death as exsanguination and head trauma. A civil lawsuit filed by the victim's mother, Olga Kasian, included transcripts of Los Angeles County Coroner Dr. James Ribe's deposition, which stated:

Kasian's entire scalp was traumatically absent and was not found, was not present with the body. Her skull had been stripped down to the surface of the bone ... There was no scalp present except for little bits in the back of the neck... portions of the right side of her face were torn away including the right ear and part of the posterior face on the (right) side, all the way down to the jawline... there were quite a number of bruises and abrasions on the face, primarily on the left side, the left cheek, and left jaw area, a number of bruises and abrasion, including one which turned out to be a human bite mark... she had lived for at least eight hours approximately after receiving the scalp injury and the bruise to the collarbone... I have never seen this before. And I doubt if hardly any forensic pathologists in this country or abroad have even seen this outside of, perhaps, wartime... So it's extremely rare...

— Dr. James Ribe, Los Angeles County Coroner's Office

== Aftermath ==
During the trial, prosecutors stated that Kasian's murder "stemmed from Leibel's jealousy and anger over the baby as well as his need for power and control over his fiancée." Leibel's brother Cody was the only family member who attended the trial, attending every day. Leibel's ex-wife Amanda Braun also attended, and through a statement from her lawyer, expressed her dismay at the crime.

On 20 June 2018, Leibel was convicted of first-degree murder, torture and aggravated mayhem. On 26 June 2018, he was sentenced to life in prison without parole. News media reported the crime as "grisly" and possibly "the most gruesome murder in the history of West Hollywood if not Los Angeles". Leibel is currently serving his sentence at the California Centinela State Prison.
