= Netzah Yehuda Battalion =

Battalion in the Israel Defense Forces

97th Netzah Yehuda Battalion
- גדוד נצח יהודה
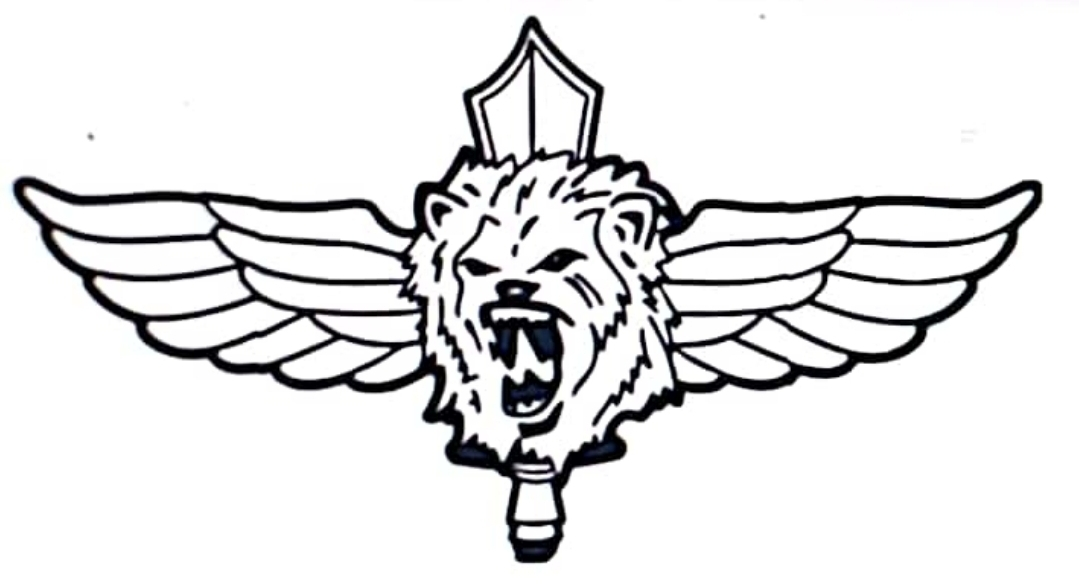
- Logo of the 97th Netzah Yehuda Battalion
- Active: 1999–present
- Country: Israel
- Type: Infantry
- Size: Battalion
- Part of: Kfir Brigade
- Area of operations: West Bank, Gaza, Golan Heights
- Motto: And your camp must be holy (Devarim 23:15 = Deuteronomy 23:14).
- Engagements: Gaza war
- Website: idf.il/kfir-brigade

Commanders
- Current commander: Lt. Col. Lior Doft

The 97th Netzah Yehuda Battalion (Hebrew: גדוד נצח יהודה, transl. 'Judah's Victory Battalion'), previously known as Nahal Haredi (הנחל החרדי) is a battalion in the Kfir Brigade of the Israel Defense Forces. The purpose of the unit is to allow Haredi Jewish men to serve as combat soldiers in the Israeli military by creating an atmosphere conducive to their religious convictions in the strict observance of Halakha. The battalion has been accused of human rights violations against Palestinians, including killing unarmed civilians, killing suspects in custody, and torture.

Despite the original purpose of the battalion being to accommodate Haredim who wish to serve in the military, as of 2012 the majority of the unit (60%) is drawn from Dati Leumi (Religious Zionist) community, specifically those as part of the Hardal sub-group. Though the Hardalim and Haredim share some similarities, the two remain distinct communities, and are both halakhic and ideological opposites on many important issues, most importantly Zionism. Many Haredi leaders publicly denounced the creation of the battalion in 2006, particularly Rabbi Aharon Shteinman, who disowned the unit entirely.

Since the unit's creation, it has attracted many members of an extreme Hardal settler group called the Hilltop Youth who are infamous for establishing illegal outposts on Palestinian land that have no legal basis in Israeli law. By 2022, the Netzah Yehuda battalion has experienced at least a half-dozen controversial cases involving its soldiers, resulting in jail time, discharge, or harsh criticism for assaulting or killing innocent Palestinians. In December 2022, Netzah Yehuda was removed by the IDF from its traditional posting in the West Bank to a border posting in the Golan Heights where the unit would be less exposed to Palestinians.

== Structure ==
Netzah Yehuda training exercise

The battalion was founded in 1999, and originally contained only 30 soldiers. As of 2009, the battalion had grown to over 1,000 soldiers, and has reached the status of a fully functioning battalion. The battalion recently marked its 20th draft.

The battalion runs like other combat units in the IDF, with five months of basic training, followed by an additional six months of advanced training.

Today, at any given time, the battalion holds close to 1,000 soldiers, including two full companies in training, one company commencing active service, and two operation units: Palchod (Recon/ First Company) and Mesaiat (Rifleman Company). A third operational unit, Mivtzayit, was created in October 2009, due to the large number of soldiers joining the battalion in the most recent drafts. In the past, there was a small special forces platoon (Machsar) composed of soldiers from the battalion, but this was disbanded shortly after Lt. Colonel Dror Shpigel became commander of the battalion.

A volunteer all-Haredi computer unit has also been created within the Israeli Air Force. This, and the Netzah Yehuda Battalion, are seen as models for the possible future incorporation of Haredi conscripts into the IDF, should the present draft exemption for the ultra-Orthodox community be lifted. The ban was lifted by a ruling of the Israel's supreme court in 2024.

Among the men who have served in the unit is Sergeant Almog Shiloni.

== Religious accommodations ==
The battalion's motto is "V'haya Machanecha Kadosh", "And Your [military] camp shall be holy", (Devarim 23:15 = Deuteronomy 23:14), a phrase taken from the Torah describing the importance of keeping a Jewish military camp free of sin or ritually unclean objects in exchange for divine assistance in battle.

As the battalion places great emphasis on accommodating the religious needs of the soldiers, the Netzah Yehuda bases follow the most rigorous standards of Jewish dietary laws, and the only women permitted on these bases are wives of soldiers and officers, so that there would not be any interaction considered inappropriate according to Jewish religious law between men and women.

As the battalion runs on a voluntary basis and does not draft soldiers, it is one of the few units in the IDF which depends on community recruitment mechanisms for new intakes. It actively recruits soldiers from ultra-Orthodox or Haredi, Religious Zionist or Dati Leumi, and the in-between Chardal families; there are also volunteers from overseas.

== History ==
=== Deployment in the West Bank ===
Founded in 1999, the battalion started off as a result of 18 months of discussions between a group of Haredi educators, led by Rabbi Yitzhak Bar-Chaim from Netzah Yehuda organization and the IDF, with just 30 soldiers in total.

The battalion had its first casualty on August 19, 2006, when a member of the Al-Aqsa Martyrs' Brigades shot and killed Staff Sergeant Roi Farjoun of Yehud at the Beka'ot Checkpoint east of Nablus. A nearby Netzah Yehuda soldier then opened fire, and killed the attacker.

Soldiers from the battalion have been accused of a series of abuses. In 2015 a combat soldier from Battalion was jailed for 9 months under aggravated circumstances, after he was convicted of having electrocuted Palestinian suspects on two separate occasions, including arresting a Palestinian suspect near the West Bank city of Jenin, blindfolding, handcuffing, beating and the attaching electrodes to the man’s neck and electrocuting him. Four other soldiers involved in similar incidents were also indicted.

In 2016, a military court sentenced an Israeli soldier from the Battalion to seven months in jail for allegedly beating detained Palestinians, arising when he beat Palestinians while they were under arrest at the battalion’s base several months prior.

In 2021, Israeli Military Police arrested four soldiers from the battalion on suspicion of beating and sexually assaulting a Palestinian suspect, after a military doctor examined him as part of the arrest procedure and found signs of violence on his body, leading to the investigation. The Palestinian detainee was held by troops in the back of a military vehicle after his arrest in the West Bank, and was allegedly beaten en-route to an army base.

In 2022, soldiers from the battalion arrested Omar Assad, a 78-year old Palestinian American man. According to his autopsy[citation needed], Assad was beaten, leading to a heart attack. The soldiers responsible were not prosecuted, but the battalion was redeployed away from the West Bank.

Until early December 2022, Netzah Yehuda was the only unit in the IDF which had been continuously stationed in the West Bank, initially in the Jordan Valley, and then the areas surrounding Jenin, Tulkarm, and Ramallah since the early 2000s, as all other units are frequently rotated between different areas.

The US State Department asked its embassy in Israel to produce a report on the battalion following allegations of abuse of Palestinians and the battalion involvement in the death of a 78-year-old Palestinian-American Omar Assad in January 2022. Following this incident the Israeli military said it would temporarily move the unit from the West Bank to the Golan Heights. The IDF said the decision "was made out of a desire to diversify their operational deployment in multiple areas, in addition to accumulating more operational experience" and was unrelated to the death of As'ad.

In March 2026, reservists from the battalion assaulted and detained CNN journalist Jeremy Diamond and his crew while they were reporting from the West Bank village of Tayasir. The IDF subsequently suspended the battalion's operational activities, apologized to CNN and promised to investigate the incident. Nagham Zbeedat of Haaretz noted the inconsistency in the IDF's responses to the attack on Diamond and his crew and the killing of the Bani Odeh family by IDF soldiers, and stated, "What has long been routine for Palestinians is now visible to an international audience, echoing the treatment Palestinians face daily, whether they are holding cameras or not."

=== Redeployment to the Golan Heights ===
In late December 2022, the unit was transferred from the IDF Central Command to the Northern Command in preparation for an 11-month deployment in the Golan Heights. The various battalion positions operated, as before, under the arrangements of Haredi practice.

=== Gaza war ===
Starting from October 7, 2023, in the wake of the October 7 attacks, soldiers of the Netzah Yehuda battalion participated in the defense of the Gaza border communities and the ensuing Gaza war. They have taken part in combat in the areas of Khan Yunis, Beit Hanoun, Jabalia, and other various locations around the strip. An investigation by CNN in July 2024 found members of Netzah Yehuda were training Israeli ground troops and running Gaza operations.

The battalion's operational activity in the West Bank was suspended by the IDF in April 2026 following an incident in which several soldiers detained CNN journalists and assaulted a cameraman.

== Leahy Law sanction ==
In April 2024, Axios reported that the US government plans to sanction the unit under the Leahy Law for human rights violations in the West Bank. The ban will prevent the battalion or any members of the battalion from receiving US aid or military training after an investigation by a State Department panel investigated and found sustained human rights violation by members of the battalion.

Israeli leaders including Benjamin Netanyahu, Yoav Gallant, and Benny Gantz criticized these sanction plans on the grounds that the Israeli justice system independently and adequately responded to the reported human rights violations. Israeli Labor Party leader Merav Michaeli called for dismantling the battalion, saying it is killing Palestinians "for no real reason."

On April 24, it was reported that the US might not impose the sanctions, with conflicting reports emerging.

== See also ==
- Hasmonean Brigade
- Shlav Bet
- Haredi Military Administration
- Chardal
- Hesder
