= Tino Insana =

American actor (1948–2017)

- Born: Silvio Peter Insana; February 15, 1948; Chicago, Illinois, U.S.
- Died: May 31, 2017 (aged 69); Los Angeles, California, U.S.
- Notable work: Three Amigos, Barnyard, Neighbors, Bubble Guppies, Bobby's World
- Spouse: Dana Moller (m. 1975)

Comedy career
- Years active: 1971–2016
- Medium: Film, television, voice-over

Silvio Peter "Tino" Insana (February 15, 1948 – May 31, 2017) was an American actor, producer, writer, and comedian.

== Life and career ==
Insana was born in Chicago, Illinois, on February 15, 1948, the son of Silvio A. Insana, a musician, and Hiloray (née Swanson). In 1971, Insana co-founded a local comedy troupe known as the West Compass Trio, along with Steve Beshekas and John Belushi. The group performed regularly in universities around the midwest until Belushi and Insana were hired by The Second City in Chicago. Insana left Second City in 1975 to form his own comedy troupe with fellow alums Jim Staahl and Jim Fisher, The Graduates. The trio made numerous appearances on television and campuses, as well as in clubs and at corporate presentations across the country. In 1977 Insana made his film debut in Rowby Goren and Chick Staley's comedy Crackin' Up. In the 1980s, Insana wrote two episodes for Police Squad! and an episode of Sledge Hammer!; he also served as story editor on both series. Insana then wrote, produced, and acted in Wedding Band and Masters of Menace.

Insana also made brief acting appearances in such films as Neighbors, Three Amigos, Who's Harry Crumb?, The Couch Trip, Oscar, and Beverly Hills Cop III. He also made guest appearances on situation comedy series such as Night Court and Mad About You.

Insana's voice has been featured in many animated television series, most notably Disney's Darkwing Duck as Dr. Reginald Bushroot and Bobby's World as Bobby's Uncle Ted. He also voiced Pig in Nickelodeon's animated film Barnyard and its subsequent spin-off TV series. In 2008, Insana voiced the role of Barf on Spaceballs: The Animated Series, inheriting the role from John Candy. He also did voice work in Goof Troop, Camp Candy, The Little Mermaid, Pepper Ann (as Pepper Ann's police officer uncle Jojo), House of Mouse, What-a-Mess, Bonkers, Aladdin, Jungle Cubs, Problem Child, Buzz Lightyear of Star Command, Teacher's Pet, and Tom and Jerry: The Movie. He was the speaking voice of Mr. Grouper in Bubble Guppies.

Insana cowrote the 1985 semi-biography The Authorized Al with "Weird Al" Yankovic.

== Retirement and death ==
In 2016, Tino Insana retired from acting. On May 31, 2017, Insana died of cancer at the age of 69 at Cedars-Sinai Medical Center in Los Angeles, California.

== Filmography ==
Film
Year	Title	Role	Notes
1977	Cracking Up	The Mailman	
1981	Neighbors	Perry Greavy	
1983	Going Berserk	Biker Leader	
1986	Three Amigos	Studio Guard	
1987	Amazon Women on the Moon	Mr. Sylvio	(segment "Video Pirates")
1988	The Couch Trip	Jail Guard #1	
1988	For Keeps	Capt. O'Connell	
1989	Who's Harry Crumb?	Smokey	
1989	Wedding Band	Hugh Bowmont	
1990	Why Me?	Cop #3 at Home	
1990	Masters of Menace	Horny Hank	
1991	Oscar	Tiny the Iceman	Uncredited
1992	Tom and Jerry: The Movie	Patrolman	Voice
1994	Beverly Hills Cop III	Burly Cop	
2006	Barnyard	Pig	Voice
Television
Year	Title	Role	Notes
1980	Big City Comedy	Various Roles	12 episodes
1990–1998	Bobby's World	Uncle Ted	Voice, 40 episodes
1991	Darkwing Duck	Dr. Reginald Bushroot / Crosby / Costumer With Dentures	Voice, 14 episodes
1992	Goof Troop	Colonel Carter	Voice, 1 episode
1992	The Little Mermaid	Baracuda	Voice, 1 episode
1993	Bonkers	Stew / Scatter Squirrel	Voice, 3 episodes
1994	Aladdin	Prince Uncouthma	Voice, 3 episodes
1997	Jungle Cubs	Fat Cat	Voice, 1 episode
1997–2000	Pepper Ann	Uncle JoJo / Earl	Voice, 12 episodes
2000	Buzz Lightyear of Star Command	Samsa	Voice, 1 episode
2000	Teacher's Pet	Deep-Sea Diving Suit	Voice, 1 episode
2000	The New Woody Woodpecker Show	Santa Claus	Voice, 1 episode
2007–2011	Back at the Barnyard	Pig / Mini-Pig	Voice, 47 episodes
2008–2009	Spaceballs: The Animated Series	Barf	Voice, 12 episodes
2011–2016	Bubble Guppies	Mr. Grouper	Voice, 79 episodes
