= Star Wars: The Emperor's New Clones =

- Directed by: Darren Scales
- Written by: Darren Scales
- Based on: Characters by George Lucas
- Produced by: Darren Scales
- Starring: Ed Hollingsbee; Mark Scales; Kirsty Milchreest; Shaun Walker; Kevin Harper; Luke Shahin-Scales; Sarah Russell; Darren Scales
- Cinematography: Dominic Gilvary
- Music by: John Williams
- Production company: Backyard Productions
- Distributed by: TheForce.net
- Release date: 9 September 2006
- Running time: 74 minutes
- Country: United Kingdom
- Language: English
- Budget: £3500 ($4,603.44 US dollars)

Star Wars: The Emperor's New Clones (often abbreviated to TENCLO) is a 2006 feature-length Star Wars fan film that spoofs the story of Revenge of the Sith. It was created by Backyard Productions UK, a British amateur film production company founded by Darren Scales, Mark Scales and Edwin Hollingsbee. The film was premiered at Whittle Hall, RAF Cranwell on 9 September 2006.

== Production ==
According to BBC News, filming was carried out in a garage studio. However, Camera Diaries claimed filming took place at RAF Waddington, and only the post-production was done in the garage studio.

== Availability ==
The full film is available to download on TheForce.net. The complete DVD is available as a BitTorrent download.

== Other Backyard Productions projects ==
The group have previously released several films: Geriatric Park (a parody of Jurassic Park, completed in 1994), Batman Returns Forever (a parody of Batman Returns and Batman Forever, completed in 1995), Star Wars: The Empire Strikes Backyard (a parody alternative to Star Wars: Episode II – Attack of the Clones inspired by the release of Star Wars: Episode I – The Phantom Menace and completed in 2000), and Doom Raiders (a parody of Indiana Jones and Tomb Raider, filmed in Cyprus and completed in 2002).

== Notes ==
- The name is a pun on the Hans Christian Andersen story, "The Emperor's New Clothes".
