= Lorne Leibel =

Canadian sailor

Personal information
- Born: 14 January 1951 (age 75) Toronto, Ontario, Canada
- Children: Blake Leibel; Cody Leibel

Sport
- Sport: Sailing

Lorne Leibel (born 14 January 1951) is a Canadian sailor and one of Canada’s wealthiest real estate developers. He competed in the Tempest event at the 1976 Summer Olympics. In 2006, he was inducted into the Canadian Motorsport Hall of Fame.

He is president of real estate developer Canada Homes.

His younger son Blake Leibel was convicted of first degree murder and was sentenced to life imprisonment without parole.
