= Jeff Hall (animator) =

American animator and director

Jeff Hall is a cartoon animator and director. His projects include Race for your life, Charlie Brown.

== Movies ==
- Race For Your Life, Charlie Brown (1977) – animator
- The Powerpuff Girls Movie (2002) – animator (uncredited)
