= David Leibel =

Israeli Haredi rabbi

- דוד לייבל
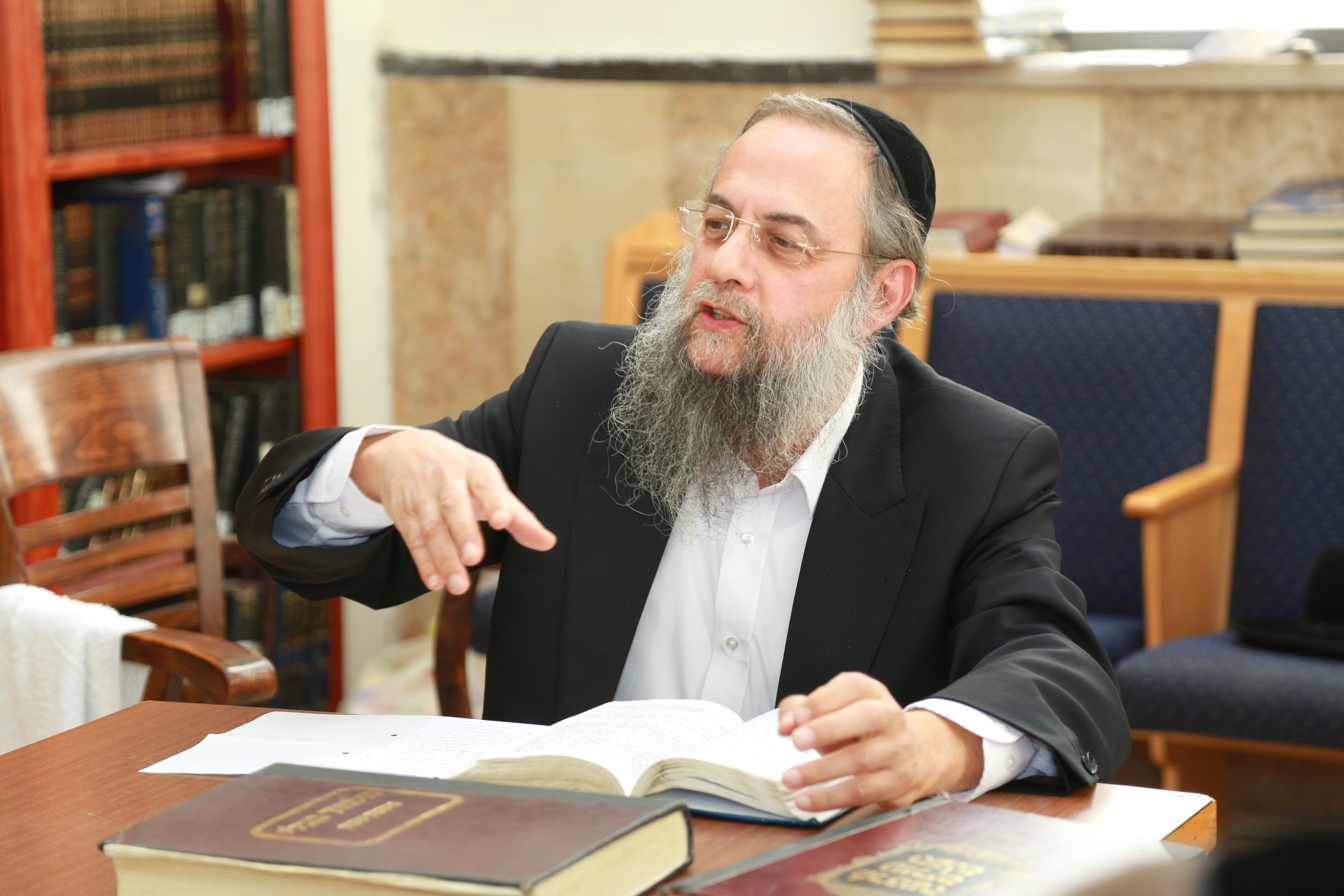
- Leibel in 2015

Personal life
- Born: David Leibel; 1954 (age 71–72) Strasbourg, France
- Education: Gateshead Talmudical College, Ponevezh Yeshiva

Religious life
- Religion: Judaism

Jewish leader
- Organisation: Achvat Torah

David Leibel (Hebrew: דוד לייבל; born c. 1954) is a French-born Israeli rabbi. He is a Haredi community leader and social entrepreneur who advocates for the integration of Torah study and professional employment. Leibel has created an alternative community infrastructure that validates the path of Haredi men who combine work with traditional religious observance. He also calls for civic integration that includes serving in the Israel Defense Forces and participating in national remembrance days.

== Biography ==
David (Dovid) Leibel was born and raised in Strasbourg, France. He studied at the Gateshead Yeshiva in the United Kingdom and the Ponevezh Yeshiva in Bnei Brak after immigrating to Israel at the age of 18. At Ponevezh, Leibel became a top student of Rabbi Elazar Shach, a leading figure in the non-Hasidic Lithuanian Haredi world.

== Business career ==
At the age of 40, Leibel entered the diamond business, working at the Israel Diamond Exchange in Ramat Gan, while continuing to teach three hours a day.

== Educational and social initiatives ==
In 2011, Leibel founded Achvat Torah (lit. "Torah Brotherhood"). The organization serves as a network of evening kollels tailored specifically for working Haredi men. It has grown into a network of over 90 communities across Israel and internationally. Achvat Torah provides a supportive social ecosystem where working Haredim can learn Talmud without feeling alienated from society at large.

In 2013, Leibel founded JBH (Jewish Brain in Hi-tech), a college designed to train ultra-Orthodox men in computer science and advanced technologies. Students commit to a rigorous dual curriculum, spending half a day studying Torah and the other half mastering software engineering. To ensure successful employment, the institution pairs with Avratech, a software house where graduates enter the high-tech workforce while maintaining their religious routines.

In 2024, Leibel established an advanced yeshiva that integrates religious Torah studies with an academic degree program. His L'Ovda initiative provides structured vocational tracking for practical trades such as electrical work, offering career paths for all members of the community.

== Views and opinions ==
Mainstream Israeli Haredi society has championed the "society of learners" (hevrat halomdim) model which mandates that men study Torah full-time in a kollel (yeshiva for married men) while relying on government subsidies or their wives' income. Leibel has publicly challenged this consensus, arguing that a lifestyle combining professional work and dedicated Torah study should be seen as a legitimate path rather than a compromise.

Liebel believes that a working Haredi man who sets aside time for daily learning holds equal spiritual standing to a full-time yeshiva student. In his view, employment allows young men to provide for their families with dignity and avoid financial hardship. He argues against the prevailing notion that full-time Torah study provides spiritual defense for the state, emphasizing that traditional texts say such protection applies to individuals, not an entire nation.

Leibel has broken sharply with mainstream Haredi political leadership regarding military service. As an outspoken proponent of national unity and civic duty, he has actively assisted Israeli authorities in establishing a dedicated Haredi formation, the Hasmonean Brigade, to enable ultra-Orthodox men to serve in the Israel Defense Forces without compromising their religious lifestyle. Some 400 Haredim also serve in Kodcode, a special track that drafts Haredi men in high-tech units. In 2026, Leibel publicly urged the Haredi sector to reconsider its traditional abstention from Holocaust Remembrance Day (Yom HaShoah). He argued that modern commemoration is focused on sharing national pain over the six million Jews killed by the Nazis, and urged Haredi institutions to participate through the recitation of Psalms (Tehillim), thereby showing solidarity with Israeli society as a whole.

Leibel's vocal opposition to established political and rabbinic figures has drawn backlash from the Haredi mainstream, including leadership figures affiliated with the Degel HaTorah party. His stance on the IDF draft has made him a target for extremist factions. Demonstrators have targeted his home, prompting counter-petitions from progressive Haredi activist groups that support his vision. Leibel has publicly denounced violent protesters as "thugs who desecrate God's name in public," and stated that they have no true part in the world of Torah.
