= Shachtman =

Shachtman (also spelled Shactman, Shechtman, Schachtman, Shekhtman, and Schechtman) is an Ashkenazi Jewish surname. It is derived from the words 'shecht' and 'man', meaning "one who engages in ritual slaughter". Notable people with the name include:

- Anna Shechtman (born 1990), American journalist
- Brian Shactman, American journalist
- Dan Shechtman (born 1941), Israeli Nobel laureate in chemistry
- Edna Schechtman (1948–2022), Israeli statistician
- Eli Schechtman (1908–1996), Ukrainian-Israeli Yiddish writer
- Ella Shado-Shechtman, Israeli officer
- Gideon Schechtman (born 1947), Israeli mathematician
- Joseph Schechtman (1891–1970), Russian-American activist and author
- Lev Shekhtman (born 1951), Ukrainian-American theater director
- Max Shachtman (1904–1972), American Marxist theorist
- Manuil Shechtman (1900–1941), Ukrainian-Jewish painter
- Noah Shachtman (born 1977), American journalist
- Tom Shachtman (born 1942), American author and filmmaker
- Vadim Schechtman (born 1954), Russian mathematician
- Yoav Shechtman (born 1980), Israeli physicist
