= Women in the Israel Defense Forces =

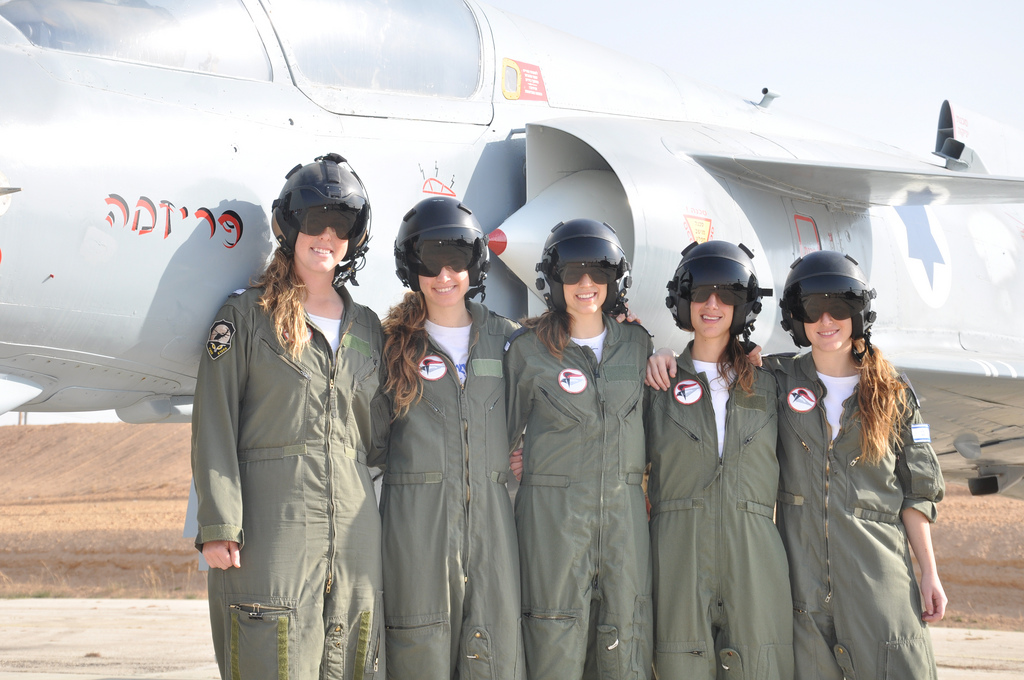
Female graduates of the Israeli Air Force flight course, 2011

Israel is one of only a few countries where military service is compulsory for many able-bodied female citizens. Under Israeli conscription laws, the Israel Defense Forces (IDF) may draft recruits from three communities: the Jews, the Druze, and the Circassians. As the latter two communities are less populous, their women are not required to serve. Women from the Jewish majority are not exempted from the conscription laws, but serve for slightly shorter terms than male conscripts. All women who are exempted from the conscription laws may still enlist voluntarily. Jewish women who are called up for military service may apply for an exemption on humanitarian, religious, or certain legal grounds. Those who claim such an exemption will typically be redirected to Sherut Leumi, the alternative means of national service.

According to Israeli military statistics, 535 female soldiers had been killed while serving between the years of 1962 and 2016. The IDF's regulated integration of women is rooted in the days of the Yishuv, when Jewish women served in the ranks of various Zionist paramilitaries during the 1947–1949 Palestine War. In 1999–2000, an amendment was made to the Women's Equal Rights Law of Israel by which men and women became fully equalized — although separately — in the Israeli military apparatus.

Until 2001, female conscripts served in the Women's Corps, or Chayil Nashim (CHEN; Hebrew: ח״ן). After a five-week-long period in basic training, they could serve as clerks, drivers, welfare workers, nurses, radio operators, flight controllers, ordnance personnel, and course instructors. As of 2011, around 88% of all IDF roles were open to female candidates. As of 2010, women were enlisted in 69% of all military positions available to them.

Amidst the 2014 Gaza War, the IDF stated that fewer than 4% of their female soldiers were enlisted in combat positions, such as infantry and helicopter/fighter pilots, and that they were instead concentrated in a variety of "combat-support" positions.

During Hamas's October 7 surprise attack on Israel, women soldiers took a vital role in the defence operations fighting Hamas. For the first time in Israeli history, many women soldiers were abducted by Hamas to the Gaza Strip. Later, during the phase of the ground fighting in the Gaza Strip, female fighters and medical women entered the Gaza Strip as part of the operation.

== History ==
=== Pre-independence ===
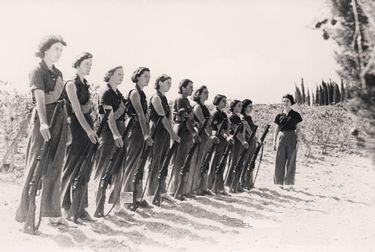
Jewish women of the Yishuv in training at Mishmar HaEmek during the 1947–1949 Palestine War

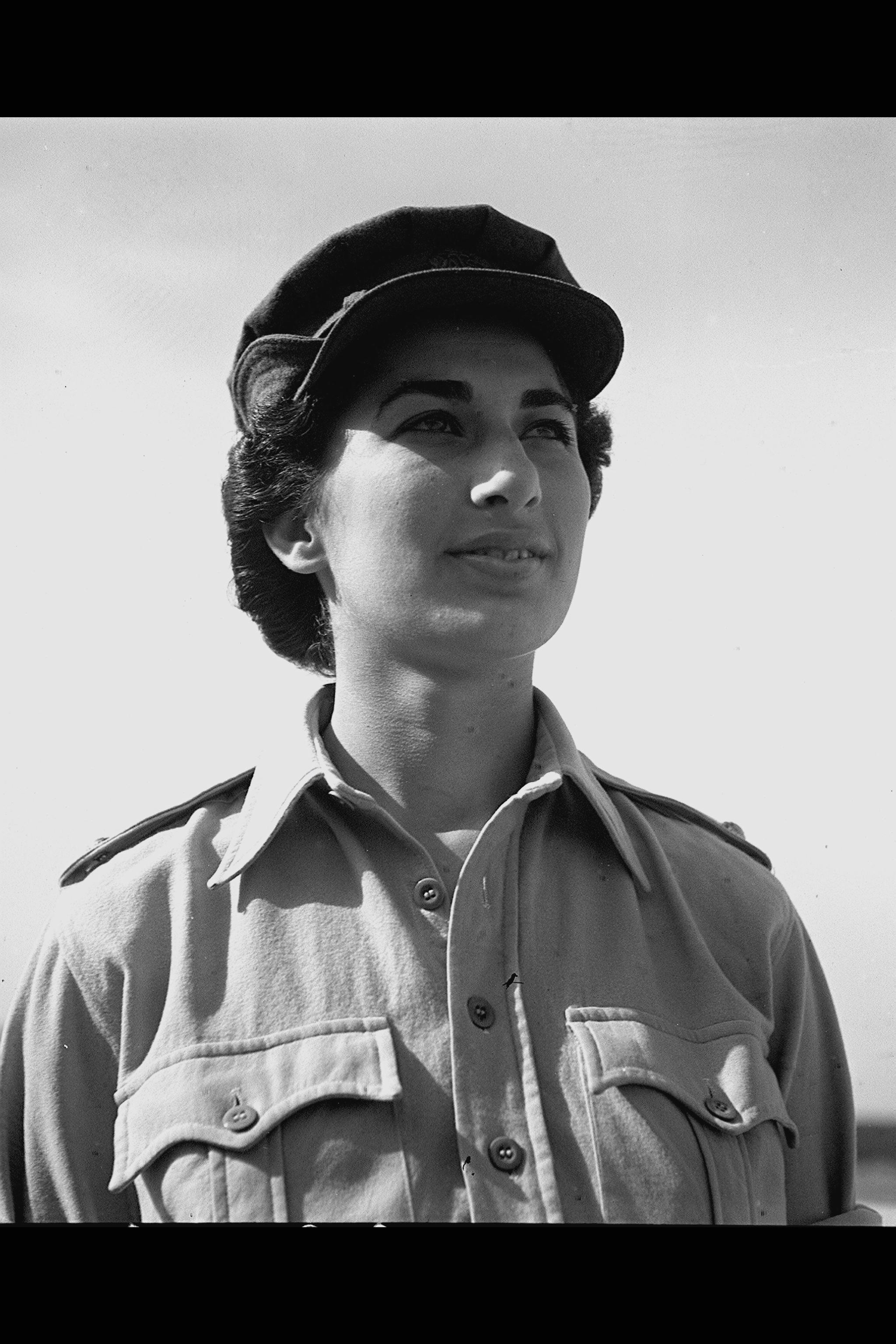
A Jewish officer of the British Army's Auxiliary Territorial Service during World War II

Before the formal establishment of Israel in 1948, women served in combat roles within the Jewish paramilitary groups of British Palestine that would later become the central component of the Israel Defense Forces (IDF); the rate of women who were enlisted in combat organizations stood at 20 percent. In the years leading up to the establishment of the IDF, military service for women existed in the lines of the Hashomer and Haganah paramilitary forces. The Haganah stated in its law that its lines were open to "Every Jewish male or female, who is prepared and trained to fulfill the obligation of national defense." Most female recruits served as medics, communications specialists, and weaponeers. During World War II, among the 30,000 Jews from Palestine who joined the British Armed Forces were about 4,000 women who volunteered for the Auxiliary Territorial Service and Women's Auxiliary Air Force.

During the 1940s in Tel Aviv, a battalion was established in which women filled positions in security, weapons transport, and manned anti-aircraft posts. During the winter of 1948, women joined the combat ranks of the Palmach and traveled from Tel Aviv to Jerusalem with their weapons concealed inside their clothes. The Palmach arm (thirty percent of which were women) trained nine female platoon commanders, and numerous other female squad commanders.

=== Arab-Israeli War (1948) ===
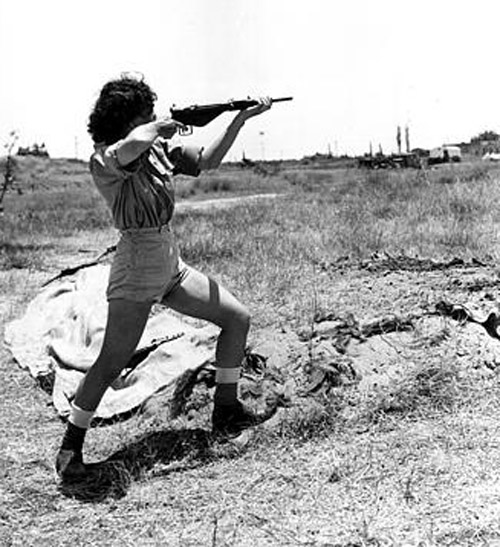
Female officer of the Haganah giving a handling demonstration for the Sten gun during the 1948 Arab–Israeli War

On 26 May 1948, David Ben-Gurion officially set up the IDF as the military force of Israel. On 18 August 1948, mandatory conscription began for all childless Israeli women who were born between 1920 and 1930, regardless of whether they were single or married.

Women served in many positions, including as nurses, signal operators, drivers, clerks, and cooks. The Women's Corps, under which all female Israeli soldiers served, was responsible for taking care of their needs, training, and integration into different IDF units. The Women's Corps also sent young, qualified female soldiers to be teachers in Israel's then-developing areas and immigrant neighbourhoods.

=== Post-independence ===
Female Israeli military officer graduates, 1950

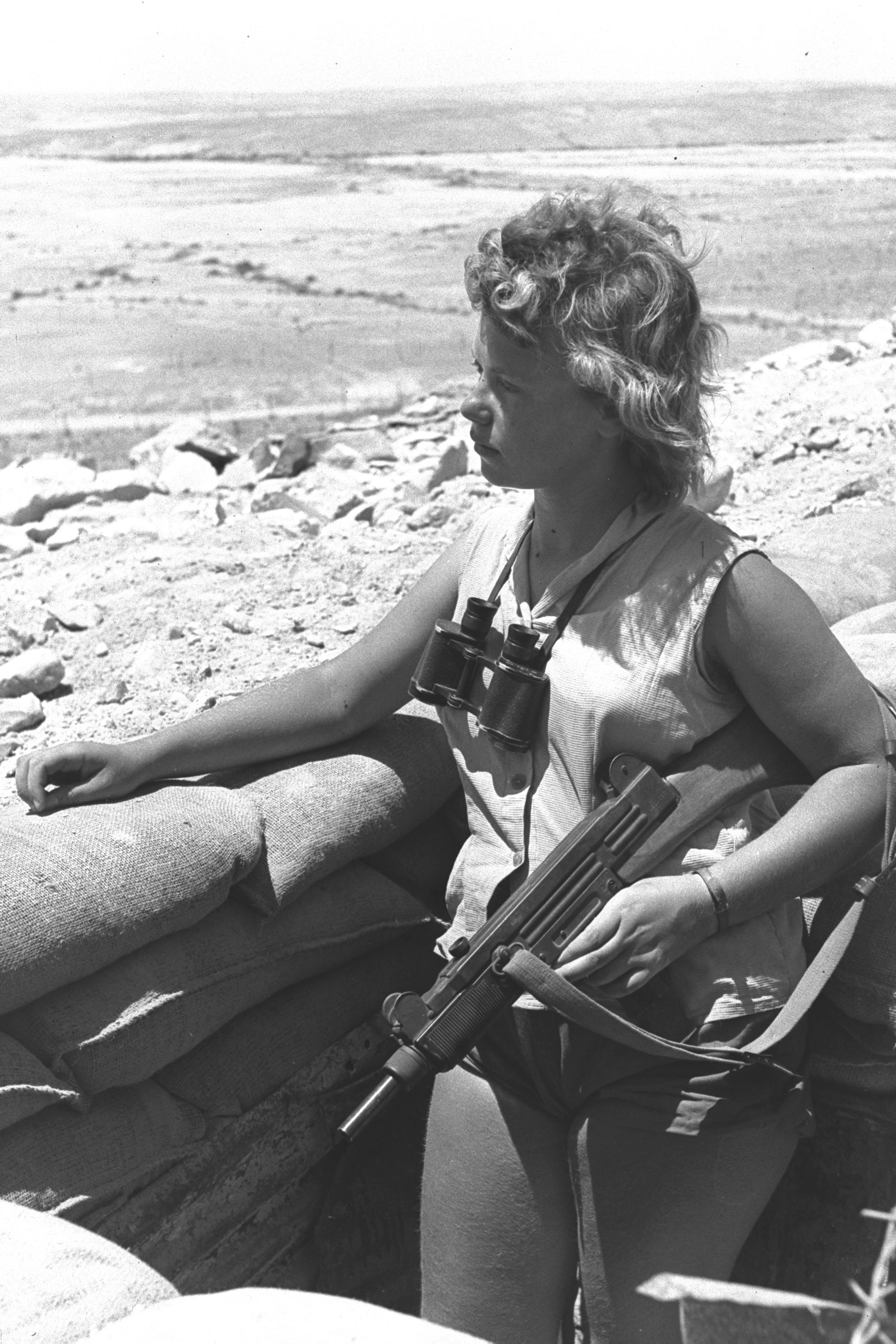
Female Israeli militia guard in the Negev during the period of reprisal operations, 1956

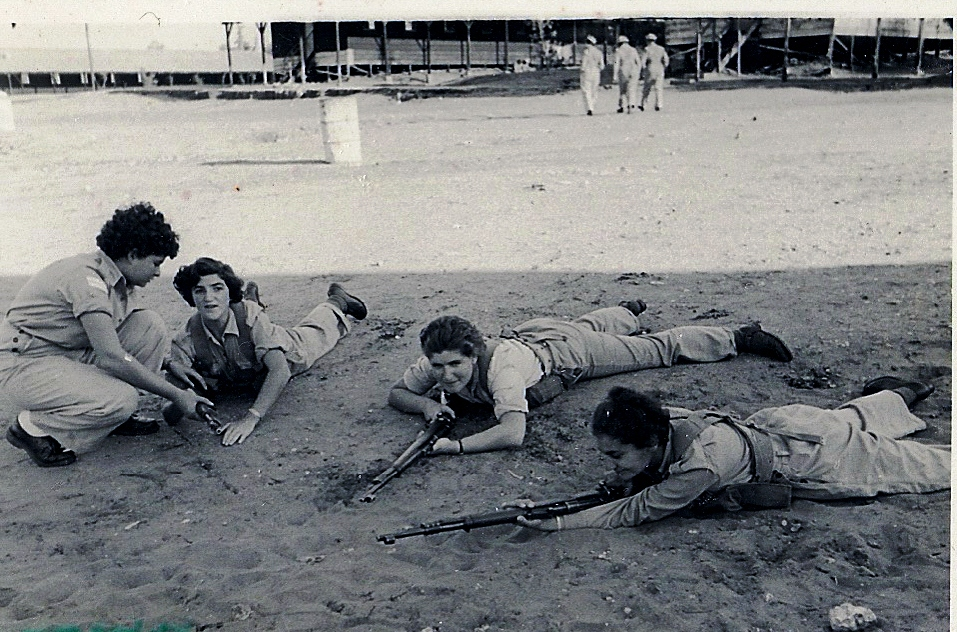
Female Israeli soldiers in training, 1953–1954

Apart from the 1948 Arab–Israeli War, when extreme manpower shortages brought many female Israeli soldiers into land battles, women were historically prohibited by the Israeli government to go into battle, and instead served in a variety of technical and administrative support roles. Soon after the establishment of the IDF, a decree for the removal of women from frontline positions was brought into effect, and all female soldiers were accordingly pulled back into more secure areas. The cited rationale for this decision revolved around concerns over the high possibility of female Israeli soldiers being captured and subsequently raped or sexually assaulted by hostile Arab forces. While the consensus was that it was fair and equitable to demand equal sacrifice and service from women, it was argued that the risk of Israeli prisoners of war being subjected to sexual abuse was infinitely greater for female soldiers than it was for male soldiers, and therefore unacceptable. A majority of women serving in the IDF then took up positions as secretaries while the rest served primarily as instructors, nurses, clerks, and telephone operators. A few women flew transport missions in the 1950s; some women were accepted into flight training in the 1970s, but did not complete the program before it was closed to women.

The army is the supreme symbol of duty and as long as women are not equal to men in performing this duty, they have not yet obtained true equality. If the daughters of Israel are absent from the army, then the character of the Yishuv will be distorted.

— David Ben-Gurion, first Israeli Prime Minister

Yael Rom, the first female pilot trained by the Israeli Air Force, earned her wings in 1951.

Hava Inbar, a lawyer, was appointed as the judge of the Israeli military court in Haifa in September 1969, thus becoming the first female military judge in the world. She stated in an interview: "I do not know if I want to be a military judge my whole life, but I am glad that I was appointed; it proves that the IDF leaves almost all doors open for its female soldiers."

Due to a rapidly growing need for ground forces during the 1973 Arab–Israeli War, women were needed in field roles. According to Rina Bar-Tal, then-chair of the Israel Women's Network, roles for women beyond technical and secretarial support only started to open up in the late 1970s and early 1980s due to manpower shortages. Since then, a few women have earned ranks higher than colonel. In 1986, Amira Dotan, then-head of the Women's Corps, became the first female brigadier-general. In July 2018, female IDF captain Or Naʽaman ordered a Patriot missile battery to shoot down a Syrian drone and fighter jet over the Golan Heights, which earned her a military certificate of appreciation.

== Gender equality ==
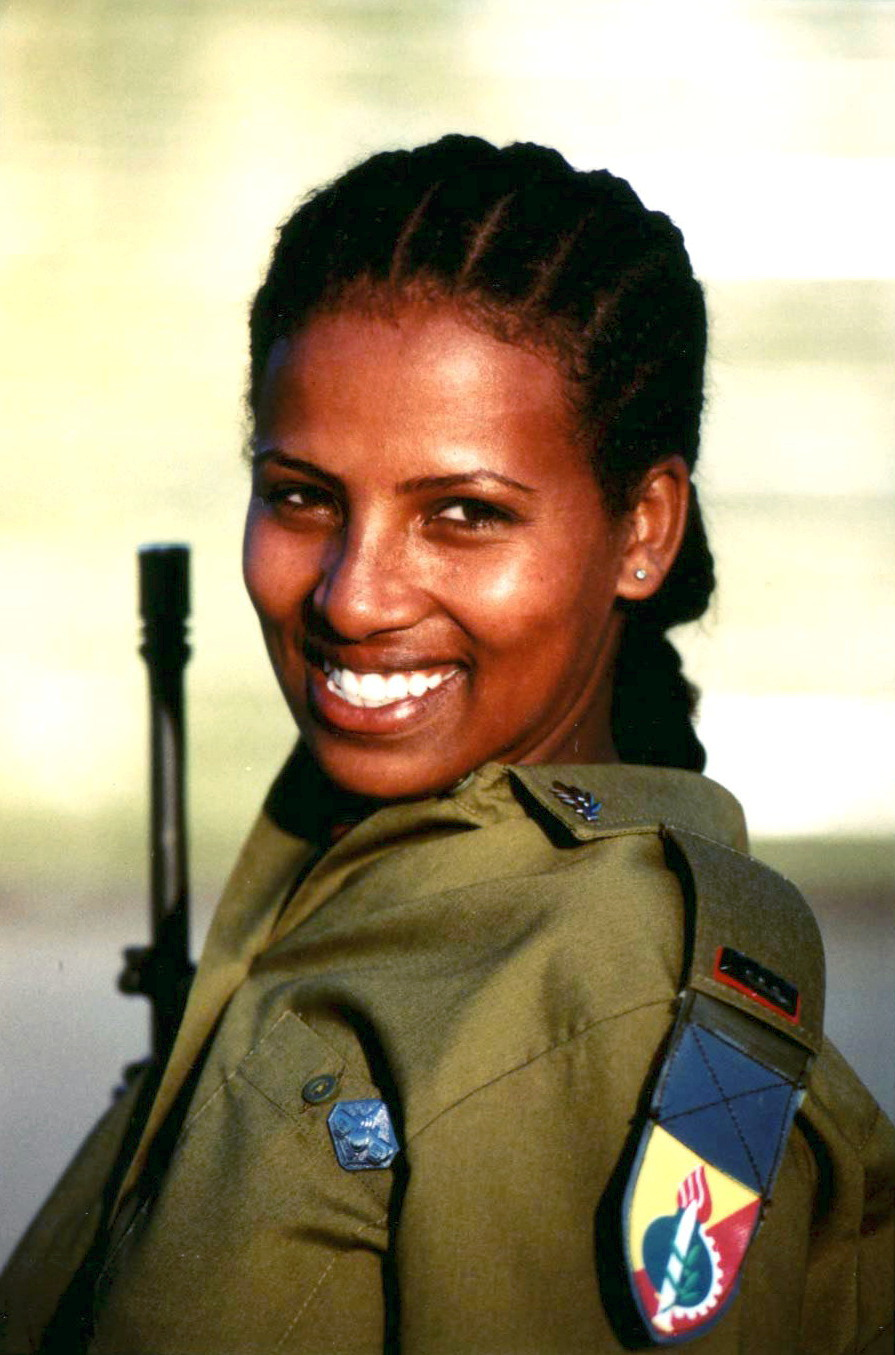
First female Israeli ordnance officer of Beta Israel origin, 2001

Civilian pilot and aeronautical engineer Alice Miller successfully petitioned the Israeli Supreme Court to rule in favour of her taking pilot training exams with the Israeli Air Force (IAF) after she was rejected on gender grounds. During this time, former president and IAF commander Ezer Weizman openly opposed her campaign. Although Miller did not pass the examination, the ruling was a watershed and opened doors for Israeli women in new military roles. Female legislators took advantage of the momentum to draft a bill that allowed women to volunteer for any position they could qualify for.

In 2000, an amendment to the Women's Equal Rights Law of Israel with regards to military service states that "The right of women to serve in any role in the IDF is equal to the right of men." The amendment, drafted by female lawmakers, grants equal opportunities to women who are found to be physically and personally suitable for a job; the question of exactly who and what was "suitable" was left to the discretion of military leaders on a case-by-case basis. Following the amendment, a modest number of women began to enlist in combat support and light combat roles in a few areas, including the Artillery Corps, infantry units, and various armored divisions. By 2000, Caracal became a full-fledged mixed-sex infantry battalion. Many women also joined the Border Police.

The first female Israeli fighter pilot, Roni Zuckerman, received her wings in 2001. By 2006, the first female pilots and navigators graduated from the IAF training course and several hundred women entered combat units, primarily in support roles such as intelligence gatherers, instructors, social workers, medics, and engineers. The 2006 Lebanon War marked the first time since 1948 that female soldiers were active in field operations alongside male soldiers. Airborne helicopter engineer Keren Tendler was the first female Israeli combat soldier to be killed in an active warzone after the passing of the amendment. In November 2007, the IAF appointed its first female deputy squadron commander.

On 23 June 2011, Orna Barbivai became the first female aluf in the Israeli military upon her promotion to the role of commander of the Manpower Directorate; she was the second woman to serve on the General Staff. In 2012, Merav Buchris became the first female ammunitions officer in the IAF. In 2013, in a first, a female IDF soldier was called up to the Torah during a service on a military base. In the same year, the Israeli military announced that it would, for the first time in Israel's history, allow a transgender woman to serve in the army as a female soldier.

In 2014, there were several more firsts for women in the Israeli military: Oshrat Bacher was appointed as Israel's first female combat-battalion commander; the first female combat doctor was appointed to the elite Duvdevan Unit; and female kashrut supervisors were allowed to work in kitchens on military bases.

In 2026, Israeli Air Force officer G. was promoted to brigadier general and appointed Israeli air attaché in Washington. She is the first woman from the Israeli Air Force's aircrew to reach that rank. She was also the first woman to command an operational flight squadron and the first woman to command an Israeli Air Force base.

== Service requirements ==
The mandated military service requirement for Jewish-Israeli women is 24 months, apart from specified roles that instead require a service length of 30 months. Women may be exempted from military service for reasons of religious conscience, marriage, pregnancy, or motherhood. A woman may receive an exemption on religious grounds under the following conditions:

1. She has declared that for reasons of conscience, or a religious way of life, she is prevented from doing military service and has proven this to the satisfaction of the exemption committee.
2. She keeps the laws of Kashrut at home and outside.
3. She does not travel on Shabbat.

Women who arrive in Israel at age 17 and over are generally exempt from military service, but may serve on a voluntary basis. Additionally, women are generally not called up for reserve duty if they are married or if they are beyond the age of 24.

== Combat roles ==
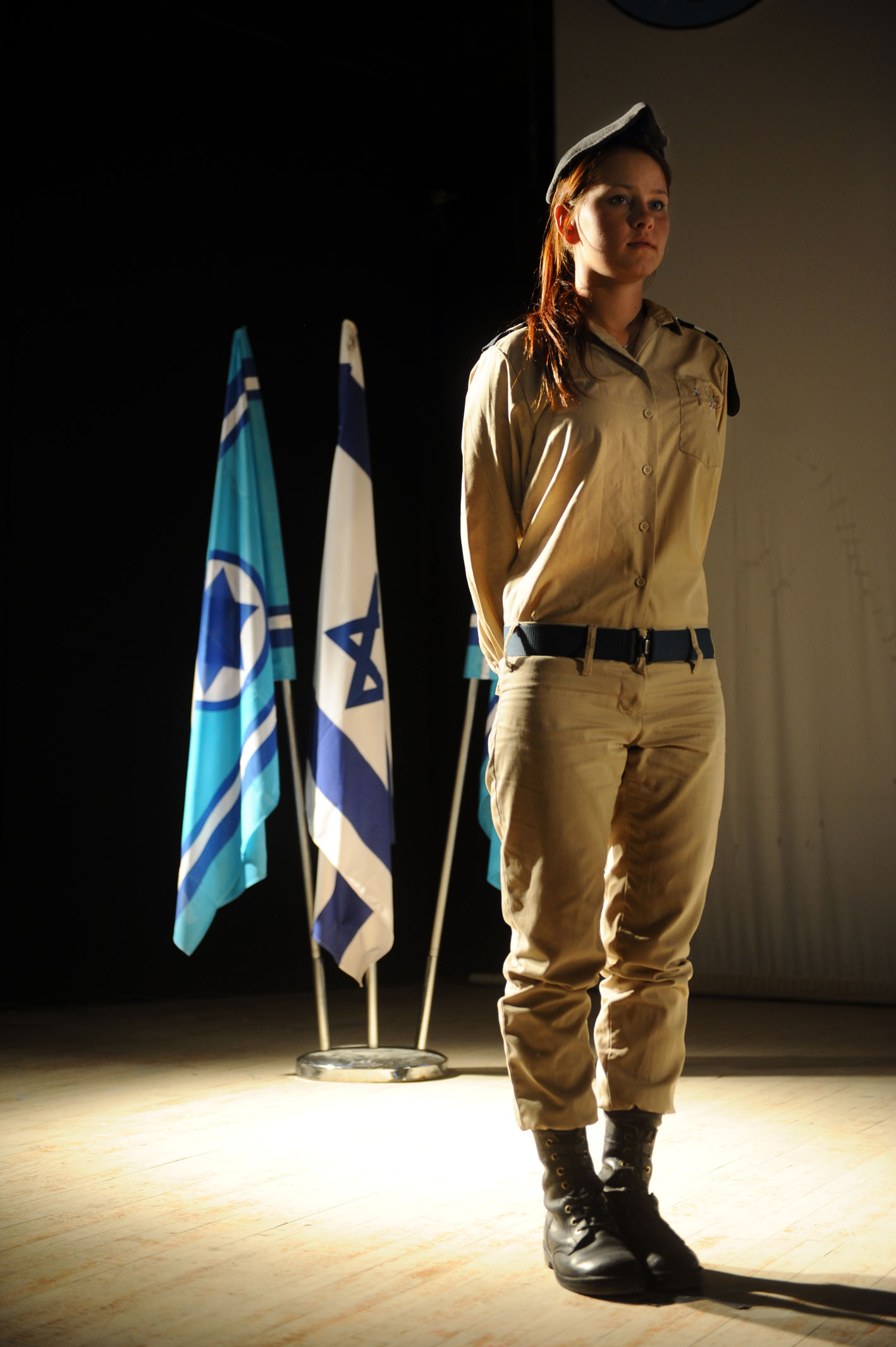
Israeli medic Anastasia Bagdalov, awarded a military commendation for her role during the 2011 Sinai attacks, when she treated multiple wounded passengers (2012)

Clause 16A of the Israeli Defense Service Law requires that all conscripted female combat soldiers serve active-duty for 2 years and 4 months, and in reserve until the age of 38. Each year, 1,500 female soldiers are drafted into the Israel Defense Forces (IDF). Women were employed in full combat roles during the 1947–1949 Palestine War; incidents involving the abuse of female soldiers' corpses by Arab troops led to the Israeli cabinet's decision to withdraw women from frontline combat until 2000, when the Caracal Battalion was raised.

In 2014, the IDF appointed Oshrat Bacher as the first female commander of a combat battalion.

The most notable combat option for women is the light-infantry Caracal Battalion, in which women comprise 70 percent of the troop strength. There are two other mixed-sex infantry battalions: the Lions of Jordan Battalion and the Bardelas Battalion. The Oketz, an IDF canine unit, also drafts women as combat soldiers. Women are also allowed to join the Combat Intelligence Collection Corps, and to serve as search-and-rescue personnel in the IDF's Home Front Command. Women are allowed to serve as tank crews in the Border Defense Array, composed of units that guard the borders of Israel with Egypt and Jordan.

Despite being officially classified as combat soldiers, women in combat roles are not explicitly deployed into combat situations. They are expected to respond in the event a combat situation does erupt, but are not deployed to areas where there is a high risk of combat. The three mixed-sex infantry battalions and female-crewed tanks are deployed to border patrol duties and security duties in the Jordan Valley, and female soldiers are barred from joining the frontline combat brigades that are deployed in the event of war.

In 2023, the Caracal unit was involved in intense fighting when Hamas militants infiltrated the border area near Gaza in October 2023. The female soldiers battled militants for nearly four hours as part of the broader effort to repel the incursion. By some accounts, they played a decisive part in the clashes, with estimates that the unit killed around 100 Hamas members. None of the female combat soldiers were killed during the engagement, which has been characterized as a validation of their abilities. The unit's performance in real-world combat against Hamas is also seen as proof that women can execute infantry missions effectively when given the requisite training.

In February 2026, the IDF appointed its first female naval missile boat commander, Lt.-Commander “R.” She took command of a missile boat participating in operational activity, including actions related to the Syrian navy.

== Gender Affairs Advisor ==
In 2000, the Women's Corps was dismantled so that female soldiers would be able to fall under the authority of individual units based on their jobs and not on their gender; they would likewise wear the insignia of their units instead of the insignia of the Women's Corps. The position of Gender Affairs Advisor to the Chief of Staff was created in 2001. Female officers who hold the position are in charge of ensuring more opportunities and a suitable environment for female soldiers as well as outlets for the enhancement of their skills. The mission of the advisor is described by the Israeli military as "empowering women, the IDF and Israeli society by promoting conditions that allow for the optimal use of the capabilities of women serving in the IDF; promoting equal opportunities for women during their military service; and assimilating women into military leadership positions."

== Service exemptions ==
In 2020, 55% of eligible women were drafted into the IDF. Of those granted an exemption, 35-36% were exempted for religious reasons. A law passed in 1978 made exemptions for women on religious grounds automatic upon the signing of a simple declaration attesting to the observance of orthodox religious practices. This legislation raised considerable controversy, and IDF officials feared that the exemption could be abused by any non-religious woman who did not wish to serve and thus further exacerbate the already strained personnel resources of the Israeli military. Women exempted on religious grounds were legally obliged to fulfill a period of alternative service doing social or educational work assigned to them. In practice, however, women performed such service only on a voluntary basis.

== Segev committee report (2007) ==
In 2007, Elazar Stern, the then-head of the Manpower Directorate, appointed a committee to define women's service in the Israel Defense Forces (IDF) in the next decade, with the objective of increasing equal opportunities for female service members. The committee, headed by Yehuda Segev, submitted its report to Stern in September 2007.

In September 2008, the 100-page report was presented to Gabi Ashkenazi, the then-Chief of Staff, who voiced support for the committee's vision:

The IDF, as a leading organization in Israeli society, designates the service of men and women to a fulfilling and respectful service based upon equal opportunities in the service of [the] IDF and the State of Israel.

The committee called for the annulment of the model that has been in place since the 1950s, under which a soldier's length of service and service options is largely determined by their gender. On this model, the report stated: "This is an archaic model that causes under-utilization of the resources ... of half of Israeli society, and closes off many opportunities, both during service and for integrating into society after service."

In 2007, 12 percent of all IDF jobs were completely closed to women. The report partially attributed this closure to the shorter length of service for conscripted women that reportedly served as a barrier to drafting women into the most important, in-demand jobs. The committee claimed that military job postings are "to a large extent" determined by gender rather than an individual soldier's talents and abilities, and that the length of service "should depend solely on the job, rather than on one's gender."

The report advised making it harder for women to get an exemption from mandatory military service and curbing the common phenomenon of women falsely claiming exemptions on religious grounds. It also said the criteria for exemptions from service should be the same for both men and women. The panel recommended mandatory quotas for promoting women, with the goal of giving women a "significant presence" in the "senior decision-making ranks" of the military. Additionally, it called for creating an effective and well-funded system to ensure proper working environments for both male and female soldiers, and for drafting a "gender code" that would lay down explicit rules for interaction between the two sexes: "There should be no jobs or units categorically closed to either women or men ... Service in all units, postings and missions would be joint, subject to the rules of appropriate integration."

The report proposed opening all jobs to women aside from a handful that would be determined by a special committee, whose decisions would require the approval of the Chief of Staff, the Defense Minister, and the Foreign Affairs and Defense Committee of the Knesset. It said the initial screening and assignment process should be unified so that men and women are part of the same system and receive their assignments based on the same criteria, including for acceptance into combat units; the panel proposed implementing this change gradually — over the course of a decade.

== Issues ==
=== Religious objections ===
In 1950, Yitzhak HaLevi Herzog and Ben-Zion Meir Hai Uziel, both chief rabbis, issued a ruling that forbade women joining the Israel Defense Forces (IDF). In the 1980s, Meir Kahane, a far-right rabbi, ardently opposed women serving in the IDF, and advocated alternative national service instead. As of 2014, David Lau and Yitzhak Yosef of the Chief Rabbinate of Israel were opposed to religious women serving in the military, as was Shmuel Eliyahu.

However, Yair Lapid has opposed this position and consequently campaigned for the removal of Lau and Yosef from the Chief Rabbinate. On the issue, Naftali Bennett stated: "I believe that all girls should do either IDF service or national service. With that, the attack on the rabbis for their traditional position is an unacceptable attack on the respect due them." Orthodox rabbi Shai Piron also voiced his support for the chief rabbis' injunction against observant women enlisting in the IDF. In 2003, Piron stated: “I don’t know of any rabbis that would allow [observant women] to serve in the army. The halakhic authorities saw the reality from a joint education and spiritual perspective, this view led them to their halakhic conclusion… The problem with IDF service is the general atmosphere that does not allow for a life without [religious] pitfalls.”

In response, politician Elazar Stern said: "A week ago the Chief Rabbis announced that a female serving in the IDF results in an aveira similar to Chillul Shabbos. This is tantamount to issuing a call to women, at least those who view themselves as religious, not to serve in the IDF... I served in the IDF for a few years and I state the military cannot function without women unless we lengthen the service of males to 4.5 years. The price that we will pay by the call of the Chief Rabbinate council that females do not enlist is not that of our daughters, but the daughters of these very same rabbis who don't serve." Rabbi Shlomo Riskin of Efrat has supported women's enlistment in the IDF. In 2014, the Beit Hillel association of national-religious rabbis issued a ruling in Jewish law stating that women are allowed to serve in the IDF; however, rabbi Shlomo Aviner claimed that Beit Hillel did not have the authority to make such a ruling. Under the Israeli Defense Service Law, observant Jewish women are provided with the option of alternative national service instead of enlisting in the IDF.

The IDF offers Haredi Jewish men "women-free and secular-free" recruitment centres. Moshe Yaʽalon, former IDF Chief of Staff, expressed his willingness to relax regulations to meet the demands of ultra-Orthodox rabbis. Regulations regarding gender equality had already been relaxed so that Haredim could be assured that men would not receive physical exams from female medical staff.

=== Sexual harassment ===
In Israel and Its Army: From Cohesion to Confusion, Stuart A. Cohen has argued that prior to the 1990s, there had existed a general consensus in the IDF that "sexual prowess goes hand in hand with military accomplishment." Even when social attitudes were changing in the 1980s, the IDF was still inclined towards tolerance and a senior army official warned of not blowing the "topic out of all proportion." In 1993, it was reported that only 10 percent of around 1,000 annually reported cases of sexual harassment are investigated. Reports of sexual harassment against women in the Israeli military reached an average of one case per day in 1999 — an increase on the 280 complaints received in 1997.

In 1998–1999, 54 officers were expelled from the IDF on charges of sexual misconduct while others faced demotion or imprisonment. In one high-profile case, Yitzchak Mordechai was charged with sexual assault and harassment. Another case involved the promotion of General Nir Galili, who was accused of grooming a young female recruit for sexual relations. This issue has led to the description of the Israeli military by the American feminist writer Laura Sjoberg as a "hothouse for exploitive sexual relationships" and a force whose fighting culture is based on "rampant licentiousness." While the IDF has since tried to curb sexual harassment, it remains a problem. In 2004, it was reported that 1 in 5 female Israeli soldiers suffer sexual harassment.

=== Singing controversy ===
In September 2011, because of a religious ban on men hearing women sing, nine religiously observant cadets in the IDF officers course walked out of an evening seminar on the legacy of Operation Cast Lead, during which a band comprising two male and two female vocalists took to the stage to sing. The commander of the school expelled four of them after they said they would disobey orders again in similar situations. The IDF agreed to re-examine regulations on this issue, given the growing presence of Haredi soldiers in combat units.

=== All-woman Israeli tank crew fight (2023) ===
Seven Israeli tank crew members from the Caracal battalion fought against Hamas fighters on October 7, 2023, continuously for 17 hours straight. 20-year-old tankers Hagar, Hila, Tal Sara, Michal, Karni, Ophir and Tamar fought against hundreds of fighters equipped with Rocket-propelled grenades. According to the IDF, the young women were the first ever female tank crews in the West to engage in active combat, lasting for 17 hours. Having received an order to move out from the border with Egypt, they moved north near the border with the Gaza Strip. They are reported to have killed 50 fighters.

=== Israeli Female Soldiers on Social Media ===
The IDF, using the hashtag #HotGuyShit, shared a post featuring female Israeli soldiers imitating male soldiers, accompanied by the caption: “Just a bunch of strong women defending their country.” Rebecca L. Stein, a writer and cultural anthropologist at Duke University, believes this move is merely a propaganda tool, suggesting that the Israeli army aims to highlight the presence of women in the military through an appealing narrative.

== Gallery ==
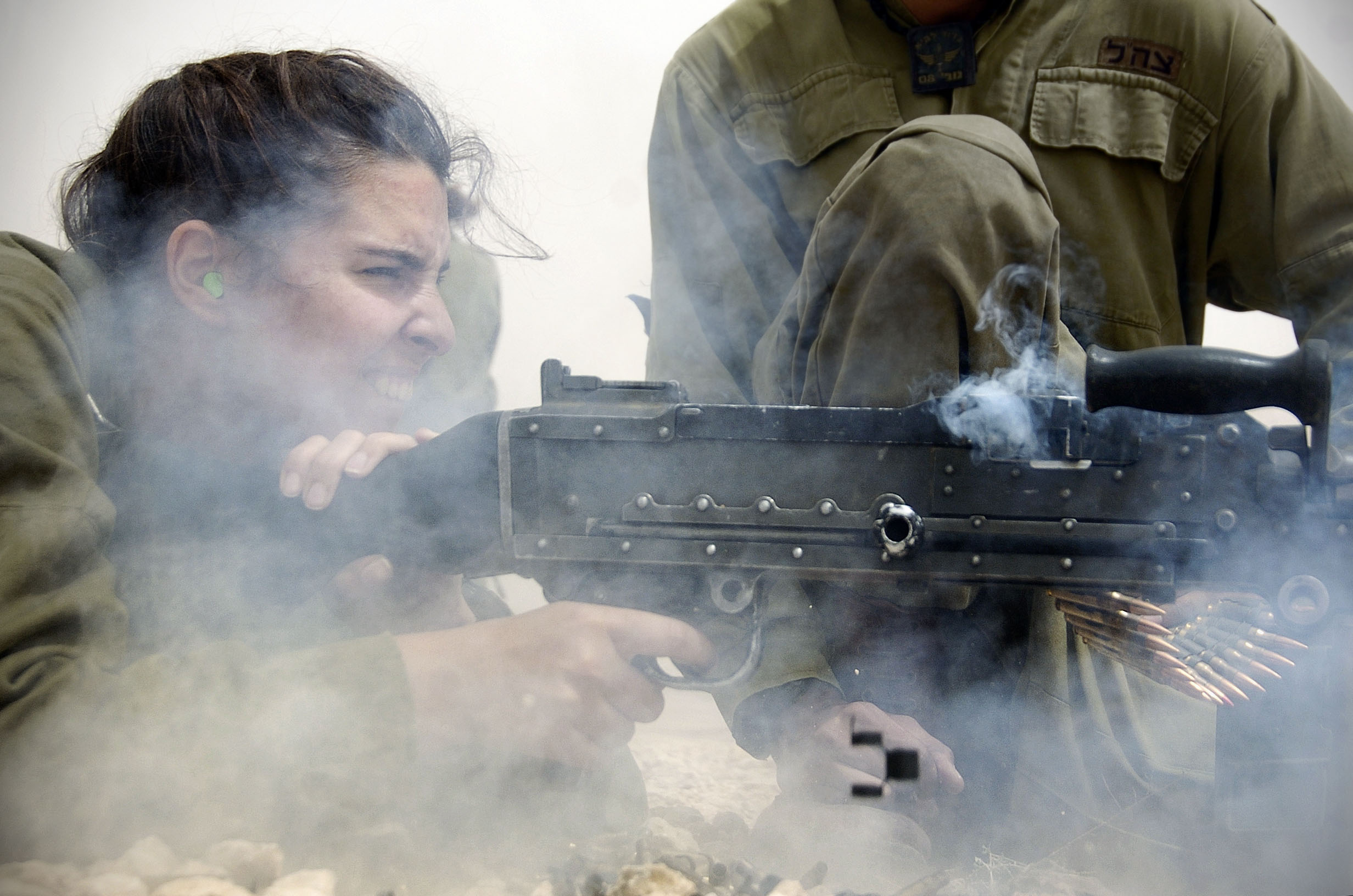
Infantry instructor of the Caracal Battalion, 2011

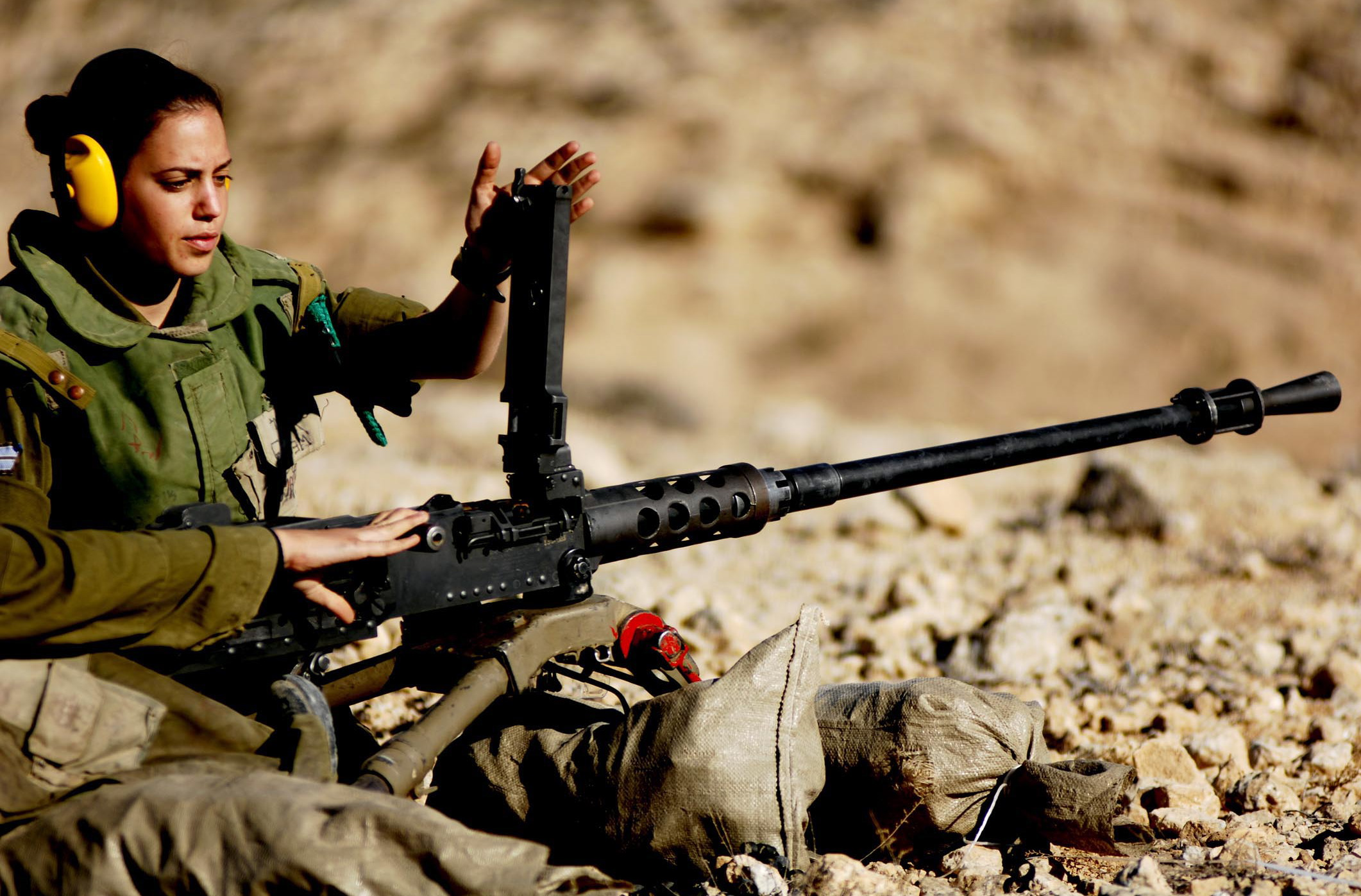
Infantry instructor during field training in southern Israel, 2006

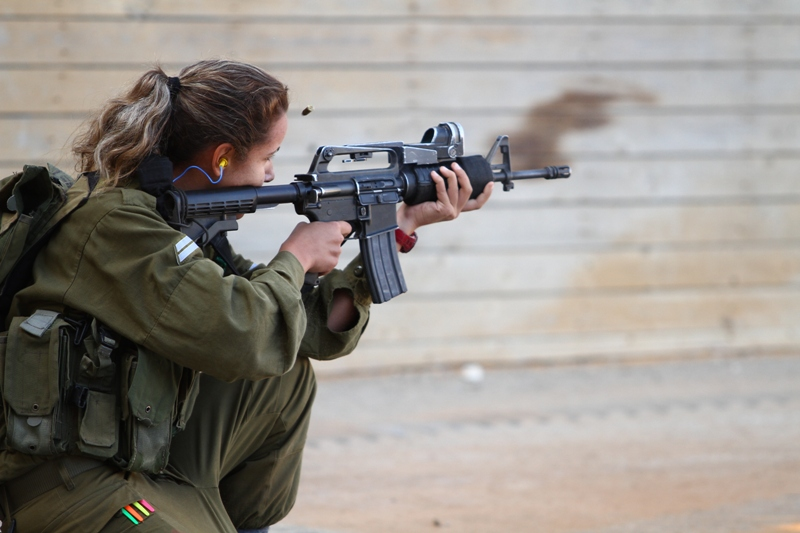
Female combat soldier during the IDF Combat Fitness Competition, 2010

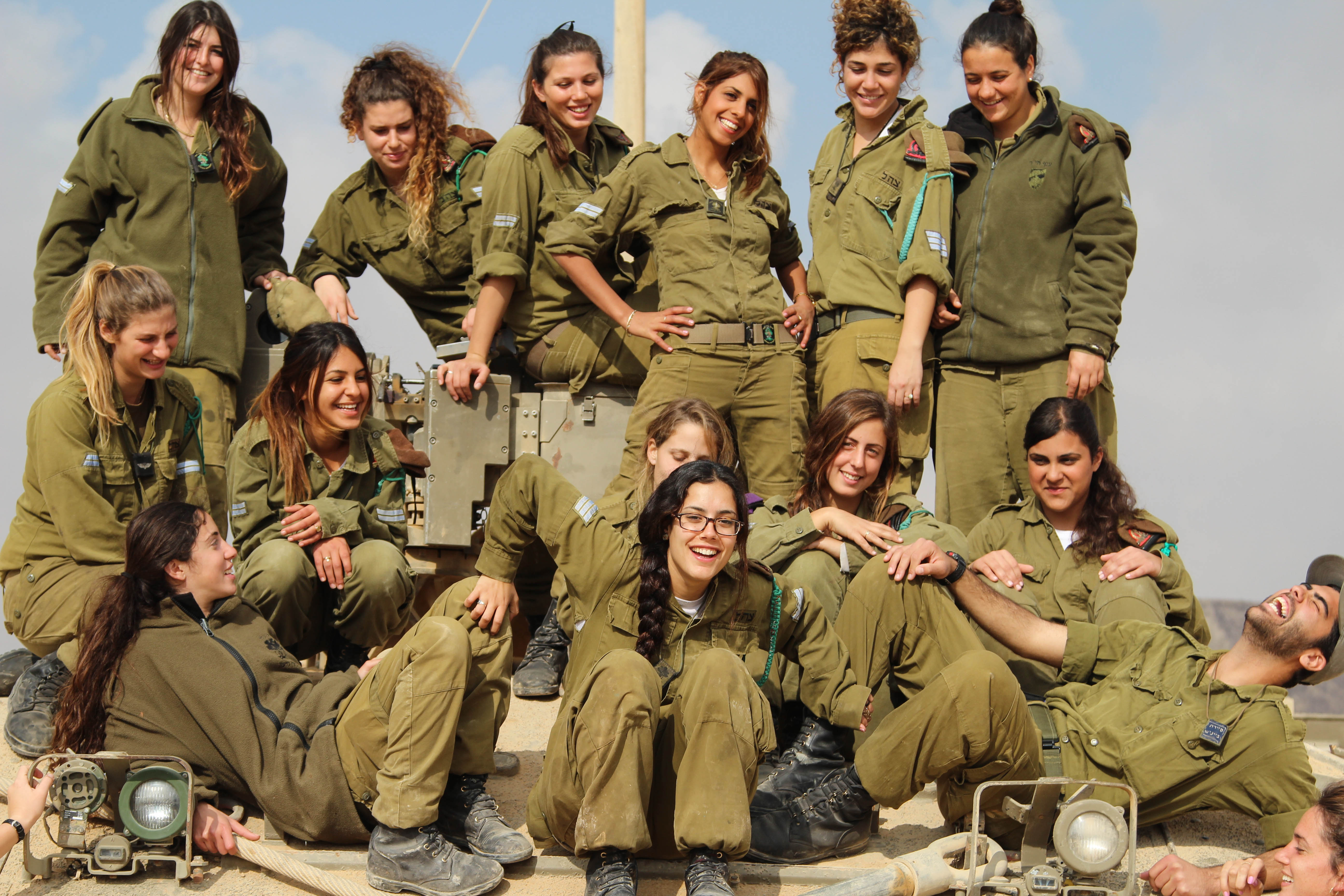
Tank combat instructors after a military drill, 2013

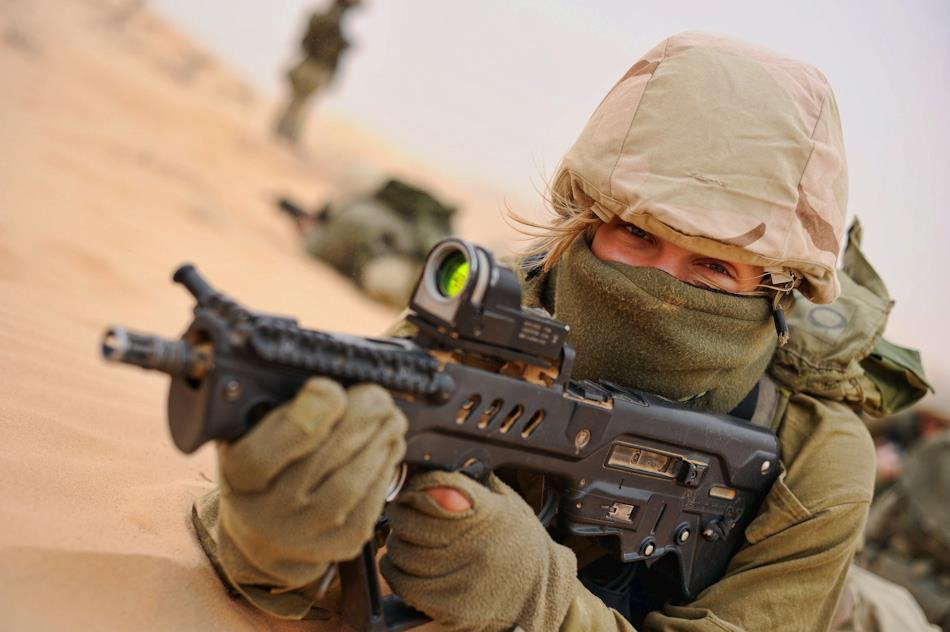
Female soldier of the Caracal Battalion during a field exercise, 2012

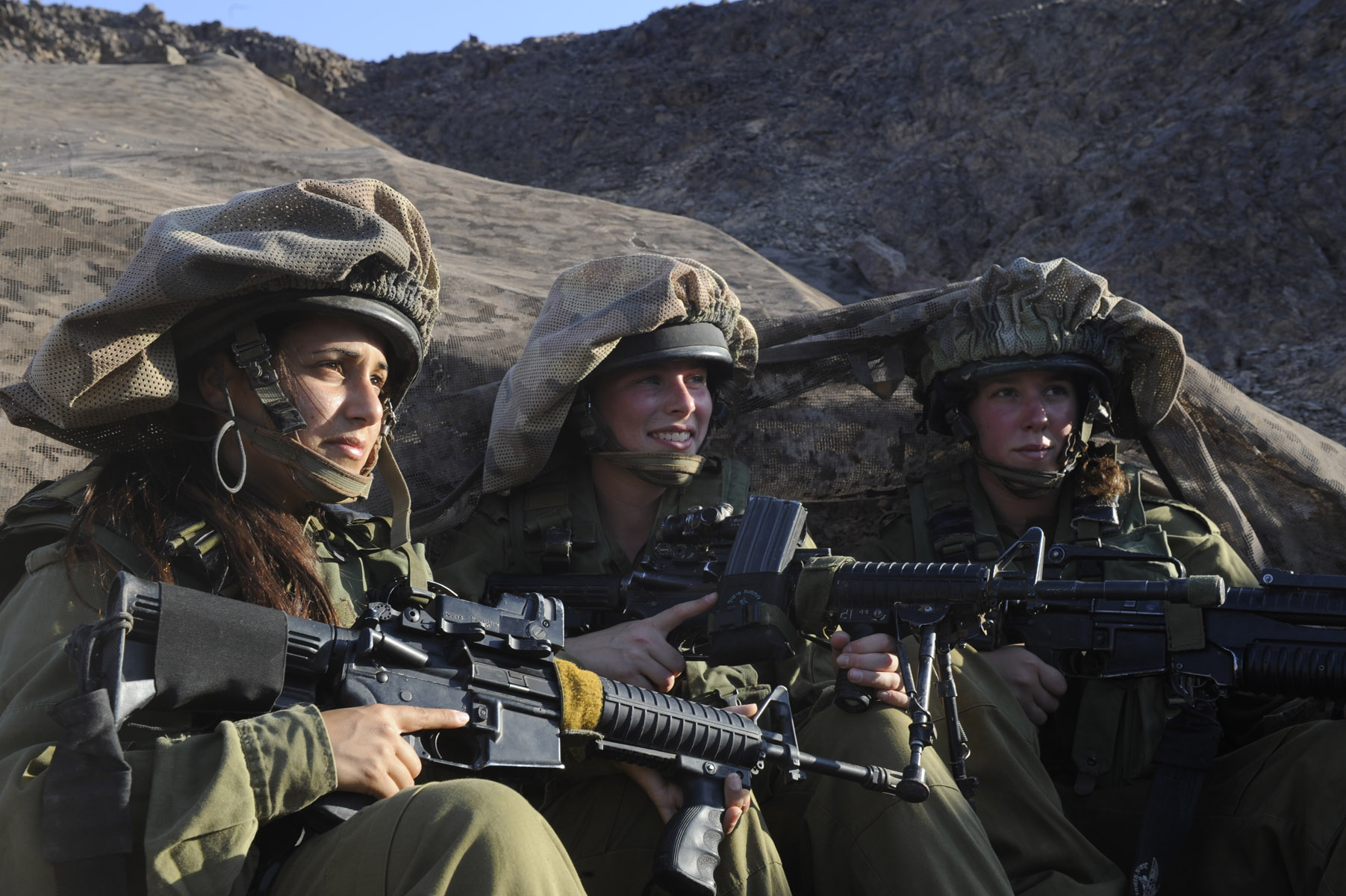
Female Israeli field intelligence combat unit, 2011

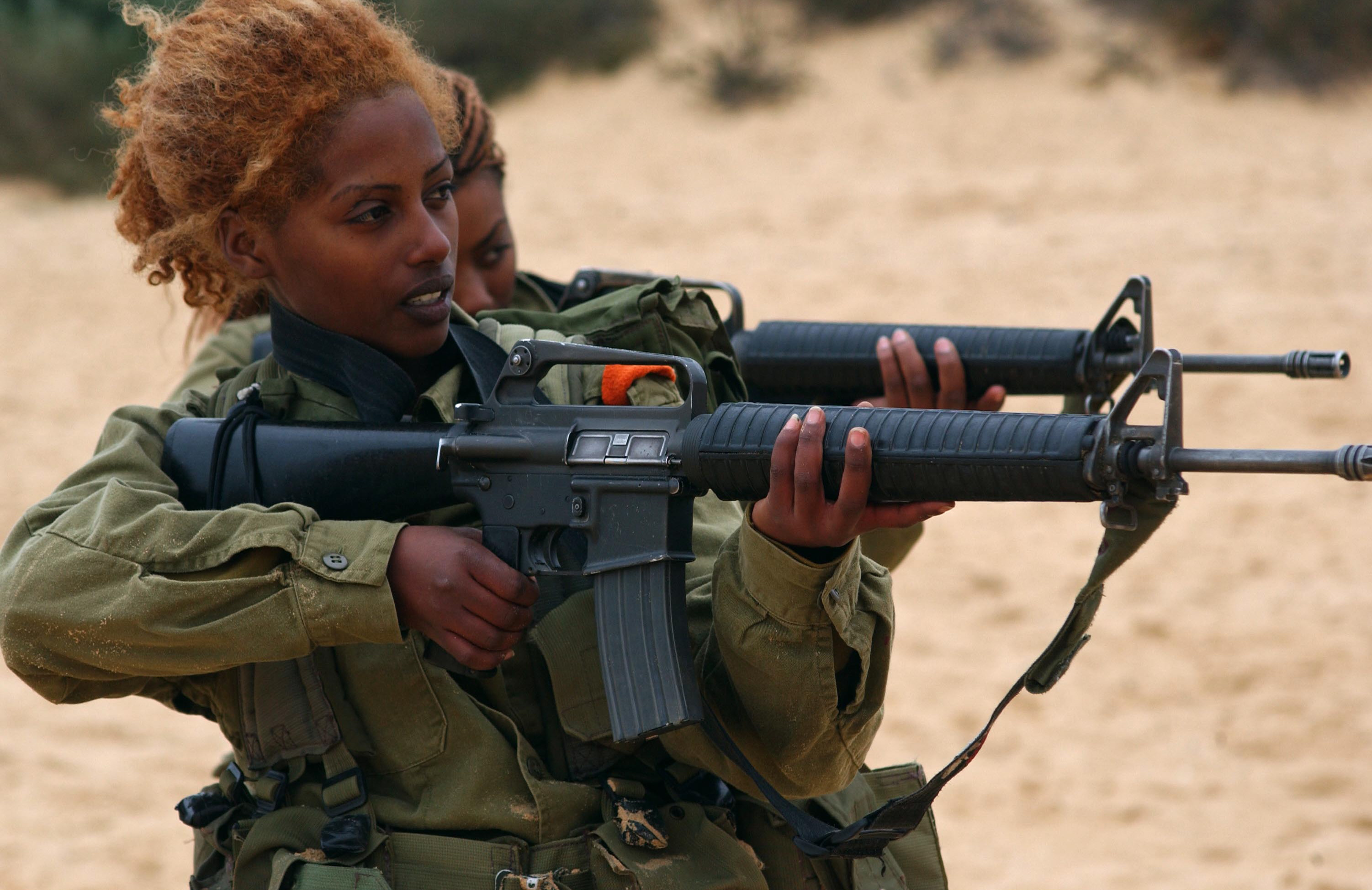
Female Israeli soldiers during basic training, 2006

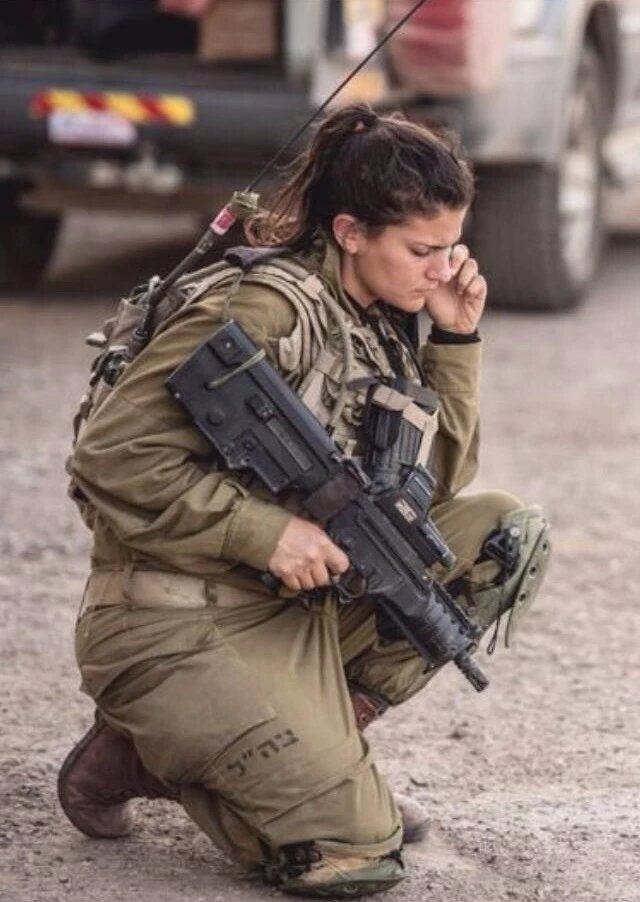
Lieutenant colonel Or Ben Yehuda, commander of Caracal Battalion, 2014

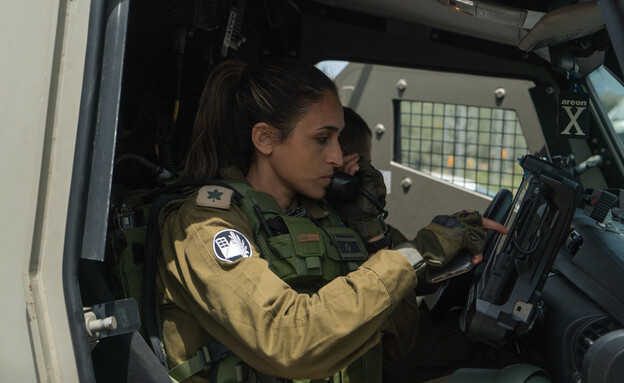
Lieutenant colonel Yarden Shukrun, commander of Shahar Battalion in the Rescue and Training Brigade of the Home Front Command, 2022

== See also ==
- Amira al-Hayb, first female Bedouin Arab soldier to serve in an Israeli military combat position
- Elinor Joseph, first female Arab Christian soldier to serve in an Israeli military combat position
- Gal Gadot, Israeli model and actress who served in the Israel Defense Forces
- Sexual orientation and gender identity in the Israeli military
- Conscription in Israel
- Women in the Gaza war
