= Mean difference =

Mean difference may refer to:

- Mean absolute difference, a measure of statistical dispersion
- Mean signed difference, a measure of central tendency

== See also ==
- Mean deviation (disambiguation)
