= Dotan =

Dotan may refer to:

== Persons ==
- Dotan (singer), full name Dotan Harpenau, a Dutch singer-songwriter born in 1986
- Amira Dotan (born 1947), Israeli military figure and a former member of Knesset for Kadima
- Aron Dotan (1928-2022), Israeli Biblical scholar
- Shimon Dotan (born 1949), film director, screenwriter and producer

== Places ==
- Mevo Dotan, a communal village and an Israeli settlement

== See also ==
- Dothan (disambiguation)
