= Edna Schechtman =

Israeli statistician

- עדנה שכטמן
- Born: July 9, 1948; Jerusalem, Israel
- Died: May 22, 2022 (aged 73)
- Known for: Development of statistical tools that utilize the Gini Mean Difference (GMD) as the measure of association
- Spouse: Gideon Schechtman
- Scientific career
- Fields: Applied statistics, mainly in biology and medicine. Theoretical statistics: calibration, measures of association, Gini coefficient for inequality, stratification of populations.
- Institutions: Ben-Gurion University of the Negev
- Doctoral advisor: Douglas Wolfe

Edna Schechtman (Hebrew: עדנה שכטמן) was an Israeli statistician, a professor emeritus of statistics at the Department of Industrial Engineering and Management, Ben-Gurion University of the Negev. She is best known for development (with Shlomo Yitzhaki) of statistical tools that utilize the Gini Mean Difference (GMD) (also known as the absolute mean difference and mean absolute difference) as the measure of association.

== Career ==
Schechtman completed her PhD in Statistics at Ohio State University in 1980, under the supervision of Douglas Wolfe, on the topic: "A Nonparametric Test for the Changepoint Problem". In 1996, she joined the Department of Industrial Engineering and Management, Ben-Gurion University of the Negev, Israel. She served as the President of the Israel Statistical Association (2009-2011) and was the Head of the Department of Industrial Engineering and Management, Ben-Gurion University of the Negev (2012-2015). She also established the Center for Statistical Consulting at Ben-Gurion University of the Negev. She was a visiting associate professor at several academic institutions, among them University of Texas, Texas A&M University, New York University and the University of California, Berkeley. She retired from Ben-Gurion University as a Professor Emeritus in 2017.

== Research ==
Schechtman's scientific work combines theoretical research in statistical methodology with applied research. In applied statistics, her research focuses mainly on biostatistics, including studies on Parkinson disease, and road safety. Schechtman's methodological work focuses on measures of association, Gini coefficient for inequality, and stratification of populations. One of her major contributions is the development of a framework which relies on the Gini Mean Difference (GMD) as the measure of variability, instead of the variance. Schechtman has conducted research projects for over 35 years and has published over 120 articles and scientific reports, including the book The Gini Methodology: A Primer on a Statistical Methodology, coauthored with Shlomo Yitzhaki, published in 2013.

== Book: The Gini Methodology: A Primer on a Statistical Methodology ==
First introduced by Corrado Gini in 1912 as an alternative measure of variability, the GMD and its variants (such as the Gini coefficient or the concentration ratio) have been in widespread use in the studies of the income distribution. In their book, Prof. Edna Schechtman and Prof. Shlomo Yitzhaki present GMD statistical tools that replace variance with the GMD and its variants. These new GMD based tools are most justified whenever the researcher cannot conveniently assume a normal distribution of variables under study and used common statistical tools as analysis of correlation, analysis of variance. This makes the GMD and the tools developed by Prof. Edna Schechtman and Prof. Shlomo Yitzhaki of critical importance in the complex research of statisticians, economists, econometricians, and policymakers.

== Highly cited articles ==
1. Schechtman, E. (2002). Odds ratio, relative risk, absolute risk reduction, and the number needed to treat—which of these should we use?. Value in health, 5(5), 431-436.
2. Davison, A., Hinkley, D. V., & Schechtman, E. (1986). Efficient bootstrap simulation. Biometrika, 73(3), 555-566.
3. Local injury to the endometrium doubles the incidence of successful pregnancies in patients undergoing in vitro fertilization
4. Paz-Elizur, T., Krupsky, M., Blumenstein, S., Elinger, D., Schechtman, E., & Livneh, Z. (2003). DNA repair activity for oxidative damage and risk of lung cancer. Journal of the National Cancer Institute, 95(17), 1312-1319.
5. Shinar, D., Schechtman, E., & Compton, R. (2001). Self-reports of safe driving behaviors in relationship to sex, age, education and income in the US adult driving population. Accident Analysis & Prevention, 33(1), 111-116.

== Personal life ==
Schechtman was born in Israel to her parents, Malka and Reuven Ziegler who immigrated from Poland to Israel in 1946 with her brother, Zvi Ziegler. The family settled in Jerusalem and then moved to Haifa in 1948. She was married to Gideon Schechtman, a Mathematician at the Weizmann Institute of Science, and was a mother to four children and a grandmother to ten.
