= Women's Equal Rights Law of Israel (1951) =

Israeli law that guarantees equal rights for men and women

The Women’s Equal Rights Law, 5711-1951 was passed by the First Knesset of the State of Israel in order to explicitly guarantee the equal status of men and women in the newly established state. The law was enacted three years after Executive Chairman of the World Zionist Organization and Head of the Jewish Agency for Palestine, David Ben-Gurion, issued Israel’s Declaration of Independence, which promised “complete equality of social and political rights to all its inhabitants, irrespective of religion, race, or sex.” Since its inception, the Women’s Equal Rights Law, 5711-1951 has been met with both praise and criticism.

== Full Text ==
English Version of Law:

1. A man and woman shall have equal status with regard to any legal proceeding; any provision of the law which discriminates, with regard to any legal proceeding, against women and women, shall be of no effect.
2. A married woman shall be fully competent to own and deal with property as if she were unmarried; her rights in property acquired to before marriage shall not be affected by her marriage.
3. (a) Both parents are the natural guardians of their children; where one parent dies, the survivor shall be the natural guardian. (b) The Provisions of subsection (a) shall not derogate from the power of a competent court or tribunal to deal with matters of guardianship over the persons or property of children with the interest of the children as the sole consideration.
4. (a) Notwithstanding anything contained in any other law, rights in an estate, being mulk land or movable property, shall be determined in accordance with the provisions of the Second Schedule or to the Succession Ordinance. (b) The provisions of subsection (a) shall apply to any estate the order for the distribution of which is made after the coming into force of this Law, even if the deceased died before such coming into force. (c) The provisions of subsection (a) do not apply to such items of an estate as are disposed of by will.
5. This Law shall not affect any legal prohibition or permission relating to marriage or divorce.
6. This Law shall not derogate from any provision of law protecting women as women.
7. All courts shall act in accordance with this Law; a tribunal competent to deal with matters of personal status shall likewise act in accordance therewith, unless all the parties are eighteen years of age or over and have consented before the tribunal, of their own free will, to have their case tried according to the laws of their community.
8. The Criminal Code Ordinance, 1936, shall be amended as follows: (a) Paragraph (c) of the proviso to section 181 is repealed; (b) the following section shall be inserted after 181: 181A. Where the husband dissolves the marriage against the will of the wife without a judgement of a competent court or tribunal ordering the wife to dissolve the marriage, the husband is guilty of a felony and shall be liable to imprisonment for a term not exceeding five years.
9. The Minister of Justice is charged with the implementation of this Law.

David Ben-Gurion, Prime Minister

Pinchas Rosen, Minister of Justice

Chaim Weizmann, President of the State

FULL TEXT

== Reception ==
=== Praise ===
Former Senior Deputy State Attorney for the Israeli Ministry of Justice Plia Albeck heralds the law for ensuring “most rights are enjoyed equally by men and women” and states “special provisions relating to women, for the most part, are regarded as benefits rather than disadvantages.” These “special provisions” grant women a “privileged status,” and include things such as women serve a shorter military service than men and mothers and pregnant women are exempt from service completely; married women are allowed to own and maintain property as if they were unmarried and their spouses have no claim to any profit from this property; and women are allowed to use contraceptives and seek a medical abortion without the consent of her husband. These examples of legal privileges for women are cited as positive outcomes of the Women’s Equal Rights Law. Albeck further explains in her 1972 article, “The Status of Women in Israel,” that the law is intended to both (1) ensure women share the same rights as men and (2) to preserve the special rights and privileges granted to women.

=== Criticism ===
While supporters of the law champion its provisions for ensuring special privileges for women, this section also garners criticism, as many aspects of “privileged status” come from religious law. Frances Raday, the currently head of the Concord Institute for the Study of the Absorption of International Law in Israel, explains “one of the main reasons for the demotion of the principle of equality in the Israeli legal system is deference to religious values.” The State of Israel identifies as a state that is both Jewish and Democratic, yet often finds its religious and political values at odds. Much of the criticism for the Women’s Equal Rights Law stems from the debate over religious versus secular democratic values. Pnina Lahav, researcher and professor of law at Boston University, criticizes the law for both the “maintenance of religious jurisdiction over matters of marriage and divorce and the legitimation of a privileged status for women.”

Criticism for the law largely stems from the notion that rather than foster true sex equality, the law’s declaration of a “privileged status” delineates women as “separate but equal.” Although people from across the religious and political spectrum applaud the law for guaranteeing a separate status for women, critics argue that this separate status undermines female equality. The term “equal” as used is not understood the same as the term “equal” would be in the American sense of the word. The Israeli use of the term equal implies, according to feminist intellectual Catharine MacKinnon, the “Aristotelian notion that equality entails the treatment of likes alike and un-likes differently in accordance with their unlikeness”. This interpretation of equality influences Israeli policy on gender equality and enabled the restrictive laws prohibiting women from entering combat positions in the Israel Defense Forces. This "separate but equal" ideology also influenced Israel to create the Women's Corps Women's Affairs advisor as a separate unit.

== Legacy ==
Israeli Law 5711-1951 has had a lasting legacy on the state of gender equality in Israel. It has been revised once in 2000 updating much of the language and giving greater legal authority to the law. Halakha law remains the most difficult of equality issues to navigate today in Israel, even with the updated law 5711-1951. There is no civic marriage in Israel it must be done through the religious courts (Halakha, and Sharia law). However, in 2006 Gay Marriages done abroad were recognized as fit to be registered with the Official Registry in Israel, making what basically constitutes a "common law" marriage.

=== Halima Brai v Qadi of the Sharia Muslim Court ===
In 1955, widowed mother of three Halima Bria, got remarried. Under Sharia Law (which governed child custody for Muslims) a woman with children who remarried was no longer seen in Israeli legal terms as the "natural guardian" of her own children. Bria's sister-in-law submitted a claim to remove Bria's children from her custody. The only way in which Israeli law can trump a ruling by the religious courts (Islamic, Jewish, or Christian) is if the religious court "intentionally" ignored Law 5711-1951. The Israeli High Court did not side with Halima Bria and her children were removed from her custody. This case set the legal standard of allowing the various religious courts to have what amounts to near full autonomy in their rulings on issues within their competence.

=== 1986 Defense Service Law ===
This law, later amended in 1999, allows all women access to any position in the Defense Forces that they qualify for. Though the law stipulates that both men and women must perform military service for their country, it is still far easier for a woman to be exempted then it is for a man. Women can still be exempted for their own religious or conscientious reasons. They are then supposed to substitute military service for "national service" for their required two years, although this seems to be rarely implemented. Men are subjected to the IDF's discretion if they are allowed to be exempted or not. The only exception being those studying to be rabbis at the country's various yeshivas. These of course are male only and yet another source for dissatisfaction among those demanding gender equality in Israel.
