= Dothan =

Dothan is a place-name from the Hebrew Bible, identified with Tel Dothan.

It may also refer to:

== Places ==
- Dothan, Alabama, a city in Dale, Henry, and Houston counties in the U.S. state of Alabama

== People ==
- Moshe Dothan (1919–999), Israeli archaeologist, research partner and husband of Trude Dothan
- Trude Dothan (1922–2016), Israeli archaeologist
- Dan "Dani" Dothan, lyricist and vocalist for the Israeli rock and new wave band HaClique, son of Trude and Moshe

== Other ==
- Dothan, a model of the Pentium M family of mobile 32-bit single-core x86 microprocessors

== See also ==
- Dotan (disambiguation)
