= Mean deviation =

Mean deviation may refer to:

== Statistics ==
- Mean signed deviation, a measure of central tendency
- Mean absolute deviation, a measure of statistical dispersion
- Mean squared deviation, another measure of statistical dispersion

== Other ==
- Mean Deviation (book), a 2010 non-fiction book by former Metal Maniacs magazine editor Jeff Wagner

== See also ==
- Deviation (statistics)
- Mean difference (disambiguation)
