= Ella Shado-Shechtman =

Israel Defense Forces officer

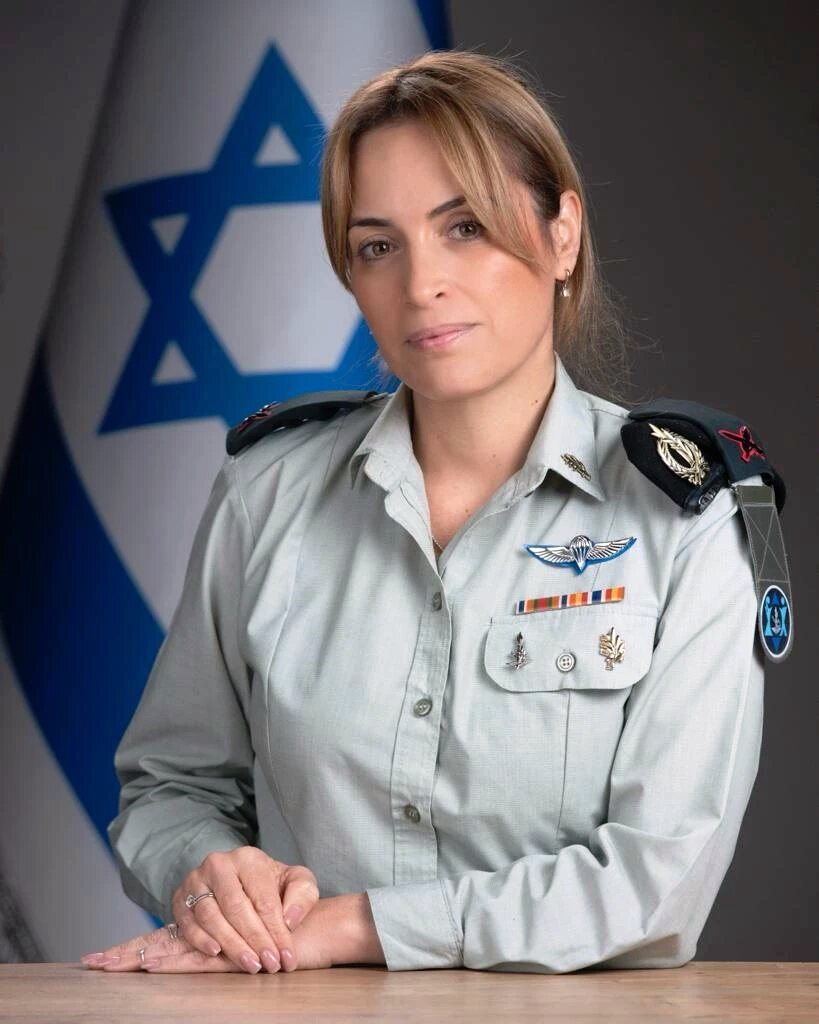
- April 2022
- Native name: אלה שדו שכטמן
- Born: Afula, Israel
- Allegiance: Israel
- Rank: Brigadier general

Brig. Gen. Ella Shado-Shechtman (Hebrew: אלה שדו שכטמן) is an Israel Defense Forces officer. She is the Gender Affairs Advisor to the Chief of Staff.

== Biography ==
Ella Shado-Shechtman was born in Afula, Israel.

Shado-Shechtman graduated from Bar-Ilan University with a master’s degree in organizational consulting.
