= Oshrat Bachar =

First female combat-battalion commander in Israel

- אושרת בכר
- Born: 1979 (age 46–47); Petah Tikva, Israel
- Spouse: Ohad Bachar
- Military career
- Allegiance: Israel
- Branch: Israel Defense Forces
- Service years: 1997–
- Rank: Lieutenant colonel
- Commands: Commander of the Field Intelligence 727 Battalion; Adviser to the office of the chief of staff of Women's Affairs

Oshrat Bachar (Hebrew: אושרת בכר; born 1979) is a Lieutenant colonel in the Israel Defense Forces and a commander of the Field Intelligence 727 Battalion "Eitam" which is part of the Southern Command and operates in the Gaza border of Jordan and in the Egyptian border. Bachar is the first female combat-battalion commander in Israel.

== History ==
Born in 1979, Bachar was born in Petah Tikva. Bachar began her military career as a lookout soldier in the Combat Intelligence Corps, later becoming a company commander in the field. She later joined the IDF's Combat Intelligence School before serving as an adviser to the office of the chief of staff of Women's Affairs. Oshrat also served in the past as the head of the field intelligence spotter training course, as well as the chief of general staff's adviser on women's issues.

On December 31, 2013 IDF Ground Forces Commander Maj. Gen. Guy Tzur appointed Bachar to the position of combat battalion commander, making her the first Israeli combat battalion commander. In early 2014, Bachar completed course on command and special staff at Glilot. After completing the course she will go on a battalion commander's course after which she will take command of the Field Intelligence Battalion 727, known as "Eitam", stationed on the Israel-Egypt border.

Bachar is married to Maj. Ohad Bachar, an officer in the Combat Engineering Corps. They have one daughter.
