= Gideon Schechtman =

Israeli mathematician

- גדעון שכטמן
- Born: February 14, 1947 (age 79); Jerusalem, Mandatory Palestine
- Education: Hebrew University of Jerusalem
- Spouse: Edna Schechtman
- Scientific career
- Workplaces: Weizmann Institute of Science
- Thesis: Complemented Subspaces of $L_p$ and Universal Spaces (1976)
- Doctoral advisor: Joram Lindenstrauss

Gideon Schechtman (Hebrew: גדעון שכטמן; born 14 February 1947) is an Israeli mathematician and professor of mathematics at the Weizmann Institute of Science.

== Academic career ==
Schechtman received his Ph.D. in mathematics from the Hebrew University of Jerusalem in 1976 and was a postdoctoral fellow at Ohio State University.

Since 1980 he has been affiliated with the Weizmann Institute, where he became emeritus professor in 2017. His research focuses predominantly on functional analysis and the geometry of Banach spaces. Schechtman is an editor of the Israel Journal of Mathematics.
