= Vadim Schechtman =

Russian mathematician (born 1954)

Vadim V. Schechtman
- Born: June 8, 1954; Russia
- Citizenship: Russian
- Education: Moscow State University
- Known for: Motivic cohomology, Hypergeometric solutions, Vertex algebras
- Honors: Invited Speaker at ICM 2002 (Beijing)
- Scientific career
- Fields: Algebraic geometry, Quantum groups, Mathematical physics
- Workplaces: Moscow State University, Stony Brook University, Paul Sabatier University (Toulouse III)
- Doctoral advisor: Evgeny Golod

Vadim V. Schechtman (Вадим Шехтман, born 8 June 1954) is a Russian mathematician who teaches in Toulouse.

Schechtman received in 1979 from Moscow State University his doctorate under the supervision of Evgeny Golod. Schechtman was an academic at Moscow State University in the 1980s and at Stony Brook University in the 1990s. He is a now a professor at Paul Sabatier University (Toulouse III).

His research deals with algebraic geometry and quantum groups as well as with mathematical physics.

He has collaborated with Alexander Varchenko and Alexander Beilinson, among others.

Schechtman was an Invited Speaker with talk Sur les algèbres vertex attachées aux variétés algébriques at the International Congress of Mathematicians in Beijing in 2002.

== Selected publications ==
- Beilinson, A.; MacPherson, R.; Schechtman, V. (1987). "Notes on Motivic Cohomology". Duke Math. J. 54 (2): 679–710. doi:10.1215/S0012-7094-87-05430-5.
- Beilinson, A. A.; Schechtman, V. V. (1988). "Determinant bundles and Virasoro algebras". Comm. Math. Phys. 118 (4): 651–701. Bibcode:1988CMaPh.118..651B. doi:10.1007/BF01221114. S2CID 119452139.
- Beilinson, A. A.; Varchenko, A. N.; Goncharov, A. B.; Schechtman, V. V. (1990). "Projective Geometry and K-theory". Algebra i Analiz. 2 (3): 78–134.
- Beilinson, A. A.; Goncharov, A. B.; Schechtman, V. V.; Varchenko, A. N. (1990). "Aomoto dilogarithms, mixed Hodge structures and motivic cohomology of pairs of triangles on the plane". Grothendieck Festschrift. Progress in Mathematics. Birkhäuser. pp. 131–172. doi:10.1007/978-0-8176-4574-8_6. ISBN 978-0-8176-4566-3.
- Schechtman, V. V.; Varchenko, A. N. (1990). "Hypergeometric solutions of Knizhnik-Zamolodchikov equations". Lett. Math. Phys. 20 (4): 279–283. Bibcode:1990LMaPh..20..279S. doi:10.1007/BF00626523. S2CID 122181810.
- Schechtman, Vadim V.; Varchenko, Alexander N. (1991). "Arrangement of hyperplanes and Lie algebra homology". Inventiones Mathematicae. 106: 139–194. Bibcode:1991InMat.106..139S. doi:10.1007/BF01243909. S2CID 121471033.
- Schechtman, Vadim V.; Varchenko, Alexander N. (1991). "Quantum groups and homology of local systems". in:, Algebraic geometry and analytic geometry (ICM 90 Satellite Conference Tokyo). Springer Verlag. pp. 182–197. doi:10.1007/978-4-431-68172-4_10. ISBN 978-4-431-70086-9.
- Feigin, Boris; Schechtman, Vadim; Varchenko, Alexander (1994). "On algebraic equations satisfied by hypergeometric correlators in WZW models, Part 1". Comm. Math. Phys. 163 (1): 173–184. Bibcode:1994CMaPh.163..173F. doi:10.1007/BF02101739. S2CID 189834500.
- Factorizable sheaves and quantum groups. Lecture Notes in Mathematics 1691. Springer Verlag. 1998. Bezrukavnikov, Roman; Finkelberg, Michael; Schechtman, Vadim (2006). pbk reprint. Springer. ISBN 9783540692317.
- Schechtman, Vadim (2011). "Pentagramma Mirificum and elliptic functions". arXiv:1106.3633 [math.AG].
