= Amira Dotan =

Israeli politician

- עמירה דותן
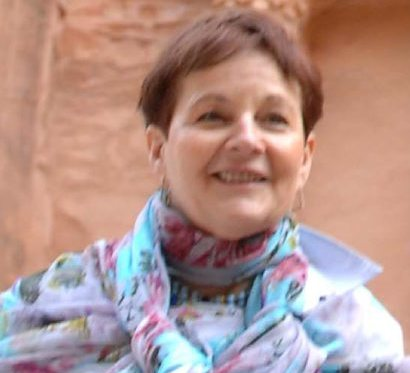

Faction represented in the Knesset
- 2006–2009: Kadima

Personal details
- Born: 28 July 1947 (age 77); Tel Aviv, Mandatory Palestine

Amira Dotan (Hebrew: עמירה דותן; born 28 July 1947) is an Israeli military figure and a former member of Knesset for Kadima.

== Biography ==
Dotan served in the Israel Defense Forces (IDF) from 1965 to 1988, ending her career as the Head of the Women's Corps, with the rank of Brigadier General. Attaining it in 1986, she became the first woman in the history of the IDF to hold this rank. She also completed a B.A. in Behavioral Science and an M.A. in Psychology from the Ben Gurion University of the Negev. Upon completing her military service, she served as Vice President of that University, as well as on the Board of Directors of Israel Military Industries and at the Jewish Agency.

For the 2006 elections in Israel, Dotan joined the Kadima party in the 28th position on their list of potential Knesset members. The list eventually gained 29 seats, ensuring Dotan's election.

Dotan was not a candidate in the 2009 elections

She is a widow and mother of three children.
