= Mean signed deviation =

In statistics, the mean signed difference (MSD), also known as mean signed deviation, mean signed error, or mean bias error is a sample statistic that summarizes how well a set of estimates $\hat{\theta}_i$ match the quantities $\theta_i$ that they are supposed to estimate. It is one of a number of statistics that can be used to assess an estimation procedure, and it would often be used in conjunction with a sample version of the mean square error.

For example, suppose a linear regression model has been estimated over a sample of data, and is then used to extrapolate predictions of the dependent variable out of sample after the out-of-sample data points have become available. Then $\theta_i$ would be the i-th out-of-sample value of the dependent variable, and $\hat{\theta}_i$ would be its predicted value. The mean signed deviation is the average value of $\hat{\theta}_i-\theta_i.$

== Definition ==
The mean signed difference is derived from a set of n pairs, $( \hat{\theta}_i,\theta_i)$, where $\hat{\theta}_i$ is an estimate of the parameter $\theta$ in a case where it is known that $\theta=\theta_i$. In many applications, all the quantities $\theta_i$ will share a common value. When applied to forecasting in a time series analysis context, a forecasting procedure might be evaluated using the mean signed difference, with $\hat{\theta}_i$ being the predicted value of a series at a given lead time and $\theta_i$ being the value of the series eventually observed for that time-point. The mean signed difference is defined to be

$$\operatorname{MSD}(\hat{\theta}) = \frac{1}{n}\sum^{n}_{i=1} \hat{\theta_{i}} - \theta_{i} .$$

== Use Cases ==
The mean signed difference is often useful when the estimations $\hat{\theta_i}$ are biased from the true values $\theta_i$ in a certain direction. If the estimator that produces the $\hat{\theta_i}$ values is unbiased, then $\operatorname{MSD}(\hat{\theta_i})=0$. However, if the estimations $\hat{\theta_i}$ are produced by a biased estimator, then the mean signed difference is a useful tool to understand the direction of the estimator's bias.

== See also ==
- Bias of an estimator
- Deviation (statistics)
- Mean absolute difference
- Mean absolute error
