= Shlomo Yitzhaki (economist) =

Israeli economist (1944–2023)

- שלמה יצחקי
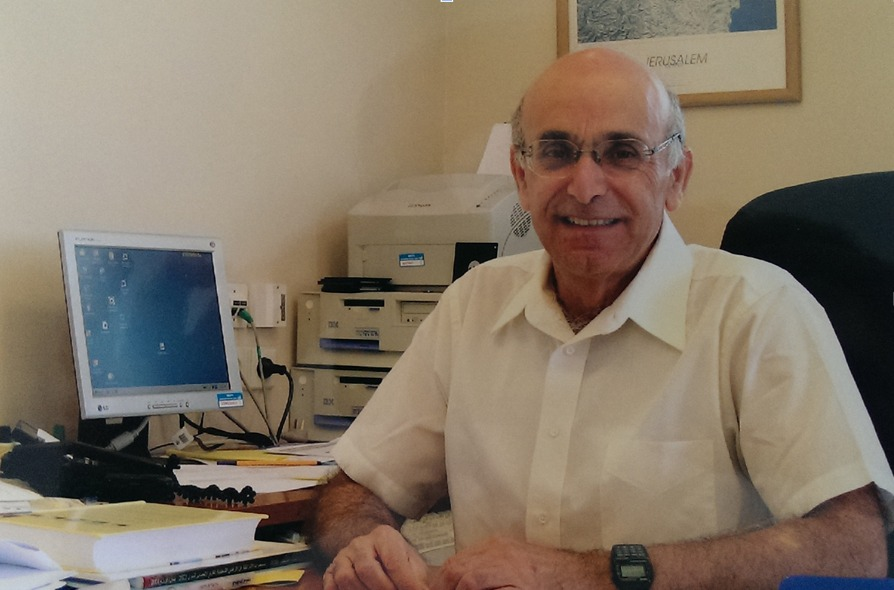
- Born: 17 January 1944; Baghdad, Iraq
- Died: 17 April 2023 (aged 79); Jerusalem, Israel
- Occupation: Economist
- Spouse: Ruhama Yitzhaki
- Children: Guy, Nili

Shlomo Yitzhaki (Hebrew: שלמה יצחקי; 17 January 1944 – 17 April 2023) was an Israeli economist and the Sam M. Cohodas professor emeritus of agricultural economics at the Hebrew University of Jerusalem. From 2002 to 2012 he served as the chief statistician and director of the Israeli Central Bureau of Statistics.

== Life and career ==
Yitzhaki was born on 17 January 1944. He earned his Ph.D. in economics from the Hebrew University in 1976. He spent a year as a visiting scholar at Harvard University, and then returned to Jerusalem as a lecturer in 1977. From 1981 to 1982 he worked as a research economist at the National Bureau of Economic Research. In 1982 he returned to academia as a senior lecturer at Hebrew University, where he remained until his death. He joined the faculty as an associate professor in 1990, and earned his tenure in 1993. In 2008 he was granted emeritus status.

Yitzhaki first consulted as an economist at the World Bank in 1986, and was appointed director of the Central Bureau of Statistics in 2002. He represented Israel at the International Statistical Institute. He also consulted with the governments of many developing nations and was considered a "world-class expert" regarding the design of tax systems. In 2008 he chaired the Yitzhaki Committee examining the rise of poverty in Israel.

Yitzhaki died on 17 April 2023, at the age of 79.

== Publications ==
The following partial list of publications is largely taken from the Hebrew University Faculty Directory.

- 2003, "Gini's Mean difference: a superior measure of variability for non-normal distributions", Metron - International Journal of Statistics
- 2002, "Decomposing World Income Distribution: Does the World Have a Middle Class?", Review of Income and Wealth
- 1998, "More than a Dozen Alternative Ways of Spelling Gini", Journal of Economic Inequality
- 1996, "Dalton improving tax reform when households are heterogeneous", Journal of Public Economics
- 1995, "Dalton improving indirect tax reform", American Economic Review
- 1995, "Equity, equality and welfare", European Economic Review
- 1995, "Changing ranks and the inequality impacts of taxes and transfers", National Tax Journal
- 1991, "Calculating jackknife variance estimators for parameters of the Gini method", Journal of Business & Economic Statistics
- 1991, "Income stratification and income inequality", Review of Income and Wealth
- 1991, "Welfare dominance: An application to commodity taxation", American Economic Review
- 1987, "On the Excess Burden of Tax Evasion", Public Finance Review
- 1985, "Income inequality effects by income source: a new approach and applications to the United States", The Review of Economics and Statistics
