= Gender Affairs Advisor to the Chief of Staff =

Female officer position in the Israeli military

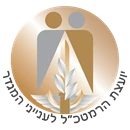
Official logo of Gender Advisor to the Chief of Defense Staff

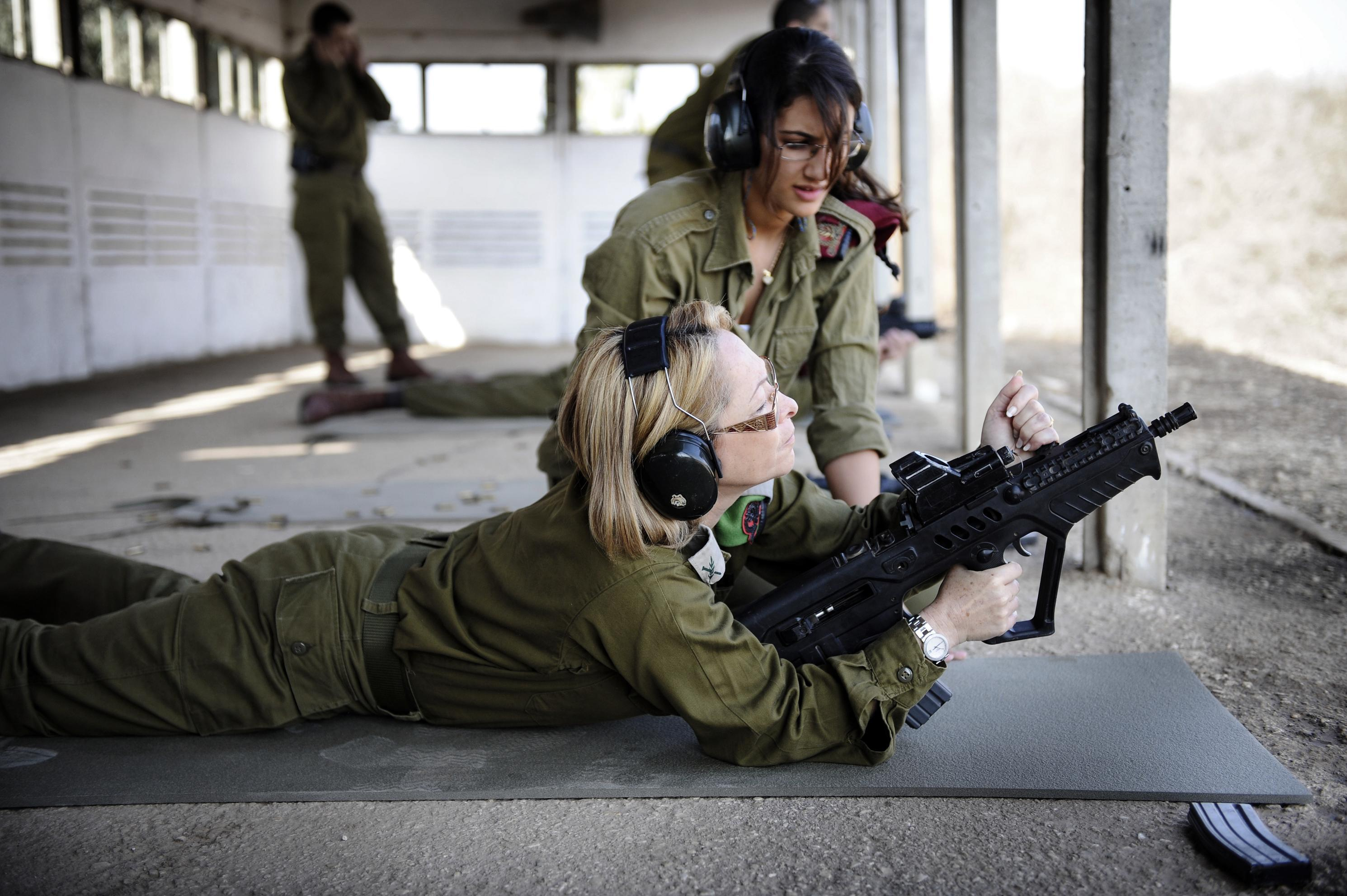
IDF Women's Affairs Advisor Brigadier General Gila Klifi-Amir practices her marksmanship skills, 2010

The Gender Advisor (GENAD) to the Chief of Defense Staff (Hebrew: יועצת הרמטכ״ל לענייני מגדר, abbreviated to יוהל״ם Yohalam) is a female officer in the Israel Defense Forces who is in charge of "promoting conditions that allow for the optimal use of the capabilities of women serving in the IDF; promoting equal opportunities for women during their military service; and assimilating women into military leadership positions" Since 2021 the position has been held by Brigadier-General Ella Shado-Shechtman.

== History ==
The Woman's Affairs advisor dates back to the Women's Corps, commonly known by its Hebrew acronym CHEN (Hebrew: ח״ן for khayil nashim), that existed from 1948 to 2001. The corps was responsible for women soldiers, including: their absorption, recruit training, and transfers to IDF units. During their service, the WC provided them with various services through WC units attached to units in other corps. It also operated a women's soldiers-teachers unit, which taught new immigrants and developing regions.

Since the 1990s, the corps' authority began to gradually transfer into the regional commands and individual commanders, while the female soldiers-teachers unit was moved to the Education and Youth Corps. In 2001, the Defense Minister, Shaul Mofaz, announced the dismantling of the corps. Its command was replaced with a new Women's Affairs advisor to the Chief of Staff position. The corps' last commander was Brigadier General Suzy Yogev.

On September 1, 2001, Suzy Yogev initiated the founding of the Women's Affairs advisor position, the dismantling of the Chief Women's Officer Command, and transferring the authority of caring for individual women soldiers' problems to respective commanders, and placing the authority for the women soldiers training base to GOC Army Headquarters.

By 2016, the title and function of the Women's Affairs advisor was altered into "Gender Affairs Advisor" (יוהל"ם: יועצת הרמטכ"ל לענייני מגדר). This shift, and the subsequent policy changes it brought about, created a strong dispute in Israel during 2016–2018.
